= List of prime ministers of Iraq =

This is a list of prime ministers of Iraq since 1920.

== List of officeholders ==
Portrait	Name (Birth–Death)	Election	Term of office			Political party	Head of State (Reign / Term)
Portrait	Name (Birth–Death)	Election	Took office	Left office	Time in office	Political party	Head of State (Reign / Term)
• Kingdom of Iraq (under the British Mandate) (1920–1932) •
	Abd Al-Rahman Al-Gillani عبد الرحمن الكيلاني (1841–1927)	—	11 November 1920	20 November 1922	2 years, 9 days	Independent	Faisal I (1921–1933)
	Abdul Muhsin al-Sa'dun عبد المحسن السعدون (1879–1929) (1st time)	—	20 November 1922	22 November 1923	1 year, 2 days	Independent	Faisal I (1921–1933)
	Ja'far al-Askari جعفر العسكري (1885–1936) (1st time)	—	22 November 1923	2 August 1924	254 days	Independent	Faisal I (1921–1933)
	Yasin al-Hashimi ياسين الهاشمي (1882–1937) (1st time)	—	2 August 1924	26 June 1925	328 days	Independent	Faisal I (1921–1933)
	Abdul Muhsin al-Sa'dun عبد المحسن السعدون (1879–1929) (2nd time)	1925	26 June 1925	21 November 1926	1 year, 148 days	Progressive Party (Note: This party existed only for the duration of al-Sa‘doun's second term as prime minister.)	Faisal I (1921–1933)
	Ja'far al-Askari جعفر العسكري (1885–1936) (2nd time)	—	21 November 1926	11 January 1928	1 year, 51 days	Independent	Faisal I (1921–1933)
	Abdul Muhsin al-Sa'dun عبد المحسن السعدون (1879–1929) (3rd time)	1928	11 January 1928	28 April 1929	1 year, 107 days	Independent	Faisal I (1921–1933)
	Tawfiq al-Suwaidi توفيق السويدي (1892–1968) (1st time)	—	28 April 1929	19 September 1929	144 days	Independent	Faisal I (1921–1933)
	Abdul Muhsin al-Sa'dun عبد المحسن السعدون (1879–1929) (4th time)	—	19 September 1929	13 November 1929 (died in office)	55 days	Independent	Faisal I (1921–1933)
	Naji Al-Suwaidi ناجي السويدي (1882–1942)	—	18 November 1929	23 March 1930	125 days	Independent	Faisal I (1921–1933)
	Nuri al-Said نوري السعيد (1888–1958) (1st time)	1930	23 March 1930	3 November 1932	2 years, 225 days	Party of the Covenant (Note: Abbreviated as the Covenant Party, this party existed only for the duration of al-Said's first term as prime minister.)	Faisal I (1921–1933)
• Kingdom of Iraq (1932–1958) •
	Naji Shawkat ناجي شوكت (1893–1980)	—	3 November 1932	20 March 1933	137 days	Independent (Note: While not affiliated with an official political party, Shawkat was supported by a parliamentary group known as the Parliamentary Bloc which only existed for the duration of his administration.)	Faisal I (1921–1933)
	Rashid Ali al-Gaylani رشيد عالي الكيلاني (1892–1965) (1st time)	1933	20 March 1933	9 November 1933	234 days	Party of National Brotherhood	Faisal I (1921–1933)
	Rashid Ali al-Gaylani رشيد عالي الكيلاني (1892–1965) (1st time)	1933	20 March 1933	9 November 1933	234 days	Party of National Brotherhood	Ghazi I (1933–1939)
	Jamil Al Midfai جميل المدفعي (1890–1958) (1st time)	—	9 November 1933	27 August 1934	291 days	Independent	Ghazi I (1933–1939)
	Ali Jawdat Al-Ayyubi علي جودت الأيوبي (1886–1969) (1st time)	1934	27 August 1934	4 March 1935	189 days	Independent	Ghazi I (1933–1939)
	Jamil Al Midfai جميل المدفعي (1890–1958) (2nd time)	—	4 March 1935	17 March 1935	13 days	Independent	Ghazi I (1933–1939)
	Yasin al-Hashimi ياسين الهاشمي (1882–1937) (2nd time)	1935	17 March 1935	30 October 1936 (deposed)	1 year, 227 days	Party of National Brotherhood	Ghazi I (1933–1939)
	Hikmat Sulayman حكمت سليمان (1889–1964)	1936–37	30 October 1936	17 August 1937	291 days	Party of National Brotherhood	Ghazi I (1933–1939)
	Jamil Al Midfai جميل المدفعي (1890–1958) (3rd time)	Dec 1937	17 August 1937	25 December 1938 (deposed) (Note: Midfai was forced to resign under military pressure.)	1 year, 130 days	Independent	Ghazi I (1933–1939)
	Nuri al-Said نوري السعيد (1888–1958) (2nd time)	1939	25 December 1938	31 March 1940 (deposed) (Note: al-Said resigned in large part due to the pressure from the Golden Square, although on the condition that he be the foreign minister in al-Gaylani's cabinet.)	1 year, 97 days	Military / Independent	Ghazi I (1933–1939)
	Nuri al-Said نوري السعيد (1888–1958) (2nd time)	1939	25 December 1938	31 March 1940 (deposed)	1 year, 97 days	Military / Independent	Faisal II (1939–1958)
	Rashid Ali al-Gaylani رشيد عالي الكيلاني (1892–1965) (2nd time)	—	31 March 1940	3 February 1941	309 days	Party of National Brotherhood	Faisal II (1939–1958)
	Taha al-Hashimi طه الهاشمي (1888–1961)	—	3 February 1941	13 April 1941 (deposed) (Note: Initially approved by the Golden Square, al-Hashimi was deposed after refusing concessions to them.)	69 days	Military	Faisal II (1939–1958)
	Rashid Ali al-Gaylani رشيد عالي الكيلاني (1892–1965) (3rd time)	—	13 April 1941	30 May 1941 (deposed)	47 days	Party of National Brotherhood	Faisal II (1939–1958)
	Jamil Al Midfai جميل المدفعي (1890–1958) (4th time)	—	4 June 1941	10 October 1941	128 days	Independent	Faisal II (1939–1958)
	Nuri al-Said نوري السعيد (1888–1958) (3rd time)	1943	10 October 1941	4 June 1944	2 years, 238 days	Military / Independent	Faisal II (1939–1958)
	Hamdi al-Pachachi حمدي الباجه جي (1886–1948)	—	4 June 1944	23 February 1946	1 year, 264 days	Independent	Faisal II (1939–1958)
	Tawfiq al-Suwaidi توفيق السويدي (1892–1968) (2nd time)	—	23 February 1946	1 June 1946	98 days	Liberal Party	Faisal II (1939–1958)
	Arshad al-Umari أرشد العمري (1888–1978) (1st time)	—	1 June 1946	21 November 1946	173 days	Independent	Faisal II (1939–1958)
	Nuri al-Said نوري السعيد (1888–1958) (4th time)	—	21 November 1946	29 March 1947	128 days	Military / Independent	Faisal II (1939–1958)
	Salih Jabr سيد صالح جبر (1896–1957)	1946–47	29 March 1947	29 January 1948	306 days	Socialist Nation Party	Faisal II (1939–1958)
	Mohammad al-Sadr سيد محمد الصدر (1882–1956)	—	29 January 1948	26 June 1948	149 days	Independent	Faisal II (1939–1958)
	Muzahim al-Pachachi مزاحم الباجه جي (1891–1982)	1948	26 June 1948	6 January 1949	194 days	Independent	Faisal II (1939–1958)
	Nuri al-Said نوري السعيد (1888–1958) (5th time)	—	6 January 1949	10 December 1949	338 days	Military / Constitutional Union Party	Faisal II (1939–1958)
	Ali Jawdat Al-Ayyubi علي جودت الأيوبي (1886–1969) (2nd time)	—	10 December 1949	5 February 1950	57 days	Independent	Faisal II (1939–1958)
	Tawfiq al-Suwaidi توفيق السويدي (1892–1968) (3rd time)	—	5 February 1950	15 September 1950	222 days	Independent	Faisal II (1939–1958)
	Nuri al-Said نوري السعيد (1888–1958) (6th time)	—	15 September 1950	12 July 1952	1 year, 301 days	Military / Constitutional Union Party	Faisal II (1939–1958)
	Mustafa Mahmud al-Umari مصطفى محمود العمري (1894–1962)	—	12 July 1952	23 November 1952	134 days	Independent	Faisal II (1939–1958)
	Nureddin Mahmud نور الدين محمود (1899–1981)	—	23 November 1952	29 January 1953	67 days	Military	Faisal II (1939–1958)
	Jamil Al Midfai جميل المدفعي (1890–1958) (5th time)	1953	29 January 1953	17 September 1953	231 days	Independent	Faisal II (1939–1958)
	Muhammad Fadhel al-Jamali محمد فاضل الجمالي (1903–1997)	—	17 September 1953	29 April 1954	224 days	Independent	Faisal II (1939–1958)
	Arshad al-Umari أرشد العمري (1888–1978) (2nd time)	Jun 1954	29 April 1954	4 August 1954	97 days	Independent	Faisal II (1939–1958)
	Nuri al-Said نوري السعيد (1888–1958) (7th time)	Sep 1954	4 August 1954	20 June 1957	2 years, 320 days	Military / Constitutional Union Party	Faisal II (1939–1958)
	Ali Jawdat Al-Ayyubi علي جودت الأيوبي (1886–1969) (3rd time)	—	20 June 1957	15 December 1957	178 days	United National Front	Faisal II (1939–1958)
	Abdul-Wahab Mirjan عبد الوهاب مرجان (1909–1964)	—	15 December 1957	3 March 1958	78 days	Independent	Faisal II (1939–1958)
	Nuri al-Said نوري السعيد (1888–1958) (8th time)	—	3 March 1958	18 May 1958	76 days	Military / Constitutional Union Party	Faisal II (1939–1958)
	Ahmad Mukhtar Baban أحمد مختار بابان (1900–1976)	1958	18 May 1958	14 July 1958 (deposed)	57 days	Independent	Faisal II (1939–1958)
→ • First Republic of Iraq (1958–1968) • →
	Abdul-Karim Qasim عبد الكريم قاسم (1914–1963)	—	14 July 1958	8 February 1963 (deposed)	4 years, 209 days	Military	Muhammad Najib ar-Ruba'i (1958–1963)
	Ahmed Hassan al-Bakr أحمد حسن البكر (1914–1982) (1st time)	—	8 February 1963	18 November 1963 (deposed)	283 days	Military / Ba'ath Party (Iraq Region)	Abdul Salam Arif (1963–1966)
	Tahir Yahya طاهر يحيى (1915–1986) (1st time)	—	20 November 1963	6 September 1965	1 year, 290 days	Military / Arab Socialist Union	Abdul Salam Arif (1963–1966)
	Arif Abdul Razzaq عارف عبد الرزاق (1921–2007)	—	6 September 1965	21 September 1965	15 days	Military / Arab Socialist Union	Abdul Salam Arif (1963–1966)
	Abdul-Rahman al-Bazzaz عبد الرحمن البزاز (1913–1973)	—	21 September 1965	9 August 1966	322 days	Arab Socialist Union	Abdul Salam Arif (1963–1966)
	Naji Talib ناجي طالب (1917–2012)	—	9 August 1966	10 May 1967	274 days	Military	Abdul Rahman Arif (1966–1968)
	Abdul Rahman Arif عبد الرحمن عارف (1916–2007)	—	10 May 1967	10 July 1967	61 days	Military / Arab Socialist Union	Abdul Rahman Arif (1966–1968)
	Tahir Yahya طاهر يحيى (1915–1986) (2nd time)	—	10 July 1967	17 July 1968 (deposed)	1 year, 7 days	Military / Arab Socialist Union	Abdul Rahman Arif (1966–1968)
→ • Ba'athist Iraq (1968–2003) • →
	Abdul Razzaq an-Naif عبد الرزاق النايف (1933–1978)	—	17 July 1968	30 July 1968	13 days	Military	Ahmed Hassan al-Bakr (1968–1979)
	Ahmed Hassan al-Bakr أحمد حسن البكر (1914–1982) (2nd time)	—	31 July 1968	16 July 1979 (resigned)	10 years, 350 days	Military / Iraqi Ba'ath Party (Iraq Region)	Ahmed Hassan al-Bakr (1968–1979)
	Saddam Hussein صدام حسين (1937–2006) (1st time)	1980; 1984; 1989	16 July 1979	23 March 1991	11 years, 250 days	Iraqi Ba'ath Party (Iraq Region)	Saddam Hussein (1979–2003)
	Sa'dun Hammadi سعدون حمادي (1930–2007)	—	23 March 1991	13 September 1991	174 days	Iraqi Ba'ath Party (Iraq Region)	Saddam Hussein (1979–2003)
	Mohammed Hamza Zubeidi محمد حمزة الزبيدي (1938–2005)	—	16 September 1991	5 September 1993	1 year, 354 days	Iraqi Ba'ath Party (Iraq Region)	Saddam Hussein (1979–2003)
	Ahmad Husayn; Khudayir as-Samarrai أحمد حسين خضير السامرائي (born 1941)	—	5 September 1993	29 May 1994	266 days	Iraqi Ba'ath Party (Iraq Region)	Saddam Hussein (1979–2003)
	Saddam Hussein صدام حسين (1937–2006) (2nd time)	1996; 2000	29 May 1994	9 April 2003 (deposed)	8 years, 315 days	Iraqi Ba'ath Party (Iraq Region)	Saddam Hussein (1979–2003)
• Republic of Iraq (2003–2004) • Coalition Provisional Authority (Iraqi Governing Council)
	Mohammad Bahr al-Uloom محمد بحر العلوم (1927–2015); Acting Prime Minister (1st time)	—	13 July 2003	31 July 2003	18 days	Independent	Coalition Provisional Authority (2003–2004)
	Ibrahim al-Jaafari إبراهيم الجعفري (born 1947) (1st time)	—	1 August 2003	31 August 2003	30 days	Islamic Dawa Party	Coalition Provisional Authority (2003–2004)
	Ahmed al-Chalabi أحمد جلبي (1944–2015)	—	1 September 2003	30 September 2003	29 days	Iraqi National Congress	Coalition Provisional Authority (2003–2004)
	Ayad Allawi إياد علاوي (born 1944) (1st time)	—	1 October 2003	31 October 2003	30 days	Iraqi National Accord	Coalition Provisional Authority (2003–2004)
	Jalal Talabani جلال طلباني (1933–2017)	—	1 November 2003	30 November 2003	29 days	Patriotic Union of Kurdistan	Coalition Provisional Authority (2003–2004)
	Abdul Aziz al-Hakim عبد العزيز الحكيم (1952–2009)	—	1 December 2003	31 December 2003	30 days	Islamic Supreme Council of Iraq	Coalition Provisional Authority (2003–2004)
	Adnan al-Pachachi عدنان بجاجي (1923–2019)	—	1 January 2004	31 January 2004	30 days	Assembly of Independent Democrats	Coalition Provisional Authority (2003–2004)
	Mohsen Abdel Hamid محسن عبد الحميد (born 1937)	—	1 February 2004	29 February 2004	28 days	Iraqi Islamic Party	Coalition Provisional Authority (2003–2004)
	Mohammad Bahr al-Uloom محمد بحر العلوم (1927–2015) (2nd time)	—	1 March 2004	31 March 2004	30 days	Independent	Coalition Provisional Authority (2003–2004)
	Masoud Barzani مسعود برزاني (born 1946)	—	1 April 2004	30 April 2004	29 days	Kurdistan Democratic Party	Coalition Provisional Authority (2003–2004)
	Ezzedine Salim عز الدين سليم (1943–2004)	—	1 May 2004	17 May 2004 (died in office)	16 days	Islamic Dawa Party	Coalition Provisional Authority (2003–2004)
	Ghazi Mashal Ajil al-Yawer غازي مشعل عجيل الياور (born 1958)	—	17 May 2004	1 June 2004	15 days	Independent	Coalition Provisional Authority (2003–2004)
→ • Republic of Iraq (2004–present) • →
	Ayad Allawi إياد علاوي (born 1944) (2nd time)	—	1 June 2004	3 May 2005	336 days	Iraqi National Accord	Ghazi Mashal Ajil al-Yawer (2004–2005)
	Ibrahim al-Jaafari إبراهيم الجعفري (born 1947) (2nd time)	Jan 2005	3 May 2005	20 May 2006	1 year, 17 days	Islamic Dawa Party	Jalal Talabani (2005–2014)
	Nouri al-Maliki نوري المالكي (born 1950)	Dec 2005; 2010	20 May 2006	8 September 2014	8 years, 111 days	Islamic Dawa Party	Jalal Talabani (2005–2014)
	Nouri al-Maliki نوري المالكي (born 1950)	Dec 2005; 2010	20 May 2006	8 September 2014	8 years, 111 days	Islamic Dawa Party	Fuad Masum (2014–2018)
	Haider al-Abadi حيدر العبادي (born 1952)	2014	8 September 2014	25 October 2018	4 years, 47 days	Victory Alliance	Fuad Masum (2014–2018)
	Haider al-Abadi حيدر العبادي (born 1952)	2014	8 September 2014	25 October 2018	4 years, 47 days	Victory Alliance	Barham Salih (2018–2022)
	Adil Abdul-Mahdi عادل عبد المهدي (born 1942)	2018	25 October 2018	7 May 2020	1 year, 194 days	Independent	Barham Salih (2018–2022)
	Mustafa Al-Kadhimi مصطفي الکاظمي (born 1967)	—	7 May 2020	27 October 2022	2 years, 174 days	Independent	Barham Salih (2018–2022)
	Mohammed Shia' al-Sudani محمد شياع السوداني (born 1970)	2021	27 October 2022	14 May 2026	3 years, 199 days	Furatayn Movement (Coordination Framework)	Abdul Latif Rashid (2022–2026)
	Mohammed Shia' al-Sudani محمد شياع السوداني (born 1970)	2021	27 October 2022	14 May 2026	3 years, 199 days	Furatayn Movement (Coordination Framework)	Nizar Amidi (2026–present)
	Ali al-Zaidi علي الزيدي (born 1985)	2025	14 May 2026	Incumbent	158 days	Independent (Coordination Framework)	Nizar Amidi (2026–present)

== See also ==
- List of kings of Iraq
- President of Iraq
  - List of presidents of Iraq
- Vice President of Iraq
