= 1946–47 Iraqi parliamentary election =

Parliamentary elections were held in Iraq between 21 November 1946 and 10 March 1947 to elect members of the Chamber of Deputies.

== Background ==
During the al-Suwaidi government (February–June 1946), the electoral law of 1924 was revised. The number of seats in the Chamber of Deputies was increased to 138 and provinces were divided into smaller electoral districts. The elections were held under the al-Said government (1946–47).

Five parties – the Liberals, National Union, National Liberation, Iraqi Communist, and People's Party – boycotted the elections, accusing the government of interfering in the electoral process.

== Results ==
Pro-government parties won the elections. Two opposition parties, the Iraqi Independence Party and the National Democratic Party, each won five seats.

== Aftermath ==
The new Parliament convened on 17 March 1947 and elected Abdul Aziz al-Qassab as speaker. Salih Jabr was tasked with forming a new government, which was officially formed on 29 March 1947.

After the 1948 uprising against the renewal of the 1930 Anglo-Iraqi Treaty and the Portsmouth Agreement, Salih Jabr resigned on 29 January 1948.

Muhammad as-Sadr subsequently formed a new government. These events strengthened the opposition parties. Parliament was dissolved on 20 February 1948 to allow for greater political participation in the upcoming elections.
