= 1958 Iraqi parliamentary election =

- 5 May 1958

All 145 seats in the Chamber of Deputies 73 seats needed for a majority
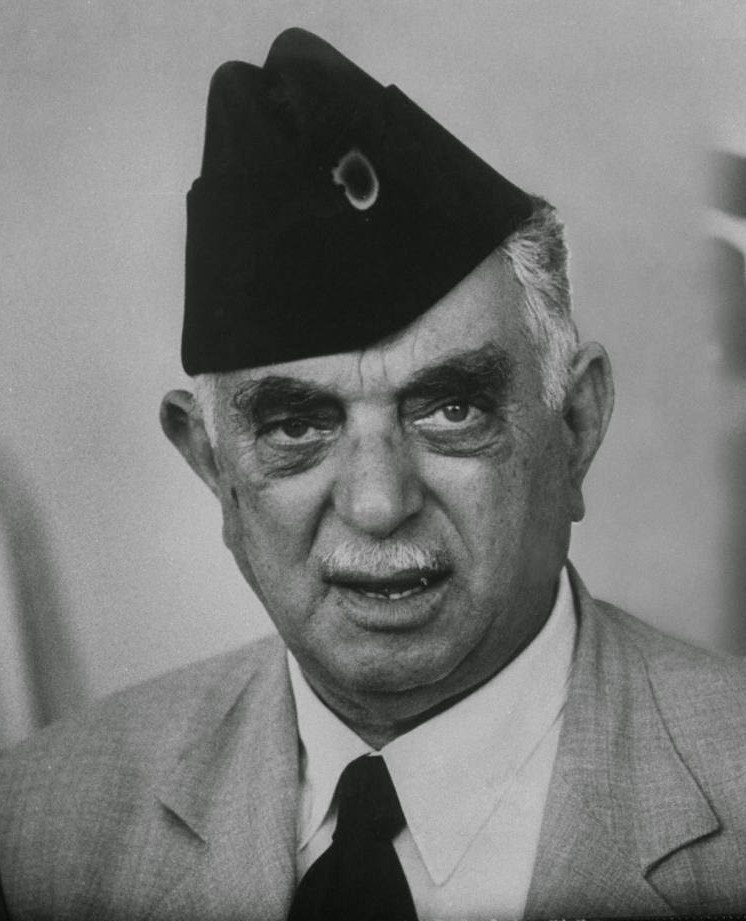
	First party
Leader	Nuri as-Said
Party	Pro-government
Last election	94
Seats won	140
Seat change	▲46
Prime Minister before election
Nuri al-Said
Elected Prime Minister
Ahmad Mukhtar Baban

Parliamentary elections were held in Iraq on 5 May 1958 to elect the members of the Chamber of Deputies. It was the last election in monarchical Iraq. Most political parties had been dissolved in 1954. The main opposition coalition, the National Union Front, decided to boycott the elections. Candidates supportive of the government won 140 of the 145 seats, whilst independent candidates won the remaining five. The new parliament lasted two months only. On 14 July the monarchical government was overthrown in a military coup, and another election the same year would institute Abd al-Karim Qasim as prime minister of the new Iraqi Republic.
