= Khattab al-Khedhairi =

Khattab al-Khedhairi (Arabic: خطاب الخضيري) was an Iraqi politician. He was elected to the Chamber of Deputies from Kut Liwa in the January 17, 1953 election (first direct general election in Iraq). He was re-elected in June 1954 election, the sole United Popular Front candidate. By the time of the September 1954 election, the United Popular Front had become largely defunct but al-Khedhairi was re-elected unopposed from Kut.

Al-Khedhairi died in March 1957.
