= Jamil Abdul Wahab =

Iraqi lawyer, judge, and politician (1913-1973)

- جميل عبد الوهاب

Minister of Justice
- Monarch: Faisal II
- Prime Minister: Ahmad Mukhtar Baban
- Preceded by: Abdul Rasul al-Khalisi
- Succeeded by: Mustafa Ali

Personal details
- Born: Jamil Abdul Wahab Abdul Razzaq; 1913 Baghdad, Ottoman Iraq
- Died: 1973 (aged 59–60)

Jamil Abdul Wahab Abdul Razzaq (Note: Arabic: جميل عبد الوهاب عبد الرزاق, romanized: Jamīl ʻAbd al-Wahhāb ʻAbd al-Razzāq) (1913 – 1973) was an Iraqi lawyer, judge and politician. He held various ministerial positions during the monarchy in Iraq, where he held the posts of Minister of Education, Minister of Social Affairs and Minister of Justice.

== Education and career ==
He completed his primary and secondary studies in Baghdad, entered the law school and graduated in 1931. He practiced the judiciary in 1933, but he left the judiciary to practice law and politics. He was elected as a deputy for the Diyala Brigade in 1940 and 1943, and he was elected as a barrister for lawyers twice in 1943 and then in 1944. He held the position of Captain of Lawyers in 1946 succeeding Najib al-Rawi, but Najib al-Rawi was back to the position of Captain before the end of the year when Jamil Abdel-Wahab held the position of Minister in the ninth ministry of Nuri Al-Said.

He was also appointed ambassador to Iraq in Beirut in 1955, and was the last minister of justice in the royal era.

He disappeared from view after the 1958 Iraqi Military Coup until he fled to Lebanon, and he died in London in 1973.
