= June 1954 Iraqi parliamentary election =

- 9 June 1954

All 135 seats in the Chamber of Deputies 68 seats needed for a majority
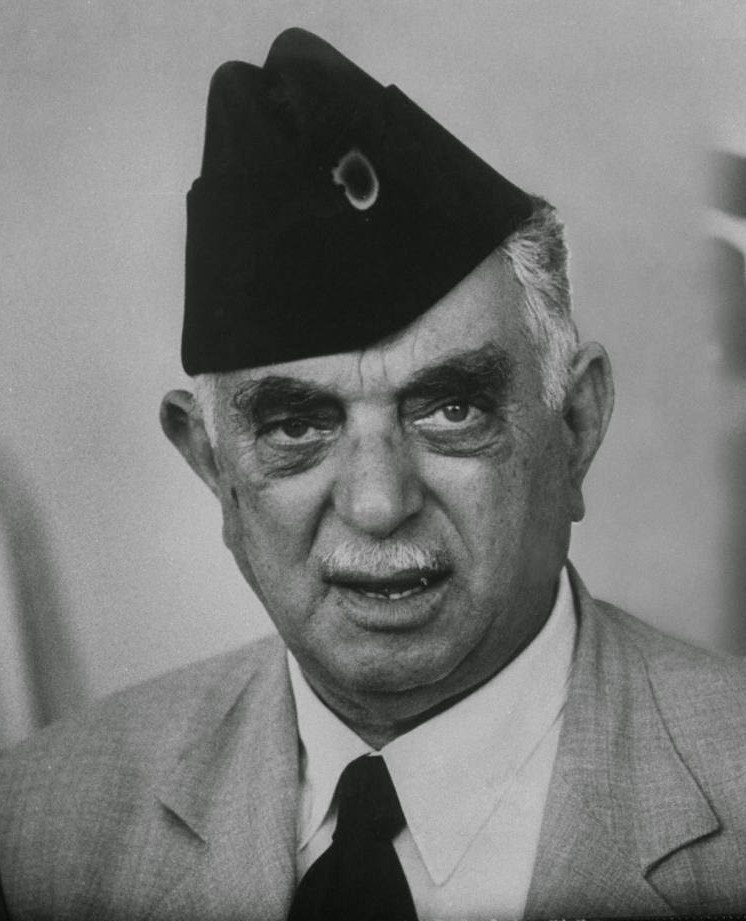

	First party	Second party
Leader	Nuri al-Said	Salih Jabr
Party	CUP	SNP
Last election	67	8
Seats won	50	21
Seat change	▼17	▲13
Prime Minister before election
Arshad al-Umari
Independent
Elected Prime Minister
Arshad al-Umari
Independent

Parliamentary elections were held in Iraq on 9 June 1954, although they were delayed until 14 June in some areas due to social upheaval. The Constitutional Union Party remained the largest party in the Chamber of Deputies, winning 50 of the 135 seats, although 53 were won by independents. Despite the government creating obstacles for opposition candidates, they were described as "undoubtedly the freest elections in Iraqi history" in 2001.

== Results ==
Party	Seats	+/–
Constitutional Union Party	50	–17
Socialist Nation Party	21	+13
National Patriotic Front	10	New
United Popular Front	1	–10
Independents	53	+5
Total	135	0
Source: Nohlen et al.

== Aftermath ==
Due to his concerns about the opposition's strength, Nuri al-Said sought to dissolve the parliament. King Faisal II dissolved the newly elected parliament on 3 August and early elections were held in September.
