= 1943 Iraqi parliamentary election =

Parliamentary elections were held in Iraq between 20 August and 5 October 1943. The election of the secondary voters was carried out between 20 and 31 August 1943, whilst the election of the members of Chamber of Deputies was held on 5 October 1943.

== Background ==
The parliament elected in 1939 was dissolved on 9 June 1943 after completing its four-year term. The Nuri al-Said government and the Ministry of Interior immediately started preparing for fresh elections.

== Results ==
Most incumbent MPs were re-elected, and only 26 new members were voted into parliament. The newly elected parliament convened on 4 November 1943, with a vote held for a new Speaker on 1 December 1943. Mohammed Ridha al-Shabibi, supported by the opposition, competed with Salman al-Barrak, a pro-government candidate; al-Shibibi won by a vote of 73–64.

== Aftermath ==
As a consequence of the 1941 pro-Axis coup and subsequent British invasion, the new government sought to curtail all hostile political activities. On 17 November 1943, parliament approved an amendment to the constitution, allowing the king (or regent) to dismiss the government and to declare (with the Council of Ministers), a state of emergency in cases of a rebellion or disturbance of peace. Another amendment prevented parliament from pardoning those convicted of offenses aimed at changing the form of government. Political parties were banned. However, labour unions were permitted. Between 1944 and 1946, 16 unions were formed, most of which came under the control of the Iraqi Communist Party. In 1946, the ban on political parties was lifted.
