= Mohammed Hassan al-Sadr =

Prime minister of Iraq in 1948

Sayyid Mohammed al-Sadr
- محمد الصدر
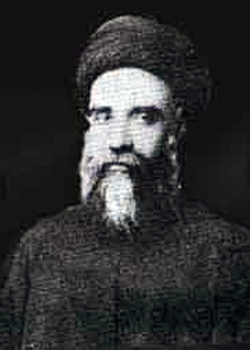

Prime Minister of Iraq
- In office 29 January 1948 – 26 June 1948
- Monarch: Faisal II
- Regent: Prince Abdullah
- Preceded by: Salih Jabr
- Succeeded by: Muzahim al-Pachachi

Personal details
- Born: Mohammed Hassan al-Sadr; 7 January 1882
- Died: 3 April 1956 (aged 74)
- Party: Independent
- Relations: Muqtada al-Sadr; Mohammad Baqir al-Sadr; Musa as-Sadr

Sayyid Mohammed Hassan al-Sadr (Note: Arabic: محمد حسن الصدر, romanized: Muḥammad Ḥasan aṣ-Ṣadr) (7 January 1882 – 3 April 1956) was an Iraqi Shi'ite statesman. He served as Prime Minister of Iraq from 29 January 1948 to 26 June 1948.

== Life ==
Mohammed Hassan al-Sadr was born in 1882 to the notable Shia jurist, Sayyid Hassan bin Hadi bin Muhammad-Ali al-Sadr in Baghdad. A member of the prominent Sadr family, claiming descent from Muhammad, he received a traditional Islamic education. An active Arab nationalist before World War I, in 1919/20 he founded the nationalist party National Guard (al-Haras al-Watani) and helped organize the Iraqi revolt against the British. Escaping arrest by fleeing to Najd, he subsequently returned to Iraq. He was appointed to the Senate of Iraq, and served as its President from November 1929 to February 1937, and from December 1937 to December 1943.

In January 1948, the signing of the Portsmouth treaty led to the Al-Wathbah uprising and the fall of Salih Jabr's government. Subsequently, al-Sadr became Prime Minister for five months. Though he never returned to executive office afterwards, he served as President of the Senate again in 1948.

al-Sadr died on 3 April 1956.
