= Arshad al-Umari =

Prime minister of Iraq in 1946 and 1954

Arshad Pasha al-Umari
- ارشد باشا العمري
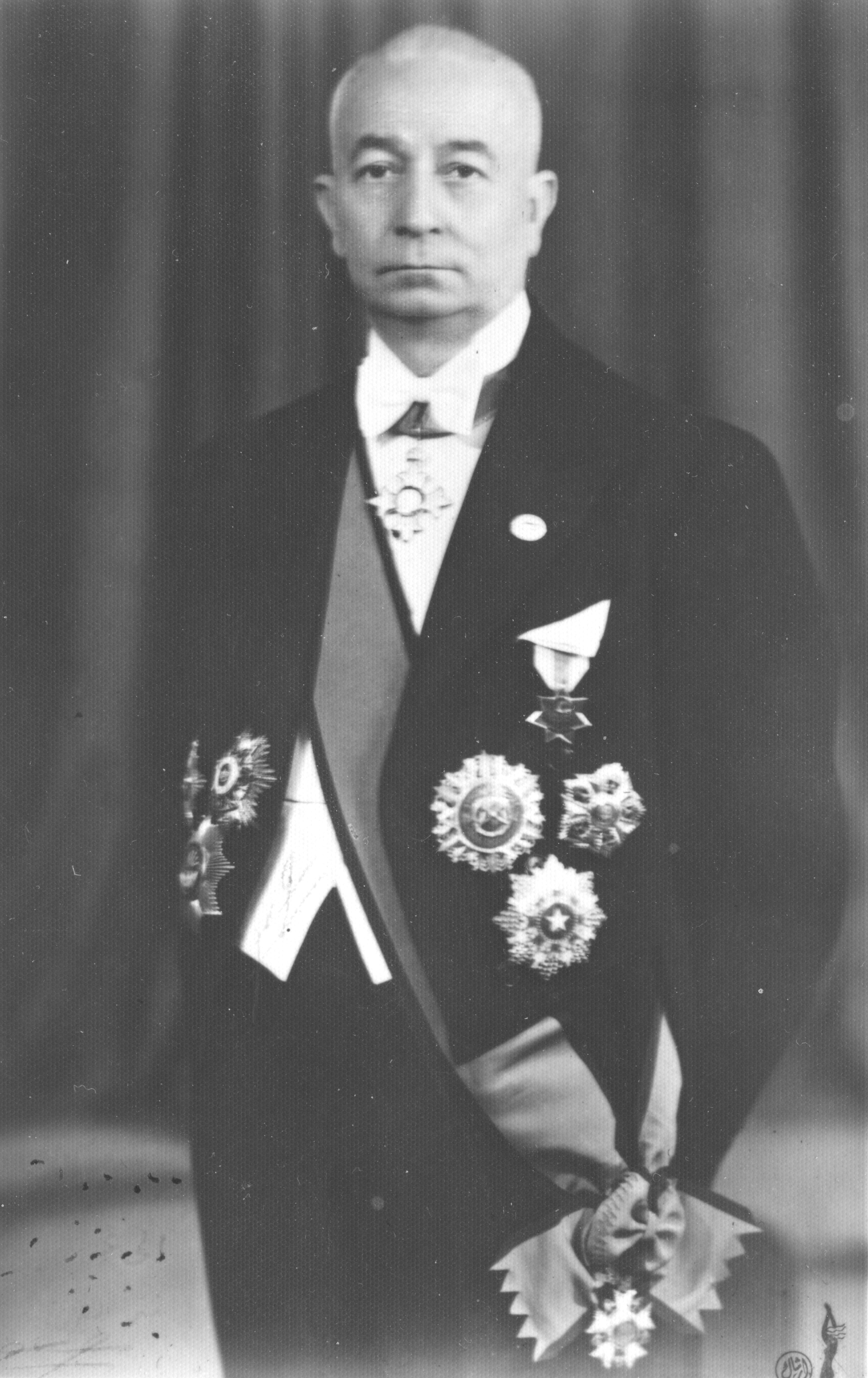

Prime Minister of Iraq
- In office 1 June 1946 – 21 November 1946
- Monarch: Faisal II
- Regent: Prince Abdullah
- Preceded by: Tawfiq al-Suwaidi
- Succeeded by: Nuri al-Said
- In office 29 April 1954 – 4 August 1954
- Monarch: Faisal II
- Preceded by: Muhammad Fadhel al-Jamali
- Succeeded by: Nuri al-Said

Personal details
- Born: 8 April 1888 Mosul, Ottoman Iraq
- Died: 5 August 1978 (aged 90) Baghdad, Ba'athist Iraq

Arshad Pasha al-Umari (Arabic: أرشد العمري; 8 April 1888 – 5 August 1978) was an Iraqi statesman, engineer, diplomate, and cabinet official who held several political roles during the monarchy era of Iraq. Born in Mosul to the ancient and well-known al-Umari family clan that had settled there in the mid-16th century from Mecca in the Hejaz under the patronage of Ottoman emperor Suleiman the Magnificent. He served as Prime Minister of Iraq twice in 1946 and 1954 respectively. In 1945, as Foreign Affairs Minister, he led the Iraqi delegation to the San Francisco UN Conference.

Among al-Umari's achievements was his work to establish the Iraqi Red Crescent Society in 1932 which was a welcoming development by the Iraqi educated elite at the time, the construction of various main roads, dams, including the Kut Barrage, and oil pipes, and sending Iraqi troops to help in the 1948 Arab–Israeli War. However, al-Umari was criticized for his lack of interest in archaeological sites and monuments. Most notoriously, he allowed the demolishment of the Murjan Mosque's walls in favor of road expansion. His first ministry also saw the Gavurbağı incident which damaged his reputation.

== Early life and education ==
Arshad al-Umari was born in Mosul, Iraq on 8 April 1888 when his father was Mayor of Mosul. He obtained his high school degree in 1904 when he was 16 years old. After finishing high school at Mosul he left for Istanbul, the capital of the Ottoman Empire, to complete his studies. He did the trip by horse via Aleppo to the port of Alexandretta on the Mediterranean Sea. Such a trip in those days took about 40 days. From Alexandretta, he took the steamer to Istanbul where he was admitted to the Architectural Division of the Royal Engineering College. The teaching staff of the college were professors from Germany, Belgium and Austria.

He graduated as an architect in 1908, when he was 21 years old, and was appointed to the Architectural Division of the Municipality of Istanbul. When World War I broke out in 1914 he was conscripted as an engineer in the Ministry of Defense and when the war was over in 1918 he returned to the Municipality of Istanbul as Chief Engineer when Cemil Topuzlu was Lord Mayor of Istanbul. He married Rafi'a Khanim, the younger sister of Jamil Pasha the Lord Mayor of Istanbul. Jamil Pasha and Rafi'a Khanim's father was Dhia Pasha who occupied several prominent positions in the Ottoman Empire, the most important of which was the personal supervision of the renovation of the Dome of the Rock in Jerusalem, ordered by the Sultan Abdul Hamid II. He lived with his family for several years in Jerusalem to carry out this job.

After World War I when the Arab countries including Iraq were separated from the Ottoman Empire, al-Umari returned from Istanbul to Mosul, in 1919, with his wife, where he was appointed chief engineer of the Municipality of Mosul and continued until 1924. During this period his four children, Suad, Frozan (Suzy), Issam, and Imad were born in Mosul.

== Political career ==
=== Earlier political roles ===
In 1924, he was elected a member of the first Parliament of Iraq after the formation of the national government of Iraq under King Faisal I. In 1925 he was appointed Director General of Post and Telegraph.

In 1933, he was Director General of Irrigation, and from 1934 to 1935 he was Minister of Public Works. During his Ministership, the opening of the famous oil pipeline from the oilfields at Kirkuk to the Mediterranean over 1,000 kilometres (620 mi) was celebrated. In 1935, he was Director General of Municipalities.

=== Iraqi Red Crescent Society ===
On the formation of the Iraqi Red Crescent Society, he was elected President of the society and continued holding that position until 1958, more than 25 years.

=== Mayor of Baghdad ===
From 1931 to 1933, al-Umari became Lord Mayor of Baghdad for the first time.

From 1936 to 1944, he was Lord Mayor of Baghdad for a second time. The city planning and the general layout of the present modern Baghdad were believed to be one of Iraq's greatest achievements of that period.

=== Minister of Foreign Affairs ===
From 4 June 1944 to 25 August 1945, he was Minister of Foreign Affairs and Deputy Minister of Defense and Supply. During his Ministership of Foreign Affairs, diplomatic relations were established with the USSR and letters were exchanged between him and Vyacheslav Molotov on 11 September 1944. Also during his Ministership, the Arab League was formed and he headed the Iraqi delegations to Cairo, Egypt, and signed the Charter of the Arab League on 22 March 1945.

Al-Umari headed the Iraqi delegation to sign the United Nations charter at San Francisco, California. On the arrival of the Iraqi delegation to New York, President Franklin D. Roosevelt died on 12 April 1945. al-Umari headed the Iraqi delegation at the funeral on 14 April 1945.

On 26 April, the San Francisco Conference consisting of 50 nations met to discuss the draft of the United Nations Organization. Al-Umari, the head of the Iraqi delegation, in protest against the apparent intention of the great powers to partition the British Mandate of Palestine into a Jewish State and an Arab State, refused to sign the charter and left the conference returning to Iraq on June 13, 1945. On June 26 the Charter was signed with Dr. Muhammad Fadhel al-Jamali signing it on behalf of Iraq.

After his return to Iraq, al-Umari resigned from the cabinet as Minister of Foreign Affairs on 25 August 1945.

=== Serving as Prime Minister of Iraq twice ===
From the first of June to mid-December 1946, he was Prime Minister of Iraq for the first time. During this time, Turkoman workers were demanding their labor rights. On July 7, 1946, the Iraqi Minister of Economy, Baba Ali Sheikh Mahmud, went to the Ministry of al-Umari in Kirkuk, pressuring him to put an end to the protests, one way or another. However, al-Umari could not persuade them to stop protesting and began using threats and intimidation, which did not work either. Protesting workers responded by gathering in Gavurbağı Park, and then Iraqi police arrived and began shooting at the workers. 16 workers were killed and 30 were injured in the attack. The event caused a general uproar which caused al-Umari to embark on a repressive policy, which allowed arrests to take place, and the closure of newspapers. In response, further strikes by printing and railway workers took place which led al-Umari to declare martial law.

During this period, the Iraqi Kurdish Democratic Party held its founding congress in Baghdad in 1946, bringing together general Mustafa Barzani and many of his ethno-nationalist allies and groups under Barzani's rule. Al-Umari welcomed the group since Barzani wasn't willing to provoke any radical changes in the country. Regent Abd al-Ilah started to lose confidence in al-Umari. Particularly, the declaration of martial law, especially before the 1946 Iraqi parliamentary election. As well as railway and printing workers who went on strike due to al-Umari's repression. This led to the resignation of al-Umari from the Prime Minister's office in November of that year.

In April 1954, he became Prime Minister of Iraq for the second time after al-Jamali resigned from his role as prime minister. He was hired by Regent Abd al-Ilah after disappointed hopes in reform. He was ensigned to form a new government and hold elections despite fears of a repeat of al-Umari's 1946 repressions. The June 1954 Iraqi parliamentary election proved to be the most free Iraqi elections up to this point, at least in the urban areas. The elections gave representation on various fronts. Parties opposed to al-Umari's role as Prime Minister denounced him due to his history of repression of opinions and his lack of belief in democracy. Believing opposition forces will now be harder to contain, al-Umari resigned the premiership in June.

=== Other roles ===
From 29 January to 23 June 1948, he was Minister of Defense. In 1952 he was selected to be the Executive Vice-President of the Development Board. The Development Board was formed to undertake the study and execution of major construction schemes such as the Darbandikhan Dam on the Diyala River, the Dukan Dam on the Little Zab, the Bekhme Dam on the Great Zab, the Samarra Dam on the Tigris and the Lake Tharthar flood protection scheme connected with it, the Mosul Dam on the Tigris, the network of modern highways connecting major cities in Iraq, a great number of hospitals, schools and other public institutions.

== Later life and death ==
In 1958, at the age of 70, he retired to the city of Istanbul. He returned to Iraq in 1968 and spent the rest of his life at the Baghdad residence of his elder son, Issam al-Umari. He died in Baghdad on 5 August 1978 at the age of 90 and was buried at a family cemetery in Mosul.

== Bibliography ==
- Manhal Ismail Al-Ali Bey, Arshad Al-Omari 1888 - 1978, a historical study of his administrative, political and military role. Private publisher, 2006. (In Arabic.)
- Harris M. Lentz III, Heads of States and Governments: A Worldwide Encyclopedia of Over 2,300 Leaders, 1945 through 1992. McFarland & Company, Inc., 1994, p. 411. ISBN 0-89950-926-6.
