= Ibrahim al-Radhi =

Ibrahim al-Radhi was an Iraqi politician. He belonged to the Constitutional Union Party. Al-Radhi was elected to the Chamber of Deputies from Baghdad Liwa in a 1950 by-election. In 1954 he was elected to the Chamber of Deputies from the Fifth Constituency of Baghdad.

Al-Radhi died at a London hospital in October 1954, following a surgery. His body was brought back from Britain to Iraq, and a funeral was held with participation of the Prime Minister, ministers, former ministers, parliamentarians and religious leaders. He was buried at Sheikh Umar cemetery. His brother Ismail al-Radhi was elected unopposed to fill his vacant parliamentary seat.
