= September 1954 Iraqi parliamentary election =

- 12 September 1954

All 135 seats in the Chamber of Deputies 68 seats needed for a majority
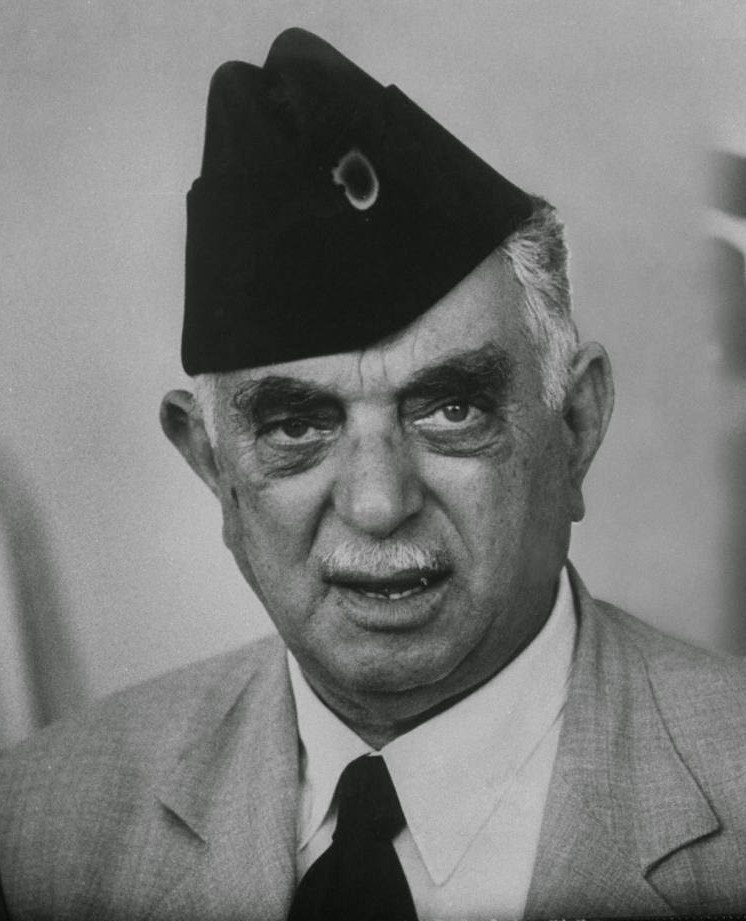

	First party	Second party
Leader	Nuri as-Said	Salih Jabr
Party	CUP	SNP
Last election	50	21
Seats won	94	8
Seat change	▲44	▼13
Prime Minister before election
Nuri al-Said
CUP
Elected Prime Minister
Nuri al-Said
CUP

Early parliamentary elections were held in Iraq on 12 September 1954, after the Chamber of Deputies elected in June was dissolved by the King on 3 August. The Constitutional Union Party remained the largest party, winning 94 of the 135 seats, although only 25 seats were actually contested.

== Results ==
Party	Seats	+/–
Constitutional Union Party	94	+44
Socialist Nation Party	8	–13
Iraqi Independence Party	2	+2
United Popular Front	2	+1
Independents	29	–24
Total	135	0
Source: Nohlen et al.
