= Salih Jabr =

Prime Minister of Iraq from 1947 to 1948

Sayyid Salih Jabr
- صالح جبر
- Salih in 1948

Prime Minister of Iraq
- In office 29 March 1947 – 27 January 1948
- Monarch: Faisal II
- Regent: Prince 'Abd al-Ilah
- Regent: Prince 'Abd al-Ilah
- Preceded by: Nuri al-Said
- Succeeded by: Mohammad Hassan al-Sadr

Minister of Social Affairs
- In office 22 February 1940 – 31 March 1940
- Monarch: Faisal II
- Prime Minister: Nuri al-Said

Minister of Justice
- In office October 1936 – June 1937
- Monarch: Ghazi I
- Prime Minister: Hikmat Sulayman

Personal details
- Born: 1896 Nasiriyah, Ottoman Iraq
- Died: 1957 (aged 60–61) Kingdom of Iraq
- Resting place: Najaf, Iraq
- Party: Socialist Nation
- Other political affiliations: Constitutional Union Party
- Children: 3

Sayyid Salih Jabr (Note: Arabic: صالح جبر, romanized: Ṣāliḥ Jabr) (1896 – 1957) was an Iraqi politician and statesman who served as Prime Minister of Iraq from March 1947 to January 1948. Jabr was the first Shi'i Muslim to become the prime minister of his country and throughout his career held several offices around the country such as the office of minister of justice, education, foreign affairs, interior, and finance.

== Early life and activities ==
Salih Jabr was born in Nasiriyah in 1896. Graduating from Baghdad Law School, Jabr would pursue in becoming a judge and served as one from 1926 until he was elected as part of the Iraqi Parliament in 1930. Under Jamil al-Midfa'i, Jabr became the Minister of Education from 1933 to 1934. After that, he would become the governor of Karbala for a year in 1935. As governor, Jabr established a water project to modernize Karbala and stop the using of basins for daily water use. Jabr also helped store foreign gifts and treasures given to the area under the Imam Husayn Shrine.

In October 1936, after the Golden Square coup d'état of general Bakr Sidqi, Jabr became the Minister of Justice in Hikmat Sulayman's government. During that period, Jabr would meet up with Sidqi, Sulayman, Muhsin Abu-Tabikh, and several significant figures in his house at night to discuss several topics. Due to Jabr belonging to a group of Iraqi politicians advocating extensive social reforms in the country. He was convinced that Sulayman's government had these ideas. Disappointed with the prime minister's pursuit of authoritarian power, his suppression of strikes and protests, and finally the uprising of tribal sheikhs from the Euphrates, he resigned in June 1937 together with three other ministers also demanding reforms: Kamil al-Chadirji, Ja'far Abu al-Timman, and Yusuf Izz al-Din Ibrahim.

After the assassination of Sidqi, Jabr sent a letter to Nuri Pasha al-Said dated 18 August 1937 reporting to the Pasha what had happened during the event.

=== During World War II ===
Jabr once again assumed a government position on 22 February 1940, when he was appointed to Nuri Pasha's cabinet as Minister of Social Affairs. He worked in this office from late February 1940 to 31 March of that same year. After that, he then became the governor of Basra and remained so until the following year. When Nuri al-Said once again became the head of the government in October 194, Jabr became the first Shi'i Muslim Minister of Interior, and the Minister of Foreign Affairs simultaneously; in the latter position in February 1942, he was replaced on 8 October 1942 by Abdullah al-Damluji.

During this period, Jabr supported Nuri al-Said in his policy of eliminating supporters of pan-Arabism from public life, which were seen as associated with the government of Rashid Ali al-Gaylani, which was overthrown with British help. The government of Nuri Pasha sent several hundred political opponents to an internment camp and removed pan-Arabists from the Iraqi army and public administration. However, the activities of Jabr, who took an active part in these activities, were criticized both by Sunni Muslims, who didn't approve of his position, and Shi'i Muslims, who believed Jabr should get more Shi'i Muslims to take vacant positions in the army and offices. Ultimately, he would serve as the Minister of Finance under Nuri Pasha and Hamdi al-Pachachi.

== Prime Minister of Iraq ==
In March 1947, Regent 'Abd al-Ilah entrusted Jabr with the mission of establishing a new government, and with the support of Nuri Pasha for his candidacy, Jabr established a new government. Jabr's government took on the issue of widespread drought in 1946 and 1947, which was severely impacting its wheat and flour production.

=== The Palestine issue ===
One of Jabr's most pressing issues outside of Iraq was the issue of Palestine, which he and others considered to be the main Arab issue. Around March 16, 1946, a joint British-American fact-finding mission arrived in Baghdad to investigate the Palestinian issue. The mission was headed by Sir John Arbuthnot and included conservative members of the British parliament and the owner of the US newspaper the Boston Herald. The mission talked with several leaders in Iraq, including Salih Jabr, the regent 'Abd al-Ilah, and the head Rabbi of the Jewish community, Sassoon Khadouri.

Despite the success of the meetings, the report the committee produced contained fabricated testimonies and numerous inaccuracies that instead went in favor of immigrating 100,000 Iraqi Jews to Palestine, which disregarded the Iraqi perspectives. Jabr and his government condemned the committee's ruling and the interference of Zionist parties in the United States' part, which he considered to be working against the human rights of Palestinians and Iraqis. In response, Jabr invited the Arab League to meet in Sawfar on 16 September 1947 to discuss the ordeal and negotiate with the British. Jabr's minister of foreign affairs, Muhammad Fadhel al-Jamali, was also sent to the United Nations to discuss the issue around the same year.

=== Treaty of Portsmouth ===
Jabr, now Prime Minister and accompanied by Nuri Pasha, initiated talks with the United Kingdom regarding the renegotiation and revision of the Anglo-Iraqi Treaty of 1930. They were conducted in secret, for fear of the outbreak of riots and the mobilization of the political organizations that demanded the immediate departure of British influence from Iraq. Only the final paragraphs of the new treaty were made public and were referred to as the "Treaty of Portsmouth" when it was signed in 1948. The agreement concluded on 15 January 1948 provided for the withdrawal of British troops from Iraq and the transfer of British air bases to Iraq, with the provision that in the event of war, the UK could regain them. In matters of army supplies and training, Iraq was to remain tied to London, and the country's army development projects were to be supervised by a joint Iraqi-British commission. The agreement was to be valid for only 25 years.

The treaty's terms were considered only slightly better than the extremely unpopular treaty of 1930. But despite that, it caused great outrage in Iraq, which was the cause of demonstrations of thousands of Iraqis. The uprisings were called the al-Wathbah Uprisings. The treaty said that the United Kingdom can come to protect Iraq in case of a disaster which prompted a belief at the time that the British were weakening the Iraqi army on purpose to impose its rule on Iraq. Students in Baghdad, and later workers, would stage strikes and stage daily demonstrations on al-Rashid Street. Jabr returned from England to Iraq but was forced to land at the Royal Air Force base at al-Habbaniyya, and return to Baghdad in a disguise. On 26 January 1948, Jabr ordered the police to use machine guns against the protestors, not aware of the large and serious nature of the issue. The police would eventually shoot protestors trying to cross al-Ma'mun Bridge from armored police cars. Up to three to four hundred people were killed as a result. The situation was made worse, and Iraqi poets like al-Jawahiri, whose brother was killed in the massacre, and delivered a poem condemning the shooting at the Haydar-Khana Mosque to a crowd of Iraqis, and al-Sayyab kept the anti-British demonstrations active.

Despite that, Jabr initially insisted on signing the treaty when returning to Iraq. But once the army massacred several protestors in the al-Ma'mun Bridge demonstration, two ministers left the government in protest against the massacre and Abd al-Ilah demanded the resignation of Jabr without him signing the treaty. Jabr would announce that he would not sign the negotiated agreement and had to repudiate it but was accused of treason and attacked even more aggressively by several Iraqi politicians. he left office twelve days after the content of the treaty was announced. After Jabr, Sayyid Muhammad al-Sadr, a veteran politician, succeeded him in becoming prime minister, while Jabr fled from Baghdad to Jordan and then later to England. His resignation caused celebrations in Baghdad.

== Later career ==
Salih Jabr did not completely lose his political influence in Iraq, and in the June 1948 Iraqi parliamentary election, he elected many people from his circle as deputies. The following year, Jabr, alongside these deputies, joined the Constitutional Union Party, founded by Nuri Pasha. Jabr himself took up the position of Minister of Interior for the third time in the government of Tawfiq al-Suwaidi. This government lasted until September 1950. Jabr, as a minister, again fell victim to sectarian issues when he was criticized by Sunni Muslims and accused of corruption and enforcing his doctrine on them. Noticing this backlash even within the Constitutional Union Party, Jabr eventually left the party and formed the Socialist Nation Party, originally called the "Socialist People's Party." Its program was addressed to workers and the younger intellectual class, as well as to Muslims of Shi'i origin from the villages on the Euphrates River, who had already supported Jabr before.

Over time, Jabr became one of the biggest critics of Nuri Pasha al-Said and supporters of electoral reform, enabling his fight against abuse and fraud. However, the opposition's activities did not bring the intended results. In the face of demonstrations inspired by these activities, the regent agreed to electoral reform, but the Constitutional Union Party still won the 1953 Iraqi parliamentary election. Jabr's party would win less than ten seats. Before 1954, Jabr reformed the group into the "Socialist Nation Party," which won 21 seats in the June 1954 Iraqi parliamentary election and expressed its willingness to cooperate with Nuri Pasha and the Constitutional Unionists. The Iraqi Parliament, however, was then dissolved by King Faisal II before it began its work; during the September 1954 Iraqi parliamentary elections, the results of which were allegedly manipulated, the Socialist Nation Party gained only eight seats while the Constitutional Union Party gained 94 seats.

== Death ==
During a session in the Iraqi parliament in 1957, Jabr suffered from a heart attack shortly after giving a speech and passed away after being taken home. His funeral was held the next morning and was buried in Najaf.
