= 1936–1937 Iraqi parliamentary election =

- 10 December 1936– 20 February 1937

All 108 seats in the Chamber of Deputies of Iraq 55 seats needed for a majority
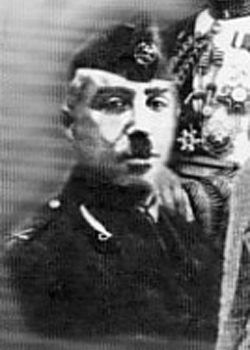

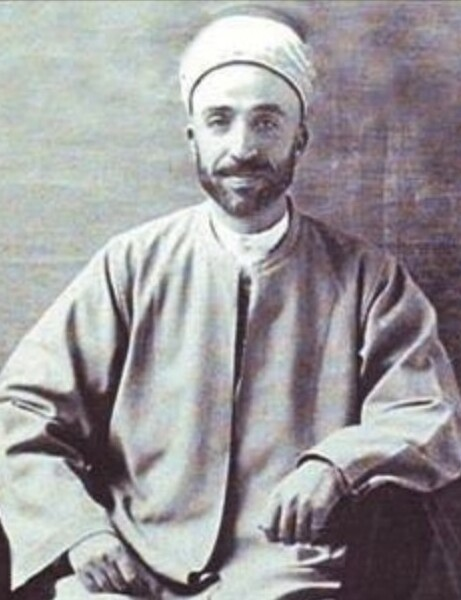
	First party	Second party
Leader	Bakr Sidqi	Ja'far Abu al-Timman
Party	Pro-government (Sidqi's bloc)	Popular Reform
Last election	–	-
Seats won	30	12
Seat change	New	New
PM before election
Hikmat Sulayman
Subsequent PM
Hikmat Sulayman

Parliamentary elections were held in Iraq between 10 December 1936 and 20 February 1937 to elect the members of Chamber of Deputies of Iraq.

== Background ==
After the 1936 military coup led by Bakr Sidqi, disagreement between the parliament led by deposed Prime Minister Yasin al-Hashimi and the left-leaning military government presided over by Hikmat Sulayman, led to the dissolution of parliament on 31 October 1936. The new elections started in December 1936 and were complete by 20 February 1937.

== Results ==
A bloc supportive of coup leader Bakr Sidqi and members of the leftist Popular Reform Party won the elections and were the most prominent political groups in the new parliament. Both groups supported Hikmat Sulayman's government. The new parliaments also included military officers, tribal leaders, nationalists and independent members. Later, the Popular Reform Party was accused of having communist ideology, and was dissolved.

== Aftermath ==
Bakr Sidqi and another coup leader were assassinated on 11 August 1937 in Mosul, and their funerals were held the next day. After losing the support of the military, Sulayman resigned on 17 August 1937. Parliament was dissolved on 26 August 1937 and fresh elections were held on 18 December 1937.
