= 1925 Iraqi parliamentary election =

- 8 June 1925

All 88 seats in the Chamber of Deputies 45 seats needed for a majority
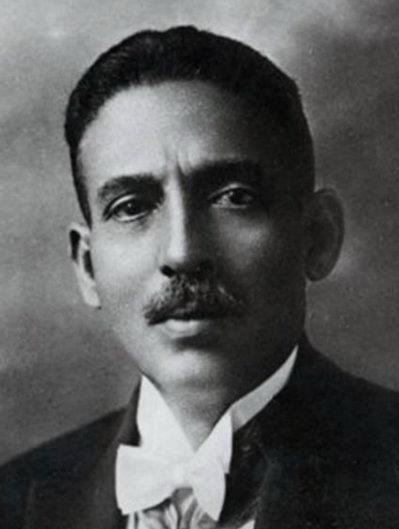

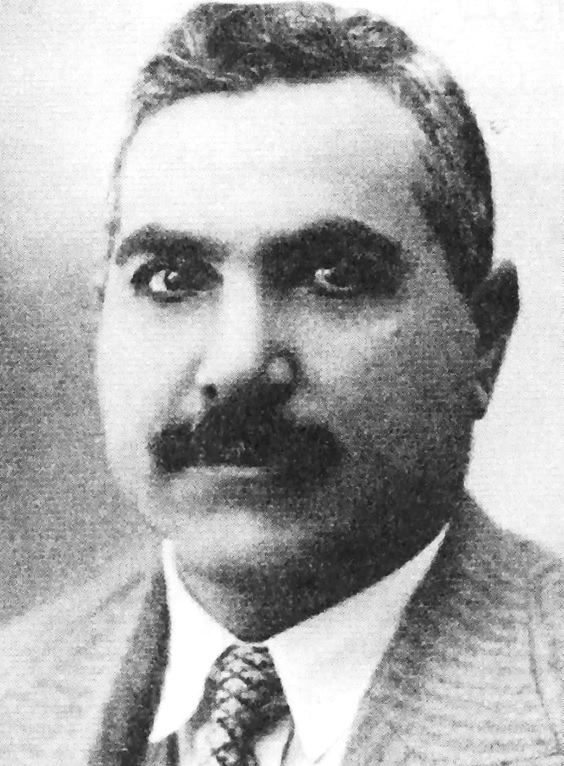
	First party	Second party
Leader	Abdul-Muhsin Al-Saadoun	Yasin al-Hashimi
Party	Progress Party	People's Party
Last election	50	23
Seats won	60	28
Seat change	▲10	▲5
Prime Minister before election
Yasin al-Hashimi
People's Party
Subsequent PM
Abdul-Muhsin Al-Saadoun
Progress Party

Parliamentary elections were held in Iraq in 1925, the first under the 1925 constitution. After the elections, Abdul-Muhsin Al-Saadoun became Prime Minister for the second time and founded the Progress Party to support the government and gain a parliamentary majority.

== Aftermath ==
King Faisal I wanted to remove Al-Saadoun from his office after he tried to reduce the king's powers; Faisal succeeded in persuading the majority of the Chamber of Deputies to vote for Rashid Ali al-Gaylani for speaker, rather than the candidate nominated by the Al-Saadoun government, resulting in Al-Saadoun's resignation. Faisal was also concerned that Al-Saadoun had too many allies in the British government and had the trust of the British High Commissioner, so he made his two loyal men, Nuri al-Said and Jafar al-Askari, join the Progress Party and sabotage it.
