= December 1937 Iraqi parliamentary election =

Parliamentary elections were held in Iraq on 18 December 1937 to elect the members of Chamber of Deputies.

== Background ==
After the assassination of Bakr Sidqi, the military leader of the 1936 coup d'état, Hikmat Sulayman's government resigned. Jamil al-Midfai was selected to form the new government. His government subsequently sought to dissolve the parliament that supported the coup d'état and Sulayman's government. Parliament was eventually dissolved on 26 August 1937.

== Results ==
Elections were held on 18 December 1937 amid public discontent with Sulayman's government and the military coup's leaders. Members of the former Sulayman government, leftists, pro-military candidates were defeated in the elections. The new parliament convened on 23 December 1937 and most members supported al-Midfai continuing as Prime Minister.

== Aftermath ==
The new parliament continued its meetings until the al-Midfai government resigned on 25 December 1937 and a new government was formed by Nuri al-Said. Due to disagreement within the new government, Parliament was dissolved again on 22 February 1939 and fresh elections were held in March 1939.
