= 1953 Iraqi parliamentary election =

- 17 January 1953

All 135 seats in the Chamber of Deputies 68 seats needed for a majority
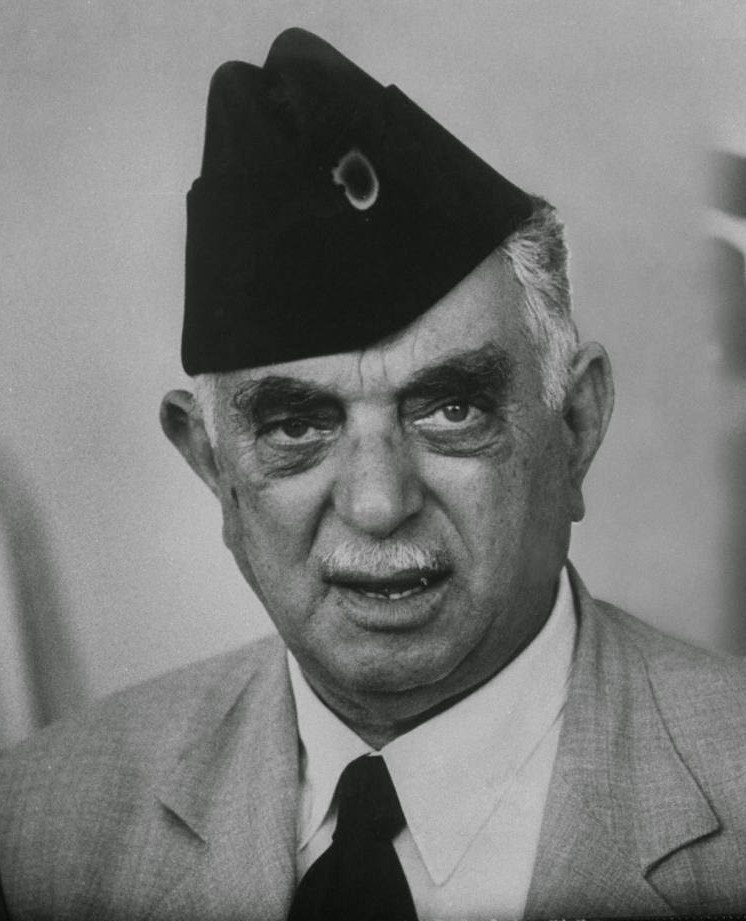

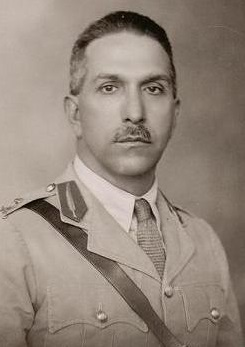
	First party	Second party
Leader	Nuri as-Said	Taha al-Hashimi
Party	CUP	UPF
Last election	–	–
Seats won	67	11
Seat change	New	New
Prime Minister before election
Nureddin Mahmud
Independent
Elected Prime Minister
Jamil al-Midfai
Independent

Parliamentary elections were held in Iraq on 17 January 1953 to elect the members of the Chamber of Deputies. The result was a victory for the Constitutional Union Party, which won 67 of the 135 seats. Only 57 seats were contested.

== Results ==
Party	Seats	+/–
Constitutional Union Party	67	New
United Popular Front	11	New
Socialist Nation Party	8	New
Iraqi Independence Party	1	−4
Independents	48	−82
Total	135	–3
Source: Nohlen et al.
