= Al-Wathbah uprising =

1948 protests in Baghdad, Iraq

| Date | January 1948 |
| Location | Kingdom of Iraq |
| Result | Restoration of order; More demonstrations in spring 1948 |

Belligerents
| (Iraq) Iraqi Police | Student Cooperation Committee (communists); Progressive Democrats; Populists; Kurdish Democrats; Student wings of the National Democratic Party and the Independence Party |

Commanders and leaders
| (Iraq) Faisal II (Iraq) Nuri al-Said | Yusuf Salman Yusuf (Fahd) |

Casualties and losses
- 300–400 killed

The Al-Wathbah uprising (Arabic: انتفاضة الوثبة) or simply Al-Wathbah (Arabic: الوثبة), which means The Leap in Arabic, was a term that came to be used for the urban unrest in Baghdad in January 1948.

The violent protests were sparked by the monarchy's plans to renew the 1930 Anglo-Iraqi Treaty, which effectively made Iraq a British protectorate. Iraqi Prime Minister Nuri al-Said was planning on renewing, albeit in a revised form, the unpopular treaty, which tied Iraq to British interests.

Ultimately, the protests caused the Iraqi government to suspend its plans to renew the treaty.

== History ==
In 1947, the Kingdom of Iraq entered into secret negotiations with the United Kingdom government. The various political parties in Iraq were not informed of the negotiations and instead heard about them on the radio or read about them in the newspapers the following day.

Although the news on the treaty sparked the al-Wathbah protests, it soon became clear that elements of unrest went beyond the opposition to the treaty. The participants in the demonstrations included workers, students and the urban poor, who lived on the outskirts of Baghdad. Many of the protests were orchestrated by the Iraqi Communist Party. The uprising /sprang from the same conditions of existence that had since the first years of the forties been making for the advance of communism"<.

The rigid boundaries of class in Iraqi society, widespread poverty in the urban centres and the growing student population were other factors that contributed to the events of January 1948. In addition, the purchasing power of workers was at a historic low, which contributed to growing frustrations for salaried workers.

== Events ==
On January 3, Iraqi Foreign Minister Fāḍil al-Jamālī was reported to have said that the Iraqi people were "sensitive to the merits" of the 1930 Anglo-Iraqi Treaty. That night, the Iraqi Independence Party held a secret meeting in its headquarters, planning a public protest against the government.

On January 4, students from Al-Karkh and Al Adhamiya Secondary Schools joined up to protest al-Jamālī's statements. They marched toward the School of Law with the intent on continuing on toward the Royal Palace. When they arrived in the vicinity of the School of Law, police attempted to break up the protest. Students from the School of Law left their classrooms to join the protest. The police used clubs and fired shots to disperse the protest. Many students were wounded, and 39 were arrested (six of whom were members of the Iraqi Communist Party or the related National Liberation Party), and the School of Law was closed down.

On January 6, students from all colleges went on strike.

On January 8, the authorities released the arrested students, and the strike ceased.

On January 16, it was announced that the Iraqi government had signed a treaty in Portsmouth that effectively renewed its alliance with Britain. At the announcement, a three-day strike of college students occurred during which they protested in the streets.

On January 16, there were large-scale student protests. Although they were somewhat spontaneous in nature, they coalesced by several political organisations: the communist "Student Cooperation Committee", the Progressive Democrats, the Populists, the Kurdish Democrats and the student wings of the National Democratic Party and the Independence Party.

On January 20, there was a large-scale student march. For the first time since the beginning of the unrest, other social groups joined the students: the Schalchiyyah workers and the poor shantytown dwelling migrants from south-eastern Iraq known as the Shargāwiyyīn. The police responded by firing directly at the demonstrators. The demonstrators, however, did not disperse.

On January 21, the demonstrations escalated. The police fired on students who were transporting those who had been killed the day before. Members of the faculty at the School of Pharmacy and Medicine resigned from their posts. Protests spread in the streets including non-students and many Communists. "An atmosphere redolent of social revolution enveloped Baghdad".

That night, the king of Iraq annulled the treaty. His disavowal of the treaty split the opposition in two camps. Some, such as the Independence Party and the National Democratic Party, called fror ceasing the protests. The Communist Party called on protesters to continue since they had nearly overthrown the government.

On January 23, new demonstrations convened by students, members of the Independence Party and workers. Scuffles broke out between members of the Independence and the Communist Parties.

On January 26, Salih Jabr and Nuri al-Said returned to Baghdad from London. In a radio address that very night, Jabr asked for the people to remain calm and stated that details of the treaty would soon be provided. Immediately, a great number of people went out on the streets. Many reported hearing machine gunfire in the night.

On January 27, the Central Committee of the Communist Party released and distributed a manifesto that called for continued protests. It claimed that imperialists had infiltrated the demonstrations and acted in such a way as to justify the government's violent intervention. The manifesto called on the protesters to continue their struggle until the government had been toppled and a democratic government established in its wake.

Students and workers, coming from the popular areas of Baghdad, gathered to protest. A large group attempted to cross the bridge into West Baghdad where they would meet with students and the Schalchiyyah rail workers. In Al-Rasafa, the police opened fire on a group of Communists, killing four. Despite their losses, they kept marching forward and arriving in Amīn square, they were stopped by new police reinforcement.

On the other side of the river, new clashes broke out between protesters. After they moved onto the Ma’mūn Bridge, the police fired directly onto the crowd with machine guns and killed scores. Many fell into the river. Meanwhile, the demonstrations in Amīn Square escalated and again, and police fired directly onto the crowds. While the demonstrators regrouped in various locations, the police withdrew.

It is estimated that 300 to 400 demonstrators were killed.

== Aftermath ==
On the evening of January 26, Salih Jabr fled to England. The king entrusted a Shi’ī religious scholar, who had been involved in the 1920 Iraqi Revolt against the British, with forming a new government.

The Iraqi government blamed foreign agitators for the January uprisings and pointed to the Saudi support for the Independence Party and the Soviet Union's links to the Communist Party. The government claimed that the Communists had received major donations from Jewish communists. However, records indicate that the Communist Party spent very little money in January 1948, which supports the idea that the demonstrations were spontaneous and enjoyed widespread popular support.

The uprising strengthened the Communist Party. However, the new recruits were not trained, and Yusuf Salman Yusuf (Fahd) and 125 other senior communists were in the prison of Kut. The Communist Party more or less merged ideologically with the National Liberation Party and literally with the National Revolutionary Committee.

After the uprising, the Communists' ideology was radicalised. One of the major issues that came to the fore was whether the party should cooperate strategically with the national bourgeoisie against the monarchy.

However, in the spring of 1948, a number of protests and strikes took place:

- Railway strikes occurred on March 18, April 14 and May 12.
- Strikes at the port occurred April 4, April 6, May 2 and May 18
- The K3 oil pump was immobilised by workers from April 23 to May 15.
- In April, the Communist Party organised the first national student congress at which the General Union of Iraqi Students was founded.
- In April, peasants led an uprising in the village of Arbat: "The workers demanded wage increases, 'bread and shoes,' democratic rights, the release of political prisoners, and national independence".

In May, the demonstrations were ended by the government's declaration of martial law after the outbreak of war in Palestine.

Although many different factions came together for the protests, and the Liberal and National Democrats cooperated with the Communists, there was no further collaboration on their respective opposition to the monarchy. By the end of 1948, the Communist Party was in shambles, with many of its leaders in prison. It was ideologically discredited after it had followed the Soviet line of accepting both the partition of Palestine and the establishment of Israel in the summer.

However, another effect of the uprising was that "the opposition parties responsible for organising the demonstrations were discovering new, immediate forms of power, denied to them both by their small numbers and by the rigging of the parliamentary system". The uprising also helped pave the way for the 1952 Iraqi Intifada, the overthrow of the monarchy in the 14 July Revolution and the creation of a republic.

== See also ==
- List of modern conflicts in the Middle East
- 1941 Iraqi coup d'état
- 14 July Revolution

== Sources ==
- Batatu, Hanna. The Old Social Classes and the Revolutionary Movements of Iraq: A Study of Iraq’s Old Landed Classes and of its Communists, Ba’thists, and Free Officers. Princeton: Princeton University Press, 1978.
- Rey, Matthieu. "Manifester en Irak en 1948", Vingtième Siècle. Revue d'histoire, 2010, p. 25-38
- Salucci, Ilario. A People’s History of Iraq: The Iraqi Communist Party, Worker’s Movements, and the Left 1924-2004. Chicago: Haymarket Books, 2005.
- Tripp, Charles. A History of Iraq 3rd Ed. Cambridge: Cambridge University
