= Nationalist Officers' Organization =

Iraqi organization made up of Iraqi officers

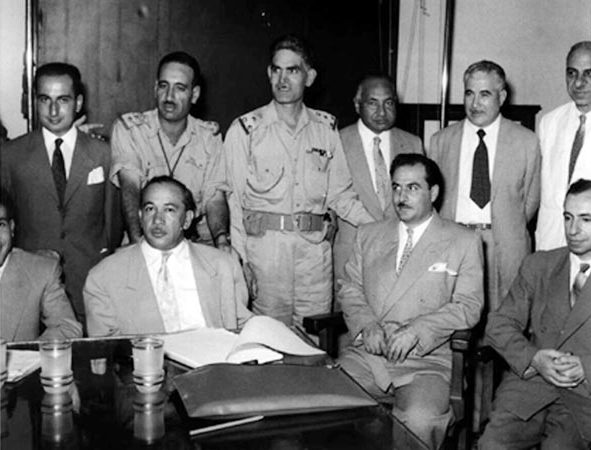
Leaders of the 1958 July revolution, including Khaled al-Naqshabendi (front row, left), Abdul Salam Arif (back row, second from left), Abdul-Karim Qasim (back row, third from left) and Muhammad Najib ar-Ruba'i (back row, fifth from left). Also included is Michel Aflaq (front row, first from right).

The Nationalist Officers' Organization (Arabic: تنظيم الضباط الوطنيين) was a Qasimist organization made up of Iraqi officers which is similar to the Free Officers' Organization in Egypt. The members of this organization arose in the 1958 July revolution, when it led this movement in the toppling of the monarchy and the establishment of a republic.

== Sources ==
- Batatu, Hanna (1978). The Old Social Classes and the Revolutionary Movements of Iraq: a Study of Iraq's Old Landed and Commercial Classes and of its Communists, Ba'thists, and Free Officers. Princeton: Princeton University Press. ISBN 0-691-05241-7
