= Anglo-Iraqi Treaty of 1948 =

1948 treaty between Iraq and the United Kingdom

The Anglo-Iraqi Treaty of 1948, or Portsmouth Treaty of 1948, was a treaty between Iraq and United Kingdom signed in Portsmouth on 15 January 1948. It was a revision of the Anglo-Iraqi Treaty of 1930.

== History ==
During World War II, the United Kingdom had reoccupied Iraq to reverse a pro-Axis coup that had taken place in 1941. By the Treaty of Portsmouth, Sayyid Salih Jabr negotiated British withdrawal from Iraq. However, the agreement consisted of a joint British and Iraqi defence board to oversee Iraq's military planning. Additionally, the British continued to control Iraqi foreign affairs.

When the treaty was signing, Britain's strategic goal was to form an Arab bloc, which would be anti-Soviet and pro-British. After it had convinced Syria, Jordan and Egypt to join, Britain conceded Mandatory Palestine after the United Nations had approved its partition of into Arab and Jewish states, to Iraq. A military plan was agreed upon by which two Iraqi divisions, armed with modern British weapons, would sweep through Syria and Jordan and join the Arab Legion of Jordan to conquer the planned Jewish and Arab states.

Iraq would still be tied to the British for military supplies and training until 1973, which could not be accepted by Arab nationalists in Iraq. As a staunch reaction to the treaty, Iraqis led the Al-Wathbah uprising against the continued British presence in Iraq. Nuri al-Said repudiated the treaty as a concession offered to the Iraqi and Arab nationalists.

The treaty was repudiated after the Free Officers coup in 1958 removed King Faisal II from power, and his pro-Western policies were reversed.
