= Anglo-Iraqi Treaty of 1930 =

Treaty of alliance between Hashemite Iraq and Britain

The Anglo-Iraqi Treaty of 1930 was a treaty of alliance between the United Kingdom and the British-Mandate-controlled administration of the Hashemite Kingdom of Iraq. The treaty was between Kings George V of the United Kingdom and Faisal I of Iraq. High Commissioner Francis Humphrys signed for the United Kingdom and Prime Minister Nuri as-Said signed for Iraq. The 1930 treaty was based upon the Anglo-Iraqi Treaty of 1922 but took into account Iraq's increased importance to British interests after oil was found in 1927.

== History ==
During the Mesopotamian campaign of the World War I, the British Army (alongside troops from the Commonwealth), fighting for Allies, defeated the forces of the Ottomans in Iraq, which were fighting for the Central Powers. In the aftermath of World War I, British troops remained in the region which became the Kingdom of Iraq. In 1920, after the Ottoman Empire was partitioned, the United Kingdom formally established control over what was to become Iraq under a mandate from the League of Nations.

The Kingdom of Iraq began with the coronation of King Faisal I on 23 August 1921. The 1930 treaty provided a path towards nominal independence for Iraq two years later at the termination of the mandate and upon the entry of Iraq itself as a member of the League of Nations. The main purpose of the treaty was to give the British a variety of commercial and military rights in Iraq after its independence.

== Provisions and effect ==
British Prime Minister Winston Churchill was to write that the 1930 treaty provided that the British could maintain air bases near Basra and Habbaniya "in times of peace" and have the right of transit for military forces and supplies "at all times". In addition, Churchill indicated that the treaty would provide "all possible facilities" including the use of railways, rivers, ports, and airways for the passage of armed forces "during times of war".

The terms of the treaty were used to justify the British invasion and occupation of Iraq after a 1941 nationalist coup, whose leaders had contacts among the Axis powers during World War II.

The British used treaty as a basis for their military occupation, which lasted until the end of 1947. As they prepared to depart Iraq, an attempt was made to get the Iraqi government to sign a new military treaty giving the British greater powers than under the 1930 treaty. While the Anglo-Iraqi Treaty of 1948 was approved, it never came into effect because of large violent demonstrations in Iraq against it during the Al-Wathbah uprising.

== See also ==
- Sykes–Picot Agreement
- Anglo-French Declaration of November 1918
- Treaty of Sèvres
- Anglo-Iraqi Treaty of 1922
- Treaty of Lausanne
- British Mandate of Mesopotamia
- United Kingdom of Great Britain and Northern Ireland
- RAF Iraq Command
- RAF Habbaniya
- RAF Hinaidi
- RAF Shaibah
- 1941 Iraqi coup d'état
- Anglo-Iraqi War

== Bibliography ==
- Churchill, Winston (1950). The Second World War, Volume III, The Grand Alliance. Boston: Houghton Mifflin Company.
- Lyman, Robert (2006). Iraq 1941: The Battles for Basra, Habbaniya, Fallujah and Baghdad. Campaign. Oxford, New York: Osprey Publishing. pp. 96. ISBN 1-84176-991-6.
