= 1939 Iraqi parliamentary election =

Parliamentary elections were held in Iraq on 29 April 1939 to elect the members of the Chamber of Deputies.

== Background ==
Following pressure from army generals and Nuri al-Said, Prime Minister Jamil al-Midfai resigned on 24 December 1938. Al-Said subsequently formed a new government, but MPs who were still loyal to al-Midfai tried to force a vote of no confidence. King Ghazi stepped in and dissolved the Parliament on 23 February 1939. In March, al-Said declared that there was a plot to depose Ghazi and assassinate key political leaders. The plot was linked to Bakr Sidqi's loyalists; al-Said used the incident to carry out a purge of army officers and leftist groups.

On 4 April 1939 Ghazi died in a car accident. Crown Prince Faisal was too young to ascend to the throne, and it was unclear who would assume the position of regent. The dismissed Parliament was reconvened, and Queen Aliya bint Ali testified that it was Ghazi's desire to appoint her brother 'Abd al-Ilah as regent. Many were doubtful about the accuracy of this statement. However, based on her testimony, Parliament elected Abd al-Ilah as regent. The decision was strongly supported by al-Said, who considered Abd al-Ilah an ally. It had previously been decided that fresh elections should be held in the spring of 1939 and al-Said saw this as an opportunity to consolidate power.

== Results ==
Following the elections on 29 April, the new parliament convened on 12 June with al-Said's bloc having won an absolute majority. Al-Said remained Prime Minister and succeeded in introducing regulations that gave the executive branch more power. The regulations enabled the government to censor the media, request supplies, and issue decrees and administrative regulations without parliamentary approval.

== Aftermath ==
At the beginning World War II, the al-Said government severed relations with Germany, removed German officials from Baghdad and allowed British forces to use Iraqi lands in accordance with the Anglo-Iraqi treaty. However, it did not declare war on Germany to maintain neutrality. These measures aggravated the opposition, which considered this policy to be pro-British and a breach of Iraq's neutrality.

Political tension was rising and al-Said was forced to resign. Under pressure from army generals, a coalition government was formed by Rashid Ali al-Gaylani on 18 February 1940. The new government adopted a foreign policy that was less favorable to Britain, and to some extent more sympathetic to Germany. However, al-Gaylani was forced to resign by the regent and al-Said, and a more moderate government was formed by Taha al-Hashimi on 3 February 1941. This government did not last for long, and on 1 April an ultra-nationalist group of army generals overthrew the government in a coup d'état, subsequently forming a military government headed by al-Gaylani. Abd al-Ilah and al-Said both fled Baghdad. Parliament convened and elected Al-Sharif Sharaf to replace Abd al-Ilah as regent. Tensions soon escalated between the al-Gaylani government and the United Kingdom, which led to the Anglo-Iraqi War. British forces occupied Baghdad by the end of May and Abd al-Ilah and al-Said returned to Iraq. Parliament reinstated Abd al-Ilah as a regent. A few months later, al-Said formed a new government, which remained in power until June 1944.
