= Liberal Party (Iraq) =

Liberals' Party حزب الاحرار
- Leader: Tawfiq al-Suwaidi
- Founded: 1946
- Dissolved: 1948
- Headquarters: Baghdad
- Ideology: Classical liberalism; Conservative liberalism; Reformism; Constitutional monarchism; Arab nationalism
- Political position: Centre to centre-right

The Liberal Party (Arabic: حزب الاحرار, also translated as the Liberals' Party / Party of the Free) was an Iraqi political party that was founded in 1946. Tawfiq al-Suwaidi was elected as chairman. The party sought to reform the electoral system, consolidate democracy, improve representation, and reform and modernize the country's administration. The party had great influence in rural Iraq, and it allied with the National Democratic Party. It adopted a moderate stance and supported the Iraqi monarchy. It published the Liberals' Voice (Sawt al-Ahrar) newspaper.
