= Iraqi Independence Party =

Iraqi Independence Party حزب الاستقلال العراقي
- Founder: Muhammad Mahdi Kubba
- Founded: 1946
- Dissolved: 1956
- Preceded by: Al-Muthanna Club
- Merged into: National Union Front
- Newspaper: Liwa al-Istiqlal
- Ideology: Iraqi nationalism
- Political position: Right-wing

The Iraqi Independence Party (Arabic: حزب الاستقلال العراقي, Hizb al-Istiqlal al-Iraqi) was an Iraqi nationalist political party founded in December 1945 that supported the independence of Iraq from British colonialism.

== History ==
Its origins began with the predecessor Al-Muthanna Club and many of its members had supported the pro-Axis and anti-British 1941 coup by Rashid Ali al-Gaylani. In 1956 the party was merged alongside the Ba'ath Party, the Iraqi Communist Party and the National Democratic Party into the National Union Front.

The party was right-leaning ideologically, and strengthened by a strong base of popular support, and alongside the Liberal Party and the National Democratic Party, managed to provide a vigorous opposition to the ruling Constitution Union Party. The party won the most seats of any single part in the 1948 election, although lost all but one seat in 1953. The party later made a small comeback in the September 1954 election.

The party cooperated with the Iraqi Free Officers movement from 1953 onward to push for reforms to the government that eventually resulted in the overthrow of the Iraqi monarchy in 1958.

The party had its own newspaper, Liwa al-Istiqlal (Flag of Independence).

== See also ==
- Guardians of Independence
