= 14 July Revolution =

Iraqi military coup in 1958

Iraqi revolution
- Part of the Arab Cold War
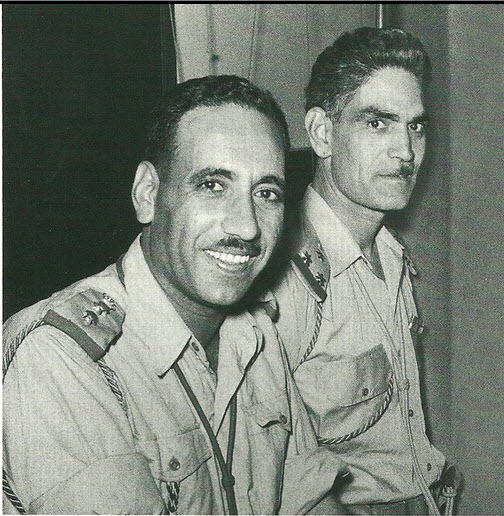
- Abdul Salam Arif and Abdul-Karim Qasim, the leaders of the revolution
Date	14 July 1958
Location	Iraq
Result	Free Officers victory; Overthrow of the Iraqi monarchy; Execution of King Faisal II and his family; Execution of Prince Abd al-Ilah; Execution of Prime Minister Nuri al-Said; End of the Hashemite dynasty in Iraq; End of the Arab Federation; Establishment of the Iraqi Republic

Belligerents
Arab Federation; Kingdom of Iraq; Royal Guard; Supported by: Kingdom of Jordan	(Iraq) Free Officers; 19th Brigade; 20th Brigade

Commanders and leaders
(Kingdom of Iraq) King Faisal II (executed) (Kingdom of Iraq) Prince Abd al-Ilah (executed) (Kingdom of Iraq) Nuri al-Said (executed) (Jordan) Ibrahim Hashem X	(Iraq) Abdul-Karim Qasim (Iraq) Abdul Salam Arif (Iraq) Muhammad Najib ar-Ruba'i (Iraq) Rifaat-Mustafa Al-Haj Sirri (Iraq) Nadhim Al-Tabakjali

Strength
15,000 troops	

Casualties and losses
- (United States) 3 US citizens killed (Jordan) Number of Jordanian officials killed Total: ~100 killed

The 14 July Revolution, also known as the 1958 Iraqi military coup, was a military coup that took place on 14 July 1958 in Iraq, resulting in the toppling of King Faisal II and the overthrow of the Hashemite-led Kingdom of Iraq. The Iraqi Republic established in its wake ended the Hashemite Arab Federation between Iraq and Jordan that had been established just six months earlier.

The Kingdom of Iraq had been a hotbed of Arab nationalism since the Second World War. Unrest mounted amid economic malaise and widespread disapproval of Western influence, which was exacerbated by the formation of the Baghdad Pact in 1955, as well as Faisal's support of the British-led invasion of Egypt during the Suez Crisis. Prime Minister Nuri al-Said's policies were unpopular, particularly within the military ranks. Opposition groups began to organize in secret, modelling themselves after the Egyptian Free Officers Movement that overthrew the Egyptian monarchy in 1952. Pan-Arabic sentiment in Iraq was further bolstered by the creation of the United Arab Republic in February 1958 under the leadership of Gamal Abdel Nasser, a staunch proponent of anti-imperialist causes.

In July 1958, units of the Royal Iraqi Army were dispatched to Jordan in support of King Hussein. A group of Iraqi Free Officers, led by Brigadier Abdul-Karim Qasim and Colonel Abdul Salam Arif, took advantage of the opportunity and instead marched on Baghdad. On 14 July, revolutionary forces seized control of the capital and proclaimed a new republic, headed by a Revolutionary Council. King Faisal and Crown Prince Abd al-Ilah were executed at the royal Al-Rehab Palace, bringing an end to the Hashemite dynasty in Iraq. Prime Minister al-Said attempted to flee but was captured and shot a day later. After the coup, Qasim assumed the position of Prime Minister and Minister of Defence, while Arif was named Deputy Prime Minister and Minister of the Interior. A provisional constitution was adopted in late July. By March 1959, the new Iraqi government had withdrawn from the Baghdad Pact and aligned itself with the Soviet Union.

== Pre-coup grievances ==
=== Regional disturbances ===
During the Second World War, Iraq was home to a growing number of Arab nationalists. They aimed, in part, to remove British imperial influence in Iraq. This sentiment grew from a politicised educational system in Iraq and an increasingly assertive and educated middle class. Schools served as instruments to internalise Pan-Arab nationalist identity as the leaders and the designers of the Iraqi educational system in the 1920s and 1930s were Pan-Arab nationalists who made a significant contribution to the expansion of that ideology in Iraq as well as the rest of the Arab world. The two directors of the educational system in Iraq, Sami Shawkat and Fadhil al-Jamal, employed teachers who were political refugees from Palestine and Syria. These exiles fled to Iraq because of their roles in anti-British and anti-French protests, and subsequently fostered Arab nationalist consciousness in their Iraqi students. The growing general awareness of Arab identity led to anti-imperialism.

Similarly, Pan-Arab sentiment grew across the Arab world and was promoted by Egypt's Gamal Abdel Nasser, a rising politician and staunch opponent of imperialism. Hashemite Iraq faced and confronted these sentiments as well. Nuri al-Said, the Iraqi Prime Minister during most of the 1930s, 1940s and 1950s, was interested in pursuing the idea of a federation of Arab States of the Fertile Crescent, but was less enthusiastic about a Pan-Arab state. Al-Said brought Iraq into the Arab League in 1944, seeing it as a forum for bringing together the Arab states while leaving the door open for a possible future federation. The League's charter enshrined the principle of autonomy for each Arab state and referenced pan-Arabism only rhetorically.

=== Economic climate ===
The Iraqi economy fell into a recession and then a depression following the Second World War; inflation was uncontrolled and the Iraqi standard of living fell. Al-Said and the Arab Nationalist regent, Abd al-Ilah, were continually in opposition to each other, failing to agree on a cohesive economic policy, infrastructure improvements, or other internal reforms.

In 1950, al-Said persuaded the Iraqi Petroleum Company to increase the royalties paid to the Iraqi government. Al-Said looked to the Hashemite Kingdom of Iraq's growing oil revenues to fund and propel development. He determined that 70 percent of Iraq's revenue from oil was to be set aside for infrastructure development by a Development Board with three foreign advisors out of six total members. This foreign presence provoked popular disapproval of al-Said's policy. Despite anti-Western sentiments toward oil and development, al-Said hired Lord Salter, a British economist and former politician, to investigate the prospects for development in Iraq because al-Said's oil revenue reallocation seemed to be ineffective. Lord Salter continued to make suggestions as to how to implement development projects despite massive Iraqi dislike of his presence.

=== Political grievances ===
During the Second World War, the British reoccupied Iraq. In 1947 prime minister Salih Jabr negotiated British withdrawal, formalised on 15 January 1948 by the Anglo-Iraqi Treaty (also known as the Portsmouth Treaty). This agreement included a British and Iraqi joint defence board to oversee Iraqi military planning, and the British continued to control Iraqi foreign affairs. Iraq was still tied to Great Britain for military supplies and training. This 25-year treaty was to last until 1973—a duration that Arab nationalists in the Hashemite Kingdom of Iraq could not accept. As a strong reaction to the Anglo-Iraqi Treaty of 1948, Arab nationalists led the Wathbah Rebellion a year later in protest of the continued British presence in Iraq. Al-Said repudiated the Portsmouth Treaty to appease the rebellious Iraqi and Arab nationalists.

In 1955, Iraq entered into the Baghdad Pact with Iran, Pakistan, and Turkey. The pact was a defence agreement between the four nations and was endorsed by the UK and the United States as an anti-communist Cold War strategy, but was greatly resented by Iraqis in general. Egypt saw the Baghdad Pact as a provocation and a challenge to its regional dominance. In 1956, when Egypt nationalised the Suez Canal, Iraqi-Egyptian relations were further strained. When British, French and Israelis invaded Egypt, Iraq, as a British ally, had to support the invasion. The fact that imperial ties dragged Iraq into supporting this invasion of Arab lands led to wide disapproval across the Iraqi populace, which largely sympathised with Egypt and responded to pan-Arab ideology. It felt that the invasion of Egypt was another sign of Western aggression and dominance in the region.

Similarly, when Egypt and Syria united to form the United Arab Republic (UAR) under the banner of pan-Arabism in 1958, Iraqi politicians found themselves in a vulnerable position. Iraqi leaders had no interest in uniting with Egypt and instead proposed and ratified their own pan-Arab union with Hashemite Jordan in May 1958. Great Britain and the United States openly supported this union, but many Iraqis were suspicious of its purpose and regarded the Hashemite Arab Federation as another "tool of their Western overlord".

=== Precursors ===
The primary goal of the coup was to liberate Iraq from its imperial ties with the British and the United States. The Western powers dominated all sectors of Iraqi governance: national politics and reform, regional politics with its Arab and non-Arab neighbours, and economic policies. As a general rule, many Iraqis were resentful of the presence of Western powers in the region, especially the British. Furthermore, Hashemite monarchic rule could not be divorced from the image of imperial masters behind the monarchy. The monarchy had struggled to maintain power during the Al-Wathbah uprising in 1948 and the Iraqi Intifada of 1952.

=== Discord mounts ===
A growing number of educated élites in the Hashemite Kingdom of Iraq were becoming enamoured with the ideals espoused by Nasser's pan-Arab movement. The ideas of qawmiyah (Nationalism) found many willing adherents, particularly within the officer classes of the Iraqi military. Al-Said's policies were considered anathema by certain individuals within the Iraqi armed forces, and opposition groups began to form, modelled on the Egyptian Free Officers Movement that had overthrown the Egyptian monarchy in 1952.

Despite al-Said's efforts to quell growing unrest within the military ranks (such as economic programmes designed to benefit the officer class, and brokering deals with the U.S. to supply the Iraqi military), his position was significantly weakened by the events of the Suez Crisis. Al-Said suffered for his association with Britain; the latter's role in the Crisis seeming a damning indictment of his wataniyah policies. Despite al-Said's efforts to distance himself from the crisis, the damage was done to his position. Iraq became isolated within the Arab world, as highlighted by its exclusion from the "Treaty of Arab Solidarity" in January 1957. The Suez Crisis benefited Nasser's pan-Arab cause while simultaneously undermining those Arab leaders who followed pro-Western policy. Al-Said's policies fell firmly within the latter camp, and covert opposition to his government steadily grew in the wake of Suez.

=== Building to a crisis ===
On 1 February 1958, Egypt and Syria boosted the pan-Arab movement immeasurably with the announcement that they had united as the United Arab Republic (UAR). The move was a catalyst for a series of events that culminated in revolution in Iraq. The formation of the UAR and Nasser's lofty rhetoric calling for a united Arab world galvanised pan-Arabism in both the Hashemite Kingdom of Iraq and the Hashemite Kingdom of Jordan. Their governments attempted something of a response with the creation of the Hashemite Arab Federation on 14 February—a union of the two states—but few were impressed by this knee-jerk reaction to the UAR.

The Mutawakkilite Kingdom of Yemen (North Yemen) joined the UAR soon after its formation. Attention then shifted to Lebanon, where Syria sponsored the Arab nationalist movement in its civil war campaign against the pro-Western government of Camille Chamoun. Al-Said recognised that Chamoun's defeat would leave Iraq and Jordan isolated. He bolstered Chamoun's government with aid throughout May and June 1958. More fatefully, he attempted to bolster Jordan with units from the Royal Iraqi Army, a move that was a direct catalyst for the coup d'état.

== Coup ==
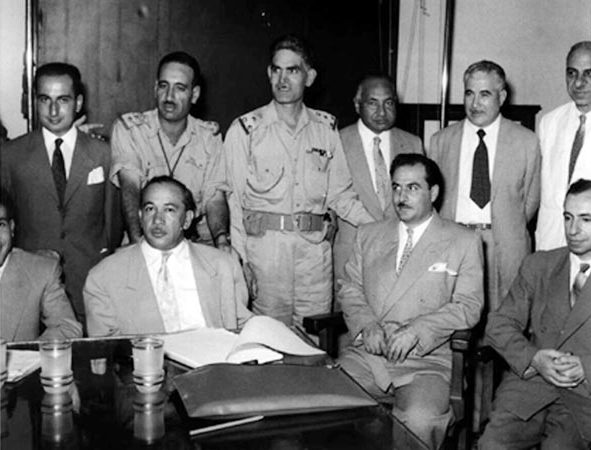
Leaders of the 14 July 1958 revolution in Iraq, including Khaled al-Naqshabendi (front row, left), Abd as-Salam Arif (back row, second from left), Abdul-Karim Qasim (back row, third from left) and Muhammad Najib ar-Ruba'i (back row, fifth from left). Also included is Michel Aflaq (front row, first from right).

On 14 July 1958, a group that identified as the Free Officers, a secret military group led by Brigadier Abdul-Karim Qasim, overthrew the monarchy. This group was markedly Pan-Arab in character. King Faisal II, Prince Abd al-Ilah, and Nuri al-Said were all killed.

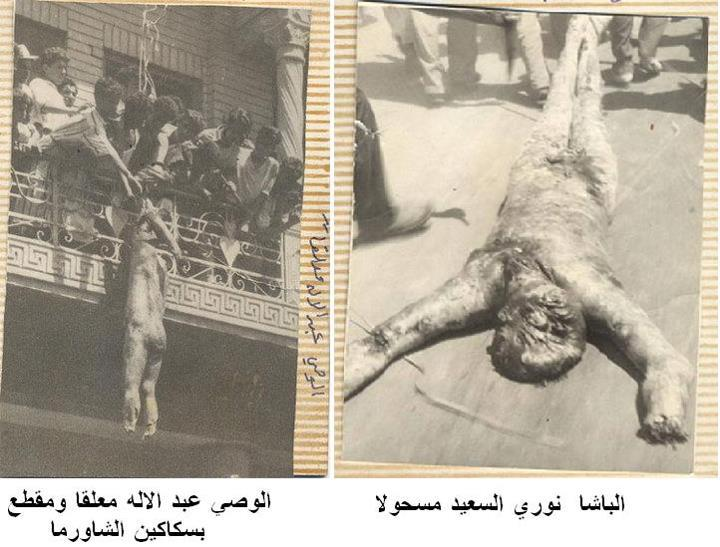
The mutilated corpses of Prince 'Abd al-Ilah of Hejaz (left) and Prime Minister Nuri al-Said (right). Arabic text: "Prince 'Abd al-Ilah hung and cut up by shawerma knives, Pasha Nuri al-Said pulled around."

The Free Officers were inspired by and modelled after the Egyptian Free Officers who overthrew the Egyptian monarchy in 1952. They represented all parties and cut across political factions. Qasim was a member of the generation that had launched the revolution in Egypt, and had grown up in an era where radicalism and pan-Arabism were circulating in schools, including high schools and military academies. As a group, most of the Free Officers were Sunni Arabs who came from a modern middle class. The Free Officers were inspired by a number of events in the Middle East the decade before 1952. The 1948 war against Israel was an experience that intensified the Egyptian Free Officers' sense of duty. They understood their mission as deposing the corrupt regimes that had weakened a unified Arab nation and thrown their countries into distress. The success of the Free Officers in overthrowing the Egyptian monarchy and seizing power in 1952 made Nasser a source of inspiration too.

The Iraqi Free Officer group was an underground organization, and much of the planning and timing rested in the hands of Qasim and his associate, Colonel Abdul Salam Arif. The Free Officers sought to ensure Nasser's support and the assistance of the UAR to implement the revolt because they feared the members of the Baghdad Pact would subsequently overthrow the Free Officers as a reaction to the coup. Nasser only offered moral support, whose material significance remained vague, so Egypt had no practical role in the Iraqi revolution.

The dispatching of Iraqi army units to Jordan played into the hands of two of the key members of the Iraqi Free Officers movement: Arif and the movement's leader, Qasim. The Iraqi 19th and 20th Brigades of the 3rd Division (Iraq) (the former under Qasim's command and the latter including Arif's battalion) were dispatched to march to Jordan, along a route that passed Baghdad. The opportunity for a coup was seized upon by the conspirators.

Arif marched on Baghdad with the 20th Brigade and seized control of the capital, with the help of Colonel Abd al-Latif al-Darraji, while Qasim remained in reserve with the 19th at Jalawla.

In the early hours of 14 July, Arif seized control of Baghdad's broadcasting station, which was soon to become the coup's headquarters, and broadcast the first announcement of the revolution. Arif "denounced imperialism and the clique in office; proclaimed a new republic and the end of the old regime...announced a temporary sovereignty council of three members to assume the duties of the presidency; and promised a future election for a new president".

Arif then dispatched two detachments from his regiment, one to al-Rahab Palace to deal with King Faisal II and the Crown Prince 'Abd al-Ilah, the other to Nuri al-Said's residence. Despite the presence of the crack Royal Guard at the Palace, no resistance was offered, by order of the Crown Prince. It is uncertain what orders were given to the palace detachment, and what level of force they detailed.

At approximately 8:00 am the King, Crown Prince, Princess Hiyam ('Abd al-Ilah's wife), Princess Nafissa ('Abd al-Ilah's mother), Princess Abadiya (Faisal's aunt), other members of the Iraqi Royal Family, and several servants were killed or wounded as they were leaving the palace. Only Princess Hiyam survived, although how and why is unclear. With their demise, the Iraqi Hashemite dynasty ended. Meanwhile, al-Said temporarily slipped the net of his would-be captors by escaping across the Tigris after being alerted by the sound of gunfire.

By noon, Qasim arrived in Baghdad with his forces and set up headquarters in the Ministry of Defence building. The conspirators' attention then shifted to finding al-Said, lest he escape and undermine the coup's early success. A reward of 10,000 Iraqi dinars was offered for his capture, and a large-scale search began. On 15 July he was spotted in a street in the al-Battawin quarter of Baghdad attempting to escape disguised in a woman's abaya. Al-Said and his accomplice were both shot, and his body was buried in the cemetery at Bab al-Mu'azzam later that evening.

Mob violence continued even in the wake of al-Said's death. Spurred by Arif to liquidate traitors, uncontrollable mobs took to the streets of Baghdad. The body of 'Abd al-Ilah was taken from the palace, mutilated and dragged through the streets, and finally hanged outside the Ministry of Defence. Several foreign nationals, including Jordanian and American citizens, staying at the Baghdad Hotel were killed by the mob. A mob invaded the British embassy and set it on fire. The comptroller of the British ambassador's household, Colonel P.L.Graham MC, was shot dead in the embassy building and his body was never recovered. The Ambassador and other British embassy staff were lucky to escape with their lives. After taking refuge in the registry of the embassy, which the mob threatened to burn down, they were escorted to safety by the Iraqi army. Mass mob violence did not die down until Qasim imposed a curfew, which still did not prevent the disinterment, mutilation and parading of Al-Said's corpse through the streets the day after its burial.

== Aftermath ==
=== Immediate effects ===
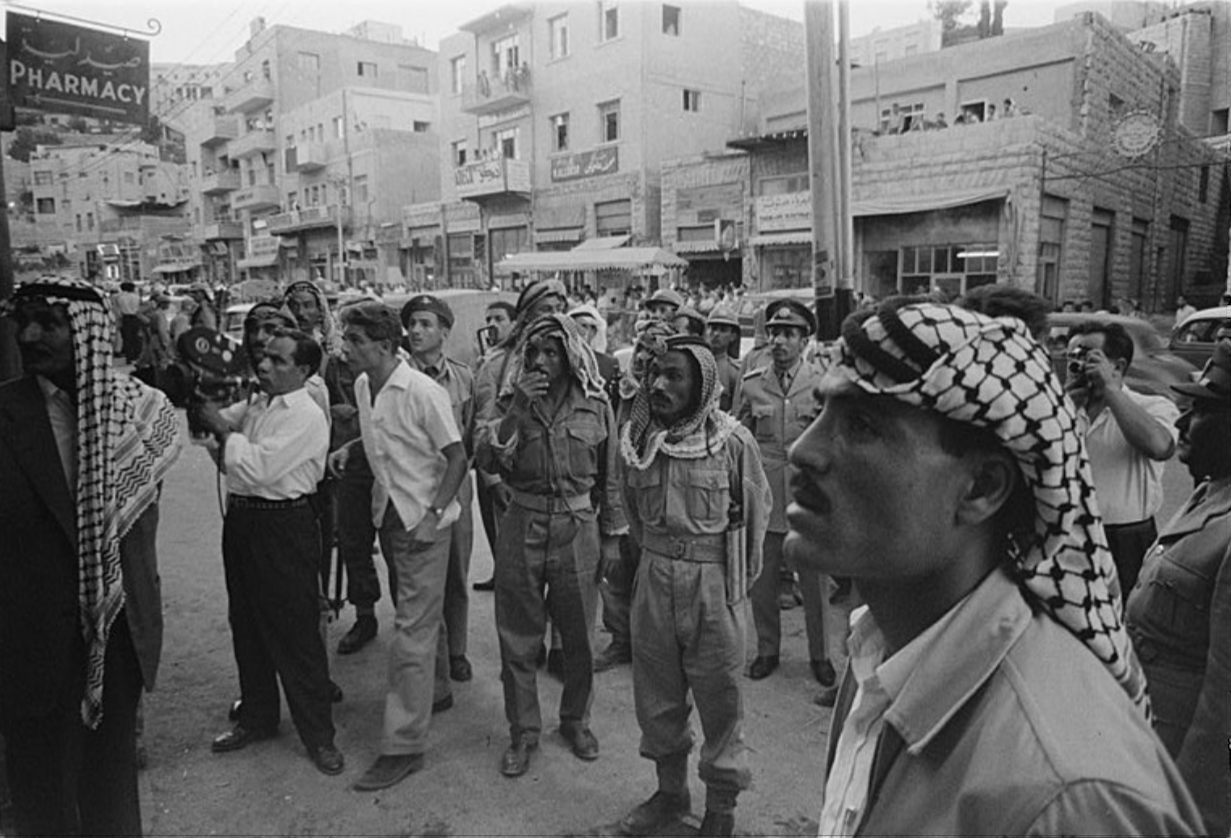
Crowd of men and soldiers in downtown Amman, Jordan, watching a news report about the deposition, 14 July 1958

Abdul-Karim Qasim's sudden coup took the U.S. government by surprise. Central Intelligence Agency (CIA) Director Allen Dulles told President Dwight D. Eisenhower that he believed Nasser was behind it. Dulles also feared that a chain reaction would occur throughout the Middle East and that the governments of Iraq, Jordan, Saudi Arabia, Turkey, and Iran would be doomed. The Hashemite monarchy represented a reliable ally of the Western world in thwarting Soviet advances, so the coup compromised Washington's position in the Middle East. Indeed, the Americans saw it in epidemiological terms.

Qasim reaped the greatest reward, being named Prime Minister and Minister of Defence. Arif became Deputy Prime Minister, Minister of the Interior, and deputy Commander in Chief.

Thirteen days after the revolution, a temporary constitution was announced, pending a permanent organic law to be promulgated after a free referendum. According to the document, Iraq was a republic and a part of the Arab nation and the official state religion was listed as Islam. Both the Senate and the Chamber of Deputies were abolished. Powers of legislation were vested in the Council of Ministers, with the approval of the Sovereignty Council; the executive function was also vested in the Council of Ministers.

=== 1959 instability ===
On 9 March 1959, The New York Times reported that the situation in Iraq was initially "confused and unstable, with rival groups competing for control. Cross currents of communism, Arab and Iraqi nationalism, anti-Westernism and the 'positive neutrality' of President Gamal Abdel Nasser of the United Arab Republic have been affecting the country."

The new Iraqi Republic was headed by a Revolutionary Council. At its head was a three-man sovereignty council, composed of members of Iraq's three main communal/ethnic groups. Muhammad Mahdi Kubbah represented the Shi'a population; Khalid al-Naqshabandi, the Kurds; and Najib al Rubay’i, the Sunni population. This tripartite council assumed the role of the presidency. A cabinet was created, composed of a broad spectrum of Iraqi political movements, including two National Democratic Party representatives, one member of al-Istiqlal, one Ba'ath representative and one Marxist.

By March 1959, Iraq withdrew from the Baghdad Pact and created alliances with left-leaning countries and communist countries, including the Soviet Union. Because of their agreement with the USSR, Qasim's government allowed the formation of an Iraqi Communist Party.

=== Allegations of human rights violations ===
Academic and member of the Iraqi opposition Kanan Makiya compared the trials of political dissidents under the Iraqi monarchy, Qasim's government, and Ba'athist Iraq, concluding: "A progressive degradation in the quality of each spectacle is evident."

== See also ==
- 1941 Iraqi coup d'état
- 1957 alleged Jordanian military coup attempt
- February 1963 Iraqi coup d'état
- Democratic July 14 Movement
- 1959 Kirkuk massacre
- List of modern conflicts in the Middle East
