= National Union Front (Iraq) =

Nationalist political alliance

The National Union Front (Arabic: جبهة الاتحاد الوطني, romanized: Jabhat al-Ittihad al-Watani) was an Iraqi nationalist political alliance formed in 1954 and re-established in 1956 as a coalition of the Ba'ath Party, the Iraqi Communist Party, the Iraqi Independence Party, the National Democratic Party and later the Kurdistan Democratic Party. The alliance supported various Arab nationalist and liberation movements around the world, supporting the governments in Egypt and Syria and supporting the Algerian liberation movement. The alliance splintered and dissolved in the aftermath of the 1958 revolution led by Abd al-Karim Qasim after division across between Arab nationalists and Iraqi communists.
