= Socialist Nation Party =

Nation's Socialist Party حزب الامة الاشتراكي
- Leader: Salih Jabr
- Founded: 1951
- Dissolved: 1958
- Headquarters: Baghdad
- Ideology: Arab nationalism Social democracy Democratic socialism
- Political position: Centre-left

The Socialist Nation Party is an Iraqi political party that was founded by Salih Jabr in 1951. The party sought to gain popularity by adopting socialism, Arab nationalism, and democratic principles. It was faced by enormous amount of skepticism and criticism from the Iraqi press as Jaber was known for having close ties with feudalists and tribal leaders who opposed socialism. The party opposed Nuri al-Said's policies and sought to limit his influence over Iraqi politics. It published two newspapers: Al-Naba' (The News), and al-Umma (The Nation).
