= Ahmad Mukhtar Baban =

Prime minister of Iraq in 1958

- احمد مختار بابان
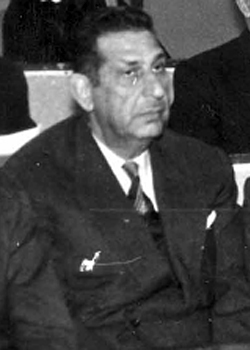
- Ahmad Mukhtar Baban

Prime Minister of Iraq
- In office 18 May 1958 – 14 July 1958
- Monarch: Faisal II
- Preceded by: Nuri al-Said
- Succeeded by: Abd al-Karim Qasim

Personal details
- Born: 1900 Baghdad, Ottoman Empire
- Died: 24 October 1976 (aged 75–76) Amman, Jordan
- Party: Independent
- Spouse: Mrs Baban
- Children: 3
- Education: University of Baghdad
- Occupation: political
- Profession: Lawyer

Ahmad Mukhtar Baban (Arabic: أحمد مختار بابان; 1900 – 24 October 1976) was an Iraqi politician of Kurdish origin and the Prime Minister of Iraq under the Kingdom of Iraq in 1958.

== Biography ==
Baban became prime minister on 19 May 1958, during a time of political tension. The monarchies of Iraq and Jordan had recently agreed upon a confederation known as the Arab Federation. The federation, and Baban's time as prime minister, lasted for only two months.

On 14 July 1958, the monarchy was overthrown in a coup, and a republic was established under Abdul Karim Qassim. Baban was arrested and sentenced to death by the People's Court, which was established under Qassim's leadership following the coup. Unlike the royal family and many Iraqi politicians in the monarchy, the sentence was reduced to life in prison.

Preceded by Nuri as-Said	Prime Minister of Iraq; 1958	Succeeded by Abdul Karim Qassim
