= Regent of Iraq =

The Regent of Iraq (Arabic: وصي العراق, romanized: waṣṣā al-ʿIrāqi) was a position established in 1939 and held by 'Abd al-Ilah until 1953. Regent, from the Latin regens "one who reigns", is a person selected to act as head of state (ruling or not) because the ruler is a minor, not present, or debilitated.

== Reign of Faisal II ==
Image	Name	Regency start	Regency end
Regent during the minority of King Faisal II.
	Crown Prince Abdullah	4 April 1939	1 April 1941; Deposed.
	Sharaf bin Rajeh	1 April 1941	1 June 1941; Fled Iraq.
	Crown Prince Abdullah	1 June 1941	2 May 1953; King Faisal's majority.
