= Constitutional Union Party (Iraq) =

Iraqi political party (1949-1954)

Constitutional Union Party حزب الاتحاد الدستوري
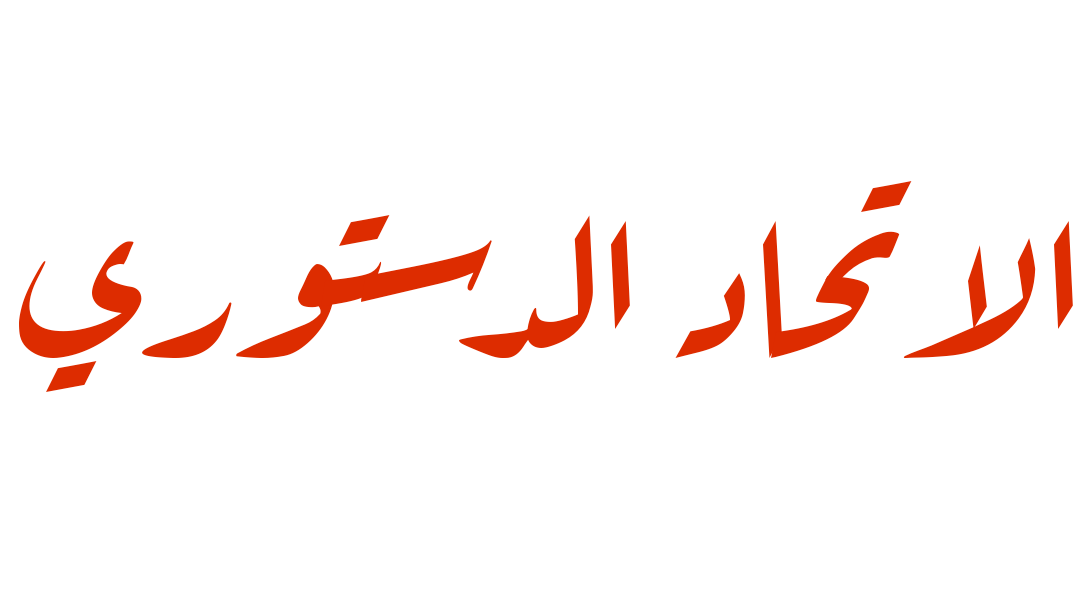
- Leader: Nuri Al-Said
- Founded: 1949
- Dissolved: 1954
- Preceded by: The Convenant Party
- Headquarters: Baghdad
- Ideology: Anti-communism; Arab nationalism Pan-Arabism
- Political position: Centre-right

The Constitutional Union Party (Arabic: حزب الاتحاد الدستوري) was an Iraqi political party that was founded by Nuri al-Said in 1949. The party included politicians from different ethnicities and religions, it was based in Baghdad with its headquarter located at al-Rashid Street. The party held it first conference on 23 December 1949, the conference elected members for the party's Higher Commission, and Nuri Pasha as a chairman.

== Biography ==
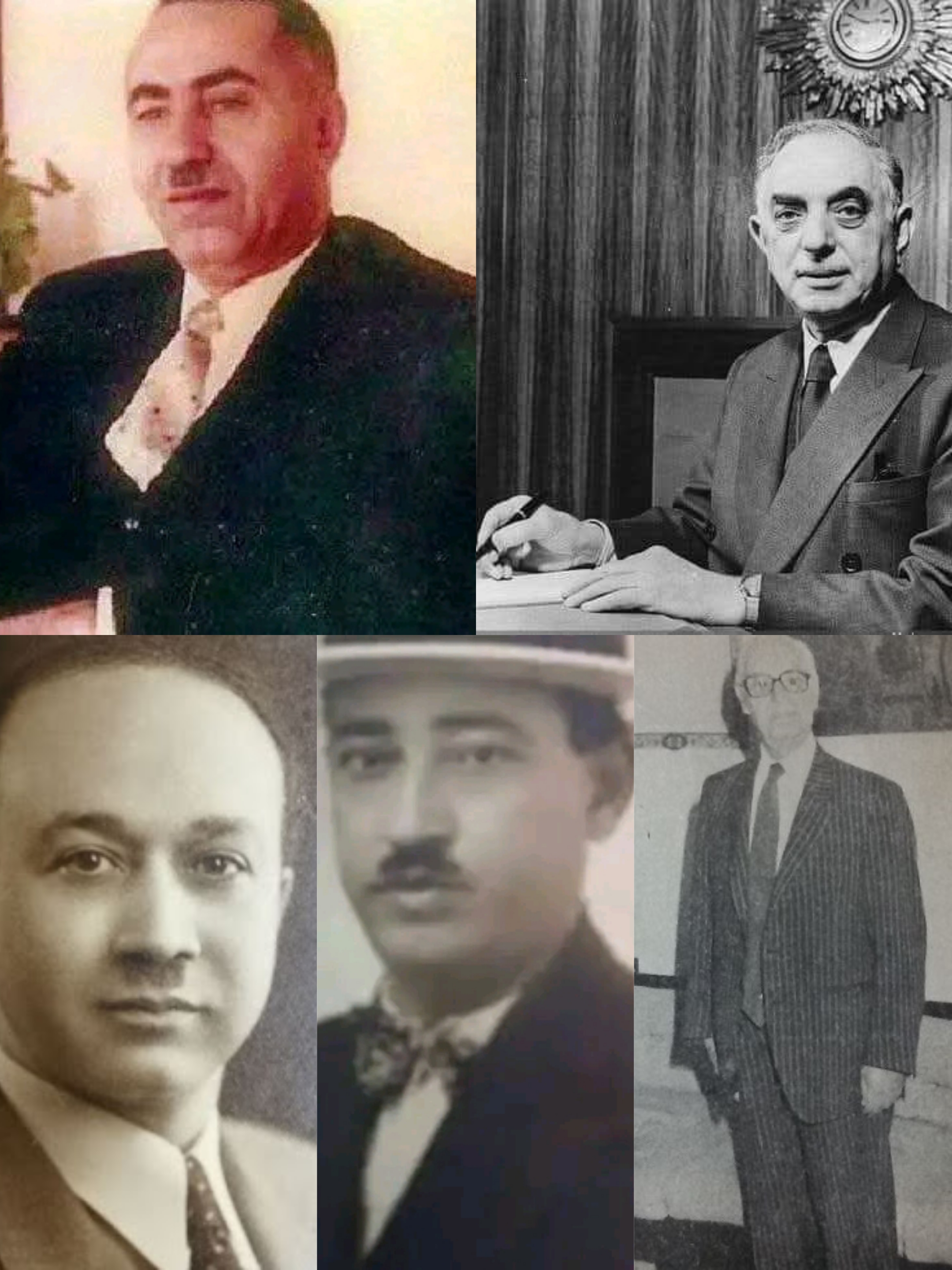
The main leaders of the party: Nuri al-Said (top left), Abd al-Wahab Murjan (top right), Khalil Kanna (bottom left), Shaker al-Wadi (bottom middle), and Jamil Abd al-Wahab (bottom right)

The Higher Commission elected members of the Central Committee, 15 members were elected including: Nuri al-Said, Abd al-Wahab Murjan, Shaker al-Wadi, Muhammad Ali Mahmoud, Mohammed Hassan Kubba, Jamil Abd al-Wahab, Abd al-Qadir Bash A'ayan, Jamil al-Orfali, Abd al-Majeed Abbas, Azzedine Mulla, Sa'ad Omar, Ahmed Al-Amir, Rasheed Al-Chalabi, Dia'a Ja'far and Khalil Kenah. The Central Committee elected Abd al-Wahab Murjan as vice president, Khalil Kenna as First Secretary, Ahmad al-Amer as Second Secretary, Jamil al-Urfa as Accountant and Mohammed Hassan Kabbah as Treasurer.

The party aimed to restrict crown prince Abd al-Ilah interventions in Iraqi politics, support Nuri Pasha in government formation, and resist left-wing parties.
