= Nuri al-Said =

Iraqi politician (1888–1958)

Nuri al-Said CH
- نوري السعيد
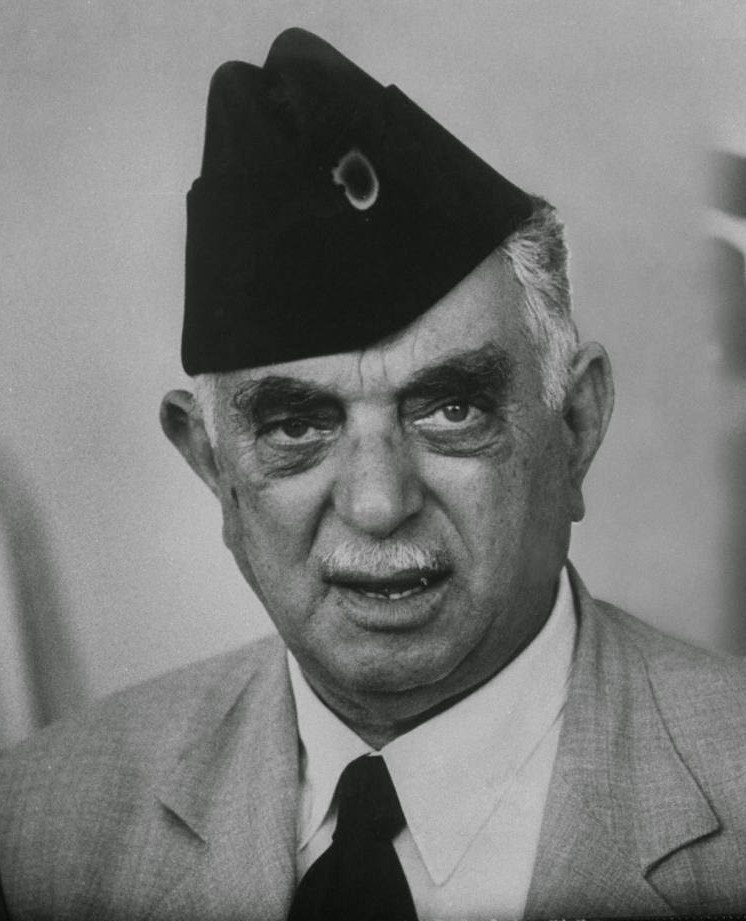
- Nuri al-Said in 1957

Prime Minister of Mandatory of Iraq Prime Minister of the Kingdom of Iraq
- In office 3 March 1958 – 18 May 1958
- Monarch: Faisal II
- Preceded by: Abdul-Wahab Mirjan
- Succeeded by: Ahmad Mukhtar Baban
- In office 4 August 1954 – 20 June 1957
- Monarch: Faisal II
- Preceded by: Arshad al-Umari
- Succeeded by: Ali Jawdat Al-Ayyubi
- In office 15 September 1950 – 12 July 1952
- Monarch: Faisal II
- Regent: Prince Abdullah
- Preceded by: Tawfiq al-Suwaidi
- Succeeded by: Mustafa Mahmud al-Umari
- In office 6 January 1949 – 10 December 1949
- Monarch: Faisal II
- Regent: Prince Abdullah
- Preceded by: Muzahim al-Pachachi
- Succeeded by: Ali Jawdat Al-Ayyubi
- In office 21 November 1946 – 29 March 1947
- Monarch: Faisal II
- Regent: Prince Abdullah
- Preceded by: Arshad al-Umari
- Succeeded by: Salih Jabr
- In office 10 October 1941 – 4 June 1944
- Monarch: Faisal II
- Regent: Prince Abdullah
- Preceded by: Jamil al-Midfai
- Succeeded by: Hamdi al-Pachachi
- In office 25 December 1938 – 31 March 1940
- Monarchs: Ghazi I Faisal II
- Regent: Prince Abdullah
- Preceded by: Jamil al-Midfai
- Succeeded by: Rashid Ali al-Gaylani
- In office 23 March 1930 – 3 November 1932
- Monarch: Faisal I
- Preceded by: Naji al-Suwaydi
- Succeeded by: Naji Shawkat

Personal details
- Born: Nuri Pasha al-Said; December 1888 Baghdad, Ottoman Iraq
- Died: 15 July 1958 (aged 69) Baghdad, Arab Federation
- Cause of death: Gunshot wounds
- Party: Covenant Party, Constitutional Union Party (Iraq)
- Spouse: Naima al-Said

Military service
- Allegiance: Ottoman Empire; Arab Revolt; Kingdom of Iraq
- Branch/service: Sixth Army; Sharifian Army; Iraqi Army
- Years of service: 1906–1922
- Rank: General
- Battles/wars: Italo-Turkish War; Balkan Wars; World War I; Arab Revolt

Nuri al-Said Al-Qaraghuli Al-Zubaidi (Arabic: نوري السعيد, romanized: Nūrī al-Saʿīd; December 1888 – 15 July 1958) was an Iraqi politician and statesman who served eight terms as Prime Minister of Iraq. He served in various key cabinet and governmental positions in Iraq during its British Mandate and post-independence Hashemite period.

From his first appointment as prime minister under the British Mandate in 1930, Nuri was a major political figure in Iraq under the monarchy. The 1930 Anglo-Iraqi Treaty granted Britain permanent military prerogatives in Iraq, but also paved the way for the country's nominal independence and entry as a member of the League of Nations in 1932. Nuri was forced to flee the country after the 1941 Iraqi coup d'état which brought a pro-Nazi government to power, but following a British-led intervention he was re-installed as prime minister.

During the early fifties, Nuri's government negotiated a fifty-fifty profit-sharing agreement on royalties with the Iraq Petroleum Company as oil began to play a significant role in the Iraqi economy. The agreement, along with the establishment of the Iraqi Development Board, provided for a series of ambitious schemes and projects to foster comprehensive economic growth in Iraq, and the private sector came to dominate the country's economic activity. However, the working conditions of the poor remained poorly addressed, which further contributed to the growth of anti-monarchist sentiment. The formation of the Baghdad Pact in 1955 exacerbated discontent in the country.

A controversial figure throughout most of his career, Nuri was deeply unpopular amongst several segments of Iraqi society by the end of 1950s. His political views, regarded as a blend of Iraqi nationalism, Conservatism, pro-Western sentiment, anti-communism, and anti-Nasserism, were believed by his detractors to have failed in adapting to the country's changed social circumstances. Under his rule, the historical Iraqi Jewish community fled in mass. A coup d'état took place in July 1958 and led to the overthrow of the Hashemite monarchy. Nuri attempted to flee the country but was captured and killed.

== Early career ==
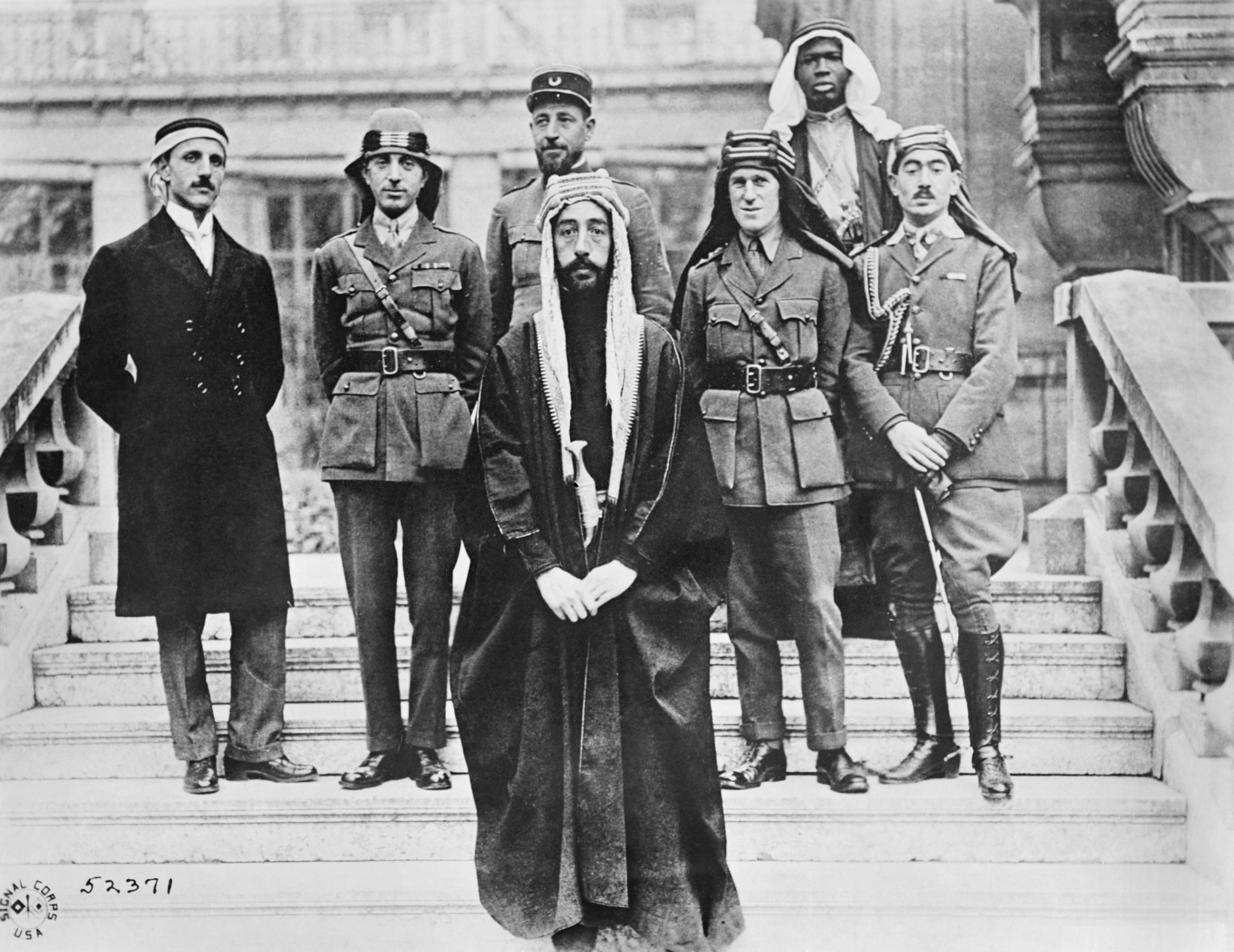
Emir Faisal's delegation at the Palace of Versailles during the Paris Peace Conference (1919–1920). Nuri is positioned second from the left. Left to right: Rustam Haidar, Nuri al-Said, Prince Faisal, Captain Rosario Pisani (behind Faisal), Colonel T. E. Lawrence, unnamed slave of Prince Faisal, Captain Tahsin Kadry.

Nuri Saeed Al-Qaraghuli Al-Zubaidi was born in Baghdad to a middle class family of Arab origins from the Qaraghouli tribe of Zubaid His father was a minor government accountant. Nuri graduated from the Ottoman Military College in Istanbul in 1906, trained at the staff college there in 1911 as an officer in the Ottoman Army and was among the officers dispatched to Ottoman Tripolitania in 1912 to resist the Italian occupation of that province. He was an elusive guerrilla leader, with Jaafar Al-Askari, against the British in Libya in 1915.

After being captured and held prisoner by the British in Egypt during World War I, he and Jaafar were converted to the Arab nationalist cause and fought in the Arab Revolt under Emir Faisal ibn Hussain of the Hejaz, who would later reign briefly as King of Arab Syria before he was installed as King of Iraq. On one operation Nuri rode with T. E. Lawrence and his British Army driver as crew of a Rolls-Royce Armoured Car.

Like other Iraqi officers who had served under Faisal, he went on to emerge as part of a new political elite.

== Political career ==
=== Initial positions under Iraqi monarchy ===
Nuri headed the Arab troops who took Damascus for Faisal in the wake of the retreating Ottoman forces in 1918. When Faisal was deposed by the French in 1920, Nuri followed the exiled monarch to Iraq, and in 1922 became first director general of the Iraqi police force. He used the position to fill the force with his placemen, a tactic that he would repeat in subsequent positions; that was a basis of his considerable political clout in later years.

He was a trusted ally of Faisal who, in 1924, appointed him deputy commander in chief of the army so as to ensure the loyalty of the troops to the regime. Once again, Nuri used the position to build up his own power base. During the 1920s, he supported the king's policy to build up the nascent state's armed forces, based on the loyalty of Sharifian officers, the former Ottoman soldiers who formed the backbone of the regime.

=== Prime Minister for first time ===
Faisal first proposed Nuri as prime minister in 1929, but it was only in 1930 that the British were persuaded to forgo their objections. As in previous appointments, Nuri was quick to appoint supporters to key government positions, but that only weakened the king's own base among the civil service, and the formerly close relationship between the two men soured. Among Nuri's first acts as prime minister was the signing of the Anglo-Iraqi Treaty of 1930, an unpopular move since it essentially confirmed Britain's mandatory powers and gave them permanent military prerogatives in the country even after full independence was achieved. In 1932, he presented the Iraqi case for greater independence to the League of Nations.

In October 1932, Faisal dismissed Nuri as Prime Minister and replaced him with Naji Shawkat, which curbed Nuri's influence somewhat; after the death of Faisal the following year and the accession of Ghazi, his access to the palace decreased. Further impeding his influence was the rise of Yasin al-Hashimi, who would become prime minister for the first time in 1935. Nevertheless, Nuri continued to hold sway among the military establishment, and his position as a trusted ally of the British meant that he was never far from power. In 1933, the British persuaded Ghazi to appoint him foreign minister, a post he held until the Bakr Sidqi coup in 1936. As foreign minister, he emphasized Arab unity and tried to mediate regarding the Peel Commission between the British government and Zionist leader Chaim Weizmann in 1936. However, his close ties to the British, which helped him remain in important positions of state, also destroyed any remaining popularity.

=== Intriguing with army ===
The Bakr Sidqi coup showed the extent to which Nuri had tied his fate to that of the British in Iraq: he was the only politician of the toppled government to seek refuge in the British Embassy, and his hosts sent him into exile in Egypt. He returned to Baghdad in August 1937 and began plotting his return to power in collaboration with Colonel Salah al-Din al-Sabbagh. That so perturbed Prime Minister Jamil al-Midfai that he persuaded the British that Nuri was a disruptive influence who would be better off abroad. They obliged by convincing Nuri to take up residence in London as the Iraqi ambassador. Despairing perhaps of his relationship with Ghazi, he now began to secretly suggest co-operation with the House of Saud.

Back in Baghdad in October 1938, Nuri re-established contact with al-Sabbagh and persuaded him to overthrow the Midfai government. Al-Sabbagh and his cohorts launched their coup on 24 December 1938, and Nuri was reinstated as prime minister. He sought to sideline the king by promoting the position and possible succession of the latter's half-brother Prince Zaid. Simultaneously, the British were irritated by Ghazi's increasingly nationalistic broadcasts on his private radio station. In January 1939, the king further aggrieved Nuri by appointing Rashid Ali al-Gaylani head of the Royal Divan. Nuri's campaign against his rivals continued in March of that year when he claimed to have unmasked a plot to murder Ghazi and used it as an excuse to carry out a purge of the army's officer corps.

When Ghazi died in a car crash on 4 April 1939, Nuri was widely suspected of being implicated in his death. At the royal funeral, crowds chanted, "You will answer for the blood of Ghazi, Nuri". He supported the accession of 'Abd al-Ilah as regent for Ghazi's successor, Faisal II, who was still a minor. The new regent was initially susceptible to Nuri's influence.

On 1 September 1939, Germany invaded Poland. Soon, Germany and Britain were at war. In accordance with Article 4 of the Anglo-Iraqi Treaty, Iraq was committed to declaring war on Germany. Instead, in an effort to maintain a neutral position, Nuri announced that Iraqi armed forces would not be employed outside of Iraq. While German officials were deported, Iraq would not declare war.

By then, affairs in Europe had begun to affect Iraq; the Battle of France in June 1940 encouraged some Arab nationalist elements to seek, in the style of the United States and Turkey, to move toward neutrality toward Germany and Italy rather than being part of the British war effort. While Nuri generally was more pro-British, al-Sabbagh moved into the camp more positively oriented toward Germany. The loss of his main military ally meant that Nuri "quickly lost his ability to affect events".

=== Co-existence with regent in the 1940s ===
In April 1941, the pro-neutrality elements seized power, installing Rashid Ali al-Kaylani as prime minister. Nuri fled to British-controlled Transjordan; his protectors then sent him to Cairo, but after occupying Baghdad they brought him back, installing him as prime minister under the British occupation. He would retain the post for over two and half years, but from 1943 onward, the regent obtained a greater say in the selection of his ministers and began to assert greater independence. Iraq remained under British military occupation until late 1947. He served as the President of the Senate of Iraq from July 1945 to November 1946, and from 1948 to January 1949.

The regent's brief flirtation with more liberal policies in 1947 did little to stave off the problems that the established order was facing. The social and economic structures of the country had changed considerably since the establishment of the monarchy, with an increased urban population, a rapidly growing middle class, and increasing political consciousness among the peasants and the working class, in which the Iraqi Communist Party was playing a growing role. However, the political elite, with its strong ties and shared interests with the dominant classes, was unable to take the radical steps that might have preserved the monarchy. The attempt by the elite to retain power during the last ten years of the monarchy, Nuri rather than the regent would increasingly play the dominant role, thanks largely to his superior political skills.

=== Regime resists growing political unrest ===
In November 1946, an oil workers' strike culminated in a massacre of the strikers by the police, and Nuri was brought back as premier. He briefly brought the Liberals and National Democrats into the cabinet, but soon reverted to the more repressive approach he generally favoured, ordering the arrest of numerous communists in January 1947. Those captured included party secretary Fahd. Meanwhile, Britain attempted to legalise a permanent military presence in Iraq even beyond the terms of the 1930 treaty although it no longer had World War II to justify its continued presence there. Both Nuri and the regent increasingly saw their unpopular links with Great Britain as the best guarantee of their own position, and accordingly set about co-operating in the creation of a new Anglo-Iraqi Treaty. In early January 1948 Nuri himself joined the negotiating delegation in England, and on 15 January the treaty was signed.

The response on the streets of Baghdad was immediate and furious. After six years of British occupation, no single act could have been less popular than giving the British an even larger legal role in Iraq's affairs. Demonstrations broke out the following day, with students playing a prominent part and the Communist Party guiding much of the anti-government activity. The protests intensified over the following days, until the police fired on a mass demonstration (20 January), leaving many casualties. On the following days, 'Abd al-Ilah disavowed the new treaty. Nuri returned to Baghdad on 26 January and immediately implemented a harsh policy of repression against the protesters. At mass demonstration the next day, police fired again at the protesters, leaving many more dead. In his struggle to implement the treaty, Nuri had destroyed any credibility that he had left. He retained considerable power throughout the country, but he was generally hated.

Nuri’s government was determined to drive the Jews out of his country as quickly as possible and strip them of their nationality. On 21 August 1950, he threatened to revoke the license of the company transporting the Jewish exodus if it did not fulfill its daily quota of 500 Jews. On 18 September 1950, Nuri summoned a representative of the Jewish community, claimed Israel was behind the emigration delay and threatened to "take them to the borders" and expel the Jews.

In 1950, Nuri Al-Said turned to building up Iraq's internal strength by concentrating on economic development. He replaced the Anglo-Iraqi Treaty (1948) with a new oil agreement with the Iraq Petroleum Company on the basis of 50/50 profit sharing, which increased the amount of funds available for development. This allowed for the establishment of the Development Board for reconstruction which launched a series of ambitious schemes and projects to foster comprehensive growth in Iraq. Private capital invested in industry amounted to about ID 4 million in 1953, rising to nearly ID 20 million by 1956, although the working conditions of the poor had hardly been assessed, which led to reprimand by the ever-growing anti-monarchist sentiment in Iraq.

In August 1954, Nuri al-Said went back to power, forcing the Regent to dissolve the parliament. This was a major breakdown of constitutional and liberal traditions in Iraq. Furthermore, he implemented a series of laws against full citizenship. For example, the communists lost their nationalities. Thanks to this move, he was able to control the institution and to set up a new foreign policy in favor of the West.

The next major political demarche with which Nuri's name would be associated was the Baghdad Pact, a series of agreements concluded between 1954 and 1955, which tied Iraq politically and militarily with the Western powers and their regional allies, notably Turkey. The pact was especially important to Nuri, as it was favoured by the British and Americans. On the other hand, it was also contrary to the political aspirations of most of the country. Taking advantage of the situation, Nuri stepped up his policies of political repression and censorship.

The political situation deteriorated in 1956, when Israel, France and Britain colluded in an invasion of Egypt, in response to the nationalisation of the Suez Canal by President Gamal Abdel Nasser. Nuri was overjoyed with the tripartite move and instructed the radio station to play The Postmen Complained about the Abundance of My Letters as a way to mock Nasser, whose father was a postal clerk. However, Nuri then publicly condemned the invasion, as the national sentiment was strongly for Egypt. The invasion exacerbated popular mistrust of the Baghdad Pact, and Nuri responded by refusing to sit with British representatives during a meeting of the Pact and cut off diplomatic relations with France. According to historian Adeeb Dawish, "Nuri's circumspect response hardly placated the seething populace."

Mass protests and disturbances occurred throughout the country, in Baghdad, Basrah, Mosul, Kufa, Najaf and al-Hillah. In response Nuri decreed martial law and sent in troops to some southern cities to suppress the riots, while in Baghdad, nearly 400 protesters were detained. Nuri's political position was weakened, so much that he became more "discouraged and depressed" than ever before (according to the British ambassador) and was genuinely fearful that he would be unable to restore stability. Meanwhile, the opposition began to co-ordinate its activities: in February 1957, a Front of National Union was established, bringing together the National Democrats, the Independents, the Communists, and the Ba'th Party. A similar process within the military officer corps followed, with the formation of the Supreme Committee of Free Officers. However, Nuri's attempts to preserve the loyalty of the military by generous benefits failed.

The Iraqi monarchy and its Hashemite ally in Jordan reacted to the union between Egypt and Syria (February 1958) by forming the Arab Federation of Iraq and Jordan. (Kuwait was asked to enter the union; however, the British opposed this.) Nuri was the first prime minister of the new federation, which was soon ended with the coup that toppled the Iraqi monarchy.

== Death ==
=== 14 July Revolution ===
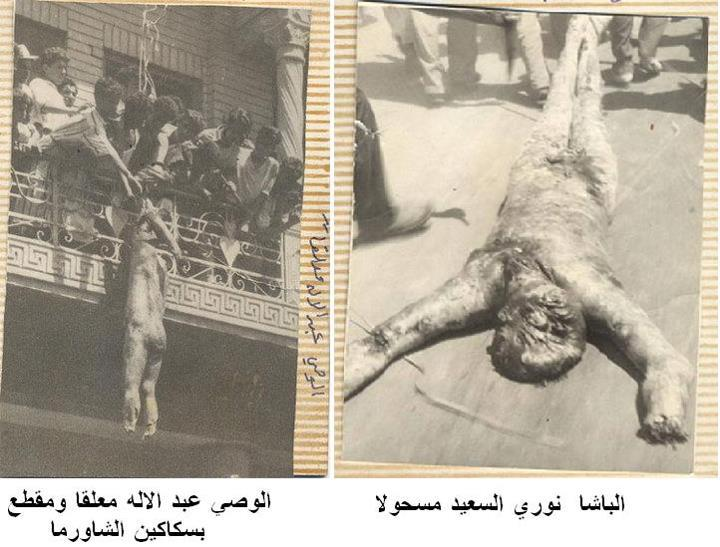
Corpse of Nuri (right), and regent Abd al-Ilah (left) lynched by the crowds.

As the 1958 Lebanon crisis escalated, Jordan requested the help of Iraqi troops, who feigned to be en route there on 14 July. Instead, they moved on to Baghdad, and on that day, Brigadier Abd al-Karim Qasim and Colonel Abdul Salam Arif seized control of the country and ordered the Royal Family to evacuate the Rihab Palace in Baghdad. They congregated in the courtyard—King Faisal II; Prince 'Abd al-Ilah and his wife Princess Hiyam; Princess Nafeesa, Abdul Ilah's mother; Princess Abadiya, the king's aunt; and several servants. The group was ordered to turn facing the wall and were shot down by Captain Abdus-Sattar as-Sab, a member of the coup. After almost four decades, the monarchy had been toppled.

Nuri went into hiding, but he was captured the next day as he sought to make his escape. He was shot dead and buried that same day, but an angry mob disinterred his corpse and dragged it through the streets of Baghdad, where it was hung up, burned and mutilated, ultimately being run over repeatedly by municipal buses, until his corpse was unrecognizable.

== Personal life and family ==
Nuri and his wife had one son, Sabah As-Said, who married an Egyptian heiress, Esmat Ali Pasha Fahmi in 1936. They had two sons: Falah (born 1937) and Issam (born 1938). Sabah As-Said is supposed to have taken an Iraqi-Jewish woman as a second wife and had a child with her when Jews accounted for 25-40% of Baghdad's population. After being ousted from Iraq, both his second wife and child fled to Israel.

Falah, who worked as King Hussein's personal pilot, was first married to Nahla El-Askari and had one son, Sabah. He later married Dina Fawaz Maher in 1974, the daughter of a Jordanian army general, Fawaz Pasha Maher, and had two daughters: Sima and Zaina.

Falah died in a car accident in Jordan in 1983. Issam was an artist and architect based in London who died in 1988 from a heart attack.

== See also ==
- Kinahan Cornwallis – British Ambassador to Iraq
- Fritz Grobba – German Ambassador to Iraq

== Sources ==
- Batatu, Hanna (1978). The Old Social Classes and the Revolutionary Movements of Iraq: A Study of Iraq's Old Landed and Commercial Classes and of Its Communists, Ba'thists and Free Officers (PDF). Princeton University Press.
- Birdwood, Lord (1959). Nuri as-Said: A Study in Arab Leadership. Cassell.
- Chalak, Zouheir (1989). Min Awraq al-Intidab: Tarikh Ma Aghfalahu al-Tarikh [From the Papers of the Mandate: History That History Overlooked]. Beirut: Dar al-Nafais. LCCN 90962841.
- Dawisha, Adeed (2011). Iraq: A Political History from Independence to Occupation. Princeton University Press.
- Eppel, Michael (1994). The Palestine Conflict in the History of Modern Iraq: The Dynamics of Involvement 1928-1948. Frank Cass.
- Eppel, Michael (1992). "Iraqi politics and regional policies, 1945–49". Middle Eastern Studies. 28 (1): 108–119. doi:10.1080/00263209208700892. ISSN 0026-3206.
- Franzén, Johan (2009). "Development vs. Reform: Attempts at Modernisation During the Twilight of British Influence in Iraq, 1946–58". The Journal of Imperial and Commonwealth History. 37 (1): 77–98. doi:10.1080/03086530902757712. ISSN 0308-6534.
- Gallman, Waldemar J. (1964). Iraq Under General Nuri: My Recollections of Nuri Al-Said, 1954-1958. Johns Hopkins Press.
- Gat, Moshe (2026). "Nuri al-Said and the Modern Odyssey of Iraqi Jewry". The Journal of the Middle East and Africa. 17 (1): 21–38. doi:10.1080/21520844.2025.2600755. ISSN 2152-0844.
- Gomaa, Ahmed M. (1977). The Foundation of the League of Arab States: Wartime Diplomacy and Inter-Arab Politics 1941 to 1945. Longman Group.
- İpek, Fatih Oğuzhan; Kardaş, Tuncay (2026). "Rethinking Iraq's Decision to Join the Baghdad Pact". Digest of Middle East Studies. 35 (3). doi:10.1111/dome.70034. ISSN 1060-4367.
- Khadduri, Majid (2000). "Nuri Al-Sa'id's Disenchantment with Britain in His Last Years". Middle East Journal. 54 (1): 83–96. ISSN 0026-3141. JSTOR 4329433.
- Khadduri, Majid (1962). "General Nūrī's Flirtations with the Axis Powers". Middle East Journal. 16 (3): 328–336. ISSN 0026-3141. JSTOR 4323496.
- Lord, Birdwood (1959). Nuri As-Said: A Study in Arab Leadership. Cassell & Company Limited.
- Lukitz, Liora (1995). Iraq: The Search for National Identity. Frank Cass.
- Rey, Matthieu (2022). When Parliaments Ruled the Middle East: Iraq and Syria, 1946–63. American University in Cairo Press.
- Saad, Abubaker M. (1987). Iraq and Arab Politics: the Nuri as-Said Era, 1941-1958 (Thesis). University of Washington.
- Silverfarb, David (1986). Britain's Informal Empire in the Middle East: A Case Study of Iraq 1929-1941. Oxford University Press.
- Simons, Geoff (1993). Iraq: From Sumer To Saddam. Springer.
- Simon, Reeva (2004). Iraq Between the Two World Wars: The Militarist Origins of Tyranny. Columbia University Press.
- Shikārah, Aḥmad ʻAbd al-Razzāq (1987). Iraqi Politics, 1921-41: The Interaction Between Domestic Politics and Foreign Policy. LAAM.
- Tripp, Charles (2002). A History of Iraq. Cambridge University Press.
- Porath, Yehoshua (October 1984). "Nuri al‐Sa'id's Arab unity programme". Middle Eastern Studies. 20 (4): 76–98. doi:10.1080/00263208408700600. JSTOR 4283031.

Political offices
Preceded by Naji al-Suwaidi	Prime Minister of Iraq; 23 March 1930 – 19 October 1932	Succeeded by Naji Shawkat
Preceded by Jamil al-Midfai	Prime Minister of Iraq; 25 December 1938 – 31 March 1940	Succeeded by Rashid Ali al-Gaylani
Preceded by Jamil al-Midfai	Prime Minister of Iraq; 10 October 1941 – 4 June 1944	Succeeded by Hamdi al-Pachachi
Preceded by Arshad al-Umari	Prime Minister of Iraq; 21 November 1946 – 29 March 1947	Succeeded by Sayid Salih Jabr
Preceded by Muzahim al-Pachachi	Prime Minister of Iraq; 6 January 1949 – 10 December 1949	Succeeded by Ali Jawdat al-Aiyubi
Preceded by Tawfiq al-Suwaidi	Prime Minister of Iraq; 15 September 1950 – 12 July 1952	Succeeded by Mustafa Mahmud al-Umari
Preceded by Arshad al-Umari	Prime Minister of Iraq; 4 August 1954 – 20 June 1957	Succeeded by Ali Jawdat al-Aiyubi
Preceded by Abdul-Wahab Mirjan	Prime Minister of Iraq; 3 March 1958 – 18 May 1958	Succeeded by Ahmad Mukhtar Baban
