= List of international trips made by Saddam Hussein =

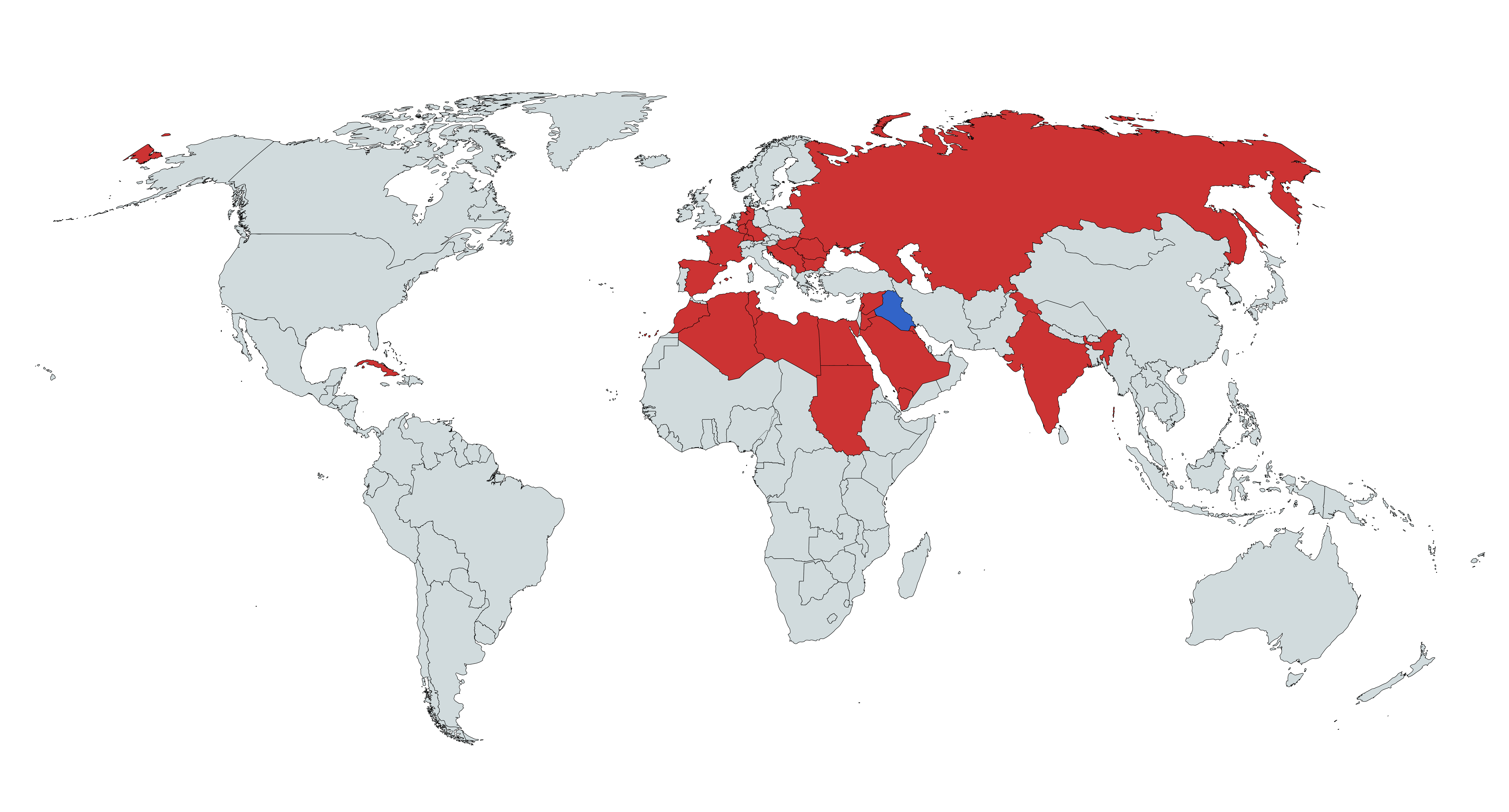
Foreign visits by Saddam Hussein

This is a list of international trips made by Saddam Hussein, the former vice president and president of Iraq, from 1968 until his overthrow in the 2003 invasion of Iraq. As vice president, he made state visits to numerous countries and represented Iraq at several events. Following his accession to the seat of presidency and coinciding the Iran–Iraq War, Saddam attended various Arab League summits and global conferences. After the Gulf War, Saddam reduced his foreign visits, due to security reasons and post-war impact.

== Summary ==
The number of visits per country where Saddam Hussein traveled are:

- One visit to Bulgaria, East Germany, Egypt, Hungary, Lebanon, North Yemen, Romania, Spain, Sudan and Yugoslavia
- Two visits to Algeria, Iran, Jordan, Kuwait, Syria, Libya, Yemen, Iran and Tunisia
- Three visits to Cuba
- Four visits to France and Saudi Arabia
- Six visits to Morocco
- Eight visits to the Soviet Union

== 1960s ==
=== 1969 ===
	Dates	Country	Areas visited	Details
1		Soviet Union	Moscow	First meeting with Yevgeny Primakov
2		Libya	Benghazi	Diplomatic visit, met with Muammar Gaddafi
3	21–23 December 1969	Morocco	Rabat	Attended the Arab League Summit in Rabat

== 1970s ==
=== 1970 ===
	Dates	Country	Areas visited	Details	Image
4	21 March 1971	Lebanon	Beirut	Attended a secret meeting along with his wife Sajida Talfah, of the Ba'ath Party leadership including Michel Aflaq and Salah al-Din al-Bitar. Dignitaries were Assistant General Secretary Shibli al-Ayssami, Iraqi president Ahmad Hasan al-Bakr and others	
		Soviet Union			

=== 1971 ===
	Dates	Country	Areas visited	Details
5	21 March 1971	Syria	Damascus	Met with Hafez al-Assad on King Hussein's plan of Arab Federation. Dignitaries were Hafez al-Assad, Mahmoud al-Ayyubi, Mustafa Tlass, Murtada al-Hadithi, and Saadoun Ghaidan.
6	November 1971	Soviet Union	Moscow	First visit to the Soviet Union, met with Soviet leader Leonid Brezhnev and Soviet Premier Alexei Kosygin. Delegation included Alexei Kosygin, Abdul Khaliq al-Samarra'i, Abdul Karim al-Shaikhly, and Muhammad Fadhil

=== 1972 ===
	Dates	Country	Areas visited	Details
7	24 February 1972	Soviet Union	Moscow	Diplomatic visit, significantly visited the grave of Joseph Stalin
8	27 March 1972	Egypt	Cairo	Proposal for Union of Arab Republics instead of King Hussein's plan of King Hussein's federation plan and discussed about Iraqi support for Syria and Egypt in the Yom Kippur War against Israel
9	19–21 June 1972	France	Paris	First visit to France

=== 1973 ===
	Dates	Country	Areas visited	Details
10	24 March 1973	Soviet Union	Moscow	Visited Moscow.
	13–15 May 1973	Afghanistan	Kabul	Attended Non-Aligned Standing Committee Conference.

=== 1974 ===
	Dates	Country	Areas visited	Details
10	14 March 1974	Soviet Union	Moscow	Visited Moscow at the invitation of the CC CPSU and the Soviet government.
11	25–28 Mar 1974	India	New Delhi	Diplomatic visit
12	June 1974	Algeria	Algiers	State visit
13	27 October 1974	Morocco	Rabat	Attended Arab League summit
14	October 1974	United Arab Emirates	Abu Dhabi, Dubai	Diplomatic visit
15	November 1974	Saudi Arabia	Riyadh	Diplomatic visit, held talks with King Faisal and Crown Prince Fahd.
16	10–12 December 1974	Spain	Granada, Toledo, Cordoba, Madrid	Caudillo of Spain, Francisco Franco, invited Saddam to Madrid and visited Granada, Córdoba and Toledo.

=== 1975 ===
	Dates	Country	Areas visited	Details	Image
17	11 February 1975	Kuwait	Kuwait City	Diplomatic visit	
18	3–5 March 1975	France	Paris	Notably had a lunch at Hotel Matignon during his meeting with the French Prime minister Jacques Chirac.	
19	6 March 1975	Algeria	Algiers	Attended OPEC summit and signed peace agreement with Mohammad Reza Pahlavi.	
		Mauritania	Nouakchott		
20	11 March 1975	Tunisia	Tunis	Diplomatic visit	
	26 March 1975	Saudi Arabia	Riyadh	Attending funeral of King Faisal	
21	14-15 April 1975	Soviet Union	Moscow	Diplomatic visit	
22	29 April 1975	Iran	Tehran	First diplomatic visit to Iran	
23		Libya	Tripoli	Diplomatic visit	
24	5 May 1975	Bulgaria	Sofia	Diplomatic visit	
25	5—7 May 1975	Romania	Bucharest	Three-day Diplomatic visit	
26	7–9 May 1975	Hungary	Budapest	Two-day diplomatic visit	
27	12 May 1975	East Germany	East Berlin	Diplomatic visit	
28	6–8 September 1975	France	Paris	Visit to nuclear sites and signed agreement with France on building nuclear sites in Iraq	
	20–23 November 1975	Spain	Madrid	Attended funeral of Francisco Franco	

=== 1976 ===
	Dates	Country	Areas visited	Details	Image
29	3 January 1976	Iran	Mashhad	Visited and prayed at the Imam Reza Shrine in Mashhad	
30	19 April 1975	Kuwait	Kuwait City	Diplomatic visit	
	25 October 1975	Egypt	Cairo	Attended Arab League summit	
31	13 December 1976	Soviet Union	Moscow	Diplomatic visit, held talks with Prime Minister Alexei Kosygin and other Soviet officials	
32	16 December 1976	Algeria	Algiers	Diplomatic visit	
		France		Diplomatic visit	

=== 1977 ===
	Dates	Country	Areas visited	Details
33	1–15 February 1977	Soviet Union	Moscow	Fifth visit to the Soviet Union, held talks with Alexei Kosygin on bilateral relations
34	13 August 1977	Kuwait	Kuwait City	Diplomatic visit
	2 December 1977	Libya	Tripoli	Attended a summit with the participation of the leaders of Algeria, Iraq, Libya, the PLO and South Yemen to discuss Sadat's initiative
35	13 December 1977	France	Paris	Signed agreement under which Iraq purchased approximately 80 French Mirage aircraft

=== 1978 ===
	Dates	Country	Areas visited	Details
36	October 1978	Cuba	Havana	Diplomatic visit, included tours of cement and textile factories, and the signing of bilateral agreements
37	11–13 December 1978	Soviet Union	Moscow	Diplomatic visit, held talks with Alexei Kosygin
	29 December 1978	Algeria	Algiers	Attended funeral of Houari Boumédiène

=== 1979 ===
	Dates	Country	Areas visited	Details	Image
38	30 January 1979	Syria	Damascus	Unification talks between Syria and Iraq	
		Jordan			
39	23 November 1979	Algeria	Algiers	Diplomatic visit and visiting the grave of Houari Boumédiène	
40	3–9 September 1979	Cuba	Havana	Attended and briefly addressed the 6th Non-aligned Summit Meeting in Havana	
41	20 November 1979	Tunisia	Tunis	Attended the Arab League summit	

== 1980s ==
=== 1980 ===
	Dates	Country	Areas visited	Details	Image
42	8 May 1980	Yugoslavia	Belgrade	Attended the state funeral of Josip Broz Tito along with Sa'dun Hammadi, King Carl XVI Gustaf, Ola Ullsten, Patrick Hillery and Bruno Kreisky	
43	5 August 1980	Saudi Arabia	Riyadh	Secured Saudi support for the Iraqi invasion of Iran and first presidential diplomatic visit to Saudi Arabia	
44	25-27 November 1980	Jordan	Amman	Attended Arab League summit in Amman, mainly focused on the Iran–Iraq War	

=== 1981 ===
	Dates	Country	Areas visited	Details
45	7–9 August 1981	Saudi Arabia	Taif, Mecca	Attended Islamic conference at Taif and Mecca, focusing on the Iran–Iraq War and the Saddam briefly addressed the summit
46	25 November 1981	Morocco	Fez	Convened on 25 November 1981, but was suspended and later resumed in 1981

=== 1982 ===
	Dates	Country	Areas visited	Details	Image
	13 June 1982	Saudi Arabia	Mecca	Attended the funeral of King Khalid	
47	6–9 September 1982	Morocco	Fez	Attended the Arab League summit in Fez, focusing on King Fahd's peace plan between Israel and Palestine and the prolonging Iran–Iraq War	

=== 1983 ===
	Dates	Country	Areas visited	Details
48	7–12 March 1983	India	New Delhi	Attended the 7th Summit of the Non-Aligned Movement and survived an assassination attempt by the Islamic Dawa Party as per local sources. Dignitaries included Indira Gandhi, Zia-ul-Haq, and Yasser Arafat.

=== 1984 ===
	Dates	Country	Areas visited	Details
49	7–9 August 1984	Oman	Muscat	Diplomatic visit and held talks with Sultan Qaboos bin Said in Muscat on Iran–Iraq War.

=== 1985 ===
	Dates	Country	Areas visited	Details
	13 March 1985	Soviet Union	Moscow	Attended funeral of Konstantin Chernenko
50	7–9 August 1985	Morocco	Casablanca	Attended the Arab League Extraordinary summit on Jordanian-Palestinian peace initiative.
51	15–17 December 1985	Soviet Union	Moscow	Diplomatic visit

=== 1986 ===
	Dates	Country	Areas visited	Details
52		Oman	Muscat	Diplomatic visit
53	15 November 1986	Soviet Union	Moscow	Held negotiations with Eduard Shevardnadze.
54	Unknown	Saudi Arabia	Medina	
55		France		Diplomatic visit

=== 1987 ===
	Dates	Country	Areas visited	Details	Image
56	Unknown	Saudi Arabia		Diplomatic visit.	
	4 May	Jordan	Al-Jafr	Held talks with Syrian president Hafez al-Assad, to mediate Iraq-Syria conflict.	
57	8–11 November 1987	Jordan	Amman	Attended the 16th Arab League Summit in Amman, Jordan	

=== 1988 ===
	Dates	Country	Areas visited	Details	Image
58	23-26 May 1988	Saudi Arabia	Mecca, Medina	Performed Umrah and pilgrimage (Hajj) in Mecca and Medina	
59	7–9 June 1988	Algeria	Algiers	Attended the Arab League summit	
	24 July 1988	Saudi Arabia	Riyadh	Diplomatic visit	
60	28 November 1988	Egypt	Cairo	First visit to Egypt since assuming the presidency.	

=== 1989 ===
	Dates	Country	Areas visited	Details	Image
59	23-26 May 1989	Morocco	Casablanca	Attended the Extraordinary Arab League summit in Casablanca.	
60	25 September 1989	North Yemen	Sanaa	Arab Cooperation Council meeting	
	9 November 1989	Vietnam			
		Jordan			
61	December 1989	Egypt	Alexandria	2nd round of Arab Cooperation Council meeting in Alexandria	

== 1990s ==
=== 1990 ===
	Dates	Country	Areas visited	Details	Image
62	27 March 1990	Saudi Arabia	Hafar al-Batin, Riyadh	Diplomatic visit, held with talks with King Fahd	
63	April 1990	Jordan	Amman	Diplomatic visit, held talks with King Hussein bin Talal.	
64	17 June 1990	Yemen	Sanaa	Diplomatic visit, met with Ali Abdullah Saleh	
65	4 October 1990	(Ba'athist Iraq) Kuwait	Iraqi-occupied Kuwait	Observed his troops in the country following the Iraqi invasion of Kuwait.	

== 2000s ==
=== 2000 ===
	Dates	Country	Areas visited	Details
66	September 2000	Venezuela	Caracas	Talks with Iranian government, to reaffirm the 1975 agreement.

=== 2001 ===
	Dates	Country	Areas visited	Details
67	2001	Cuba	Havana	Visit to Cuban doctor Dr. Alvarez Cambra

== See also ==
- Saddam Hussein
- Foreign relations of Iraq
