= Musa al-Shabandar =

Iraqi Statesman

- موسى الشابندر

Minister of Foreign Affairs
- In office 13 April 1941 – 29 May 1941
- Monarch: King Faisal II
- Prime Minister: Rashid Ali al-Gaylani
- Preceded by: Tawfiq al-Suwaidi
- Succeeded by: Ali Jawdat al-Aiyubi

Minister of Foreign Affairs
- In office 8 March 1954 – 29 April 1954
- Prime Minister: Muhammad Fadhel al-Jamali
- Preceded by: Muhammad Fadhel al-Jamali
- Succeeded by: Abdullah Bakr

Personal details
- Born: 1897
- Died: 1967 (aged 69–70)
- Occupation: Diplomat; Politician

Musa Mahmoud al-Shabandar (Arabic: موسى الشابندر) was an Iraqi politician who held various positions in Iraqi governments during the Kingdom of Iraq period, including serving as Minister of Foreign Affairs several times between 1941 and 1955. He's also the founder of what would become the Shabandar Coffeehouse.

== Early life ==
Musa al-Shabandar was born in the Jadid Hassan Pasha locality in Baghdad, located near al-Ma'mun Street and a locality of merchants and respected Baghdadi nobles. His father was Mahmoud al-Shabandar, a wealthy Baghdadi land and property owner. Musa was the al-Shabandar family's eldest son and played games with his siblings, including his younger brother Ibrahim al-Shabandar. Musa used to occupy his father to coffeehouses and he would listen to conversations in the coffeehouse. He would attend several schools and learn the Quran, several languages, and history at a young age under several Baghdadi scholars.

Al-Shabandar spoke English, French, and German and would soon move to Berlin in the Weimer Republic after the Armistice of 11 November 1918 was signed. He would move back to Baghdad in 1932 where he was appointed in the Iraqi delegation in the League of Nations.

== Political career ==
On 10 October 1933, al-Shabandar was appointed as the consul of Switzerland by the Iraqi government. In 1937, al-Shabandar was accused of giving certificates of export to Iraq for munitions meant to reach Spain. As a result, he was recalled and put under house arrest. Although the proceedings against him were dropped he became the deputy for Amarah until 1939.

After Rashid Ali al-Gaylani took over the Iraqi government during the 1941 Iraqi Golden Square coup d'état, al-Shabandar became the foreign minister. Al-Shabandar stood out from the rest of al-Gaylani's government for being the only part of the ruling class and a wealthy landowner, owning property in Berlin, while the rest were in the middle class. Al-Shabandar would later recount in his memoirs that a majority of Arabs at the time had sympathy towards Nazi Germany due to frustrations with imperialism and Zionism. The issues of various Arab states, as well as Nazi propaganda, played a big effect on Iraqis' sympathy. Al-Shabandar was a supporter of al-Gaylani but on 29 May, he would flee to Tehran along with many Iraqi officials after al-Gaylani's government fell.

Al-Shabandar was later caught in Rhodesia and was sent back to Iraq to stand trail where he was sentenced to four years in prison in 1944. Al-Shabandar's sentence lasted until 1947, and in 1949, he would become a member of Nuri al-Said's Constitutional Union Party. Al-Said would also appoint al-Shabandar as the ambassador to Damascus during the presidency of Syrian military officer Husni al-Za'im in order to further develop Syrian-Iraqi relations.

Al-Shabandar returned to occupy the position of Minister of Foreign Affairs in the government of Muhammad Fadhel al-Jamali for a short period from March 8, 1954, until April 29, 1954. He also held the same position for a longer period from August 3, 1954, until May 8, 1955, in the government of Nuri al-Said.

== Bibliography ==
- Al-Shabandar, Musa (1993). Baghdadi Memories: Iraq between occupation and independence. Riad al-Rayes Books and Publishing.
