= Foreign Office (disambiguation) =

Foreign Office may refer to:

- Foreign and Commonwealth Office, a department of the United Kingdom Government commonly called "Foreign Office"
- Foreign Office (Germany)
- United States Department of State
- Ministry of Foreign Affairs (Iran), an Iranian government ministry headed by the Minister of Foreign Affairs, who is a member of cabinet.
- Ministry of Foreign Affairs (Iraq)

== See also ==
- Ministry of Foreign Affairs
