= Subhi Abdul Hamid =

62nd Iraqi Minister of Foreign Affairs

Subhi Abdul Hamid (Arabic: صبحي عبد الحميد; January 31, 1924 in Baghdad – January 14, 2010) was Iraqi Foreign Minister from 1963 to 1964. He was a Free Officer with a strong proclivity toward Cairo. He also served as interior minister during the mid-1960s. He went into exile and survived an assassination attempt at Cairo in 1972.

Political offices
Preceded by Salih Mahdi Ammash	Foreign Minister of Iraq; 1963–1964	Succeeded by Naji Talib
