= Nasser al-Hani =

Iraqi career diplomat

Nasser al-Hani (died November 10 or 11, 1968) was an Iraqi career diplomat. He served as the Ambassador of Iraq to the United States from April 1964 to June 1967, and as Iraq's Foreign Minister from July 18 to July 30, 1968. After he was replaced by Abdul Karim al-Shaikhly, he was abducted from his Baghdad residence and assassinated on November 10 or November 11, 1968.
