= Ministry of Foreign Affairs (Iraq) =

Government ministry of Iraq

Minister of Foreign Affairs of the Republic of Iraq
- وزارة الخارجية العراقية
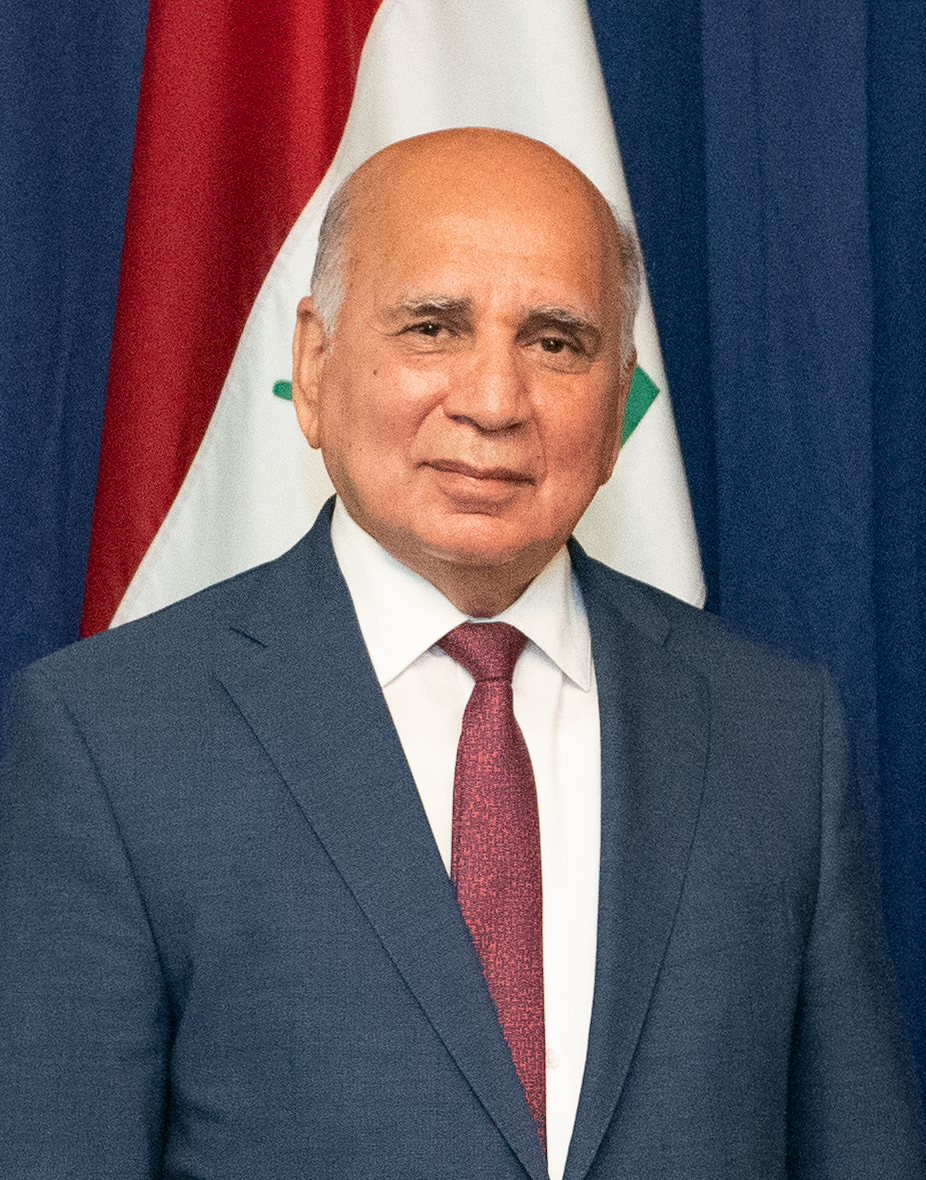
- Incumbent; Fuad Hussein since 6 June 2020
- Ministry of Foreign Affairs
- Member of: Cabinet
- Reports to: Prime Minister
- Seat: Green Zone
- Nominator: Prime Minister
- Appointer: Council of Representatives
- Term length: Four-year term, renewable
- Formation: 1924
- Website: https://mofa.gov.iq/

The Ministry of Foreign Affairs of the Republic of Iraq is a central government ministry of Iraq, responsible for formulating foreign policy and conducting foreign relations of the country.

== Organisation ==
Iraq maintains 86 Diplomatic missions worldwide.

== List of ministers ==
The following is a list of foreign ministers of Iraq since 1924:

=== Kingdom of Iraq (1921–1958) ===
- 1924–1930: the prime ministers
- 1930–1931: Abdullah Bey al-Damluji
- 1931–1932: Ja'far al-Askari
- 1932–1933: Abdul Qadir Rashid
- 1933–1934: Nuri al-Said
- 1934: Abdullah Bey al-Damluji
- 1934: Tawfiq al-Suwaidi
- 1934–1936: Nuri al-Said
- 1936–1937: Naji al-Asil
- 1937–1938: Tawfiq al-Suwaidi
- 1938–1939: Nuri al-Said
- 1939–1940: Ali Jawdat Al-Ayyubi
- 1940–1941: Nuri al-Said
- 1941: Ali Mahmud al-Shaykh
- 1941: Taha al-Hashimi
- 1941: Tawfiq al-Suwaidi
- 1941: Musa al-Shabandar
- 1941: Ali Jawdat Al-Ayyubi
- 1941–1942: Sayyid Salih Jabr (acting)
- 1942: Abdullah Bey al-Damluji (acting)
- 1942: Dawood Al-Haidari (acting)
- 1942: Nuri al-Said (acting)
- 1942–1943: Abdul Ilah al-Hafiz
- 1943: Nasrat al-Farisi
- 1943: Abdul Ilah al-Hafiz
- 1943–1944: Mahmud Subhi al-Daftari
- 1944–1945: Arshad al-Umari
- 1945–1946: Hamdi al-Pachachi
- 1946: Tawfiq al-Suwaidi
- 1946: Ali Mumtaz
- 1946–1948: Muhammad Fadhel al-Jamali
- 1948: Hamdi al-Pachachi
- 1948: Nasrat al-Farisi
- 1948: Muzahim al-Bajaji
- 1948–1949: Ali Jawdat Al-Ayyubi
- 1949: Abdul Ilah al-Hafiz
- 1949: Muhammad Fadhel al-Jamali
- 1949: Shakir al-Wadi
- 1949–1950: Muzahim al-Bajaji
- 1950: Tawfiq al-Suwaidi
- 1950–1951: Shakir al-Wadi
- 1951: Tawfiq al-Suwaidi
- 1951–1952: Shakir al-Wadi
- 1952: Muhammad Fadhel al-Jamali
- 1953: Tawfiq al-Suwaidi
- 1953–1954: Abdullah Bakr
- 1954: Musa al-Shabandar
- 1954: Muhammad Fadhel al-Jamali
- 1954–1955: Musa al-Shabander
- 1955–1957: Burhanuddin Bashayan
- 1957: Ali Jawdat Al-Ayyubi
- 1957–1958: Burhanuddin Bashayan
- 1958: Muhammad Fadhel al-Jamali
- 1958: Tawfiq al-Suwaidi

=== Iraqi Republic (1958–1968) ===
- 1958–1959: Abdul Jabbar Jomard
- 1959–1963: Hashem Jawad
- 1963: Talib Shabib
- 1963: Salih Mahdi Ammash
- 1963–1964: Subhi Abdul Hamid
- 1964–1965: Naji Talib
- 1965: Abdul Rahman al-Bazzaz
- 1965–1967: Adnan Pachachi
- 1967–1968: Ismail Khairallah (acting)

=== Ba'athist Iraq (1968–2003) ===
- 1968: Nasser al-Hani
- 1968–1971: Abdul Karim al-Shaikhly
- 1971: Rashid al-Rifai
- 1971–1974: Murtada Said Abdel Baki al-Hadithi
- 1974: Shathel Taqa
- 1974: Hisham al-Shawi (acting)
- 1974–1983: Sa'dun Hammadi
- 1983–1991: Tariq Aziz
- 1991–1992: Ahmad Husayn Khudayir as-Samarrai
- 1992–2001: Muhammad Saeed al-Sahhaf
- 2001: Tariq Aziz (acting)
- 2001–2003: Naji Sabri

=== Republic of Iraq (2004–present) ===
Name	Portrait	Term of office		Political party	Prime Minister
Hoshyar Zebari		1 September 2003	11 July 2014	Kurdistan Democratic Party	Coalition Provisional Authority, Ayad Allawi, Ibrahim al-Jaafari, and Nouri al-Maliki
Hussain al-Shahristani (interim)		11 July 2014	8 September 2014	State of Law Coalition	Nouri al-Maliki
Ibrahim al-Jaafari		8 September 2014	25 October 2018	State of Law Coalition	Haider al-Abadi
Mohamed Ali Alhakim		25 October 2018	12 May 2020	Independent	Adil Abdul-Mahdi
Mustafa Al-Kadhimi (interim)		12 May 2020	6 June 2020	Independent	Mustafa Al-Kadhimi, Mohammed Shia al Sudani and Ali al-Zaidi
Fuad Hussein		6 June 2020	Incumbent	Kurdistan Democratic Party	Mustafa Al-Kadhimi, Mohammed Shia al Sudani and Ali al-Zaidi
