= Mohammed Hamza Zubeidi =

Prime minister of Iraq from 1991 to 1993

Mohammed Hamza az-Zubeidi
- محمد حمزة الزبيدي
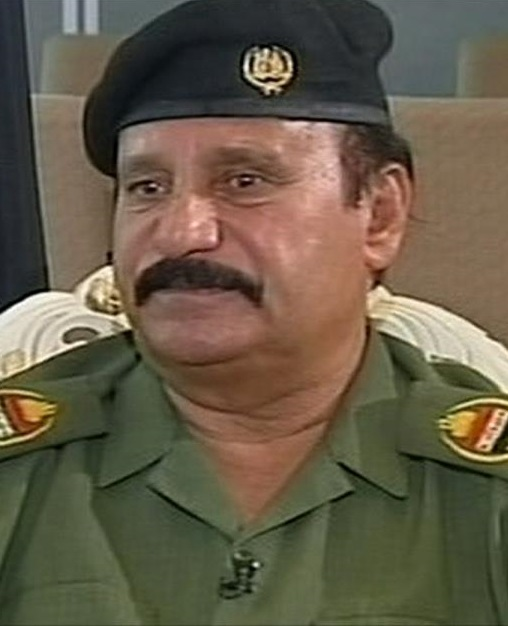
- Zubeidi in the 1990s

Prime Minister of Iraq
- In office September 16, 1991 – September 5, 1993
- President: Saddam Hussein
- Preceded by: Sa'dun Hammadi
- Succeeded by: Ahmad Husayn Khudayir as-Samarrai

Personal details
- Born: 1938 Iraq
- Died: December 2, 2005 (aged 66–67) Iraq
- Party: Ba'ath Party

Mohammed Hamza al-Zubeidi (1938 – December 2, 2005) (Arabic: محمد حمزة الزبيدي) was an Iraqi military officer and politician who served as the Prime Minister of Iraq from 1991 to 1993. He is on the "Saddam's Dirty Dozen" list of people responsible for torture and murder in Iraq, playing a key role in Iraq's brutal suppression of the 1991 Iraqi uprisings. He was featured in Iraqi news film kicking and beating captured rebels.

== Career ==
Az-Zubeidi was a Ba'athist whose loyalty lay with his ethnicity (Arab) rather than his personal faith (Shia Islam). He played a key part in the suppression of the multi-ethnic Shiite uprising in March 1991. He became the country's Prime minister in September that year and remained in this position for two years, until he was replaced by Ahmad Husayn Khudayir as-Samarrai in September 1993.

He was a member of the Revolutionary Command Council and the commander of the Central Euphrates military district, but had not been in power for two years.

He was the Queen of Spades in the deck of most-wanted Iraqi playing cards issued by the US government during the war in Iraq. After the fall of Saddam Hussein's regime, he was captured on April 20, 2003, near the small city of Mahaweel.

He remained in American custody until his death of natural causes in a military hospital on December 2, 2005. On that day, an American spokesman revealed that someone had died in a military hospital but did not reveal his name. Two days later, Saddam Hussein's half-brother Barzan Ibrahim al-Tikriti announced Zubeidi's death at his trial, complaining that they were both suffering from cancer and that he did not want to end up dead like Zubeidi because of what he claimed was poor medical treatment.

Political offices
Preceded by Sa'dun Hammadi	Prime Minister of Iraq; 1991–1993	Succeeded by Ahmad Husayn Khudayir as-Samarrai
