= Ali Mumtaz al-Daftary =

Iraqi politician

Minister of Foreign Affairs
- In office 21 May 1946 – 30 May 1946
- Monarch: King Faisal II
- Prime Minister: Ali Jawdat al-Aiyubi
- Preceded by: Tawfiq al-Suwaidi
- Succeeded by: Muhammad Fadhel al-Jamali

Minister of Finance
- In office 3 February 1941 – 13 April 1941
- Prime Minister: Taha al-Hashimi

Personal details
- Born: 1901 Baghdad, Iraq
- Died: 1990s

Ali Mumtaz al-Daftary (Arabic: علي ممتاز الدفتري) was an Iraqi nationalist-oriented politician, held several posts in the Kingdom of Iraq, including parliamentary and ministerial positions.

== Biography ==
He was born in 1901. Ali Mumtaz al-Daftary belongs to the al-Daftary family, a well-known family, including Mahmoud Subhi al-Daftary, Sabih Mumtaz al-Daftary, and Naim Mumtaz al-Daftary, and was married to Ms. Nemat bint Yassin al-Hashemi.

Al-Daftary worked at the Ministry of Finance early in the founding of the Kingdom of Iraq. He was part of Taha al-Hashemi's ministry in 1941. He served as finance minister the same year in the third ministry of Nuri al-Said.

After that, he served as Minister of Foreign Affairs in the Second Ministry of Tawfiq al Souwaidy from May 21, 1946 to May 30, 1946. Then in 1946, he was part of the fourth cabinet of Nuri al-Said, where he served as Minister of works and transportation and a representative of the Liberal Party, but later resigned. Al-Daftary was an opponent of Jabr and supported the 1948 demonstrations.

Al-Daftary was finance minister again in 1948. After the resignation of Muhammad Fadhel al-Jamali's ministry in 1954, Nuri al-Said offered him to participate in his ministry, but he apologized, and Nuri al-Said later apologized for the formation of the government that entrusted Arshad al-Omari to form his second cabinet.

In 1957, he served as acting foreign minister in Ali Jawdat al Ayyubi's third ministry. He was reported to have died in 1990s.

== Literature ==
- Ali Mumtaz al-Daftary and his political role in Iraq (milestones in the politics of Iraq in the monarchy) by Hamid Faraj Abdul Hussein. Published in 2018. A master thesis presented in 2014 to basic education at Mustansiriya University.
