= Muhammad Fadhel al-Jamali =

Prime minister of Iraq from 1953 to 1954

- محمد فاضل الجمالي
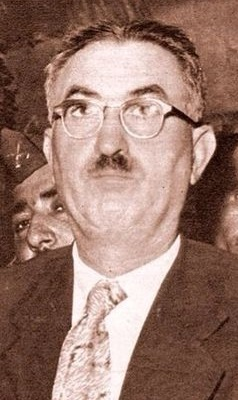

Prime Minister of Iraq
- In office 17 September 1953 – 29 April 1954
- Monarch: Faisal II
- Preceded by: Jamil al-Midfai
- Succeeded by: Arshad al-Umari

Foreign Minister of Iraq
- In office 1 July 1946 – 27 January 1948
- Monarch: Faisal II
- Prime Minister: Arshad al-Umari; Nuri al-Said; Sayyid Salih Jabr
- Preceded by: Ali Mumtaz al-Daftary
- Succeeded by: Hamdi al-Bachachi

Member of the Arab Union Council
- In office 21 May 1958 – 21 May 1958
- Monarchs: Faisal II; Hussein

Personal details
- Born: April 20, 1903 Kadhimiya, Baghdad, Ottoman Empire
- Died: May 24, 1997 (aged 94) Tunis, Tunisia
- Spouse: Sara Powell
- Education: American University of Beirut; Columbia University

Muhammad Fadhel al-Jamali (Arabic: محمد فاضل الجمالي) (20 April 1903 – 24 May 1997) was an Iraqi statesman, educator, politician and diplomat, who held important posts in the government of Iraq, during the royal era. Most notably he served as Iraq's prime minister two times and foreign minister from 1946 to 1948 and was also the Director of Foreign Affairs and a member of the Arab Federation Council in 1958.

Born to a Shi'ite family in al-Kadhimiya neighborhood of Baghdad, they were traditionally custodians of Al-Kadhimiya Mosque. He began his political career in 1943. During the 1945 United Nations conference, al-Jamali, as the Minister of Foreign Affairs, signed the Charter of the United Nations on behalf of his country and continued to represent Iraq several times during the United Nations meetings. He played an important role in the independence of Tunisia. After the 14 July Revolution in 1958, al-Jamali was exile to Tunisia, where he served as an advisor to Habib Bourguiba.

He died on 24 May 1997, at the age of 94. Al-Jamali is considered one of the most prominent figures in politics and education in Iraq and the Arab World along with being one of the most notable and well-known prime ministers during the Royal era of Iraq, his academic excellence qualified him to obtain the most prestigious scientific degrees in the most prestigious universities in the world despite his upbringing in a conservative and religious environment. He was also the first Iraqi to hold a doctorate in education from Harvard.

== Early life and education ==
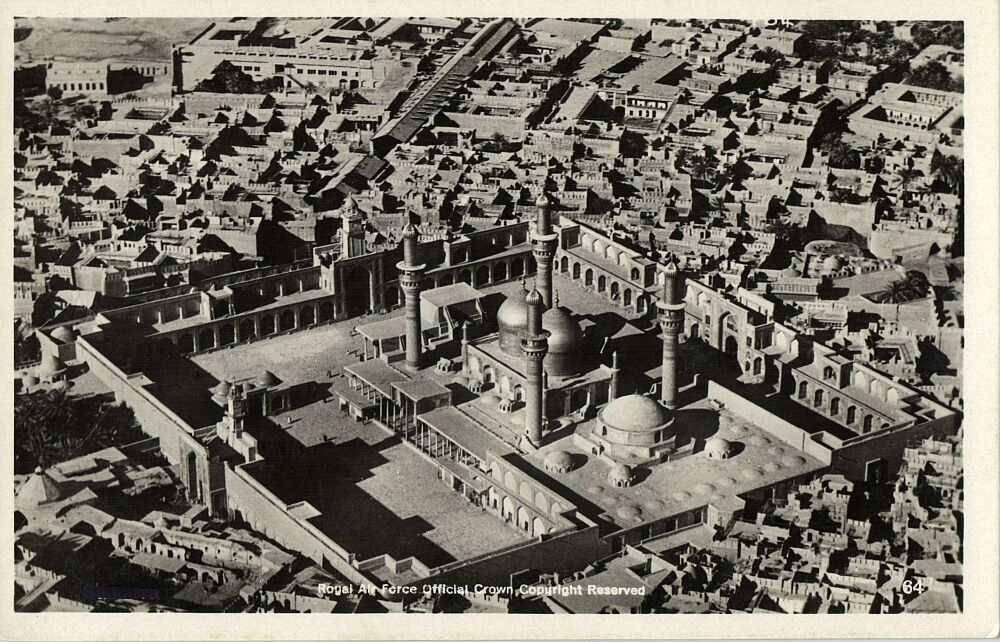
Al-Kadhimiya Mosque in Kadhimiya that al-Jamali's family participated in its custodianship.

Muhammad Fadhel al-Jamali was born on 20 April 1903 in al-Kadhimiya, near Baghdad, the son of a Shi'a Muslim cleric, Sheikh Abbas al-Jamali. He belongs to a religious family that participates in the custodianship of the shrine of al-Kadhimiya Mosque and originally came from Bani Shaiba. The family have in their keeping a royal firman issued on the month of Muharram, 1020 AH (1611 AD) from the Ottoman Sultan and Caliph Ahmed I that grants the Jamal ed-Din bin Mullah Ali, an ancestor of the al-Jamali family whom the family gets its name from, full care of the mosque and shrine. Al-Jamali lived near the mosque in a strict and conservative environment and frequently went to the golden mosque for prayers and Quranic learning. Visitors coming to the mosque also used to consult his father. During World War I, the Arab Revolt, with Faisal I being in it, swept across the Middle East, and Faisal I would later become the first King of Iraq. Faisal's actions would personify Arab nationalism for al-Jamali's generation. His entourage to Iraq, the idea of liberation and Arab unity would inspire a young al-Jamali and leave a deep impression on him. Al-Jamali's mother, a well-known poet from Hillah, would die in 1938 with his father following in just three years.

Al-Jamali would later describe the habits and attitudes he learned in Childhood which he had to overcome later in life as he grew up, these included:

"A negative attitude toward Sunni Muslims, believing that God would send them to Hell; the feeling that he had to go daily to Kadhimiya Mosque to pray; that he must not look at women's faces or even listen to their voices except for members of his own family; the obligation to pay respect to great religious personalities, kissing their right hands on meeting; a negative attitude toward government officials, believing that, since they were Sunnis, they could not be honest people."

His early education was a religious one, attending the religious seminary of Sheikh Mehdi Al-Khalissi. He used to go to the Alliance School every Friday to acquire French books and learn the French language. He practiced the profession of teaching in Iraq which made him suitable for becoming a primary teacher. He then continued his studies at the American University of Beirut with a government scholarship. Then he returned to Baghdad for a short time and lectured at the university he graduated from, before moving to the United States. Although his conservative family refused to approve of his travels, the Sheikhs of al-Kadhimiya approved, even if he studied at a Christian university. After graduating from the American University in Beirut, and Teachers College of Columbia University in New York City, he taught for some time in Iraq before entering public life. He obtained the degree of Professor of Arts in education from Teachers College at Columbia University in 1930, after which he obtained a doctorate in philosophy in 1934, and the topic of the thesis he submitted for obtaining his doctorate was called "New Iraq", then Columbia University awarded him an honorary doctorate in law in 1954. Boston University awarded him an honorary doctorate in 1956.

In 1944, he joined the Iraqi Ministry of Foreign Affairs. Later he served as Director General of Education. Although he was a Shi'a Muslim, he promoted harmony and educational equality with Sunni Muslims when he was Director General of Education. He also undermined the power of the ancient Shi'a in the shrine cities of Kadhimiya, Najaf and Karbala. Due to being an Arab nationalist, he constantly urged Sunni Muslims and Shi'a Muslims to identify themselves with Iraq rather than with sectarian communities or tribes. However, it was noted that he appointed many more Shi'a teachers than Sunni teachers. Al-Jamali enjoyed great influence in directing education and student knowledge in Iraq from 1932 to 1942.

== Political career ==
In 1943, under the orders of Nuri al-Said, al-Jamali was appointed the Director General of Foreign Affairs because al-Said saw him as qualified for the role. This did not please al-Jamali at first but grew to the role. At the time, he was one of the only educated Iraqis with overseas experiences which further supported this career switch although there were rumors that al-Jamali had Axis leanings. Nevertheless, al-Jamali spared no opportunity to urge the need for the independence of Lebanon and Syria from the French mandates. Following the fall of Vichy France, Lebanon and Syria gained their independence.

In 1945, al-Jamali first became the Minister of Foreign Affairs of Iraq, a position he held continuously for three years. As a representative of Iraq, he signed the Charter of the United Nations on behalf of his country. In 1949 he again became Minister of Foreign Affairs. At the same time, from 1947 to 1958 he was the head of the Iraqi representation at the United Nations, and in 1950 he was also Iraq's ambassador to Egypt. Al-Jamali was appointed Minister of Foreign Affairs twice more. The third in 1952 in the government of then-prime minister Mustafa al-Umari, and the fourth in the same year during the cabinet of Nureddin Mahmud.

=== United Nations ===
Iraq was considered a developing country then and was invited as part of the 45 nations to start the United Nations. Al-Jamali's debut at a major world conference was at the organizational meetings of the United Nations in San Francisco in the late spring of 1945. As Director General of Foreign Affairs, he was outranked by the other members of the Iraqi delegation such as Foreign Minister Arshad al-Umari; who represented the United States at the time, Ali Jawdat al-Ayyubi, and Nasrat al-Farisi. Nevertheless, he took part in the committees drafting the portions of the UN Charter that dealt with trusteeship and with the UN Security Council. On the weekend of that week, the diplomats, including al-Jamali, visited Curry Village in Yosemite Valley and was noted in the news for his modest attitude and open-mindedness towards seeking multicultural understanding. Al-Jamali also took part in Arab delegations that wanted to ensure the independence of Syria, and Lebanon, and the protection of Palestine from Zionism.

He was a member of both houses of the old Iraqi Parliament and was Minister of Foreign Affairs eight times in six ministries between 1946 and 1953. He was twice the president of the Chamber of Deputies between October 1950 and September 1953. The Iraqi government chose him to sign the United Nations Charter in the name of Iraq and became the representative of Iraq at the founding ceremony of the United Nations Organization in 1945. He also participated in the maintenance of the International Charter through his participation in two important committees of the conference, namely, the committee that drafted the Security Council.

Because of the communist threat from the Soviet Union along Iraq's northeastern border, he advocated for a strong affiliation with the United States and the United Kingdom, at a time when the United States of America seemed to be a good ally for the Arab world, but he later confessed his disappointment at the way America treated his country, the Arab world, and the problems in the middle east in general. Al-Jamali contributed to the development of modern national education in Iraq, as he prompted the Iraqi government to bring in the "Dabul Monroe Committee" from Columbia University to study the reality of education in Iraq. When the United States President Dwight D. Eisenhower proposed aiding "Near East" countries, al-Jamali pointed out that Iraq has been feeling political and social danger for years due to the situations in the Korean War, Vietnam War, and Eastern Europe, and welcomed Eisenhower economic and military aid to protect Iraq from communism and subversion.

=== Libya ===
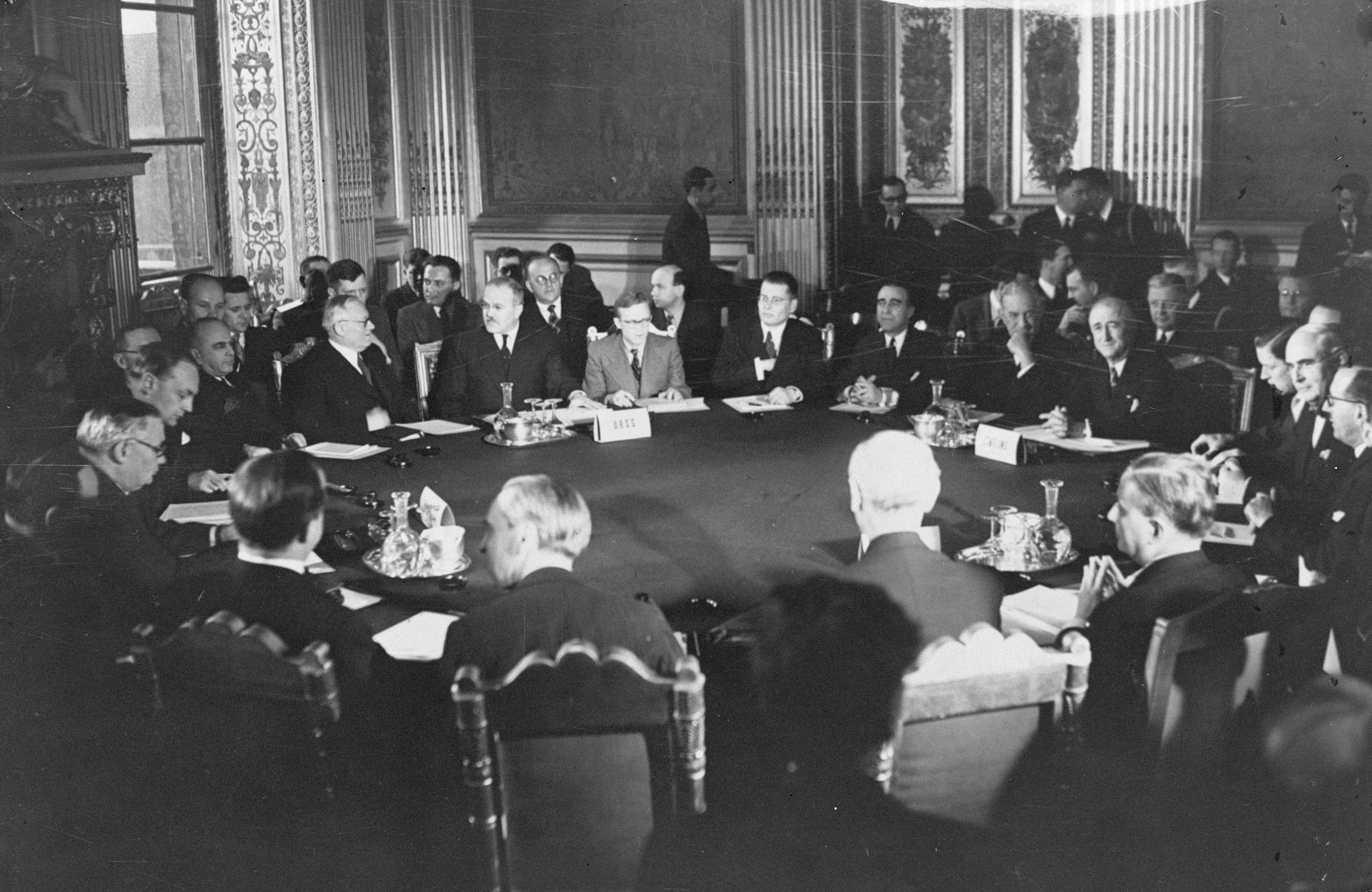
The 1946 Paris Peace Conference, which al-Jamali attended on behalf of Iraq

In September 1946, al-Jamali represented Iraq at the Paris Peace Conference which was to decide the fate of the former Italian colony of Libya for which he asked for immediate independence from Italy. Despite his request, various countries at the conference had interests in Libya. The United Kingdom wanted Cyrenaica, Italy and the Soviet Union both wanted Tripoli, France wanted the Fezzan, and the United States wanted an air base in Libya. Al-Jamali urged that, if the conference did not grant immediate independence, trusteeship powers should be exercised either by the Arab League or by a League member.

=== Palestine ===
Muhammad Fadhel al-Jamali was known for defending Palestine in his speeches, writing, articles, and international forums. Whenever he was at a United Nations conference, he would mention Palestinians and their struggles and spoke highly of their heritage. He urged for a multicultural Palestinian state. Al-Jamali warned of Zionism having "something in common with Hitlerite technique" as it combined religion, race, and state into a "fanatic and one-sided ideology."

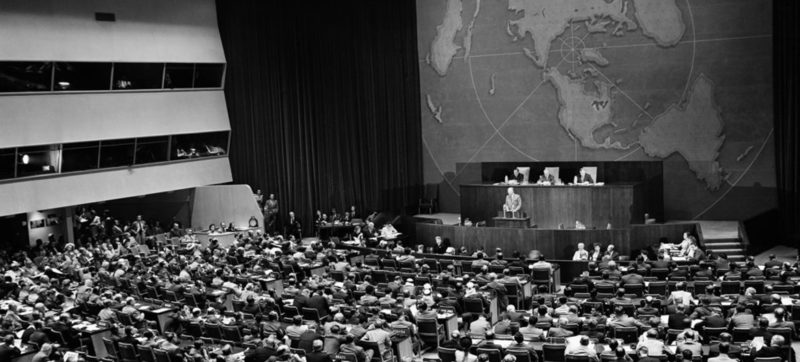
United Nations meeting on the partition of Palestine in 1947, al-Jamali was against the partition

Al-Jamali had been following the question of Palestine very closely with deepening concern. Over time, the issue of Palestine became one of al-Jamali's most time-occupying matters. Under the pen name "Ibn al-Iraq", al-Jamali began in 1944 to write a series of newspaper articles to warn the public of Zionism which he saw as a threat. These were eventually collected in pamphlet form and printed in Cairo under the title "The Zionist Danger". Ibn Saud of Saudi Arabia, and Crown-Prince Abd al-Ilah, on behalf of King Faisal II, also wrote similar letters to US President Roosevelt arguing that Palestine legally belonged to its natives and reminded the president of Caliph Umar's taking of Palestine and the Crusades. Al-Jamali helped to translate Abd al-Ilah's letter into English.

In December 1944, al-Jamali helped establish Arab League Offices for Palestine in Britain and America under the direction of Musa al-'Alami. Musa headed the Information offices funded by Iraq from 1944 until 1948. This led to defiance by the Mufti of Jerusalem, Hajj Amin al-Husseini, who saw this as a threat to his position. He would later meet with al-Jamali in Cairo in 1947 in which he sought to improve relations with Iraq and express his innocence of encouraging Rashid Ali al-Gaylani's revolt in 1941.

Al-Jamali, representing Iraq, also joined Egyptian Foreign Minister, Mansur Fahmy, in condemning Zionism as an aggressive and reactionary threat to Middle Eastern security. This was done in opposition to Harry S. Truman's order of granting entry to 100,000 deported Jews into Palestine and the Anglo-American Committee of Inquiry. Al-Jamali invited the committee to Baghdad to hear political leaders from there, both Arab and Jew. The Committee declined the invitation and concluded its agreement with Truman which caused an outrage in the Arab League. He would then propose to tell the United States that oil importation would stop if Palestine became partitioned but Arab delegations were opposed to the idea. Ex-Iraqi Prime Minister, Hamdi al-Pachachi, reportedly wanted his statement to be deleted to which al-Jamali would later reportedly reply with "Delete the words, but you cannot delete the situation. The facts still apply.''

==== United Nations statement on Palestine ====
In a speech at the General Assembly Hall at Flushing Meadow, New York, on Friday, 28 November 1947, Muhammad Fadhel al-Jamali included the following statement on the United Nations Partition Plan for Palestine:

Partition imposed against the will of the majority of the people will jeopardize peace and harmony in the Middle East. Not only the uprising of the Arabs of Palestine is to be expected, but the masses in the Arab world cannot be restrained. The Arab-Jewish relationship in the Arab world will greatly deteriorate. There are more Jews in the Arab world outside of Palestine than there are in Palestine. In Iraq alone, we have about one hundred and fifty thousand Jews who share with Muslims and Christians all the advantages of political and economic rights. Harmony prevails among Muslims, Christians, and Jews. But any injustice imposed upon the Arabs of Palestine will disturb the harmony among Jews and non-Jews in Iraq; it will breed inter-religious prejudice and hatred.

=== Israel ===
Despite al-Jamali's and the rest of the Arab delegations' best efforts, the partition of Palestine ensued and Israel gained its independence in 1948. The Soviet Union wanted to recognize Israel but later switched their support to the Arab countries. In response to the USSR's support of Israel, al-Jamali questioned Soviet Foreign Minister Andrey Vyshinsky several times about the USSR's involvement in establishing Israel despite calling Zionism a "reactionary force" in countless Soviet works. Vyshinsky had never given him a proper reply. Abba Eban, former Israeli Foreign Affairs Minister, claimed an incident in which al-Jamali had placed a cigar between him and the Israel Minister since Iraq and Israel were seated next to each other in the UN, and another in which al-Jamali left a restaurant out of spite when Eban walked in. Al-Jamali would later deny these claims as he neither smoked nor left behind unfinished food.

=== Egypt ===
Al-Jamali, then a Minister Plenipotentiary, was dispatched to Cairo to meet with Nokrashy Pasha, who was a good friend of al-Jamali, in 1948. However, King Abdullah I of Jordan would later inform him that the Egyptians hadn't arranged for a meeting. Al-Jamali then became Minister to Egypt for 25 days with Hashim Hilli, a worker at the foreign ministry, who accompanied him to Egypt and the two developed a friendship. The Iraqi government had to loan him 585 Iraqi dinars to buy a Chrysler Windsor (Series C-38) to help him at his post. King Farouk would also invite al-Jamali to attend Friday Prayers with him and planned to receive him. This, however, was discontinued when Nuri al-Said wanted al-Jamali to return to Baghdad. Al-Jamali would return three days later to bid his farewells to the King of Egypt and the Egyptian ambassador.

=== Prime Minister of Iraq ===
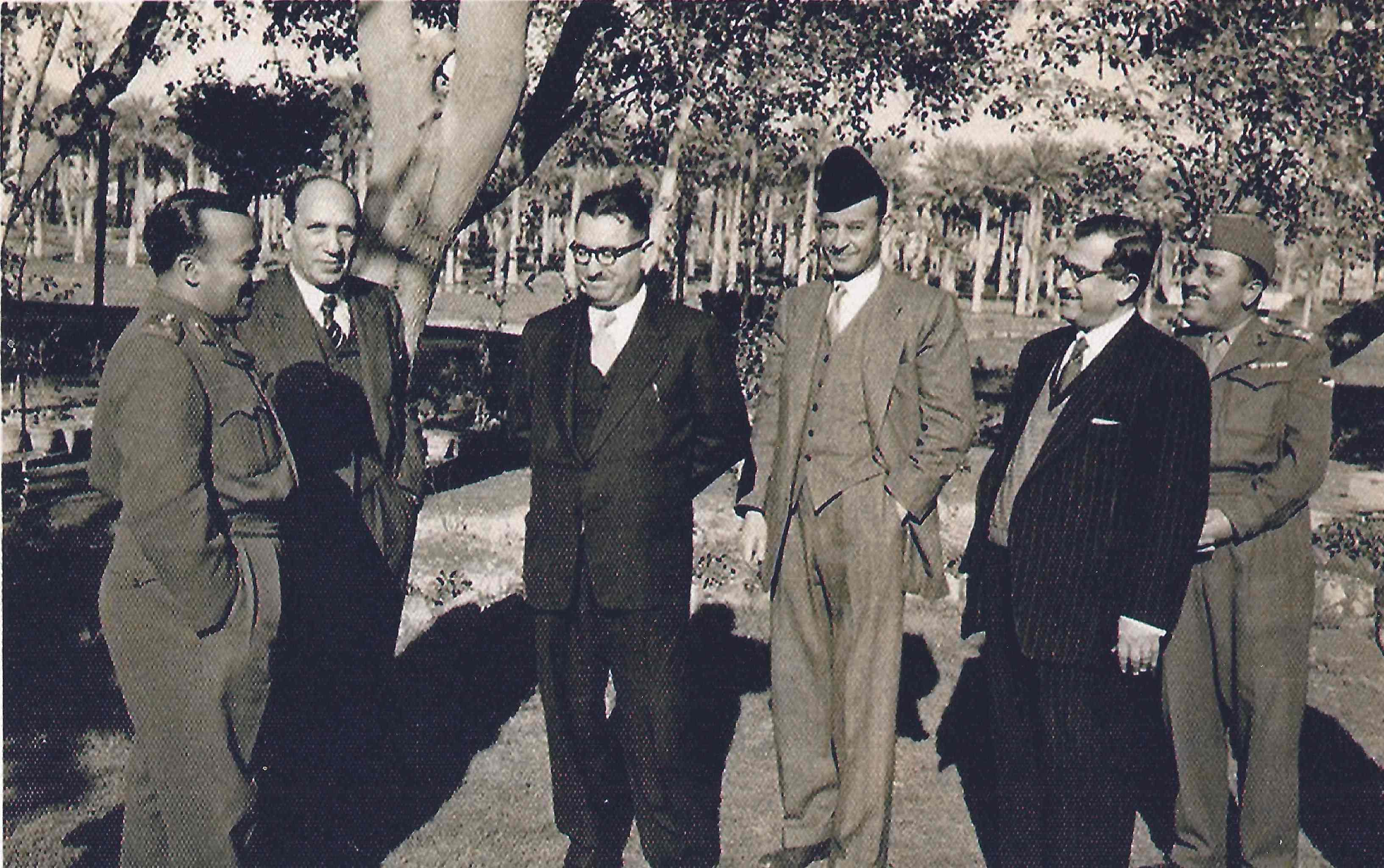
Muhammad Fadhel al-Jamali (third to the left) and Musa Kadhim Bey (second to the left).

On September 17, 1953, King Faisal II of Iraq entrusted Muhammad Fadhel al-Jamali with the task of forming a new government. Al-Jamali appointed mainly young officials, including people who had already proposed land reform, social security, and government organizations. Al-Jamali also intended to improve state structures and increase their authority. More than half of the ministers were Shi'a Muslims, and the interior ministry was taken over by a Kurd. The new cabinet was received positively as until then, most of the Iraqi elite was dominated by Sunni Muslims. He was further supported by Nuri al-Said who hoped that al-Jamali would promote the development of the country and stop the development of the Iraqi Communist Party.

That same month, al-Jamali abolished press censorship and ended the state of emergency in the country which was introduced a year earlier, lifting restrictions on the activities of political parties. Al-Jamali made sure to control the Iraqi Communist Party and trade unions. He declared a state of emergency in the provenance of Basra when oil workers working in Basra declared a strike. In December 1954, al-Jamali presented proposals to moderate reforms of the taxation system and limited land reform. These reforms were opposed by landowners and meant breaking up the traditional networks of Clientelism that have persisted since independence. Al-Jamali's government also worked to establish an anti-communist alliance between Iraq, Iran, Türkiye and Pakistan which it announced to the public in February 1954. Although there were many protests against Iraq joining an anti-Communist alliance. Due to this, al-Jamali wanted to step down as Prime Minister on March 7, 1954, but Nuri al-Said convinced him to stay.

In the spring of 1954, large landowners, including both Sunni and Shi'a Muslim landowners, opposed rural reforms of the government. Some of the al-Jamali's associates, disappointed with the impossibility of implementing any changes, left the cabinet. Nuri al-Said eventually stopped supporting the new government and al-Jamali decided to resign from being Prime Minister.

== Bandung Conference ==
After the end of World War II and the process of decolonization, new Asian and African countries needed a basis of association with each other and the Arab World was among them. At the time, Africans and Asians represented a minority in the United Nations. Al-Jamali would meet with several delegations such as Asaf Ali that concerned the Palestinian question and the founding stones of the Afro-Asian conference. In the late 1940s and the 1950s, al-Jamali would work with figures such as Charles Malik of Lebanon, Faris al-Khoury of Syria, and Mahmud Fawzi of Egypt in consultation concerning the future of former colonies in Africa such as Libya and Eritrea. When the question of Morocco and Tunisia came up, Habib Bourguiba and other Tunisian leaders asked al-Jamali to pursue the Tunisian case during a luncheon for the heads of the Arab delegations. Al-Jamali first met Bourguiba in Cairo in April 1946 and their friendship really began in 1951 in Paris at the General Assembly meeting. The Tunisians had failed in their negotiations with France for independence so al-Jamali helped advise Bourguiba on the case in which he brought up King Faisal I's independence policy. The two didn't meet until 1956 when Tunisia got its independence and al-Jamali brought Iraq's congratulations on their achievement of independence and al-Jamali was made an honorary citizen of Tunisia.

In April 1955, less than four months away from the agreed meeting, the meeting was agreed to be in Bandung, Indonesia. Many nations of Africa and Asia including Iraq were invited for the discussion of Africa and Asia in the new setting of world politics and the Cold War. Nuri al-Said as the incumbent prime minister was naturally expected to lead the Iraq delegation. However, al-Said was preoccupied with domestic problems and with setting up the mechanism of the Baghdad Pact, so he requested King Faisal II to order al-Jamali to lead the delegation. Al-Jamali made his delegation and invited former cabinet colleagues such as Hashim Hilli. Being a conference of none-aligned countries, it was attended by many leaders such as former Indian prime minister Jawaharlal Nehru and then-Egyptian President Gamal Abdel Nasser. Most of the countries were neutral but some delegations were anti-communist, which was the sentiment al-Jamali and the Iraqi delegation held.

Before the conference, al-Jamali attended Friday prayers at Bandung's Great Mosque and visited a few schools. He also enjoyed watching Indonesian land when he was on car trips. When President Sukarno opened the meeting, Nehru urged that there be no opening speeches but that, if any delegations had statements to make, they could be printed and circulated. Al-Jamali objected strongly as did others, and they proved to be the majority. Al-Jamali wanted a half-hour limit, but a fifteen-minute limit was decided. Al-Jamali's opening statement nevertheless took twenty-three minutes. Al-Jamali, as well as other delegations, wanted to discuss the Palestinian problem, however, Burma's prime Minister U Nu threatened to withdraw Burma from the conference. Despite this, al-Jamali talked about the threats of Western colonialism, Zionism, and communism to world peace and discussed the importance of Western values and the values of large Spiritual religions. The New York Times reported the conference fully and remarked that al-Jamali's speech received more applause than that of any other delegate, noting that it was "a vigorous anti-communist attack."

A popular recent rumor concerning al-Jamali and Bourguiba concerns that in 1954, al-Jamali met and gave Bourguiba an Iraqi passport to enter the UN headquarters in New York City to give a speech on behalf of Tunisia which resulted in the French delegation leaving and helping Tunisia's independence. However, there's no evidence of such an event happening or al-Jamali carrying extra Iraqi passports casually. Al-Jamali also did not have permission for citizenship or an Iraqi passport for anyone he pleased. Even if such an event happened, it would likely get Iraq into an international crisis and controversy. Although this rumor helped al-Jamali become a national hero.

== Arab Federation ==
During the Arab Federation, in which Iraq and Jordan united into a union, then-prime minister Nuri al-Said appointed al-Jamali as a member of the Arab Union Council on 21 May 1958 until 14 July of that year.

== Exile and later life ==
=== 14 July Revolution ===
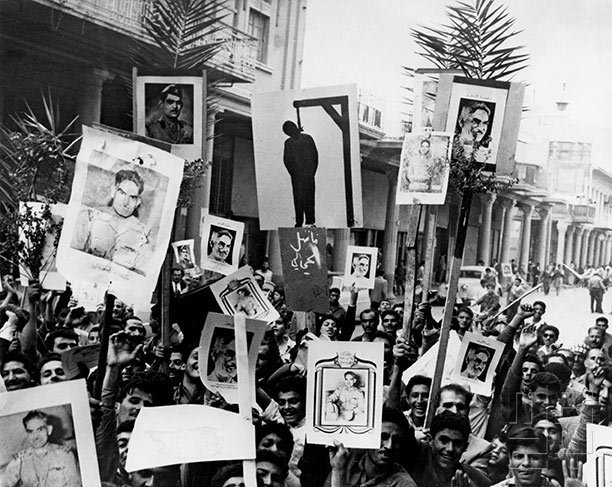
Crowds in al-Rashid Street calling for al-Jamali's execution.

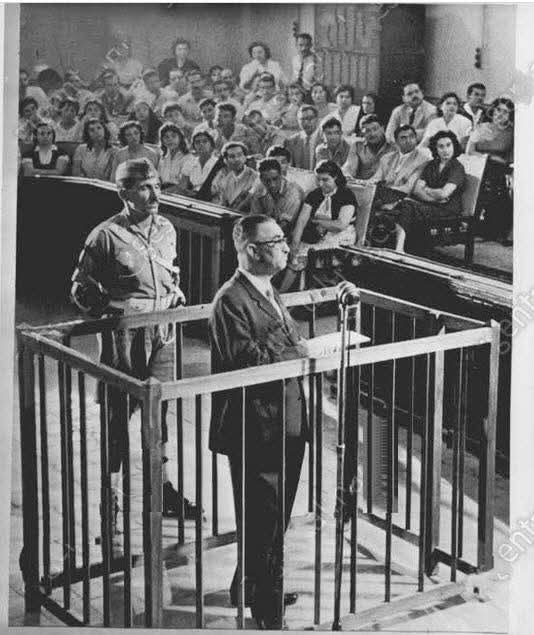
Al-Jamali at al-Mahdawi Court in 1958

After the Iraqi monarchy was overthrown in the 14 July 1958 Revolution, al-Jamali was pursued and arrested at a friend's home. During his imprisonment in which he faced various accusations of treason and conspiracy against Palestine despite defending Palestine throughout his life, al-Jamali wrote and published five articles that he published in newspapers in which he defended himself using historical facts and talked about his patriotism. Abd al-Karim Qasim sentenced him to death, but this was later commuted to 10 years imprisonment; he was released in 1961 after serving three years where he lived as a political refugee in Switzerland. His release came after global condemnation and pressure from many important international figures such as King Muhammad V of Morocco, Dag Hammarskjold, and Pope John XXIII.

While in prison, al-Jamali delved deeply into the study of the Qur'an and the rituals of Islam. While al-Jamali was a devout Muslim and believed in the religion's principles, his time in prison increased his faith even more. Al-Jamali wrote letters to his son in prison about Islam which later got published in a book. After his release, al-Jamali was met by several Baghdadis in his house overlooking the Tigris river located in the Necib Pasha locality in al-A'dhamiyya to take care of him and discuss the events with al-Jamali. Reportedly, al-Jamali felt grief over the tragic events of the coup.

=== Life during exile ===
After his exile, he was granted Tunisian citizenship by Tunisia's President Habib Bourguiba, whom he helped Tunisia become independent. Before that, he was also invited by King Hussein of Jordan and King Hassan of Morocco. Starting in the 1960s until 1988, he taught as Professor of Philosophy of Education, at the University of Tunis. Although the age of retirement in the university was 60, that was the age al-Jamali started to teach. There he was able to spread the Islamic beliefs that he had developed in several books. Al-Jamali lectured also Arabic history in the Arabic language.

Since he was an international diplomat, al-Jamali was rewarded with many medals and honors. Those include ones from countries such as Iraq, Jordan, Morocco, Iran, Republic of China, Tunisia, Spain, the Vatican City among more.

=== Death ===
Al-Jamali died in 1997 at the age of 94, he was buried in Tunisia. Upon his death, his body was transported back from Tunisia to Iraq where it was buried at the Wadi al-Salam cemetery in Najaf.

== Personal life ==
=== Marriage and children ===
In 1932, al-Jamali was married to Sarah Powell (February 22, 1908—March 3, 2000), who was born in Saskatchewan, Canada to American parents. They met while studying at the Teachers College of Columbia University in the late 1920s. She moved to Iraq with Fadhel al-Jamali and they had three sons: Laith, Usama, and Abbas. At a young age, Laith was stricken with encephalitis, which arrested his mental development. From her experience in caring for Laith, Sarah promoted public awareness of intellectual disability and wrote a book of her movement: The Story of Laith and His Life After Encephalitis. She also wrote Folktales from the City of the Golden Dome, a compilation of Iraqi folktales.

=== Writings ===
While in prison he wrote a series of letters to his son setting out the teaching and practice of Islam and its relevance to the problems and experience of the modern world. Following his release from prison, he compiled those letters into a book Letters on Islam. In one of his memoirs, he stated:

"The great shortcoming in the Iraqi state is: We did not educate the Iraqi people as it should be. As responsible for education, I bear part of the responsibility for the deterioration of education in Iraq. We adopted secularism in the state curricula and this was a grave mistake, it was assumed Education should be Islamic, as most Iraqis are Muslims."

The book's topics are man's need for religious faith; the Qur'an as guidance; the significance of fasting; science and faith; the nature of religious experience; the meaning of Islam; science, philosophy, and religion; the Islamic creed; Islamic rituals; the social system of Islam (legislation, the family, characteristics, economic principles, social, and government); and morality in Islam. In the book, al-Jamali detailed his beliefs:

"My faith calls for scientific research, especially in the field of natural science and social studies and the acceptance of the concept of evolution. I believe in the freedom of thought, and my faith in it is deep, provided it is associated with intellectual honesty."

Throughout al-Jamali's life, he wrote many books and published many articles in Arab, English, American, and French newspapers and magazines. Among his works are Suggested Directions for Education in England after the War (1943), The Future of Education in Iraq (1944), Raising the New Man (1947), Iraq's call to the Arab Union (1954), Iraq between yesterday and today (1954), An Open Letter to the honorable Iraqi People (1969), The Prospects for modern education in Developing Countries (1988), The Gulf Tragedy and Western Hegemony (1992), and Let the sun shine again on the Arab Nation (1996).

== Legacy ==
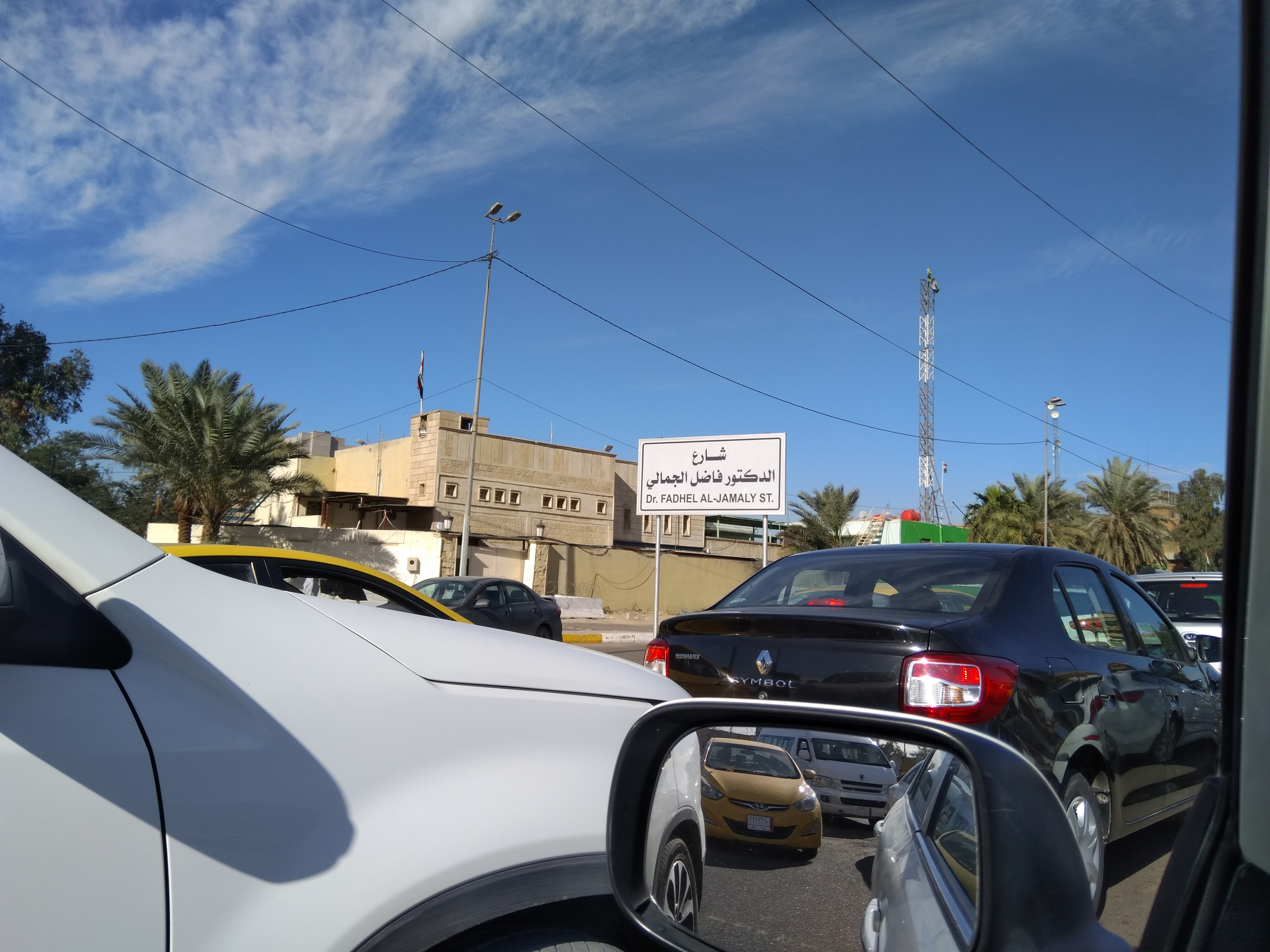
Fadhel al-Jamali St. in Baghdad.

The academic and researcher in political science, Dr. Yasser Abd al-Hussein, described al-Jamali as "the immortal icon of Iraqi diplomacy." Muhammad Fadhel Al-Jamali is remembered for his ethics compared to other politicians in which al-Jamali showed respect to his opponents.

Following the overthrow of Saddam Hussein in 2003, al-Jamali's writings became more popular throughout Iraq. His books appealed to the Iraqis: urged Muslims to comply with the Qur'an, but appealed to them to study modern science to keep pace with the West.

== Bibliography ==
- Almond, Harry (1993). Statesman: A Portrait of Mohammad Fadhel Jamali. Grosvenor Books. ISBN 1-85239-509-5.
- Sara P. Jamali, Folktales from the City of the Golden Dome.
- Mohammad Fadhel Jamali, Letters on Islam, Oxford University Press, London, 1965.
- Alan Rush, "Obituary Mohammad Fadhel Jamali", The Independent (London), June 3, 1997.
- Charis Waddy, "Obituary Sarah Parker Jamali", The Independent (London), March 27, 2000.
- Sarah P. Jamali, The Story of Laith and His Life after Encephalitis, Amman, 2000.
- Mohammad Fadhel Jamali, "Experiences in Arab Affairs: 1943-1958"
- Eppel, Michael (1999). "The Fadhil Al-Jamali Government in Iraq, 1953–54". Journal of Contemporary History. 34 (3): 417–442. doi:10.1177/002200949903400306. JSTOR 261147.
