= Dawood Al-Haidari =

Iraqi politician

- داود الحيدري
- Born: 1886; Erbil
- Died: 1965 (aged 78–79); Istanbul
- Other names: Dawood Pasha

Dawood Pasha Bin Sheikh Al-Islam Ibrahim Fasih Bin Sheikh Al-Islam Al-Sayyid Sibghat Allah Al-Haidari was an Iraqi politician who was born in Erbil in 1886. He died in Istanbul in 1965 and was buried there.

== Life ==
He finished middle school in Mosul. After graduation, he traveled in 1904 to Istanbul, entered the law school and obtained his degree in 1908, and after graduation, he was appointed an employee of the Turkish Ministry of Education as well as because of practicing law for some time and was accompanying Sultan Abdul Hamid, and he was fluent in Kurdish, Arabic and Turkish.

He joined the Turkish army in World War I and fought in his ranks.

He returned to Baghdad after the founding of the Iraqi state and was appointed in 1921 as a judicial inspector at the Ministry of Justice. In 1922, he was appointed secretary of the royal court. In 1924, he held the membership of the Constituent Assembly for the city of Erbil as well as the position of Vice-President of the Council.

After the council was dissolved, he was reinstated as secretary of trust at the royal court. In the session of the year 1925, he was also reelected as a deputy for the city of Erbil and a vice-president of the council were also re-elected. In the following two sessions in 1926 and 1927, he was re-elected to Parliament. In 1928, he was appointed Minister of Justice in the third Ministry of Abdul Mohsen Al-Saadoun. In 1929, he remained Minister of Justice at the Ministry of Tawfiq al-Suwaidi. From 1930 to 1933, he was re-elected as a representative of the city of Erbil.

He was re-elected to the Parliament in Erbil in 1930. In the same year, he became a lawyer for the British Oil Company in Baghdad.

In the year 1933, Prince Abdullah, the governor of Transjordan, was granted him the rank of Bashoy.

He joined the People's Party and opposed the 1926 treaty. He also worked as a lawyer and legal adviser for the British Oil Company. During the Rashid Ali Al-Kilani movement, Mr. Al-Haidari traveled to Amman and Jerusalem and returned with Prince Abdel-Ilah, who and was appointed Minister Plenipotentiary of Iraq in Tehran. In 1942 he was appointed Minister of State. In 1943, he returned as a member of Parliament was returned to the city of Sulaymaniyah. Then he was appointed Minister Plenipotentiary at the Foreign Office and transferred from it to London. In the year 1945, he was appointed a member of the Senate upper house and a minister without a ministry in the Ministry of Mr. Muhammad al-Sadr, and then the Ministry of Social Affairs was assigned to him.

He also served as Acting Minister of Foreign Affairs for the period from May 31, 1942 to July 3, 1942.

He left Iraq in 1958 after the July 14 revolution, and he lived traveling between Turkey, Switzerland and France, until he died in Turkey in 1965.
