= Sa'dun Hammadi =

Parliament Speaker of Iraq (1996 – 2003)

- سعدون حمادي
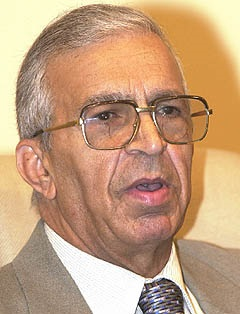
- Hammadi in the early 1990s

Speaker and President of the National Assembly of Iraq
- In office 8 April 1996 – 9 April 2003
- President: Saddam Hussein
- Vice President: Taha Muhieeldin Marouf; Izzat Ibrahim al-Douri; Taha Yassin Ramadan

Member of the Regional Command of the Iraqi Regional Branch
- In office 2 February 1962 – 31 May 2001

Prime Minister of Iraq
- In office 23 March 1991 – 13 September 1991
- Deputy: Tariq Aziz
- Preceded by: Saddam Hussein
- Succeeded by: Mohammed Hamza Zubeidi

Personal details
- Born: 22 June 1930 Karbala, Karbala Province, Kingdom of Iraq
- Died: 14 March 2007 (aged 76) Germany
- Resting place: Doha, Qatar
- Party: Arab Socialist Ba'ath Party (Iraqi Regional Branch)
- Education: University of Wisconsin-Madison, American University of Beirut

Sa'dun Hammadi (22 June 1930 – 14 March 2007; Arabic: سعدون حمادي) was an Iraqi politician, writer and economist who held various positions in the Iraqi state, most notably as the Minister of Foreign Affairs from 1974 to 1983, and later as the longest serving Speaker of the National Assembly under President Saddam Hussein from 1996 until the 2003 invasion of Iraq.

Born to a Shi'ite family in Karbala, Hammadi pursued higher education in Beirut and the United States. He began his political career in the late 1940s, when he joined the Ba'ath Party. Hammadi is credited for introducing Ba'athism in Iraq. He rose to prominence after it seized power in Iraq in 1968. Earlier, he served as the Minister for Agrarian Reform and head of Iraq National Oil Company. As the Minister of Oil, he oversaw the nationalization of oil in 1972. In 1974, Hammadi became Iraq's foreign minister, a position he held until 1983, thus surviving Saddam's takeover of power in 1979. As foreign minister, Hammadi made state visits to numerous countries and represented Iraq. He also attended various summits with Saddam.

He was briefly the prime minister of Iraq succeeding Saddam from March until September 1991. Saddam had previously been prime minister in addition to being president, but Hammadi was forced out due to his reformist views and was made the Speaker and President of the National Assembly in 1996. He continued to be in that position until the invasion of Iraq. Shortly before the beginning of the war, Hammadi rejected the ultimatum given by U.S President George W. Bush to Saddam. Following the invasion by the U.S-led coalition, he was arrested by the American forces and was kept in detention for several months. After being released, Hammadi left for Lebanon and settled in Qatar, where he worked at a cultural center in Doha. Hammadi engaged in cultural and literary activities and wrote memoirs about his life and career. Due to ageing illness, he died at a hospital in Germany on 14 March 2007, at the age of 76 and his funeral was held in Qatar.

Hammadi was a prominent Shi'ite politician in the government of the Ba'ath Party. He earned a doctorate from an American university and was also involved in cultural activities. He was among the more widely published Iraqi Ba'ath Party leaders.

== Early life ==
Hammadi was born in Karbala on 22 June 1930, as a Shi'ite Muslim. He obtained a Master's Degree in economics from the American University of Beirut. In addition, he earned a PhD. in economics from the University of Wisconsin–Madison in 1956. Hammadi joined the Ba'ath Party in 1949. He was believed to be first Iraqi member of the Ba'ath Party, who introduced Ba'athism in Iraq.

Hammadi said in his memoirs: "My years of study in Lebanon were the beginning of my exposure to what was outside my birthplace. I saw a new Arab country, and I contacted Arabs outside Iraq. In it, my political thinking crystallized, and the progressive nationalist trend settled within me. That was an opportunity to see some of the beauty of nature," He added. "I lived in a university environment that was different from what we were used to, a mixed environment where women were present. I witnessed this with emotion, and the feelings of youth blossomed in me".

== 14 July Revolution ==
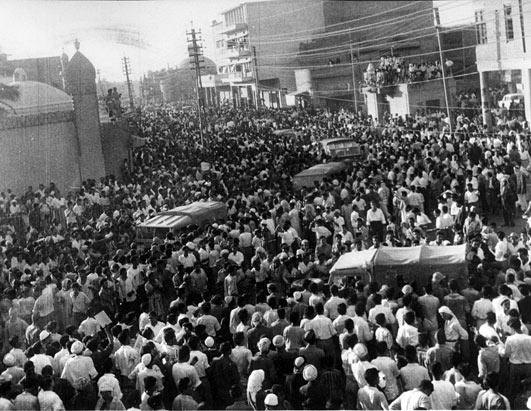
14 July Revolution scenes in Baghdad, 1958

One of Hammadi's early party missions took place in Syria, which was caught in a whirlwind of internal tensions after several years of successive coups. A significant event in 1958 was the declaration of the United Arab Republic, a union between Egypt and Syria, with Abdel Nasser and Shukri al-Quwatli signing the charter. However, unity was not easily achieved, as Gamal Abdel Nasser insisted on the dissolution of Syrian parties, a condition that was disappointing to the Baathists. In response, the Iraqi Baath leadership sent Hammadi to Damascus with a mission to persuade the Syrian Baath Party of the dangers of dissolving their party, but the mission ultimately failed.

In his memoirs, Hammadi wrote:

"I traveled to Damascus via Beirut and attended a leadership meeting with Michel Aflaq, Salah al-Din al-Bitar, and Akram al-Hourani. I explained my mission, but the discussion remained inconclusive. No definitive answer was given as to why the party had been dissolved in Syria. It was a typical meeting—lots of debate but no clear decision."

He added:

"Within the Iraqi branch of the party, there was no support for dissolving the party in Syria. However, members remained silent because the decision came from the highest leadership and was seen as the price of achieving unity."

In the months following the unity between Egypt and Syria, on July 14, 1958, news of the revolution led by a group of Iraqi officers reached Baghdad. The monarchy was overthrown, and the Iraqi Republic was established, accompanied by a massacre of the royal family. Two days after the revolution, Hammadi took over the management of Al-Shaab newspaper, which had been published during the monarchy, and re-launched it under the new name Al-Jumhuriya.

Taher Kanaan explained: "The communists were not openly against unity. They claimed to support a federal rather than a full union. However, this was merely a deceptive tactic."

However, a dispute soon arose among the officers, eventually leading to a division of power into two factions: a nationalist wing, led by Abdul Salam Arif, and a faction supported by the communist parties, headed by Abdul Karim Qasim. The central issue of the dispute was the question of unity with the United Arab Republic. Arif and his nationalist supporters, including the Baathists, advocated for unity with Egypt, while Qasim and the Communist Party pushed for Iraqi independence and sought to consolidate power for themselves.

=== Imprisonment and Exile ===
Following the revolution, Hammadi left Iraq for Libya to work in the research department of the National Bank of Libya. While in Libya, he secretly worked to establish a Ba'athist organization, but a political statement calling for democracy, the expulsion of foreign forces, and Arab unity led to his arrest and imprisonment for a year. Upon his release, he returned to Iraq but was arrested upon arrival due to escalating tensions between Arif and Qasim. The Iraqi prisons at that time were filled with Ba'athists, communists, and Kurdish activists.

=== Qasim and Aref ===
In his writings, Hammadi provides insights into prominent Iraqi political figures, including Abdul Karim Qasim and Abdul Salam Arif. Qasim, an officer who became the president of the Iraqi Free Officers Movement in 1957 and later the prime minister following the 1958 coup, is described by Hammadi as an "eccentric" individual. Hammadi notes that Qasim's primary concern was to maintain power at all costs. In pursuit of this goal, Qasim adopted a violent approach to governance, and the inevitable clash between him and Abdul Salam Arif was only a matter of time.

Amid the political turbulence in Iraq and Syria, Hammadi chose to travel to Libya, where he began working in the research department of the National Bank of Libya. While in Libya, he secretly began organizing the Baath Party. The group issued a statement entitled "Democracy, evacuation, and Arab unity are the goals of the people," which was secretly distributed on the anniversary of Libyan independence. However, the distribution of this statement led to the exposure of the organization, and Hammadi and other members of the group were arrested. They were charged with attempting a coup, and Hammadi was sentenced to one year in prison.

Hammadi recalls that the conditions of his detention in Libya were regulated by law. Their place of detention was known, visits were permitted, and minimum legal standards were adhered to. He contrasts this with the practices of the Syrian regime, which imprisoned opponents without trial for over twenty years. Hammadi criticizes the Syrian regime's handling of its prisoners, though he refrains from commenting directly on the brutalities of Iraqi prisons. After being released from prison in Tripoli, Hammadi was arrested again upon his return to Baghdad, where an arrest warrant had been issued due to the escalating political tensions between Abdul Karim Qasim and Abdul Salam Arif. At this time, Iraqi prisons were filled with Baathists, communists, and Kurds.

== 1963 coup ==
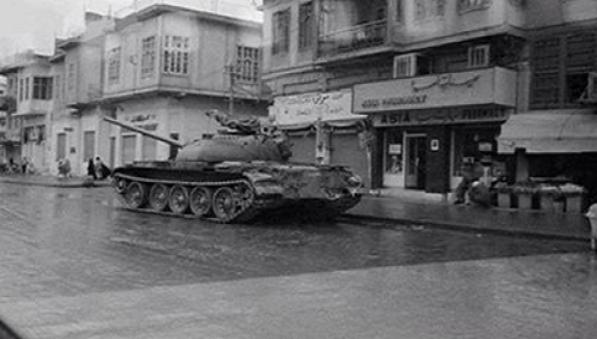
A scene of Baghdad's Bataween district during the 1968 revolution that brought the Ba'ath Party to power in Iraq

On February 8, 1963, a bloody coup took place in Iraq, resulting in the overthrow of Abdul Karim Qasim. In the aftermath of this coup, Sa'dun Hammadi was released from prison and appointed as Minister of Agriculture. Hammadi's release and rise to power mirrored the story of Fathi Radwan, an activist in the National Party in Egypt, who was also released from prison and flown by military plane to become one of the prominent figures of the new era following Egypt's July Revolution.

=== Minister of Agriculture ===
Hammadi recalled witnessing the dramatic end of Iraqi President Abdul Karim Qasim. Brought to the leadership headquarters alongside Fadhil al-Mahdawi, Qasim appeared remarkably composed despite the gravity of the moment. Shortly after their arrival, the newly empowered President, Abdul Salam Arif, assembled the members of the National Council for the Leadership of the Revolution and issued a brief, decisive command: "Execution for all of them."

Gunfire erupted moments later. When Hammadi entered the room shortly after the shooting ceased, the air was thick with gunsmoke, leaving Qasim, al-Mahdawi, and the accompanying officers dead in their chairs. Among the overwhelming details of the scene, one moment remained permanently etched in Hammadi's memory: Qasim’s wristwatch was brought into the room and placed before Arif, who casually handed it to a nearby soldier as part of the afternoon’s spoils.

That evening, prison authorities unexpectedly informed Hammadi of his release. A military vehicle transported him directly to the radio station—the headquarters of the new regime—and by the following morning, he was appointed Minister of Agriculture, a sudden turn of events that came as a complete surprise.

=== Internal disputes ===
Months after Arif assumed power, a dispute between him and the Ba'athists emerged, leading to the Ba'athists being overthrown from power, with many imprisoned. The Ba'ath Party was even banned from political activities. In his memoirs, Hammadi criticizes Arif's regime, labeling some of his decisions as "reckless and naive." Hammadi describes Arif as an "opportunist in his nationalism and religiousness, and even in his relationship with the Ba'ath Party and Abdel Nasser." Sa'dun Hammadi became a target of Arif's persecution, which led to his dismissal from managing the "Al-Jumhuriya" newspaper and an arrest order against him. As a result, Hammadi fled Iraq for Syria, but the situation in Damascus was not much better, as he continued to face persecution and pressure.

== Ba'ath Party: 1968–1979 ==
Hammadi returned to Baghdad without a job or position. He wrote a letter to Ahmed Hassan al-Bakr, who became President of Iraq, and Hammadi returned to work again in the state through the Ministry of Oil.

=== Oil industry ===
In 1968, Sa'dun Hammadi met Saddam Hussein, who was then the Vice President of the Revolutionary Command Council, near the Sarafiya Bridge. During this encounter, Saddam Hussein offered Hammadi the position of Chairman of the National Oil Company, which Hammadi accepted on November 15, 1968. Two years later, in 1970, Hammadi became Iraq's Minister of Oil. His tenure coincided with the emergence of the Organization of the Petroleum Exporting Countries (OPEC), a period marked by intensifying conflicts with international oil companies, the nationalization of the oil industry, and the oil crisis. Under Hammadi's leadership, Iraq took the historic decision to nationalize its oil industry, a move Hammadi credits to Saddam Hussein. However, Jawad Hashim's memoirs suggest that Hammadi was initially hesitant about this decision to nationalize the oil industry.

== Foreign Minister ==
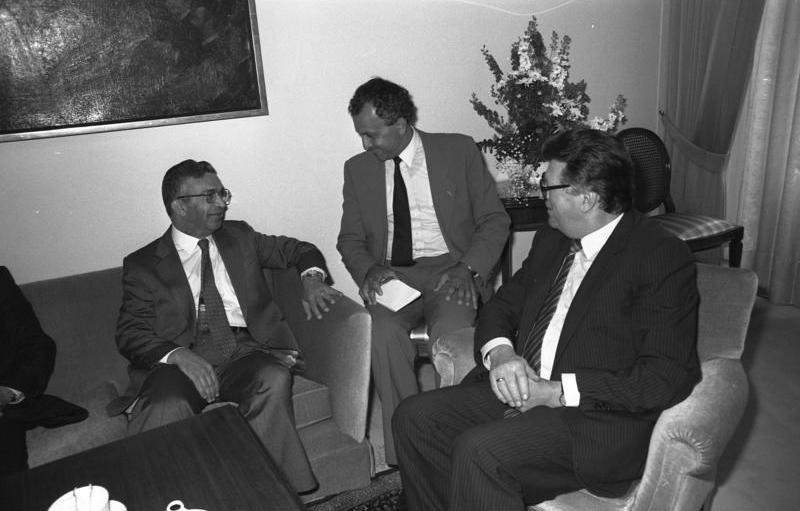
Hammadi with Philipp Jenninger in Bonn, Germany, 1987

One of the most significant roles Sa'dun Hammadi held was as Iraq's Foreign Minister, a position he served in from 1974 for eight years. Among the notable events during this period was a secret meeting with U.S. Secretary of State Henry Kissinger in France on December 17, 1975. Hammadi's impressions of Kissinger were that he primarily worked in the interests of Israel, and that he was not truthful when justifying American support for the Kurdish rebellion in northern Iraq, claiming that Iraq was a state affiliated with the Soviet Union. Hammadi believed Kissinger's true aim was to soften Iraq's position and align it with the appeased Arab regimes. Hammadi described Kissinger as "gentle with his words," but ultimately evasive and with "an impure heart."

On 14 January 1975, Sa'dun made a trip to Kuwait and met Sabah Al-Ahmad Al-Jaber Al-Sabah. During his visit, Sa'dun discussed about the cooperation between Iraq and Kuwait. However, the meeting did not mentioned about border issues.

Hammadi also recalled the extravagance during the reign of the Shah of Iran, describing meals at tables made entirely of pure gold. He recalled, "I will never forget that I ate with the Shah twice at a table where all the utensils and accessories were made of pure gold, except for the knife blades. The Venezuelan Minister of Oil at the time was sitting next to me, so he lifted up an ashtray and read on the back that the gold it was made of was 24 karat."

=== Under Saddam Hussein ===
When Saddam Hussein came to power in 1979, significant changes occurred in Iraq. He consolidated his grip on the country, ending the collective leadership of the Ba'ath Party and replacing it with a more centralized, symbolic leadership under himself. Saddam's long and exhausting war with Iran, which lasted for eight years, left the country in a dire economic state. In response to this situation, Hammadi, in his memoirs, recounts suggesting to Saddam that he undertake a diplomatic tour of the Gulf states to secure financial assistance for Iraq. Although Saddam was initially reluctant, he eventually agreed to the plan.

Hammadi's trip began in the United Arab Emirates, where he met with Sheikh Zayed, the president of the UAE. Hammadi explained Iraq's financial difficulties, and Sheikh Zayed expressed sympathy and willingness to help. However, the Sheikh pointed out that any assistance from the Gulf states would require Saudi approval first. Hammadi noted that previous assistance had caused issues, as it was provided without Saudi consent.

=== Chemical weapons ===
Hammadi's experience can be summarized as one of criticism in a low voice, despite his lack of concern for democracy. Although Hammadi witnessed many important and sensitive political issues, he chose to remain silent about them in his memoirs. The book Saddam Hussein's Tapes reveals how a special unit of the US Army conducted a mission in Baghdad, aiming to search for evidence or documents that could justify the war by proving Iraq's possession of weapons of mass destruction. During that mission, US forces uncovered a dangerous archive: thousands of hours of secret recordings of meetings and communications between Saddam Hussein and his entourage, members of the Baath Party, the Revolutionary Command Council, and senior officers in his army. Upon reviewing the book, which included the Baath Party's private meeting records, Hammadi's name appeared among the files discovered by the US forces.

An example of Hammadi's speech can be found outside the silence of his memoirs. Hammadi attended many significant meetings, and in all of them, his positions were in support of Saddam Hussein, discussed only within the limits of what was permissible. One example is a meeting in March 1987, where Baath Party members deliberated on the use of chemical weapons against Iranian soldiers and civilians. During this meeting, Saadoun Hammadi asked Saddam Hussein: "I have a military question. Are chemical weapons as effective as we think, I mean, the way we think as civilians?" Saddam Hussein responded, "Yes, they kill thousands... they kill thousands and restrict them from drinking or eating the available food, and prevent them from leaving the city for a period of time until it is completely cleansed of contamination. Nothing... He cannot sleep on a bed or eat or drink or anything."

Hammadi's memoirs do not mention his opinion of Egyptian President Hosni Mubarak, but Saddam's response to Hammadi's remark about Mubarak was that he was "not chivalrous, but rather despicable and not a leader of the Arabs." In a separate discussion about military strategy in the Iran-Iraq War, Saadoun suggested that economic targets should be bombed intensively. He said, "If they bomb our cities with bombs, as is happening now, we must respond to them in an appropriate manner. And if we want to increase our bombing of them, I mean that the increase should be directed at economic targets." Hammadi even encouraged the use of chemical weapons in these military discussions with Saddam. All of this information was revealed through the secret tapes the Americans discovered after 2003. In contrast, Hammadi's cold memoirs remained silent about his political roles, his encouragement of the invasion of Kuwait, and his exaggerations regarding Iraq's military capabilities. Of course, Hammadi's memoirs do not mention his true role in the Gulf War. This is often the issue with Arab memoirs: they conceal the sensitive, important, and dangerous parts through silence.

== Prime Minister ==
On August 2, 1990, Iraqi forces invaded Kuwait. By 1991, with increasing pressure and a siege on Iraq, Saddam appointed Hammadi as the Prime Minister of Iraq. Hammadi took office as Prime Minister at a difficult time, with the Iraqi economy deeply impacted by the ongoing wars. During this period, Hammadi faced severe criticism from Saddam Hussein's inner circle, particularly from Hussein Kamel, the husband of Saddam's daughter Raghad. At a Qatari conference, Kamel accused Hammadi of being responsible for Iraq's economic woes, telling him, "Your PhD in economics will not be able to solve them."

In his memoirs, Hammadi reflected on the hostility from certain figures in the presidential entourage, remarking, "It became clear to me that some of them did not have any affection for me." He explained that he was falsely accused of having undue personal influence over his visits to Iraqi regions. The harsh criticism was spearheaded by Hussein Kamel and Sabawi Ibrahim al-Hassan. Hammadi recalls that Hussein Kamel, a figure he had not previously known, was a recent addition to the scene. Kamel was not recognized for his work as a Baathist fighter, but rather for his rise through the ranks, attributed to his loyalty to Saddam and his ability to execute orders. This marked for Hammadi the moment when "the revolution began to eat away at its fighters." Hammadi went home bitter about the rise of newcomers within the party ranks.

Following his dismissal from the ministry, Hammadi's life began to change. He observed how those around him, including flatterers, quickly left after his fall from power. He was reminded of the experience of writer Ahmed Amin, who, upon reaching retirement age, saw those who once followed him disperse, leaving his mailbox empty except for a few holiday cards. Hammadi's reflections on his own experience mirrored this sense of isolation after leaving office, revealing the personal cost of political power and the meanness of those who abandon former leaders once their utility has passed. Al-Qassab echoed this sentiment, accusing Hussein Kamel of betraying Iraq, looting, and ultimately fleeing the country.

== National Assembly of Iraq ==
Hammadi played a key role in Iraq's political response to United Nations Security Council Resolutions (UNSCR) 1115 and 1134, which sought to enforce UN Special Commission (UNSCOM) inspections of Iraq's suspected weapons of mass destruction (WMD) programs. Following the passage of UNSCR 1134 on October 23, 1997, Hammadi convened an emergency session of the Iraqi parliament on October 25–26. The assembly affirmed Iraq's stance against UNSCOM inspections and reiterated claims that Iraq had already disarmed by 1992. Hammadi then presented a report with the assembly's recommendations to the Revolutionary Command Council (RCC) on October 28.

The following day, after consultations with the Ba'ath Party leadership, the RCC issued a statement announcing Iraq's intent to expel American UNSCOM inspectors within a week. This decision marked a turning point in Iraq's defiance of UN disarmament efforts, leading to increased tensions between Baghdad and Washington. Hammadi's role in these proceedings emphasized Iraq's official rejection of U.S. and UN policies, framing them as attempts to prolong economic sanctions and infringe on Iraqi sovereignty.

On May 5, 2000, Hammadi met with Blas F. Ople, the Philippine Senate President Pro Tempore, in Baghdad before Ople attended the Inter-Parliamentary Union conference in Amman. Hammadi assured the Philippine government that Iraq did not support separatist movements attempting to destabilize the Philippines. Ople stated that Iraqi officials had expressed concern over the conflict in Mindanao, particularly the clashes between the Philippine Armed Forces, the Abu Sayyaf group, and the Moro Islamic Liberation Front (MILF). He also noted that Iraq opposed any MILF efforts to escalate violence against civilians. Additionally, Ople indicated his inclination to support a review of sanctions against Iraq for humanitarian reasons.

On November 12, 2002, Hammadi, announced the unanimous rejection of United Nations Security Council Resolution 1441, which demanded Iraq's disarmament and cooperation with weapons inspections. Despite the parliamentary vote, the final decision rested with Saddam, who had three days to respond or face "serious consequences." Hammadi addressed reporters in Baghdad, reaffirming Iraq's stance against foreign pressure. He presided over a special session to discuss United Nations Security Council Resolution 1441, which demanded Iraq's disarmament. The parliament unanimously rejected the resolution, but the final decision remained with Saddam. Hammadi was photographed taking his place at the session and later addressed reporters, reaffirming Iraq's stance against foreign pressure.

In the lead-up to the 2003 invasion of Iraq, Hammadi, played a prominent role in rejecting U.S. President George W. Bush's ultimatum for Saddam Hussein to leave the country. On March 19, 2003, during an emergency parliamentary session, he declared it "unthinkable" that Saddam would comply with the U.S. demands, reaffirming Iraq's defiance against foreign intervention. The parliament's rejection came just hours before the U.S.-led coalition launched military operations against Iraq. Despite the firm stance taken by Hammadi and other Iraqi officials, the U.S. invasion proceeded, citing Iraq's alleged weapons of mass destruction (WMDs) as justification. Hammadi remained in Iraq during the initial phase of the war but, like other high-ranking Ba'ath Party officials, he was sidelined after the fall of Baghdad in April 2003.

== Hammadi and unspoken files ==
In his memoirs, Saadoun expressed his understanding of nationalism, which made it taboo to stand with a foreigner against his homeland. He shared this story in his memoirs to illustrate his viewpoint: "What my memory holds is that the former Iranian president, Abu al-Hassan Bani Sadr, rebelled against Khomeini's rule and sought refuge in France. This was after the war between us and Iran had begun. Our Iraqi intelligence tried to convince him to give us military information about the Iranian army, but he refused and did not cooperate. This was a source of my appreciation…" In another instance, after the war ended, Hammadi was in Washington, where he held a press conference at the Iraqi embassy. Following the conference, he was contacted by former Iranian Finance Minister, Jamshid Amozgar, who had served during the Shah's reign and was living in the United States. Hammadi had known him from his time with OPEC, where the Finance Minister was responsible for oil in Iran.

Amozgar telephoned Hammadi in a friendly, gloating tone, relieved and celebrating Iran's defeat by Iraq, while congratulating Hammadi on the victory. Although Hammadi welcomed the call, he could not respect Amozgar in his heart. He believed that Amozgar's animosity toward the Khomeini regime, which had overthrown the Shah's government, took precedence over his loyalty to Iran, which had been defeated in the war. This story reflected Hammadi's view on politics in Iraq—where it was not permissible to seek assistance from enemies, as evidenced by Iraq's alliance with the United States.

Hammadi's memoirs offered a detailed reading of a crucial phase in Iraq's history, but they also avoided many significant events. Despite his proximity to the Baath Party leadership and Saddam Hussein, Hammadi did not devote enough space in his memoirs to discussing Saddam's personality or his management of the Iraqi state, especially in key events. The memoirs did not address the Al-Khald Hall incident, which marked the beginning of Saddam's rule with a horrific massacre, nor did they examine the Baath Party's political phase in depth. Instead, the memoirs focused on bold actions, such as the attack on Abdul Karim Qasim and Abdul Salam Aref. Regarding the Baath period, Hammadi did not delve into its experience and placed the blame solely on Hussein Kamel, who caused Hammadi's dismissal from his position.

Hammadi reflected on the memoirs of the Iraqi-American administrator Paul Bremer and critiqued the corruption of the post-invasion administration, sectarianism, and flaws in the post-American invasion period. However, Hammadi did not offer similarly powerful assessments of the periods when he was at the head of the Iraqi Foreign Ministry. He remained silent about his roles in Iraq's political ventures, such as the Iran-Iraq War or the Gulf War.

Hammadi justified his silence, stating: "I did not write down everything I considered important, as there was something left that I kept to myself, because not everything that is known should be said. If I must say something about that, it is that my motive for concealing it was the public interest, as I imagined, and I hoped that I was right in what I went to." The issue of democracy or freedoms was not a central concern for Hammadi in his political career. He noted in his memoirs: "It must be noted, in the service of truth, that the issue of democracy was not my only concern, but rather the national issue was the important obsession for me. I have always valued discipline and respect for order to a great extent since I was young. Therefore, I was keen for criticism to be in a low voice and to take into account the surrounding dangers, focusing on the most important danger first."

== Cultural activities ==
Hammadi stood out among other Iraqis in the party leadership due to his doctorate from an American university and his cultural activities. He was one of the most intellectually productive Iraqi Baathist leaders, and he devoted significant attention to his cultural contributions in his memoirs. Hammadi considered his work in collecting and publishing Michel Aflaq's articles under the title For the Sake of Baathism to be one of his most important cultural achievements. He also played a key role in establishing Arab Studies magazine with Bashir al-Daouq, contributed to the creation of the Center for Arab Unity Studies, and published numerous studies and books on nationalism.

Hammadi met several prominent Iraqi writers, including Badr Shakir al-Sayyab, whom he described as living in poverty and deeply attached to the simple environment of Basra. He also encountered poet Nazik al-Malaika in the United States. However, his meeting with the poet Muhammad Mahdi al-Jawahiri left a lasting impression. Hammadi described al-Jawahiri as a "talented person who emerged from the traditional environment of Najaf, turbaned in cultural tradition, without a university degree, and perhaps became the greatest traditional poet of the modern Arab era."

Hammadi first met al-Jawahiri at a ceremony in Karbala Intermediate School during his final year of study. Though he arrived late, Hammadi recited a selection of his own poems, which were warmly received. Later, Hammadi met al-Jawahiri again during a visit to Czechoslovakia (as it was known at the time) with an oil delegation led by Saleh Mahdi Ammash. At the time, Hammadi was serving as the Minister of Oil. Al-Jawahiri, who was residing in Czechoslovakia, often joined their gatherings. Ammash, who shared poetic inclinations, would meet al-Jawahiri in a café, and the evenings would often be filled with poetic discussions, including soft flirtations with a young working girl who served them. The conversations would turn into poems that were later published.

Hammadi's interactions with al-Jawahiri continued in Baghdad during an official event at the Republican Palace, where he observed al-Jawahiri intoxicated and smoking. It was at this point that Hammadi learned of al-Jawahiri's estrangement from Iraq. Through Shafiq Al-Kamali, who had published al-Jawahiri's complete works, Hammadi discovered that Iraq had officially invited the poet to mend the rift, which al-Jawahiri initially accepted. However, upon arriving at the Iraqi border, al-Jawahiri returned to Damascus, disillusioned by the modest reception he received. He eventually went on to praise the King of Jordan in a poem that began: "Oh my lord, help my mouth to say on your beautiful birthday, beautiful."

Later, al-Jawahiri traveled to Morocco and praised King Hassan II, but he left behind the gifts he had been given by the Moroccan king, showing little regard for them, much as he had with the land offered to him by the Iraqi monarchy. Hammadi described al-Jawahiri as a person who was "proficient in the Arabic language, very worldly, loved its pleasures, adored glory, and longed to be the second al-Mutanabbi." He added that al-Jawahiri was emotional and deeply influenced by his surroundings, which led him to be contradictory. He was not a steadfast fighter nor a patriot with unwavering principles; instead, he was moved by the events around him, responding with national feelings when the circumstances motivated him.

== Post-2003 and later life ==
=== 2003 invasion of Iraq ===
In 2003, U.S. forces, supported by international troops, invaded Iraq. After three weeks of intense fighting, Baghdad fell on April 9, 2003. This moment was marked by the iconic toppling of Saddam Hussein's statue in Al-Firdos Square. Hammadi reflects on this period with great sorrow, emphasizing the widespread destruction and looting, and how the U.S. aimed to divide Iraq into sects that would fight each other. The most significant part of his testimony, however, is his experience in the infamous Abu Ghraib prison. Hammadi recalls: "I had about four interrogation sessions with military intelligence officers. The questions revolved around the ruling regime, its people, political analyses, and questions like how, why, when, who, etc. My response was that I had not been in the inner circle of the state for a long time, and I did not have any special information. The interrogator said to me: 'If you change your mind, you can contact me.' I told him: 'I don't think so.' He said to me: 'Then you will remain in this hole.''' Hammadi was later imprisoned at a prison camp in Iraq after the invasion. In February 2004, after nine months in the custody of the Americans, he was released and subsequently resettled in Qatar while seeking medical treatment abroad.

=== Life in Qatar ===
After spending nine months in prison, Saadoun was released but forced to leave Iraq for Jordan, without a job or income. He moved to Beirut, and eventually, Doha became his final destination. In Doha, he began writing post-occupation blogs and reflecting on the political system in post-invasion Iraq. His memoirs reveal his financial struggles during his last years, which highlights his integrity and lack of involvement in financial corruption. Hammadi praised Sheikh Hamad bin Khalifa Al Thani, the Emir of Qatar, for his role in hosting him, describing him as: "I am an open-minded patriot, a lover of goodness, and I love work and I want to advance Qatar and help the Arab countries." During a meeting with Sheikh Hamad, Hammadi made a statement: "I will not abandon what is known about me," referring to his Baathist affiliation. Sheikh Khalifa responded, "Yes, otherwise people will not respect you." Hammadi also commended the Amiri Diwan building in Doha, noting its beauty, good standards, and balance. He first visited the building during his tenure as Minister of Foreign Affairs, when he toured to garner support for Iraq after the war with Iran. The historical irony was that Hamadi visited Doha and settled there after the Baath Party had fallen from power.

=== Death and funeral ===
He died in a German hospital from liver cancer on 14 March 2007. At his funeral (janazah) in Doha, his body was wrapped in the Ba'athist Iraqi flag.

== Personal life ==
He married twice during his life, the first time to the Al-Kayali family, which is of Libyan–Palestinian origin, and the second time to one of his relatives in Karbala. He has five children, all of whom are males: Osama, Suhail, Wael, Mazen, and Ghassan. He was known for not liking to mediate for anyone, so none of his relatives were in power. He was also known for being extremely loyal to his friends outside the Baath Party, such as Dr. Fawzi Al-Qaisi and Dr. Abdul Razzaq Al-Ubaidi, the lawyer.

== See also ==
- Saddam Hussein
- Muhammad Saeed al-Sahhaf

Political offices
Preceded by Saddam Hussein	Prime Minister of Iraq; 1991	Succeeded by Mohammed Hamza Zubeidi
