= Murtada Said Abdel Baki al-Hadithi =

70th Iraqi Minister of Foreign Affairs

Murtada Said Abdel Baki al-Hadithi (Arabic: مرتضى سعيد عبد الباقي الحديثي; 1941 – 1 June 1980), was an Iraqi politician, diplomat and minister. Al-Hadithi served as Minister of Foreign Affairs from 31 October 1971 to 23 June 1974.

== Biography ==
Al-Hadithi was born in 1941 in Haditha, Al Anbar Governorate, a small town located northwest of Baghdad. Al-Hadithi finished his elementary school in Haditha and moved to Ramadi for his higher school. Al-Hadithi finished studying College of Education for Department of Mathematics in Baghdad in 1965.

== Politician Life ==
Al-Hadithi was member of Ba'ath Party from 1954, after Ba'athism had taken over power in Iraq on 17 July 1968; Al-Hadithi got many important positions in government. Al-Hadithi was Minister of Works and Economy from March in 1970 to 24 October 1971, minister of Foreign Affairs from 1971 to 1974 and ambassador in the Soviet Union and Spain.

== Death ==
Al-Hadithi was arrested in Baghdad after he had come back from Madrid during operations of Ba'ath Party Purge in July 1979 and assassinated in prison by Iraqi security forces on June 1, 1980 in Baghdad.

Political offices
Preceded by Abdul Karim al-Shaikhly	Minister for Foreign Affairs; 1971–1974	Succeeded by Shathel Taqa
