= Ahmad Husayn Khudayir as-Samarrai =

Prime minister of Iraq from 1993 to 1994

Ahmed Husayn Khudayir as-Samarrai
- أَحْمَد حُسَيْن خُضَيْر السَّامَرَّائِيّ
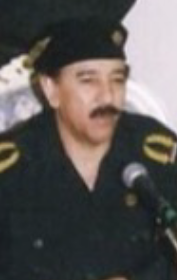

Prime Minister of Iraq
- In office September 5, 1993 – April 9, 1994
- President: Saddam Hussein
- Preceded by: Mohammed Hamza Zubeidi
- Succeeded by: Saddam Hussein

Personal details
- Born: 2 July 1941 (age 84) Samarra, Kingdom of Iraq

Ahmed Husayn Khudayir as-Samarrai (Arabic: أَحْمَد حُسَيْن خُضَيْر السَّامَرَّائِيّ; born 2 July 1941) was Prime Minister of Iraq from 1993 to 1994, during the rule of President Saddam Hussein. He was Minister of Finance from July 1992 to May 1994.

Samarrai maintained the position of chief of the general staff over the years, and was his last position in the presidency office until 2003, post American invasion.

He surrendered to the U.S. forces during the 2003 invasion of Iraq. Later on, he was sentenced in 2006 to 6 years in prison.

== Biography ==
Ahmed Husayn Khudayir as-Samarrai holds a Bachelor of Laws degree.

== Career ==
He was Minister of Youth 1982-1983 in the government headed by Saddam Hussein, president of the Republic (1984 - 1991), Minister of Finance (March 1991 - September 1991), Minister of Foreign Affairs - succeeding Tariq Aziz - (September 1991 - July 1992) in the government of Muhammad Hamza al-Zubaidi, Minister of Finance (July 1992 - September 1993) in the government of Mohammed Hamza Al-Zubaid, and Prime Minister of Iraq from 1993 to 1994.

He was chosen for the second time as head of the Presidency of the Republic from 1995 until the American occupation forces entered Baghdad in 2003. He was sentenced to life imprisonment and remains in captivity.

Political offices
Preceded by Mohammed Hamza Zubeidi	Prime Minister of Iraq; 1993–1994	Succeeded by Saddam Hussein
