= Abdul Karim al-Shaikhly =

68th Iraqi Minister of Foreign Affairs

Abdul Karim al-Shaikhly (Arabic: عبدالكريم الشيخلي; April 28, 1937 – April 8, 1980) was an Iraqi politician, diplomat and minister.

== Biography ==
Al-Shaikhly was born on April 28, 1937. Coming from an aristocratic family, he was a cousin and classmate of Saddam Hussein and it is believed Saddam used his birthday as his own. Hussein escaped prison with him in 1964.

Shaikhly founded Jihaz Haneen, a paramilitary organization run by Hussein until President Abdul Rahman Arif was overthrown in the 17 July Revolution of 1968.

Al-Shaikhly served as Minister of Foreign Affairs from 31 July 1968 to 29 September 1971, and as Iraq's Permanent Representative to the United Nations from 1972 to 1974.

Shaikhly was recalled to Baghdad in late 1978. Upon his arrival, he was arrested and prosecuted for criticising Saddam Hussein's government while he was in New York, and sentenced to six years in prison but released a year later. Within weeks, on April 8, 1980, he was assassinated while visiting a post office by two members of the Iraqi Intelligence Service on Hussein's order.

Political offices
Preceded by Nasser al-Hani	Minister for Foreign Affairs; 1968–1971	Succeeded by Murtada Said Abdel Baki al-Hadithi
