= Grand Mosque of Bandung =

Mosque in Bandung, West Java, Indonesia

- Masjid Raya Bandung ᮙᮞ᮪ᮏᮤᮓ᮪ ᮛᮚ ᮘᮔ᮪ᮓᮥᮀ
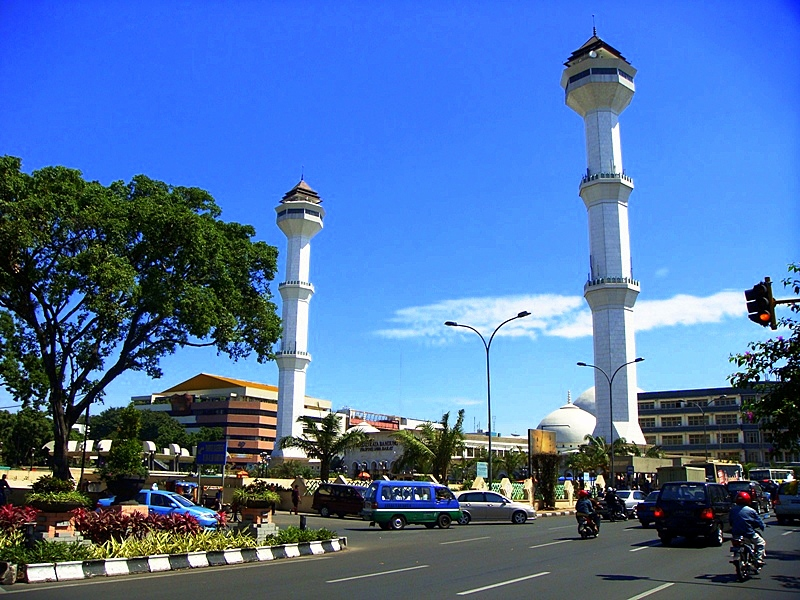

Religion
- Affiliation: Islam
- Branch/tradition: Sunni
- Province: West Java
- Ecclesiastical or organisational status: Provincial mosque
- Status: Active

Location
- Location: Bandung, Indonesia
- Interactive map of Grand Mosque of Bandung
- Coordinates: 6.921734°S 107.606259°E

Architecture
- Type: Mosque
- Groundbreaking: February 25, 2001
- Completed: June 4, 2003

Specifications
- Capacity: 13,000 people
- Dome: 3
- Minaret: 2
- Minaret height: 81 metres (266 ft)

The Grand Mosque of Bandung (Indonesian: Masjid Raya Bandung), previously known as the Great Mosque of Bandung (Masjid Agung Bandung), is a mosque in Bandung, the a provincial capital of West Java, Indonesia. The mosque received the status of provincial mosque in West Java Province in 2004. It is located on the east side of the alun-alun of Bandung.

== History ==
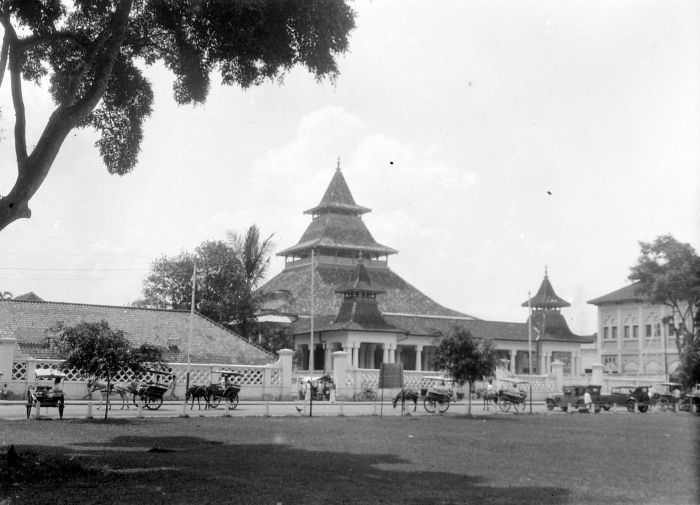
The mosque after receiving its first front gallery and fish-scale patterned fence.

The Grand Mosque of Bandung, previously the Great Mosque of Bandung, was first constructed in 1812. The first building was a humble wooden structure on a raised platform and covered in bamboo weave wall and multi-tiered thatched roof. A large pool in the mosque complex provided water for the ablution ritual before performing prayer.

In 1826, the mosque was gradually renovated, the roof was refurbished, and the bamboo weave wall was replaced with sturdier wood. In 1850, with the construction of the Great Post Road (Grote Postweg, now Jalan Asia Afrika), the mosque was renovated and expanded; the roof was replaced with clay tiles, and the wall was replaced with solid bricks. The pyramidal multi-tiered roof gave the mosque a nickname bale nyungcung (Sundanese for "spiky pavilion"). In 1875, the mosque base was replaced with solid stone, and the perimeter of the mosque complex was enclosed with a new brick wall with fish-scale pattern; a traditional pattern associated with Bandung which was also found in the walls surrounding the Pendopo complex of Bandung. In 1900, the main prayer hall received an expansion in form of covered porch (pawestren) to the south and north of the main prayer hall.

In 1930, the covered front porch (serambi) of the Great Mosque was refurbished following the design of Henri Maclaine Pont. Two-tiered roofs, mimicking the main prayer's hall three-tiered roof, were added to the left and right of the mosque's facade.

In 1955, the year of the Asia-Africa Conference, the mosque received its first major renovation. In order to accommodate the guests of the Asia-Africa Conference, the mosque was greatly expanded, reducing its original courtyard into a narrow space. As a result, the original 19th-century multi-tiered roofs, the pawestren, and the two-tiered serambi were demolished. The traditional Javanese multi-tiered roof was replaced with an onion-shaped mosque designed by President Sukarno himself. In 1967, strong gale damaged this new dome. In 1970, the mosque received a new hip roof.

In 1971, the Governor of West Java decided to expand the mosque yet again. Construction began in 1972 and was completed on October 1, 1973. At this stage, the mosque received its first second floor and a basement for performing ritual ablution. The roof style is transformed into a joglo-style roof. The mosque also received a new cylindrical modern-style minaret and a bridge which connects the mosque with alun-alun. The overall look disturbs the facade of the mosque. During the 1980s, high solid wall and a steel entrance were added to the front of the mosque.

== Current mosque ==
Last major renovation occurred in 2001. Construction started on February 25, 2001 and was completed on June 4, 2003. The project was part of the rehabilitation of Bandung's alun-alun project, the overall project was completed on January 13, 2004. At this time, the mosque name was changed from "Great Mosque of Bandung" (Masjid Agung Bandung) to "Grand Mosque of Bandung" (Masjid Raya Bandung), elevating its status into a provincial mosque.

The new mosque design is the result of a collaboration between four native Bandung designers: Keulman, Arie Atmadibrata, Nu'man, and Slamet Wirasonjaya. The main circular dome (where the original roof stood) is 30 meter in diameter; two smaller domes flank the front facade of the mosque. A new west wing of the mosque is built on an area where the Alun-alun Barat Street used to be, merging the mosque with the alun-alun. The decision of removing the Alun-alun Barat Street results in an awkward urban design: the alun-alun design, normally surrounded by four streets, is now merged with the mosque; traffic diversion has to be adjusted with Banceuy Street and Dewi Sartika Street now disconnected; and Swarha Building, an Art Deco building whom facade was designed to be located on the corner of the road Alun-alun Barat Street and Asia-Afrika Street, is now awkwardly situated on one street.

The most distinctive feature of the mosque is its two twin minarets, each 81 meters high. The minarets were planned to be 99 meters high to represent the 99 names of Allah but was changed to 81 meters because of height restriction related with the position of Husein Sastranegara International Airport. The minarets flank the main building to the left and right. Both minarets are topped with a small roofed pavilion that mimics the original roof of the Great Mosque of Bandung. The top of the minarets are open to public every Saturday and Monday.

== See also ==
- List of mosques in Indonesia

== Works cited ==
- "Sejarah Masjid Raya Bandung" [The History of Bandung Grand Mosque]. masjidrayabandung.com (in Indonesian). Masjid Raya Bandung. 2015. Archived from the original on November 14, 2015.
- Sudarsono Katam; Lulus Abadi (2005). Album Bandoeng Tempo Doeloe [Past Time Bandung Album] (in Indonesian). NavPress Indonesia. ISBN 978-979-17710-9-2.
