= Yousef Ghanima =

Iraqi politician, journalist and historian

- يوسف غنيمة

Council of Representatives of Iraq
- In office 1925–1928
- Monarch: Faisal I of Iraq
- Constituency: Baghdad

Minister of Finance
- In office 1928–1929
- Monarch: Faisal I of Iraq
- Prime Minister: Abdul-Muhsin Al-Saadoun; Tawfiq al-Suwaidi
- Preceded by: Yasin al-Hashimi
- Succeeded by: Yasin al-Hashimi

Minister of Finance
- In office 1934–1935
- Monarch: Ghazi
- Prime Minister: Ali Jawdat al-Aiyubi; Jamil al-Midfai
- Preceded by: Naji al-Suwaydi
- Succeeded by: Rauf Al-Bahrani

Minister of Supply
- In office 1945–1946
- Monarch: Faisal II
- Prime Minister: Hamdi al-Pachachi
- Preceded by: Salih Jabr
- Succeeded by: Abdul Jabar Chalabi

Minister of Finance
- In office 1947–1948
- Monarch: Faisal II
- Prime Minister: Salih Jabr
- Preceded by: Sadek Al-Bassam
- Succeeded by: Abdul Elah Hafed

Personal details
- Born: Yousef Rizq Alah Ghanima; August 9, 1885 Baghdad, Ottoman Iraq
- Died: August 10, 1950 (aged 65) London, United Kingdom
- Resting place: Baghdad
- Citizenship: Iraqi, Ottoman
- Party: Party of National Brotherhood
- Profession: Politician, Historian, Journalist, Economist

Yousef Rizq Alah Ghanima (9 August 1885 - 10 August 1950) was an Iraqi politician, journalist and historian. He represented Christians at the time of Kingdom of Iraq, after which he was appointed to the Ministry of Finance six times, and the Ministry of Supply once. He is known for founding Seda Babel, one of the first newspapers in Iraq in 1908. He wrote many books about the history of Iraq.

== Early life ==
Ghanima was born in Baghdad to a Chaldean Catholic Assyrian family. He studied theology and Arabic literature by Anastase-Marie al-Karmali. He learned French and English in church. He joined the Committee of Union and Progress and became one of its first members in Baghdad.

== Career ==
After the British army entered Baghdad in March 1917, Ghanima was called by General Hooker along with other statesmen to found the city's municipal council. He welcomed King Faisal I after his arrival in Basra in 1921, and was appointed by the king for negotiation of the Anglo-Iraqi Treaty of 1922.

After the founding of the Council of Representatives of Iraq, from 1925 to 1928 he represented Christians of Baghdad. He became minister of finance at the third government of Abdul-Muhsin Al-Saadoun (1928 to 1929), first government of Tawfiq al-Suwaidi (1929), first government of Ali Jawdat al-Aiyubi (1934-1935), third government of Jamil al-Midfai (1935), first government of Arshad al-Umari (1946) and in the government of Salih Jabr (1947-1948).

He also become minister of supply in the government of Hamdi al-Pachachi (1945-1946). He was also appointed in many other positions in finance. He died on August 10, 1950, in London.

== Seda Babel ==
He founded the Seda Babel newspaper in 1908 with Dawud Sliwa. The newspaper was closed down in July 1914 before World War I by order from Nur Al-Deen Pasha, governor of Baghdad Vilayet.

== Books ==
- History of Iraqi trade (1922)
- History of Iraqi cities (1923)
- History of Iraqi jews (1924)

== See also ==
- Hanna Khayat
- Sassoon Eskell
