= Pachachi =

Pachachi (in written Arabic, Al-Bahjaji) is a surname. The Pachachi family are a prominenent Sunni Iraqi landowning family. Notable people with the surname include:

- Adnan Pachachi (1923–2019), Iraqi politician,
- Nadim al-pachachi (1914–1976), Iraqi politician,
- Hamdi al-Pachachi (1886–1948), Iraqi politician,
- Muzahim al-Pachachi (1891–1982), Iraqi politician,
- Maysoon Pachachi (born 1947), Iraqi film director
