= 1930 Iraqi parliamentary election =

- 20 October 1930

All 88 seats in the Chamber of Deputies 45 seats needed for a majority
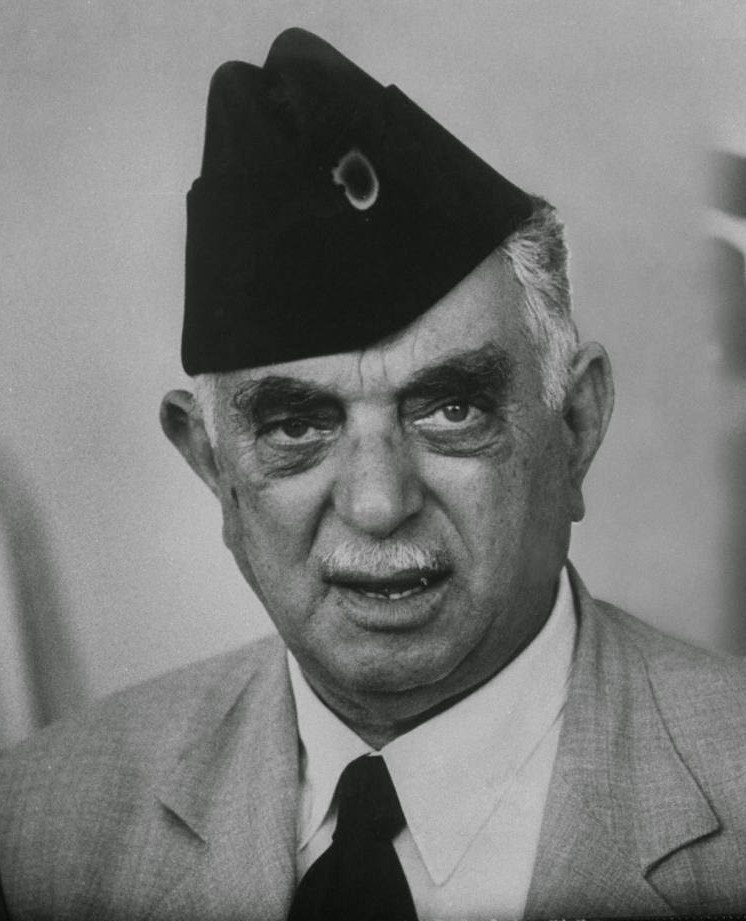

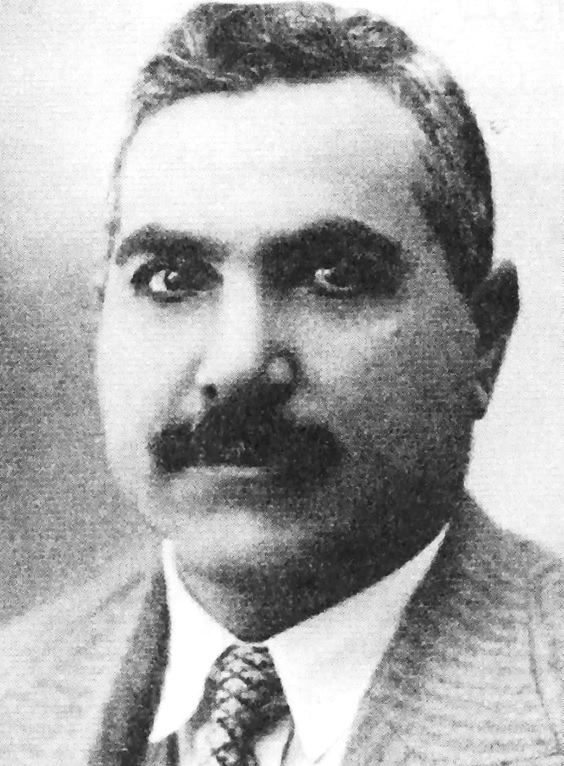
	First party	Second party
Leader	Nuri al-Said	Yasin al-Hashimi
Party	Covenant Party	People's Party
Last election	66 seats	22 seats
Seats won	70	13
Seat change	▲4	▼9
PM before election
Nuri al-Said
Covenant Party
Subsequent PM
Nuri al-Said
Covenant Party

Parliamentary elections were held in Iraq on 20 October 1930 to elect the members of the Chamber of Deputies. For every twenty thousand male citizens, one Member of Parliament was elected to the Chamber of Deputies (Majlis an-Nuwwab), the dominant chamber of Parliament over the Senate. It was the third election since the establishment of the parliament.

Nuri al-Said, who was appointed as Prime Minister on 23 March 1930, gathered his supporters to win a total of 70 seats, surpassing the seats needed for a majority by 25 and increasing the number of seats won in the 1928 election by 4. The opposition's People's Party had a large drop, losing 9 seats which resulted in them being a dominated minority in the council. Also, five seats were won by Independent politicians.

== Background ==
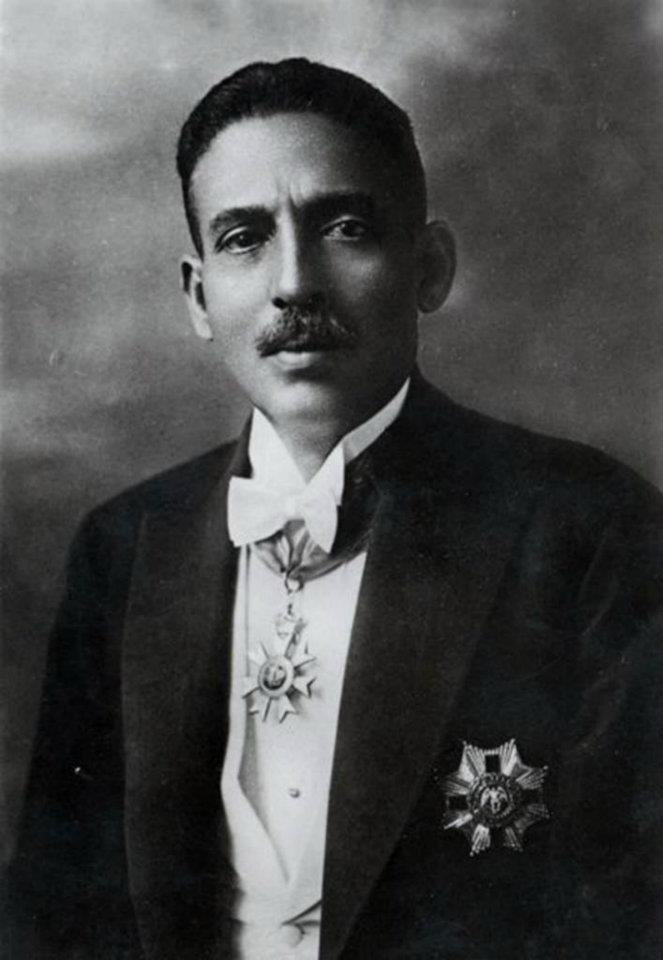
Abdul-Muhsin Al-Saadoun, leader of the Progress Party

During Abdul-Muhsin Al-Saadoun's second term as a Prime Minister, after the 1925 election, he founded the Progress Party to support the government and get an overall majority. King Faisal I wanted to remove Al-Saadoun from his office after the latter's tries to reduce the king's authorities, in which he succeeded by getting the majority of the council to vote for a different speaker than the one that was nominated by the government, resulting in his resignation. He was also concerned that he had too many allies in the British government and had the trust of the High Commissioner, so he made his two loyal men, Nuri al-Said and Jafar al-Askari, join his party and sabotage it.

After the resignation of Naji al-Suwaydi's ministry, in 1930, Faisal I appointed Nuri al-Said as the Prime Minister who postponed the meetings of the Progress Party dominated council so he could insure the approval of the Anglo-Iraqi Treaty (1930) by the council before dissolving it on 1 July, after signing the treaty, arguing that treaty will put Iraq in a new political situation, so it would be wise to seek the people's opinion about the treaty. The MPs objected and filed a complaint to the king, stating that the dissolution of the council violates the law and requesting the appointment of a new neutral ministry.

The opposition's National Party held a meeting, where their leader, Jaafar Abu Al-Timman, decided to boycott the election and called upon the people to boycott it as well but not many agreed with this decision and most of the party's followers attended the polling stations because the opposition's other party, People's Party, participated in it.

== Electoral system ==
According to the Electing Law and the Basic Law of 1925, all Iraqi male citizens over the age of 18 on the date of the election were permitted to vote. In the parliamentary elections, voting took place in all parliamentary constituencies, where the preliminary electors elected secondary electors, who in turn elected members of the parliament (MPs) to seats in the Chamber of Deputies. Each parliamentary constituency of Iraq elected one MP to the Council of Representatives using the Indirect election system. If one party obtained the majority of seats, that party was entitled to form the Government.

=== Timetable ===
The key dates were:

Tuesday 1 July	Dissolution of the 2nd Parliament
Thursday 10 July	Start of the preliminary election
Wednesday 10 September	End of the preliminary election
Monday 20 October	Election day
Saturday 1 November	Opening of Parliament

== Campaign ==
=== Pro-government ===
To guarantee the Sheikhs' loyalty, the government started giving them lands in the outskirts of cities and villages, and threatened to kick its people out if necessary. They took advantage of the country's financial hardship and need to organize the employees of the state's departments to announce a law that gives the authority of firing employees from their jobs to the Prime Minister, hinting that the firing will depend on the employee's political stance. During the preliminary election, Nuri al-Said did a tour in governorates of Basra, Hilla, Diwaniya, and Muntafiq where he, directly, presented the names of his supporters' candidates to the governors, inspectors, and administrators.

On the day of the election, taking advantage of the financial hardship once again, al-Said stated that the relations with London went beyond political affairs and that he succeeded in guaranteeing a sum of more than 50,000,000 rupees to be added to the treasury. He also stated that the government will lower the price of fuel, especially for farmers.

=== People's Party ===
The only electoral activity that the opposition's party participated in was a speech by Yasin al-Hashimi, on the day before the election day, to the secondary electors, in which he criticized the government, claiming that they would rationalize anything for the sake of getting a majority in the parliament to approve on the treaty. He also stated that the opposition is getting shamed by the government for the unification of their word and that their views were disregarded considering the treaty.

== Governmental interferences ==
Before the election, the government elected British inspection bodies to monitor the election, which was widely refused by the opposition, stating that the government doesn't fight for a majority, they just get an artificial one. At the same time, the Ministry of Interior summoned the governors that the government doubted their intentions to Baghdad and assigned undersecretaries during the election to, allegedly, hold a meeting that discusses the candidature of the representatives, to make sure that the governors who support the outgoing Minister of Finance who resigned, Ali Jawdat al-Aiyubi, don't switch to the opposition's side. The government also coordinated with the British via the consultant of the Ministry of Interior who requested from the inspection bodies across the governorates to supply them with lists of the candidates and the possibility of them voting in favor of the treaty, against it, and the dubitable ones.

Due to the treaty not mentioning the Kurds' privileges, the citizens in Sulaymaniyah boycotted the election and soon after that, on 6 September, more than fifty people began a riot where they assaulted the police and the army, resulting in the death of a soldier and 13 rioters, the injury of ten police officers and two soldiers, and the detention of more than a hundred rioters. The inspection bodies also forced some of the people that boycotted the election in Shawkah into participating in the election by faking a funeral in a mosque, which they went to.

Upon the resignation of Ali Jawdat al-Aiyubi from the Ministry of Finance, Nuri al-Said nominated the Minister of Interior, Jamil al-Midfai, for the ministry so the former could take the Ministry of Interior, especially after al-Midfai objected on some of the government's candidates and suggested other people that al-Said didn't see fit, along with the British government's doubts surrounding him and the expectation of him helping his friend, Yasin al-Hashimi, to obtain the majority. Al-Said eventually held the Ministry of Interior on 10 October. He also requested from his candidates to pledge and swear on voting in favor of the treaty.

Al-Said tried to divide the National Party which boycotted the election by winning Bahjat Zeenal to his side, taking advantage of their friendship, and Mohammed Mahdi Al-Baseer who was given a scholarship to Cairo One of the party's leading members, Abdul-Ghafour Al-Badri, was threatened by a retired military officer that he would eliminate him which made him resign from the party.

The People's Party filed a number of complaints to the king of the illegitimacy of the election, published the names of the people who boycotted the election in the newspapers, called for a working strike, and organized demonstrations, which were suppressed by the government.

== Results ==
Party	Seats	+/–
Pro-government	70	+4
People's Party	13	–9
Independents	5	+5
Total	88	0
Source: Al-Hasani

== Sources ==
- Faraj, Lutfi Jaafar. (1988). عبد المحسن السعدون: دوره في تاريخ العراق السياسي المعاصر. Baghdad: Al-Yaqatha Al-Arabiya Press. INLA 185609 (in Arabic)
- Mohammed, Alaa Jasim. (1990). الملك فيصل الاول: حياته ودوره السياسي في الثورة العربية وسورية والعراق 1888–1933. Baghdad: Al-Yaqatha Al-Arabiya Press. INLA 227541 (in Arabic)
- Al-Hassani, Abdul-Razzaq. (1982). تاريخ الوزارات العراقية في العهد الملكي – الجزء الثاني. Baghdad: Al-Yaqatha Al-Arabiya Press. INLA 122750 (in Arabic)
- Al-Hassani, Abdul-Razzaq. (1982). تاريخ الوزارات العراقية في العهد الملكي – الجزء الثالث. Baghdad: Al-Yaqatha Al-Arabiya Press. INLA 122754 (in Arabic)
- Al-Naseeri, Abdul-Razzaq. (1987). نوري السعيد ودوره في السياسة العراقية حتى عام 1932. Baghdad: Times Company. INLA 141614 (in Arabic)
- Aladhami, M. M. Hashim. Political Aspects of the Iraqi Parliament and Election Processes 1920–1932. A thesis submitted for the degree of PhD. School of Oriental and African Studies, University of London. 1978
- Al-Omari, Khairi. (1955). شخصيات عراقية – الجزء الأول. Baghdad: Al-Ma'arifa Press. INLA 64822 (in Arabic)
- Kubba, M. Mahdi. (1965). مذكراتي في صميم الاحداث 1918–1958. Beirut: Al-Talee'a Press. INLA 545424 (in Arabic)
- Al-Omar, Farouq Salih. (1978). الاحزاب السياسية في العراق 1921–1932. Baghdad: Al-Irshad Press. INLA 347685 (in Arabic)
- Al-Darraji, Abdul-Razzaq. (1978). جعفر ابو التمن ودوره في الحركة الوطنية في العراق 1908–1945. Baghdad: Al-Hurriya Press. INLA 233295 (in Arabic)
