= 1928 Iraqi parliamentary election =

- 9 May 1928

All 88 seats in the Chamber of Deputies 45 seats needed for a majority
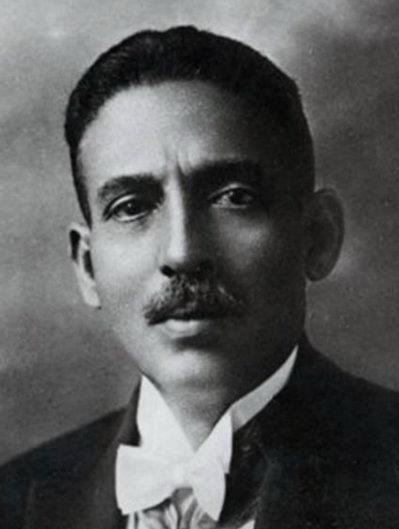

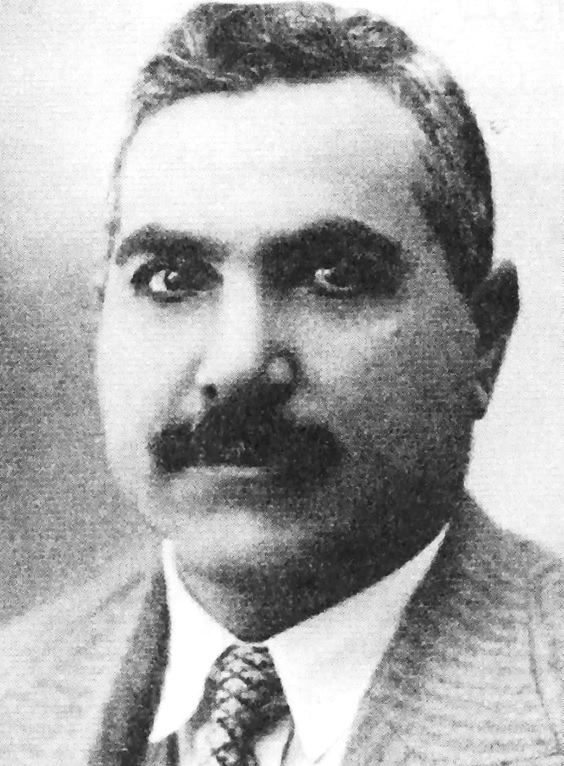
	First party	Second party
Leader	Abdul-Muhsin Al-Saadoun	Yasin al-Hashimi
Party	Progress Party	People's Party
Last election	60	28
Seats won	66	22
Seat change	▲6	▼6
PM before election
Abdul-Muhsin Al-Saadoun
Progress Party
Subsequent PM
Abdul-Muhsin Al-Saadoun
Progress Party

Parliamentary elections were held in Iraq in 1928, with the final day of voting on 9 May, to elect the members of Chamber of Deputies. They were the second elections under the 1925 constitution. There were many complaints about the integrity of the elections and the way the government handled them, with some candidates collating evidence of vote manipulation. The opposition Independence Party and Iraqi National Party wrote a letter to the British Prime Minister complaining about the Iraqi government's violation of electoral law, demanding an investigation, and offering to pay for its cost. Nevertheless, the newly elected council convened on 13 May 1928 and elected Abdul-Aziz Al-Qassab, the interior minister in Al-Saadoun government, as Speaker.

== Contesting parties ==
The dominating pro-government faction was the Progress Party, which had been founded by Abdul-Muhsin Al-Saadoun in 1925. Nuri al-Said and Jafar al-Askari were also members of the party. The main opposition faction was the People's Party led by Yasin al-Hashimi, who was known for his opposition to the Anglo-Iraqi Treaty of 1922. The Independence Party and Iraqi National Party also participated as opposition parties.

== Results ==
The elections resulted in a decisive victory for the government party. As a result, Al-Saadoun remained Prime Minister.

== Aftermath ==
On 23 March 1930 Nuri al-Said became Prime Minister for the first time. He started negotiating a new treaty with the British government to replace the 1922 document. This resulted in the Anglo-Iraqi Treaty of 1930, which was set to prepare Iraq to become an independent member of the League of Nations. The government proposed that a new parliament should examine the treaty and vote on it. The new treaty was signed by the Iraqi and British governments on 30 June 1928. The following day parliament was dissolved, and al-Said government started preparing for fresh elections.
