= 1922–1924 Iraqi Constituent Assembly election =

Elections to a Constituent Assembly (Arabic: المجلس التأسيسي, al-Majlis al-Ta’seessy) were held in Iraq between 24 October 1922 and 25 February 1924, electing the country's first parliament. The Constituent Assembly was elected to draft a constitution, legislate a law for general elections, and ratify the Anglo-Iraqi Treaty of 1922.

== Background ==
After World War I, Iraq was founded as a country under the British administration through a mandate issued by the League of Nations in 1920. On 21 November 1920, the first Iraqi government was established, Abd Al-Rahman Al-Gillani was appointed as the first Prime Minister of Iraq. In 1921, Faisal I was elected as King of Iraq by the Cairo Conference. On 10 October 1922, the Anglo-Iraqi Treaty was signed by the Iraqi and British governments.

== Results ==
The elections used an indirect electoral system, in which the general public (only men over 18 were allowed to vote) elected 383 secondary voters, who in turn elected the 100 deputies of the Assembly. The Assembly convened on 27 March 1924 with the King and British officials attending the opening ceremony. The main political issue at the time was ratifying the Anglo-Iraqi Treaty. There were no formal parties, although those who supported ratifying the Treaty without revisions were considered pro-government and pro-treaty; this bloc was led by Abdul Muhsin al-Sa'dun and Prime Minister Ja'far al-Askari. Those who opposed the treaty or sought its revision before ratifying were seen as anti-government; this bloc was led by Yasin al-Hashimi. During the first Assembly session, both Al-Sa'dun and Al-Hashimi ran for the position of Speaker, with Al-Sa'dun winning by a vote of 50–23. The Assembly continued its meetings until 2 August, with the first general elections held the following year.

== Aftermath ==
Despite a strong campaign by the anti-treaty parties, the British administration succeeded in convincing the King and hesitant politicians and deputies to accept the treaty. On 10 June 1924, the assembly convened to vote on the Anglo-Iraqi Treaty. 69 deputies attended the meeting and the assembly approved the treaty by a vote of 37–24.
