= Hanna Khayat =

- حنا خياط

Minister of Health
- In office 1921–1922
- Monarch: Faisal I of Iraq
- Prime Minister: Abd Al-Rahman Al-Gillani

General administrator of Public Health
- In office 1922–1931
- Monarch: Faisal I of Iraq
- Prime Minister: Yasin al-Hashimi; Jafar al-Askari; Abd al-Muhsin as-Sa'dun; Abd Al-Rahman Al-Gillani

Council of Representatives of Iraq
- In office 1943–1946
- Monarch: Faisal II
- Constituency: Mosul

Council of Representatives of Iraq
- In office 1950–1953
- Monarch: Faisal II
- Constituency: Mosul

Personal details
- Born: Hanna Behnam Yosef Abdul ahad Al khayat 1884 Mosul, Ottoman Iraq
- Died: 30 April 1959 (aged 74–75) Baghdad, Iraq
- Citizenship: Iraqi
- Profession: Physician; politician

Hanna Behnam Yosef Abdulahad Khayat (1884 – 30 April 1959) was an Iraqi physician and politician. He was known as the first minister of health in Iraq from September 12, 1921, to 19 August 1922. He became General manager of Public Health Administration in Iraq from 1922 to 1931 after the abolition of the Ministry of Health and its transformation into a Public Administration. In 1925 he became advisor to King Faisal. He was elected twice as a deputy in the Senate for Mosul, first from 1943 to 1946 and from 1950 to 1953. His health projects contributed to the development of health staff in Iraq. He has written many books and pamphlets that have contributed to spreading health awareness in Iraqi health institutes.

== Early life and education ==
Hanna Khayat was born in 1884 in Mosul to a Syriac Catholic family, He completed his school in Mosul; then he decided to go outside home to complete his studies, He received a Bachelor of Literatures and Sciences from the French University of Beirut in 1903, his Diploma in Medicine from the Universities of Paris and Istanbul in 1908 and was elected a member of the Medical and Surgical Society in Brussels. After returning to Mosul during the First World War, he was elected Vice President of the Red Crescent Society in the city. He was fluent in Arabic, Turkish, French and English.

== Career ==
After the end of the Ottoman rule, Hanna Khayat moved to Syria, where he preferred to work under the French mandate because of the influence of French culture during his studies. He was known there to King Faisal in 1920, and moved with him to Iraq. After the establishment of national rule, he served as Minister of Health from 1921 to 1922 in the Abd Al-Rahman Al-Gillani government. When the Ministry of Health was abolished and merged into the Ministry of Interior, he assumed the presidency of the Public Health Administration from 1922 to 1931. Since 1926 he lectured Arabic medicine in the College of Law and Medicine in Baghdad and in 1931 was appointed Director General of Foreign Affairs and Inspector General of Health in 1933. He published several articles in Iraqi newspapers that spoke about health guidance and he contributed to improving hospitals in Iraq. Hanna Khayat spoke of neglect in Mosul facilities during the Ottoman period and attributed the reasons for health neglect to the neglect of government at a time when the authority attributed the shortcomings in this regard to the people, denying their willingness to promote health.

After being appointed to retirement, he was elected deputy for the Senate in Mosul in its tenth session (October 1943 - November 1946). Hanna Khayat presented his medical project to King Faisal II when they met for the first time. The project concerned linking health practice, medical departments and legislation. He expressed concern about the increased incidence of disease in children and spoke about the prevention of tuberculosis and the management of insect risks. He was elected deputy for Mosul for the second time from June 1950 to October 1953.

== Death ==
In his last days, he wrote a diary book entitled Days Speak and died on April 30, 1959, in Baghdad.

== Awards ==
- Ottoman medal Third degree
- White Turkish Spear Medal
- The Order of the Mesopotamia of the fourth and second class
- Medal of Excellence from Germany
- Benemerenti medal
- Honorary Lebanese Medal of Merit from the president Émile Eddé

== See also ==
- Yousef Ghanima
