= Rashid al-Khoja =

Ottoman and Iraqi politician

Rashid Taha al-Khoja
- رشيد طه الخوجة

President of the Chamber of Deputies
- In office 29 December 1934 – March 1935
- Monarch: Ghazi I
- Preceded by: Salman al-Barrak
- Succeeded by: Ali Jawdat al-Ayyubi

Minister of Defence
- In office 4 March 1935 – 16 March 1935
- Monarch: Ghazi I
- Preceded by: Ja'far al-Askari
- Succeeded by: Jamil al-Midfai

Minister of Defence
- In office 3 November 1932 – 20 March 1933
- Monarch: Faisal I
- Preceded by: Jalal Baban
- Succeeded by: Ja'far al-Askari

Personal details
- Born: 1884 Baghdad, Ottoman Empire
- Died: 1962 (aged 77–78)

Rashid Taha al-Khoja (Arabic: رشيد طه الخوجة, 1884–1962) was an Iraqi politician and general in the Ottoman Empire and later in the Kingdom of Iraq. He previously participated in the Russo-Ottoman Caucasus War before coming back to Iraq in 1919 and holding several offices in the country. Al-Khoja is remembered as an example of an early educated Iraqi politician who was also enthusiastic.

== Biography ==
In the early 1900s, al-Khoja completed his higher education in Istanbul, studying at the Military Academy and the Staff College. He then graduated in 1906 with the rank of B. Afterwards, he entered the Ottoman army and was sent to participate in the Russo-Ottoman Caucasus campaign, rising to the rank of Brigadier General. With the end of World War I, he traveled to Damascus in 1919, where he would then return to Baghdad on the eve of the Mandate for Mesopotamia. Upon arrival to Baghdad in 25 November 1920, he was welcomed by its people and was highlighted in the newspaper, al-Istiqlal, for his national role in serving the Arab cause due to negotiations he participated in during the Arab Revolt.

=== Career in Iraq ===
After arriving in Baghdad, he was elected as one of the first members of the newly established Iraqi parliament. One month after the formation of the new Iraqi state on 20 October 1920, the first ministry headed by Abd al-Rahman al-Gilani, al-Khoja was appointed as the first mutasarrif of Baghdad in recognition of his activism. However, he was then transferred to the position of mutasarrif of Mosul in 1923 due to the sensitivity of the Mosul province, which was then still claimed by the Ottomans.

Al-Khoja enjoyed a close friendship with the then Minister of Interior, Talib al-Naqib, and helped assign him the position. Although at the time, the selection of people for administrative positions at that time was not only dependent on the approval of the Ministry of the Interior or the Council of Ministers, but also required the approval of the British High Commissioner, Percy Cox. Al-Khoja played a big part in developing education and planning in these positions. He stressed the importance of education and reading as a part of developing civilizations. During this time, he toured around the many schools the Ja'fari school in Kadhimiyya and al-Badouni School. In 1921, he made necessary arrangements to receive Faisal bin Hussein when he arrived in Basra on 23 June 1921 to be crowned King of Iraq.

He was appointed governor of Baghdad for a second time on 11 May 1923, and remained in this position until 15 September 1924. Around this time, the position of the Mayor of Baghdad was established and he became the second mayor of Baghdad, succeeding Subhi Nash'at, the first mayor, in 1924. In 1924, Rashid al-Khuja was reappointed until 1931 when Arshad al-Umari and Mahmud Subhi al-Daftari succeeded him.

Later, he served as the Minister of Defense from 3 November 1932 to 18 March 1933, as well as during the years 1934 and 1935, and served as Speaker of the Iraqi Parliament in 1933-1934 and 1934-1935. In 1938, he held the position of Chief of the Royal Court.
