= Abd al-Wahab Mirjan =

Prime minister of Iraq from 1957 to 1958

- عبد الوهاب مرجان
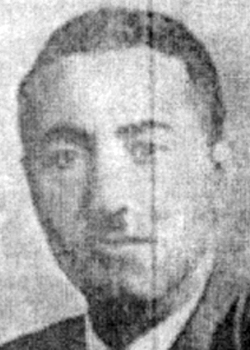

Prime Minister of Iraq
- In office 15 December 1957 – 3 March 1958
- Monarch: Faisal II
- Preceded by: Ali Jawdat al-Aiyubi
- Succeeded by: Nuri al-Said

Personal details
- Born: 1909 Hillah, Ottoman Iraq
- Died: March 15, 1964 (age 54–55) Baghdad, Iraq

Abd al-Wahab Mirjan (Arabic: عبد الوهاب مرجان; 1909 – March 15, 1964) was an Iraqi politician who served as the Prime Minister of Iraq from 1957 to 1958. His tenure as prime minister oversaw Iraq's short-lived union with Jordan, which was formalized on February 14, 1958. A relative newcomer to the Iraqi government, Murjan first joined the cabinet in 1947. He resigned less than a month after the federation was declared, in favor of Nuri al-Said, and survived the 1958 republican coup later that year and died in 1964.

Mirjan was known, along with his father Abd al-Razzaq Mirjan, as being compassionate to his country; Abd al-Razzaq Mirjan and his cousin Abdul Abbas donated a number of valuable assets, such as Mirjan Hospital in the Babylon Province in central Iraq and a large number of houses for the poor in the country.

== Biography ==
Abd al-Wahab bin Abd al-Razzaq bin Jawad bin Mahmud al-Murjan, came from a renowned family in al-Hilla, where he was born in 1909. He graduated from the College of Law in Baghdad in 1932 and was appointed Justice of the Peace in Suweira (January 1938). However, he resigned after a short period, devoting himself to his law practice and the management of his estates. In September 1942 he was elected President of al-Hilla Chamber of Agriculture.

In March 1947 he was elected member of the Iraqi lower house Chamber of Deputies of Iraq, representing al-Hilla Liwa’ (province) and was re-elected in the following year. He was re-elected to the Chamber of Deputies in all subsequent terms until the revolution of 1958.

Mirjan was appointed Minister of Economy in Muzahim al-Pachachi's cabinet from 26 June 1948 until November 1948. He was elected president of the Chamber of Deputies on first of December 1948 and re-elected to a new term as chamber president on first of December 1949. After that he was appointed Minister of Communications and Public Works and acting Minister of Finance in Nuri al-Said's eleventh cabinet (16 September 1950); then Minister of Finance (25 December 1950) and president of the Chamber of Deputies for the third time (first of December 1951), remaining in this office until the Chamber was dissolved on 27 October 1952.

In al-Madfai's sixth cabinet (29 January 1953) he undertook the Communications and Public Works portfolio, retaining his position in al-Madfai's seventh cabinet (7 May 1953) until he resigned on 21 May 1953. He was then elected president of the Chamber of Deputies for the fourth time on first December 1953, remaining until the Chamber was dissolved on 29 April 1954. He was re-elected the president of the new Chamber which convened on 26 July 1954; but the Chamber was immediately dissolved on 3 August 1954.

He participated in Nuri al-Said's twelfth cabinet as Minister of Agriculture (3 August 1954), then was elected another time to the presidency of the Chamber of Deputies on 16 September 1954; was re-elected as the chamber president on first of December 1954; again on first of December 1955 and on first of December 1956. He became Minister of Communications and Public Works in al-Ayyubi's third cabinet (20 June 1957); then president of the Chamber of Deputies (first of December 1957). He undertook the office of Prime Minister and acting Minister of Defence on 15 December 1957, remaining until 2 March 1958.

On 10 May 1958 he was re-elected president of the Chamber of Deputies, remaining in this position until the revolution of 14 July 1958.

Subsequent to the revolution he was detained for a short period then released. He became terminally ill and died in Baghdad on the morning of Sunday 15 March 1964.

== Legacy ==
Mirjan was recognized for having a paragon of kindness, with a pristine soul and an affable character. He attained the highest government positions within ten years, which added to his modesty and tranquility. When first elected member of the Chamber of Deputies in March 1947, Khalid al-Durra, one of the members of the upper echelon of al-Hilla and a distinguished lawyer there, described him in al-Wadi magazine:

“Abdul-Wahab is a sincerely patriotic young man; undoubtedly desiring to work for his country’s eminence and progress. He is clean handed, clean spoken and loved by those who knew him ...”
