= Independent Democrats (disambiguation) =

Independent Democrats may refer to:

- Independent Democrat, an American political designation
- Independent Democrats, a political party in South Africa
- Independent Democrats (Greece), a defunct political party in Greece
- Independent Democrats (Czech Republic), a political party in the Czech Republic
- Assembly of Independent Democrats, a political alliance in Iraq
