= Mishkat al-Mumin =

Iraqi lawyer and lecturer

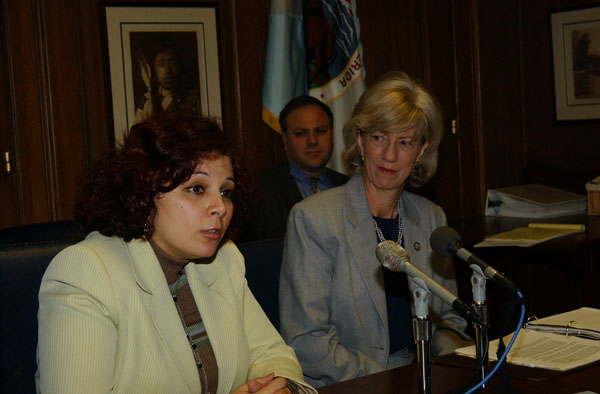
Al-Moumin (left) with Gale Norton in 2004

Mishkat Al-Moumin (Arabic: مشكاة المؤمن Mishkāt al-Mū‘min, also Romanized al-Mumin) is an Iraqi lawyer and lecturer. She served as the Minister of Environment in the Iraqi Interim Government under Iyad Allawi (2004–05). After surviving several assassination attempts due to her advocacy for women's rights, she moved to the United States.

== Biography ==
Mishkat al-Moumin was born in Beirut, Lebanon but moved with her family to Iraq. Her father was a lecturer at the Institute of Fine Arts in Baghdad. She received her Master of Arts and Ph.D. degrees from the University of Baghdad. Al-Moumin began her career as a lawyer, serving as a member and supervisor of Head's Office for Iraqi Bar Association. In 2001, she joined the Baghdad University's College of Law as a lecturer, a post she held until 2004.

Al-Moumin established and became the director of Women and Environment Organisation. She has also been the Women's Issues director at the Free Iraq Foundation.

In June 2004, Al-Moumin joined the Iraqi Interim Government as an Iraqi Independent Democrats (IID) member. She was the country's first Environment Minister and planned its structure. With her at the helm, the ministry released Iraq's first report on environmental status.

Al-Moumin's advocacy for women's rights angered jihadist Abu Musab al-Zarqawi. He called her "the leader of infidels" and sent death threats to Al-Moumin ["we'll get her next time"]. She survived an assassination attempt in August 2004. While moving through Qadisia, a car bomb struck her convoy, instantly killing four of her bodyguards. Following further attempts on her life, she relocated to the United States in 2005. George Mason University appointed her as an adjunct professor of environmental studies in 2006. She is also a fellow of Environmental Law Institute. She holds an M.A. in public administration from Harvard University (2006).

== Bibliography ==
- Dougherty, Beth K.; Ghareeb, Edmund A. (2013). Historical Dictionary of Iraq. Scarecrow Press. ISBN 978-0-8108-7942-3.
