= Abd al-Razzaq Mirjan =

Abdul Razzak Mirjan
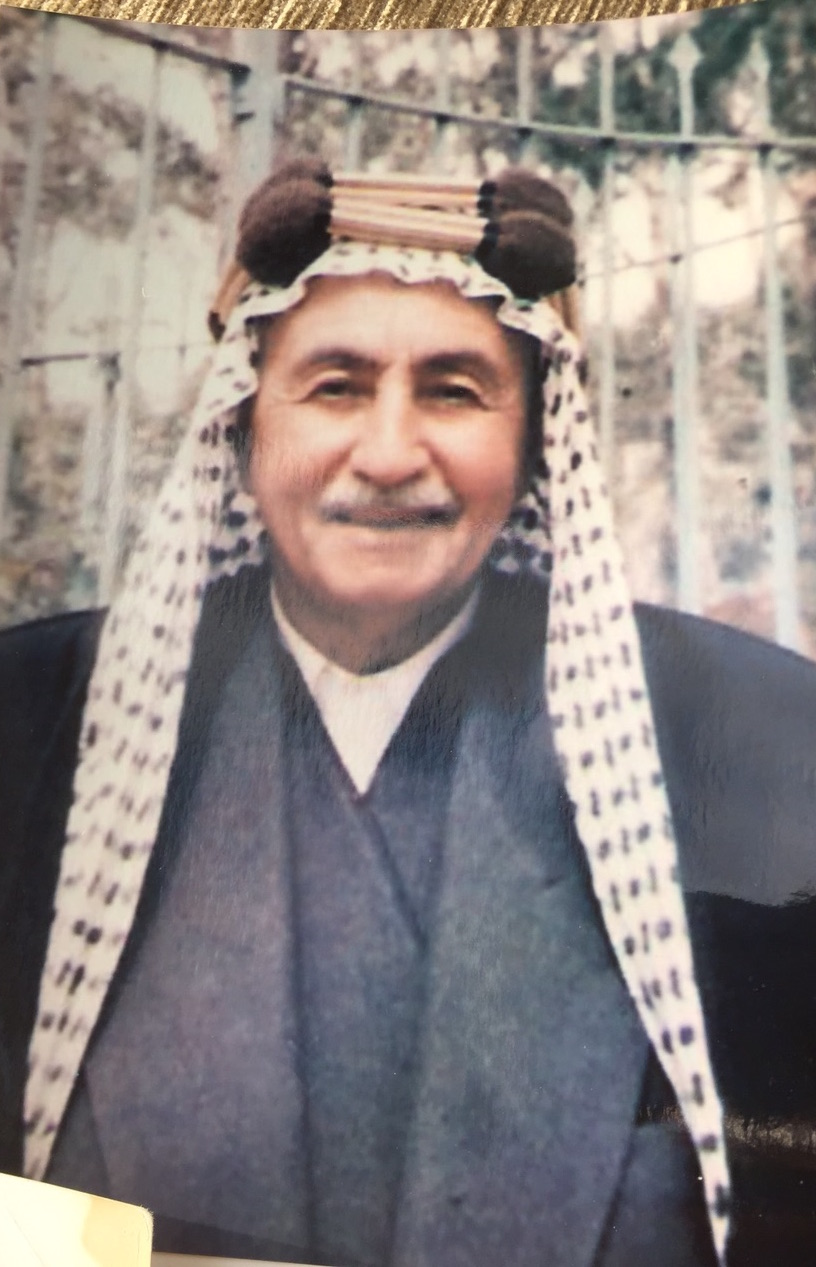
- Born: 1883; Hilla, Ottoman Iraq
- Died: 1970 (aged 86–87)

Abdul Razzak Mirjan (1883 – 1970) was an Iraqi politician and statesman. He was one of the founders of the Kufa University, located in Kufa, Iraq, which he founded alongside Mahdi Muhsin al-Hakim, Mohamed Makiya, and Kadhim Shubber. He is the father of Abdul Wahab Mirjan, the Prime Minister of Iraq from 1957 to 1958. He also built and donated a number of mosques and shrines for scholars in the mid Euphrates region of Iraq.

== Early life ==
Hajji Abdul Al-Razzak Mirjan was born in the town of Hilla in Iraq to a farming family. His father moved the family to the town of Nasiriyah in 1880, when the Euphrates River rerouted due to excessive sedimentations until, 1905 when the situation was improving with the start of the building of the Al Hindya Dam. The family returned to Hilla to develop further their farming activities where they cultivated farming land. Abdul Razzak was one of the pioneers in expanding rice farming to the region. This resulted in the land yielding a rice harvest in the summer and a wheat harvest in the winter amongst other yields such as cotton.

== Career ==
Abdul Razzak Mirjan built and donated mosques and a number of shrines for scientists and scholars in the mid Ephrates region of Iraq. These included the shrines for Ja'far Yahya Bin Saeed, Ibin Nema, Abu al-Fadayel – Ahmad ibn Tawoos amongst many others. He reconstructed the al-Noukta Mosque, west of Aleppo in Syria. His name was synonymous with helping families in need and charitable donations. When you enter the town of Hilla you will notice the grand entrance of "The Mirjan Hospital". Abd al-Razzak Mirjan built the hospital with a contribution from his cousin Hajji Abd al-Abbas Mirjan. The hospital, which stands in a 250,000 m^{2} plot along the Euphrates River, was bequeathed to the nation. It was opened by King Faisal II on 22 March 1957 in a grand ceremony attended by over 5000 guests including Prime Minister Nuri al-Said and Crown Prince 'Abd al-Ilah of Hejaz. Originally a chest diseases hospital, the Murjan Hospital continued to develop to become one of the main teaching hospital complexes for all specialties in the region.

== Family and legacy ==
His eldest son, Abdul Al-Wahab Mirjan, had a career in politics he served as Prime Minister of Iraq in 1957 having previously been appointed in various cabinets as, Minister of Communication and Public Works, Minister of Economy, Ministry of Agriculture, Minister of Finance and was elected Speaker of the Chamber of Deputies, no less than eleven times. Abd Al-Razzak Mirjan's second son is Abdul Al-Jalil, a lawyer, has continued to dedicated most of his time to following on, developing and the management of the family's farming business having had set up of a range of manufacturing industries in Baghdad. Abd al-Razzak Jawad Ahmed Mahmoud Mansur Mirjan, from The Rabe'a Tribe, was a founding member of the Party of National Brotherhood in 1931.

In the 21st century, the house of the Mirjan family in Hilla, which was owned by Abdul Al-Razzak and was visited by the political elite during the Iraqi monarchy period, was preserved by his grandson Zaid Abdul Adheem Mirjan. Recognizing its historical and cultural importance, many of the house's antiques and parts are on display to the public.
