= Hamdi al-Pachachi =

Prime minister of Iraq from 1944 to 1946

- حمدي الباجه جي
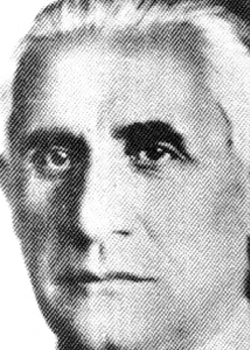

Prime Minister of Iraq
- In office 4 June 1944 – 23 February 1946
- Monarch: Faisal II
- Regent: Prince Abdullah
- Preceded by: Nuri al-Said
- Succeeded by: Tawfiq al-Suwaidi

Foreign Minister of Iraq
- In office January 1948 – March 1948
- Prime Minister: Mohammad Al-Sadr

Personal details
- Born: 1886 Baghdad, Ottoman Iraq
- Died: 1948
- Relations: Muzahim al-Pachachi; Adnan Pachachi; Nadim al-pachachi
- Education: Istanbul University Faculty of Law

Hamdi al-Pachachi (Arabic: حمدي الباجه جي; 1886 – March 28, 1948), Iraqi politician born to a prominent family in Baghdad. He studied law at the Royal School in Istanbul, graduating in 1909. He taught at the Baghdad Law School from 1913 to 1916. While in Istanbul, he joined the Covenant Society and became active in the Arab nationalist movement. Upon his return to Baghdad, he joined with the nationalists, who were demanding the decentralization of the Ottoman Empire. As a result of his political activities in support of the Iraqi revolt against the British in 1920, al-Pachachi was arrested and exiled to Hanja, an island in the Persian Gulf. After his release, he continued to take part in anti-British activities. Hamdi ala Pachachi had three daughters.

In 1925, he began cooperating with Abd al-Muhsin as-Sa'dun. Al-Pachachi served as minister of waqf in one of as-Sa'dun's cabinets (1925–26). He then retired from politics for many years. A large landowner, he concentrated on business matters and agriculture.

In 1935, he was elected deputy to the Chamber of Deputies. He was minister of social welfare in 1941. He served as the president of the Chamber of Deputies from November 1941 to December 1943.

Al-Pachachi served as Prime Minister of Iraq between 1944 and 1946. He was brought in to succeed Nuri al-Said after increasing tensions between himself and the regent. The difference in policy was not dramatic, as al-Pachachi included members of Nuri's inner circle and advisors close to the regent in his cabinet. Small changes to government policy included a relaxation of the censorship on the press and the introduction of the 1945 Miri Sirf Law. This law was intended to be the beginning of a land reform on a larger scale, and distributed state land to a number of landless peasants.

Contrary to Nuri al-Said, his primary foreign focus was on the strengthening of the Arab League and the integration of Iraq into that organization. Hamdi emphasized co-operation among the Arab countries in the spirit of Arab nationalism, unlike Nuri, who focused on increasing the political power of Iraq within the League. He succeeded in maintaining excellent ties with the Egyptian and Syrian politicians, despite significant protest against their dominance in the League and region. As Prime Minister, Hamdi al-Pachachi released many of the nationalists who had been detained after the 1941 Iraqi coup d'état, having been a supporter of it himself, but he had to face the growing Kurdish rebellion led by Mulla Mustafa. Al-Pachachi rejected their terms, and they revolted in mid-1945 but had to flee to Iran in October. Al-Pachachi's victory over the Kurds made him more popular with others, and in December he called for greater political freedom for political parties with free elections. On May 29, 1945, France bombed Damascus and tried to arrest its democratically elected leaders who were demanding their full independence from French occupation. When Hamdi al-Pachachi returned to Baghdad from the Arab League conference in Cairo on June 15, he stated "We will soon be rid of the nightmare of French imperialism in the Levant. The Arab states will enjoy their legitimate rights and international status thanks to united Arab effort." On October 4, 1945, Al-Pachachi in his capacity as Prime Minister of Iraq addressed a letter to the United States government, stating in reaction to President Truman's calls to open Palestine for Jewish immigration "The Iraq government regards it as its duty to inform the American Government that it deems any support of Zionism as contrary to the interests of the Iraqi State and the Arab peoples generally. In view of the friendship that Iraq feels towards the Americans it is hoped that America will avoid causing injury to the Arabs in their homelands by such intervention. Zionism is an aggressive move towards the heart of the Arab nation. The Arabs intend to use all means at their disposal to defend existence and the safety and security of their home."

Ties between the British-backed regent 'Abd al-Ilah and al-Pachachi were gradually weakened as the Regent argued for more involvement in the political party system. Under intense pressure from 'Abd al-Ilah, al-Pachachi was forced to resign from his post as Prime Minister in February 1946. On May 2, 1946, he said the Arabs must "take decisive action, which is now the only available course" regarding the issue of Palestine.

In 1948, the year of the Arab-Israeli war, Pachachi was appointed Foreign Minister under Prime Minister Sayyid Muhammad as-Sadr. On February 18, 1948, he announced that the Arab-Israeli war was the fault of then US President Harry Truman stating "Mr. Truman set fire to Palestine." On March 9, 1948, Pachachi announced that "the Arabs will take action to prevent the continued bloodshed in Palestine" and that the Arab and Muslim world must reject the establishment of Israel "at any price." He died of a heart attack while in that office at the age of 65, on March 28, 1948.
