= Assembly of Independent Democrats =

- Leader: Adnan Pachachi
- Founded: 2005
- Dissolved: 2006
- Ideology: Liberalism; Secularism; Nonsectarianism
- Seats in the Council of Representatives of Iraq: 0 / 328

The Assembly of Independent Democrats was an electoral coalition that participated in the January 30, 2005 National Assembly legislative election in Iraq. It was led by Adnan Pachachi (a Sunni Arab former foreign minister who was on the Iraqi Governing Council until January 2004) and his party, the Democratic Centrist Tendency. The assembly included also Dr Mahdi al-Hafez, who was the minister of planning, Dr Ayham al-Samarie, former minister of electricity, Maysun al-Damluji, deputy minister of culture, Omar al-Farouq al-Damaluji, former minister of reconstruction, Atta Abdul-Wahab, ambassador of Iraq in Jordan, Mishkat al-Mumin, former minister of environment, Leila Abdul Latif, former minister of Labor & Social Affairs, Saad Abdul-Razzaq Hussain, and some other Iraqi politicians.

In the December 2005 elections the list joined the Iraqi National List coalition headed by former Prime Minister Ayad Allawi; it was broken up afterwards.

The list was represented in the National Assembly by Adnan Pachachi and Maysun al-Damluji.
