= Naji Al-Suwaidi =

10th prime minister of Iraq (1882–1942)

Naji al-Suwaidi
- ناجي السويدي
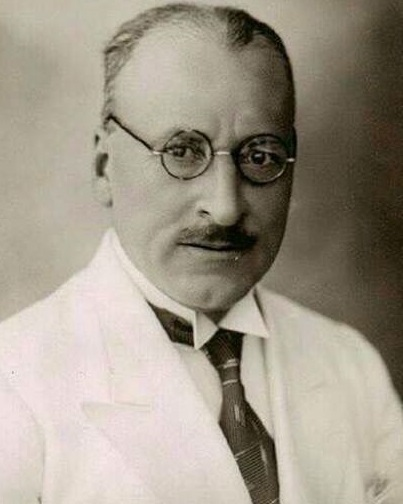

Prime Minister of Mandatory of Iraq
- In office 18 November 1929 – 23 March 1930
- Monarch: Faisal I
- Preceded by: Abd al-Muhsin as-Sa'dun
- Succeeded by: Nuri as-Said

Personal details
- Born: 1882 Baghdad, Ottoman Iraq
- Died: 17 August 1942 (aged 59–60) Union of South Africa
- Relations: Yusef Effendi al-Suwaidi (father); Tawfiq al-Suwaidi (brother); Aref al-Suwaidi (brother); Shaker Al-Suwaidi (brother)

Naji al-Suwaydi (Arabic: ناجي السويدي; 1882 – 17 August 1942) was an Iraqi politician who served as Prime Minister of Iraq from November 1929 to March 1930.

Gertrude Bell wrote in May 1921:

Naji Suwaidi has drawn up and submitted to me a programme for a moderate Sharifian party-

which I showed to Sir Percy [Cox] who thought it all right. I'm very grateful to Naji for keeping me so closely in touch... I've found Naji very sensible and capable as well as very

patient under the prolonged delay.

Naji al-Suwaydi became prime minister in November 1929, following the suicide of Abd al-Muhsin as-Sa'dun. His short time in the post was marked by street protests agitating for a treaty that would pave the way towards Iraqi independence from the British Mandate of Mesopotamia. That turmoil, combined with attacks from hostile newspapers and undermining from both King Faisal I and Nuri as-Said, led him to resign in March 1930.

Al-Suwaydi presided over the 1937 Bloudan Conference, one of the first pan-Arab conferences held in solidarity with Palestinian Arabs against the Zionist movement.

He served as Minister of Finance from February 1934 to August 1934, from March 1940 to February 1941 and April 1941 - May 1941. Naji Al-Suwaidi was a member of the rebel government following the 1941 Iraqi coup d'état. Later taken in custody, he died while being transported from Southern Rhodesia to South Africa.

He was the brother of Tawfiq al-Suwaydi, also a Prime Minister of Iraq.

Political offices
Preceded by Abd al-Muhsin as-Sa'dun	Prime Minister of Iraq; November 18, 1929— March 23, 1930	Succeeded by Nuri as-Said
