= Nadim al-Pachachi =

Iraqi diplomat (1914–1976)

- نديم الباجه جي

8th Secretary General of OPEC
- In office 1 January 1971 – 31 December 1972
- Preceded by: Omar el-Badri
- Succeeded by: Abderrahman Khène

Personal details
- Born: 18 March 1914 Baghdad, Ottoman Empire
- Died: 29 February 1976 (aged 61) Switzerland
- Party: Independent
- Relations: Muzahim al-Pachachi; Hamdi al-Pachachi; Adnan Pachachi

Nadim al-Pachachi (Arabic: نديم الباجه جي; 18 March 1914 – 29 February 1976) was an Iraqi politician and the Secretary-General of OPEC from January 1971 until December 1972.

Born in Baghdad during the Ottoman Empire, he received a doctorate in petroleum engineering and worked in the Rumalia oil fields as a young man. He served as the Minister of Economy in the Iraqi government from 1952 until 1957. He was Minister of Finance first time in December 1957, and second time from May 1958 to July 1958. He was arrested during the 14 July Revolution in 1958.

He later served as an advisor to the Libyan government and was very supportive of the Tripoli settlement of 20 March 1971 undertaken by the Muammar Gaddafi government. Pachachi then secretary-general of OPEC congratulated Libya on their "satisfactory price settlement" with the oil firms. "This agreement represents an improvement over the Tehran terms (between the Persian Gulf states and the Oil firms)." Pachachi said that the Libyan agreement incorporated a permanent freight differential of 69 cents per barrel. "On top of this permanent contractuel freight advantage currently enjoyed by Libyan crudes to 94 cents per barrel." The Libyan agreement also included a 10 per cent barrel premium in respect of low sulphur, Pachachi said "the Oil companies have a long tradition of resisting any adjustment in posted prices to reflect this advantage." He went on to say "in my view an equitable adjustment of their prices is essential." When asked if the rise in Oil prices set by the Tehran and Tripoli settlements in 1971, would have an adverse effect not only on Western nations but also on underdeveloped oil consuming countries with acute foreign exchange problems, Pachachi replied "We do realise that the developing countries as well as the industrialised nations will have to pay more for their oil exports. We, as developing countries sympathise with them. We, like them, are raw material producers, trying to get an equitable price for the primary product on which our economies depend. They too should use our example in getting the industrialised countries to pay a better price for their raw materials and primary commodities in general. And, we in OPEC are always ready to cooperate with other developing countries, and/or commodity price stabilisation organisations, and to put our experience at their disposal."

On August 16, 1971, US President Richard Nixon in an attempt "to defend the dollar" from the "intrigues of international speculators", declared a "suspension of the convertibility of the dollar into gold." This news created shockwaves in the oil producing countries, since most of them have their tax and revenue payments tied firmly to the dollar, and they held considerable dollar balances. Pachachi reacted to this move by Nixon stating that it was "unfair, illogical and quite simply intolerable that the oil producing countries should have to bear the final cost of US national policies, such as the Vietnam War and aid to Israel, of which we strongly disapprove."

After stepping down as secretary-general in December 1972, Pachachi remained deeply involved in oil politics, suggesting in May 1973 that Arab states should freeze oil sales to all states which supported Israel, until the occupation of all Arab territories was ended. On September 19, 1973, less than a month before the Yom Kippur War, Pachachi stated in a BBC interview that "oil is a political weapon against the US" and that Arab oil producing countries were convinced that their use of the product as a political weapon would in the end force the United States to change its policy towards Israel and the Middle East conflict. "We have this weapon and there is no reason why we should not use it," he said. Asked whether he did not think, in view of Western efforts to increase exploitation of their own resources, that the Arabs had missed their chance, Dr. Pachachi said he was totally unimpressed by Western hopes for self-sufficiency. Pachachi said that British North Sea oil and American new fields would hardly be able to keep up with the increase in demands over the coming years, let alone meet demands which already exist.

During the Yom Kippur war, the Organization of Arab Petroleum Exporting Countries proclaimed an oil embargo which led to the 1973 oil crisis. This was in response to Operation Nickel Grass. It lasted until March 1974. In December 1973, Pachachi spoke out in support of the embargo stating "Arab countries are expected, or considered morally obliged, to cater for the growing energy needs of the United States which blindly supports and abets the arch enemy of the Arabs (Israel)... In my opinion this moral responsibility on the part of the Arab oil-producing countries should cease to exist, if the United States continues with its pro-Israeli policy and the rest of the world community remains silent, or at best adopts resolutions merely condemning Israel's actions while Israel continually defies and ignores such resolutions." To put pressure on the US Pachachi proposed that all Arab oil-producing countries should adopt a "co-ordinated, unified policy to freeze their crude oil production at present levels until Israel withdraws fully from all Arab territories."

Nadim al-Pachachi died on 29 February 1976 at the age of 61, after skiing accident in Switzerland.
