= Adnan Pachachi =

Iraqi politician and statesman (1923–2019)

- عدنان الباجه جي
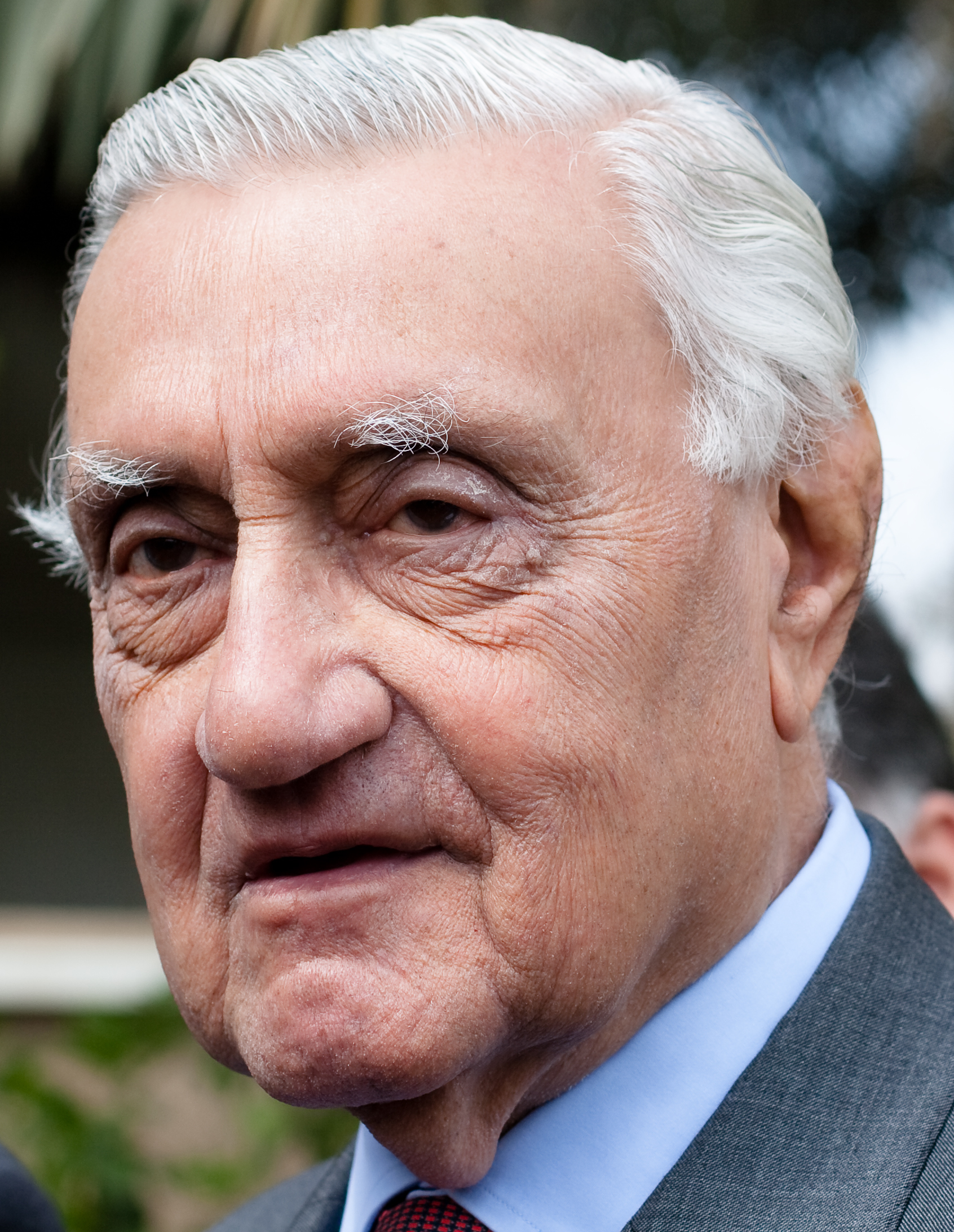
- Pachachi in March 2010

Foreign Minister of Iraq
- In office 11 December 1965 – 10 July 1967
- Preceded by: Abd al-Rahman al-Bazzaz
- Succeeded by: Ismail Khairallah (acting)

Personal details
- Born: 14 May 1923 Baghdad, Mandatory Iraq
- Died: 17 November 2019 (aged 96) Abu Dhabi, United Arab Emirates
- Party: Assembly of Independent Democrats
- Education: American University of Beirut

Adnan Muzahim Ameen al-Pachachi (Arabic: عدنان الباجه جي) (14 May 1923 – 17 November 2019), better known as Adnan Pachachi, was an Iraqi politician and statesman who served as Iraq's Permanent Representative to the United Nations (1959–1965 and 1967–1969) and foreign minister (1965–1967).

After 1971, he left Iraq in exile and became an Emirati Minister of State and political advisor to United Arab Emirates president Sheikh Zayed bin Sultan Al Nahyan. Following the 2003 U.S. invasion of Iraq, Pachachi was an important figure in Iraqi politics, often described as Iraq's elder statesman. He rejected the role of president in the Iraqi Interim Government.

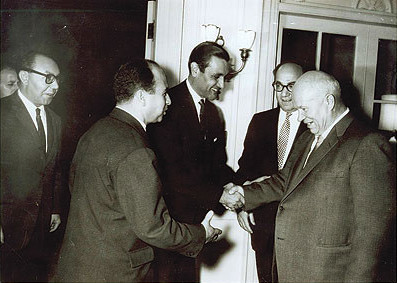
Adnan Pachachi and Krim Belkacem meeting with Nikita Khrushchev, leader of the Soviet Union, in 1960

== Childhood and education ==
Pachachi was born in Baghdad on 14 May 1923. As the son of Muzahim al-Pachachi, nephew of Hamdi al-Pachachi and the cousin of Nadim al-Pachachi, he was the scion of a Sunni Arab nationalist family with a long tradition in Iraqi politics and a graduate from Victoria College, Alexandria in Egypt. He supported the 1941 Iraqi coup d'état led by Rashid Ali Al-Gaylani as a member of the Kata'ib al-Shabab (Youth Brigade).

Pachachi completed his undergraduate studies in 1943 at the American University of Beirut in Lebanon, majoring in political science. While attending the university, he was inspired by the early emergence of the Arab Nationalist Movement on the campus. After his return to Iraq, his application for a job in the Ministry of Foreign Affairs was refused by the Iraqi Criminal Investigation Department due to his participation in the Kata'ib al-Shabab and support for the 1941 coup.

== Diplomatic and political career in Iraq ==
Eventually, in 1950, he was appointed assistant director of the Political Department in the Iraqi Ministry of Foreign Affairs and continued to work in the Foreign Service over the next eight years. In 1958, the union of Egypt and Syria was led by Gamal Abdel Nasser and the United Arab Republic was founded. Pachachi had been a vocal supporter of Nasser, particularly during the Suez War in 1956 although official Iraqi government policy at the time was aligned with the British against him. On his attraction to the Egyptian leader he wrote in his memoir "My feelings about Egypt and Jamal Abdul Nasser had deep-rooted origins. In the first place I shared my father's belief that Egypt was the most important Arab country and that Iraq should at all times should have the best relations with her. My father, in and out of power, consistently called for the closest ties with Egypt. It cost him his political career in 1950. He remained very close to Abdul Nasser and supported him during the fateful days of the Suez War. Being a fervent Arab nationalist, I was naturally attracted by Nasser's call for Arab unity, and during the Suez crisis I supported him without reservation. I admired Abdul Nasser because he personified more than anyone, the idea or Arab unity and seemed the only leader capable of achieving it." It was for this reason he was not trusted by Prime Minister Nuri as-Said and deemed to be a Nasserist. On 13 July 1958 he was dismissed and removed from the Iraqi Foreign Service due to his pro-Nasserite positions.

The very next day was the 14 July Revolution led by Abdul Karim Qassim. The Hashemite monarchy and Nuri as-Said were overthrown. Pachachi was promptly appointed Iraq's Permanent Representative to the United Nations in 1959 by Qassim's revolutionary regime. During this time Iraq formed a close relationship with the Soviet Union led by Nikita Khrushchev. Under Qassim, Iraq was a founding member of the Non-Aligned Movement in 1961 and Pachachi met with founding leaders Josep Broz Tito, Kwame Nkrumah, Jawaharlal Nehru, Fidel Castro, and Sukarno as a representative of his country. During his time at the United Nations he also met with well-known figures such as Patrice Lumumba and Malcolm X. The Qassim regime recognised the People's Republic of China and Pachachi argued very strongly for their inclusion at the United Nations. Despite the brutal 1963 coup which removed Qassim from power in Iraq, Pachachi remained the representative at the United Nations.

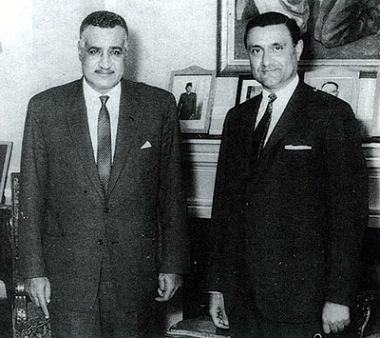
Pachachi (right) with Gamal Abdel Nasser (1966)

Pachachi wrote extensively about his time at the UN in his memoir, Iraq's Voice at the United Nations: 1959-1969. He expressed his dismay at the influence of the Zionist lobby over western media and speculated on the reasons for the support displayed for Israel. "The press of many Western countries abound with news commentaries and photographs extolling Israel's achievements and exploits, and scarcely hiding the perverse and malicious pleasure felt at the new tragedy that has befallen the people of Palestine. What can the meaning of all this be? Perhaps, in due course, some introspective and compassionate minds in the West might invest some time in soul-searching to analyse this curious phenomenon of Western, almost tribal, jubilation at Arab agony. Can it be that the temporary triumph of Zionist arms offers emotional compensation to some sections of the Western public for the post-Second World War retreat of Western colonialism before the advancing tide of Afro-Asian nationalism? Indeed, can we forget that Zionism is in fact chronologically the last wave of European demographic displacement at the expense of an Afro-Asian people?"

Following the announcement of his departure from the United Nations in December 1965, Pachachi was presented with a plaque by the Palestine Liberation Organization (PLO) "in recognition and appreciation of his dedication to and distinguished services for Palestine in the United Nations." The PLO was considered by the United States and Israel to be a terrorist organization until the Madrid Conference in 1991 but has enjoyed observer status at the United Nations since 1974. Pachachi was then appointed Foreign Minister of Iraq in 1965 by President Abdul Salam Arif; he stated the belief that his appointment to this position was at the behest of Gamel Abdel Nasser. Pachachi served as the Foreign Minister of Iraq during the Six-Day War with Israel and on the eve of conflict at the 1345th meeting of the United Nations Security Council on 31 May 1967, he announced:

"We shall defend ourselves whatever the cost and however long and difficult the struggle may be. We are prepared to use every tool at our disposal. The conflict will be total and uncompromising. The day before I left Baghdad, my government decided to deny our oil resources to any state which takes part in or supports the Israeli aggression against the Arab states. We have invited all other Arab oil-producing and exporting countries to meet with us and co-ordinate our positions. This must prove that our people are prepared to bear any hardship and accept any sacrifice. But there will be no retreat. Make no mistake about that; make no miscalculations. For fifty years we witnessed the Zionist peril steadily advancing. From a mere promise given by a colonial power in time of war, Israel was able to carve for itself a precious part of our homeland, continually threatening and trying to intimidate our people with murderous attacks across the armistice lines which the Arab countries have not crossed once since 1949 but which the Israelis have crossed with their armies twelve times. And now they are not hesitating to threaten to unleash war on us, and maybe on the world, in order to keep their ill gotten gains."

Following the outbreak of war with Israel on 5 June, Iraq severed diplomatic relations with the United States, suspended oil shipments, refused to permit U.S. aircraft to overfly Iraq, and announced a boycott of U.S. goods. Pachachi later denounced the ceasefire which ended the Six-Day War, dismissing it as a "complete surrender to Israel." In his memoirs Pachachi described the Arab defeat in 1967 as "a traumatic experience from which I never really recovered." He then served as Permanent Representative to the UN for a second time from 1967 to 1969. The Ba'ath Party came to power in July 1968, in a coup which Pachachi claimed was supported by the CIA, in an effort to distance Iraq from Gemal Abdel Nasser. Pachachi resigned from his post in January 1969 because as he put it "I felt it was morally wrong to represent a regime whose values I don't share." At the United Nations he was remembered for his rejections of Zionism and his refusal to recognise Kuwait. He then left Iraq in 1971.

== Exile and Diplomatic career in the UAE ==
He went into in exile in Abu Dhabi, which had become independent. Sheik Zayed appointed Pachachi as Minister of State in the first Government of the Emirate of Abu Dhabi; he took up his office on 1 July 1971. When the United Arab Emirates was formed on 2 December 1971, Pachachi immediately flew to New York and submitted the UAE's application for membership in the United Nations. Given his long career as Iraq's foreign minister and UN ambassador, Pachachi had many colleagues and contacts at the UN. "I saw that I had to convince two important permanent members of the Security Council, China and the Soviet Union, not to veto our application," he recalled. "At the time, there were close relations with the Communist Party in the south of Yemen, who opposed the creation of the UAE," he said. "So I had long talks with them, and assured them that the UAE would not enter into any anti-Communist alliances, would not be bound by any treaty obligations, and would join the ranks of the non-aligned countries." In 1973, as a result of US military support for Israel in the October War the UAE imposed an oil embargo, a move followed by other Arab oil-producing countries, and Pachachi was selected as the spokesman to convey Sheikh Zayed's message at the European Summit in Copenhagen. "We told them the embargo was imposed because of the large-scale military assistance given to Israel by the US, and we demanded justice for the Palestinians and the settlement of the conflict on the basis of total withdrawal of Israeli forces from Arab territories occupied in the 1967 war," he said. Pachachi was granted UAE citizenship in 1974 and served on the board of directors for entities including Abu Dhabi National Oil Company (Adnoc), the Abu Dhabi Investment Authority (Adia), and the Abu Dhabi Fund for Economic Development. He was also a member of the Abu Dhabi Executive Council and chairman of the General Projects Committee.

He described himself as a fervent Arab nationalist. In his memoirs he wrote that he was unable to accept Israel's existence and that Iraq and Syria should unite into one Arab state. During the Gulf war he wrote: "Whatever the outcome of the Kuwait crisis, the Arabs must continue their efforts to build a credible military alternative. The first imperative step toward reaching this goal is to achieve unity between Iraq and Syria. Without the unity of these two countries, the Arabs can never successfully resist Israel's armed might." Pachachi publicly opposed the Iraq Liberation Act of 1998 and only renounced his nearly 40-year-old view that Kuwait was part of Iraq in 1999.

== Events of 2003–2004 ==
In February 2003 he reportedly described the George W. Bush administration's foreign policy hawks as a "Zionist lobby". Pachachi dismissed US plans to redraw the map of the Middle East to benefit Washington and set up an American military administration in Baghdad. "These statements come from the Zionist lobby in the United States which thinks that overthrowing Saddam Hussein will bring Arab reconciliation with Israel. That is stupid because if a democratic regime is created in Iraq, it will display greater hatred for Israel. This lobby is opposed to me playing any role in Iraq, through the instigation of Ahmad Chalabi," Pachachi said. Unlike Chalabi, who had sought the support of the American Israel Public Affairs Committee, Pachachi said there would not be any relations between Iraq and Israel, as this would be antithetical to Iraqi interests.

On 15 February 2003, David Frum, a speechwriter for US President George W. Bush, who authored his "axis of evil" speech, described Pachachi as "an old-fashioned pan-Arabist." Frum stated "Mr. Pachachi is more than 80 years old and in many ways a very disturbing figure – for three decades he advocated the annexation of Kuwait to Iraq." On 24 February 2003, Jed Babbin the United States Deputy Undersecretary of Defense described Pachachi as "an octogenarian Arab-nationalist hostile to the U.S." going on to state that "For 30 years, Pachachi insisted that Kuwait was part of Iraq, and not entitled to independence. Now, he refers to Bush administration hawks as a 'Zionist lobby'. Offering Pachachi a part in the new Iraq makes as much sense as inviting in one of the Iranian mullahs."

Pachachi had strongly opposed the invasion and occupation of Iraq and was involved in creating an exile deal that the UAE offered Saddam Hussein in a last minute effort to avoid the impending war and suffering of the Iraqi people. Saddam allegedly accepted the offer to try to halt the invasion and bring elections to Iraq within six months, according to Mohammed bin Zayed Al Nahyan; however, the invasion still went ahead. In February 2003, Pachachi refused a seat on the US-appointed six-member leadership council set up at a meeting of major opposition groups in the Kurdistan Region of northern Iraq.

Pachachi vocally opposed the process of awarding out contracts to US firms after the ousting of the Ba'ath regime and criticised Washington over the plans for a US-led civilian authority to hand out reconstruction contracts without the approval of an elected Iraqi government. In April 2003, the US government awarded the Bechtel Corporation a $680-million-contract to help rebuild Iraq's power, water and sewage systems as well as repair air and sea ports, Pachachi slammed this decision saying "No one has the right to commit Iraq to obligations and costs, only an Iraqi government can do that. A parliament should also endorse the agreements."

After much deliberation Pachachi agreed to be part of the Iraqi Governing Council (IGC) in July 2003 at the age of 80. The CounterPunch journalist Andrew Cockburn commented on the IGC: "I think one person who deserves credit is Adnan Pachachi. From the beginning when they moved into Baghdad and seized nice houses, he was the only one that insisted on paying rent. He has always exhibited integrity." Following the establishment of the Governing Council, Joel Mowbray wrote in the National Review "Pachachi is one of a number of people with uncomfortably tight ties to terrorism. When he was the foreign minister of Iraq in the 1960s, Pachachi was very close to the first generation of Palestinian terrorists. And after the Baath Party had come to power, Pachachi refused to condemn the hanging of Jews in Baghdad in 1969." Pachachi was also denounced by a Middle East specialist at the CIA, Reuel Marc Gerecht, as "a surreal specimen of sclerotic Pan-Arabism from 30 years ago." The New York Times journalist Judith Miller dismissed the inclusion of Pachachi in the Iraqi Governing Council as a "diplomatic flap", claiming that his involvement in the political process "at this late stage would backfire politically and could alienate Kuwait, an essential base of operations in any gulf war." Danielle Pletka, vice-president for foreign and defense policy studies at the American Enterprise Institute (AEI), also denounced the inclusion of Pachachi in the IGC as "very disappointing".

Pachachi accused the US military of war crimes during the First Battle of Fallujah which was codenamed Operation Vigilant Resolve. In April 2004, during the US military operations in the city, he spoke out angrily claiming the actions taken by US forces were "illegal and totally unacceptable" he also accused them of "inflicting collective punishment on the residents of Fallujah" which is a war crime under the Fourth Geneva Convention. On 14 May, Michael Rubin of the American Enterprise Institute made clear his preference for Chalabi over Pachachi, writing "Chalabi may be a controversial figure and a lightning rod for criticism, but unlike figures like Muqtada al-Sadr and Abdul Aziz Hakim, Chalabi has always voiced his dissent peacefully. Unlike Adnan Pachachi, he has never called for the elimination of a neighboring Arab state or condemned the United States."

On 29 May 2004, Pachachi said, referring to the 2003 invasion of Iraq, "The Americans thought they were marching into an underdeveloped country, expecting to face little resistance and be welcomed with flowers. The Americans quickly realized that the Iraqi is a patriot, one who defends his country, just as his ancestors have done for thousands of years. We are an educated people with a long history, and we are a cultured people. The Americans also did not expect the infrastructure they found in Iraq. They were surprised. They couldn't understand that a dictator like Saddam Hussein had invested a large share of oil revenues in infrastructure projects, such as highways, modern irrigation canals and industrial plants, which one doesn't find in just any country. The marines were confused by this new realization, as well as by their failure to achieve a swift victory and by the ongoing resistance. It also confounded the American concept, that is, if a sound and credible concept ever existed. No people in the world wishes to live with occupiers, and we Iraqis are no different." Pachachi also commented on the Abu Ghraib torture and prisoner abuse "What kind of reaction do you expect from the Iraqis? Regardless of age, profession and political affiliation, we are all horrified and furious about these atrocities. I had already heard about the brusque approach taken by the Americans during house searches early on. However, I was completely taken aback by the gruesome scope of the torture and human rights violations that have now come to light. Not just I, but all Iraqis demand a tough investigation and punishment of the perpetrators and the people behind them. We also need guarantees that such atrocities will cease once and for all. What has happened cannot be undone, and the long-term psychological consequences are unforeseeable."

On 1 June 2004, he was reportedly nominated to be the President of the Iraqi Interim Government by UN Envoy Lakhdar Brahimi. He chose to decline the post publicly, stating that he turned down the position "because I was accused of being the choice of the Americans. I had to refuse this offer, in order to preserve my reputation and my honor. Trying to portray me as a little soft on the Americans when I have been struggling for Arab rights all my life is not only false, it is unfair. I find it really insulting." Pachachi later claimed he was forced to turn down the job because of a "shabby conspiracy" led by Chalabi. He said "There is a great deal of disinformation that I was the preferred candidate of the US. Nothing could be further from the truth." Paul Bremer in his memoirs indicated that Presidentr Bush himself urged the appointment of Ghazi al-Yawar as President of the Iraqi Interim Government, as Bush "had been favorably impressed by Ghazi's open thanks to the Coalition for overthrowing Saddam and by his determination to continue the process to sovereignty and eventual democracy." Brahimi promptly announced his resignation as UN Envoy, resulting from "great difficulties and frustration experienced during his assignment in Iraq." He expressed serious disappointment and frustration about his role stating "Bremer is the dictator of Iraq, He has the money. He has the signature. I will not say who was my first choice, and who was not my first choice. I will remind you that the Americans are governing this country."

=== Political activity after 2005 ===
Pachachi put together a list of candidates called the Assembly of Independent Democrats (his party Democratic Centrist Tendency was included) to contest Iraq's January 2005 legislative election. Prior to the elections, Pachachi accused the United States of interfering in Iraq's affairs by insisting that the 30 January election go ahead on that date. Sunni Arab political and religious leaders, including Pachachi, called for a six-month delay arguing that the violence sweeping the country meant a free poll could not go ahead. "The strange thing is that America and Iran, who differ on everything, agree on one issue of holding elections on January 30," Pachachi told reporters. "It is not the business of the United States or Iran or any other country to talk about delaying or sticking to the date. We are very upset by such attempts as foreign states sharing their opinion in this issue. Let us try to agree among ourselves because external attempts might deter any agreement."

In May 2005 he commented "The current situation in this country is very serious, the security is terrible, the services are almost non-existent the provision of the essentials is extremely inadequate. There is rampant corruption and selfishness the Iraqi political class is only a bit better than that of the Congo."

For the December 2005 elections, he was elected as a member of the list headed by former Prime Minister Ayad Allawi. Following Arab political tradition, Pachachi opened the first session of the Iraqi National Assembly in April 2005, as the oldest member elected.

At the time of the March 2010 parliamentary election, Pachachi again stood as a candidate on Allawi's Iraqi List. He expressed serious concerns about the credibility of the election: "There have been wide reports of intimidation of voters; there are certain to be attempts at voter fraud." Pachachi suggested that the government could be planning fraud due to its alleged printing of seven million unnecessary ballots. Nevertheless, he was hopeful, arguing that voters were more interested in the candidates' ability than in sectarian concerns and that "if they are allowed to [vote] without intimidation or fear, this could be a watershed moment and an example to the rest of the Middle East." However, after the elections in August 2010, he said "The idea that Iraq is being left in a good position is utter nonsense," and American officials should not "delude themselves." Later in August 2010, he was interviewed on the Al Jazeera programme Without Borders. When asked if he was satisfied with the performance of Paul Bremer as civilian administrator in Iraq, Pachachi replied "No, Bremer was receiving his instructions from the Pentagon and as I told you the Pentagon is controlled by a group of Zionist extremists." In August 2011 he said "The biggest beneficiaries of the deteriorating conditions of the Iraqi army and the elimination of Iraq's military power are Iran and Israel. As it stands there is no opposition to Iranian influence nor a deterrent to Israel's policy in the region." In December 2012, Pachachi told Al Arabiya that "Iraq is a failed state and in need of a revolution" further lamenting "Sorrow fills my heart that the Arab Spring has skipped Iraq. The wind of change that toppled regimes and rulers didn’t reach the country." He went on to blame the US invasion for the current state of the country and rampant sectarianism within it, stating "The Americans allowed a sectarian-based political system due to their beliefs that Iraqis are divided by their sectarian and ethnic background and that the political assembly must represent this truth. What the Americans did not understand was that Iraq long witnessed intermarriage between Sunnis and Shiites." As someone who has witnessed so much, and was involved in some of the most intense negotiations and treaties, he says one of his regrets is not seeing a different union succeed. "It is such a shame that Iraq and Syria did not unite, becoming the powerful heart of the Middle East. Instead, these two great nations, with such a great civilisation and such great hopes, became the heartache of the region," he says.

== Awards ==
Pachachi was awarded with Abu Dhabi Awards, Emirate of Abu Dhabi's highest civilian award, by Mohammad Bin Zayed Al Nahyan in 2016 for his services.

== Death ==
Pachachi died on 17 November 2019 in Abu Dhabi, United Arab Emirates.

Political offices
Preceded by Abdul Aziz al-Hakim	President of the Governing Council of Iraq; 2004	Succeeded by Mohsen Abdel Hamid
