= Anglo-Iraqi Treaty of 1922 =

Treaty giving Britain control of Iraq's military and foreign affairs

Anglo-Iraq Treaty of 1922
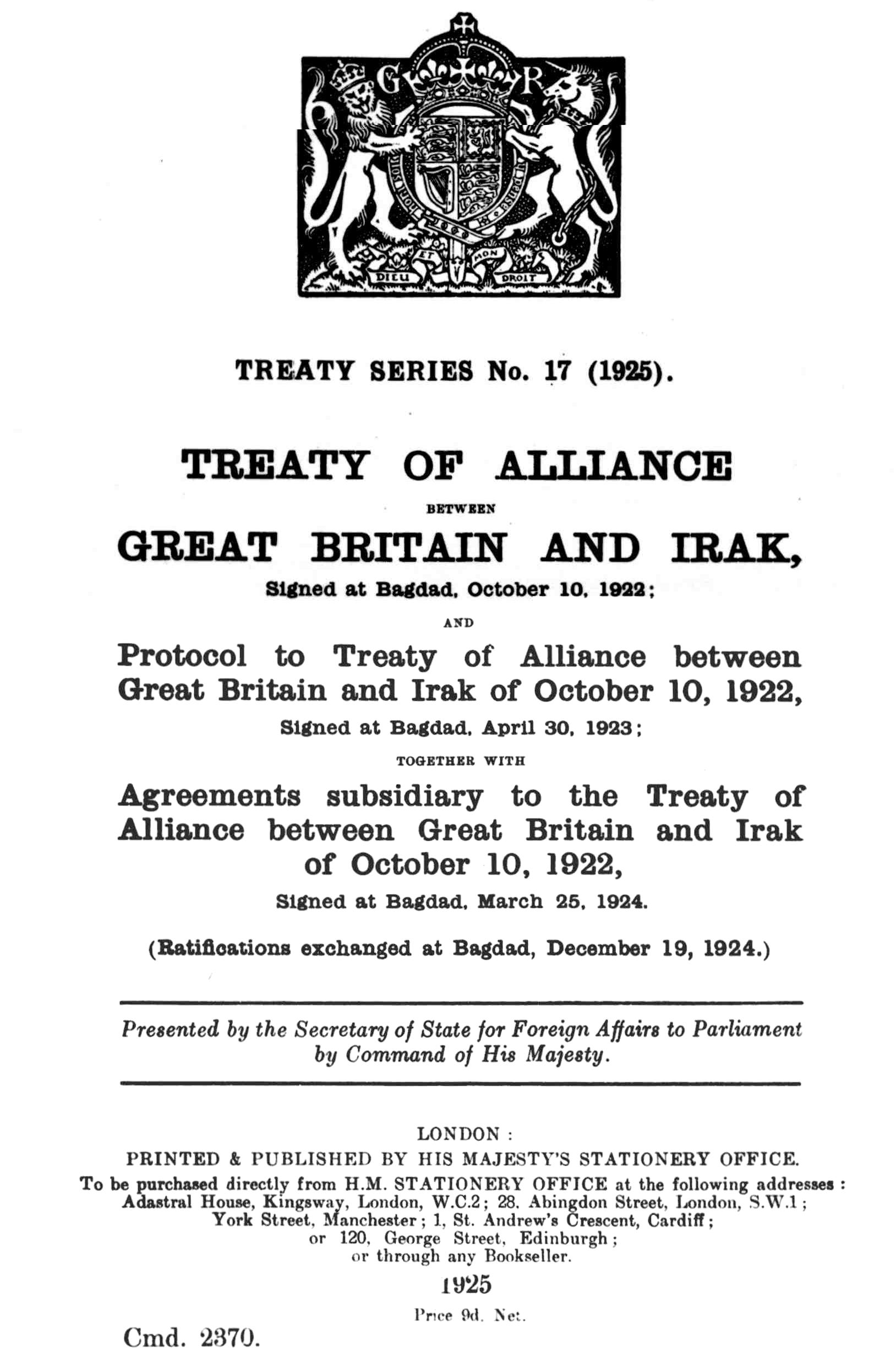
- The Anglo Iraq Treaty of 1922, Cmd 2370
- Created: 1922
- Ratified: 1924
- Signatories: Percy Cox and Abd Al-Rahman Al-Gillani
- Purpose: Codification of the British Administration of the newly created Kingdom of Iraq

The Anglo-Iraqi Treaty of October 1922 was an agreement signed between the British and the Iraqi governments. The treaty was designed to allow for Iraqi self-government and gave the British control of Iraq's foreign policy. It was intended to conclude an agreement made at the 1921 Cairo Conference to establish a Hashemite kingdom in Iraq.

== History ==
In the aftermath of the First World War, the former possessions of the Ottoman Empire were divided between the French and British, with the remainder becoming the present-day country of Turkey. The former Ottoman Iraqi provinces of Baghdad, Mosul and Basra were proposed to become a Class A League of Nations mandate under direct British rule, known as the British Mandate for Mesopotamia. The general public in the region reacted negatively to the mandate and resented the imposition of British control, which led to the Iraqi revolt of 1920. That caused the British to instead decide that the mandate territories would instead become the Kingdom of Iraq. On 23 August 1921, Faisal ibn Hasayn was crowned as Faisal I, King of Iraq.

Concurrently, the area acquired by the new kingdom was going through a period of political turmoil. Nationalists who had believed that the expulsion of the Ottomans would lead to greater independence were disappointed at the system of government that was decided for the British Mandate of Mesopotamia. Rather than the people of the region gaining a new sense of national identity through self-government, the British imported civil servants from British India who had previous knowledge and experience in managing the administration of an overseas possession.

The Anglo-Iraqi Treaty of 1922 served to prevent uprisings in the intended new Kingdom of Iraq by giving Britain direct control of the kingdom's military and significant influence over its economic and political affairs.

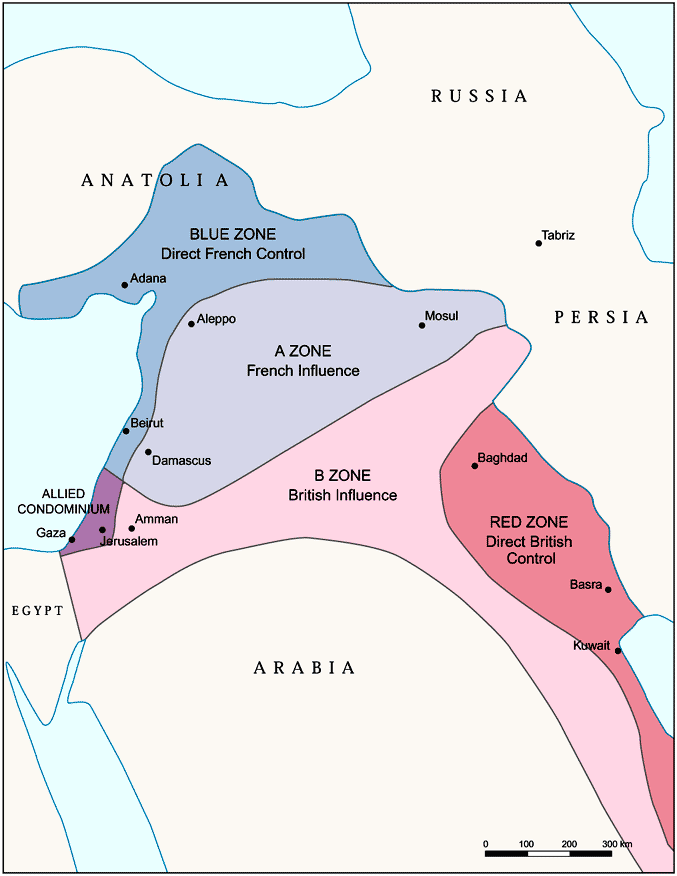
French interests in the Middle East in blue and British in red. The overlap in Palestine, marked in purple, was created to allow for a British railroad concession between the oil-rich Persian Gulf and the Levant and for the French to gain the former German railroad concessions between Aleppo and oil-rich northern Mesopotamia.

== Sykes-Picot Agreement ==
During the First World War, the Sykes–Picot Agreement had been struck between British and French diplomats on behalf of their respective governments on a vision of a postwar division of the Ottoman Empire in which the Arab provinces of the Ottoman Empire (south and west of Anatolia) would be split into spheres of influence for the French and the British:

That France and Great Britain are prepared to recognize and protect an independent Arab states or a confederation of Arab states (a) and (b) marked on the annexed map, under the suzerainty of an Arab chief. That in area (a) France, and in area (b) Great Britain, shall have priority of right of enterprise and local loans. That in area (a) France, and in area (b) Great Britain, shall alone supply advisers or foreign functionaries at the request of the Arab state or confederation of Arab states.

== Insurgency ==
The Anglo-Iraqi Treaty was signed mostly because the strenuous efforts of the people of the former Ottoman provinces, a coalition of both Sunni and Shia Arabs. Major centres of insurgency during what was later called the 1920 "Great Iraqi Revolution" included Baghdad, Najaf and Karbala. The insurgency effort in Karbala was inflamed by a fatwa issued by the grand mujtahid, Imam Shirazi. The fatwa made the observation that it was contrary to the principles of Islam for the region to be ruled by the British, who did not practice the religion, and it ordered a jihad against the British forces of occupation.

The Kurds in the northern part of the region also waged war against the British in the years after the signing and the ratification of the treaty. They sought separation from the newly-created Iraq and aimed to establish a separate homeland for themselves. Their efforts at revolt were tempered by the British, largely by air-to-ground attacks conducted by the Royal Air Force, but the aid of other Kurds in defeating the revolt was also of significant consequence.

== Cairo Conference ==
The 1921 Cairo Conference would set the stage for greater Iraqi autonomy. The British appointed Faisal ibn Hasayn to lead the country as the first King of Iraq. Faisal was seen as a compromise between British interests in the country and the revolutionary nationalists since he could trace his family lineage back to Muhammad and had having participated in the 1916-1918 Arab Revolt against the Ottomans. For their part, the British saw Faisal as a dependable ally, who would aid them in accomplishing their imperial goals.

== Signing ==
The treaty was controversial in Britain because of a very strong 'Quit Mesopotamia' (or 'Quit Iraq') movement. If Iraq had not ratified the treaty, Britain might have withdrawn from Iraq. The key player in obtaining the support was High Commissioner Sir Henry Dobbs, who took full advantage of the distance to make decisions and act in line with his own approach, rather than London's. The treaty was signed on behalf of the British by Sir Percy Cox on 10 October 1922. However, it was not ratified by the Iraqi government until 1924. It was only after Dobbs had threatened to wield his authority to scrap the constitution, which had been drafted by the Iraqi Constituent Assembly, that the treaty was finally ratified.

It was seen with disdain by many people, both Sunni and Shia, of the new kingdom. It was the first step towards complete independence from the imperial powers but also made Iraq a British client state.

== Suspension ==
The treaty was eventually suspended upon the signing of the Anglo-Iraqi Treaty of 1930.

== See also ==
- Anglo-French Declaration
- Anglo-Iraqi Treaty of 1930
- British-Iraqi relations
- British Mandate of Mesopotamia
- RAF Iraq Command
- Faisal I of Iraq
- Iraq
- Mesopotamia

== Surces ==
- The History Guy accessed on 13 April 2008.
- Encyclopaedia of the Orient accessed on 9 August 2007.
- Chronological Table of Middle East History accessed on 9 September 2007.
- Encyclopædia Britannica
- Wilks, Ann. "The 1922 Anglo-Iraq Treaty: A Moment of Crisis and the Role of Britain’s Man on the Ground." British Journal of Middle Eastern Studies 43.3 (2016): 342-359.

This article uses an image reproduced from http://www.passia.org with permission (Mahmoud Abu Rumieleh, Webmaster).
