= Ali Jawdat Al-Ayyubi =

Prime minister of Iraq variously in the 1900s

- علي جودت الايوبي
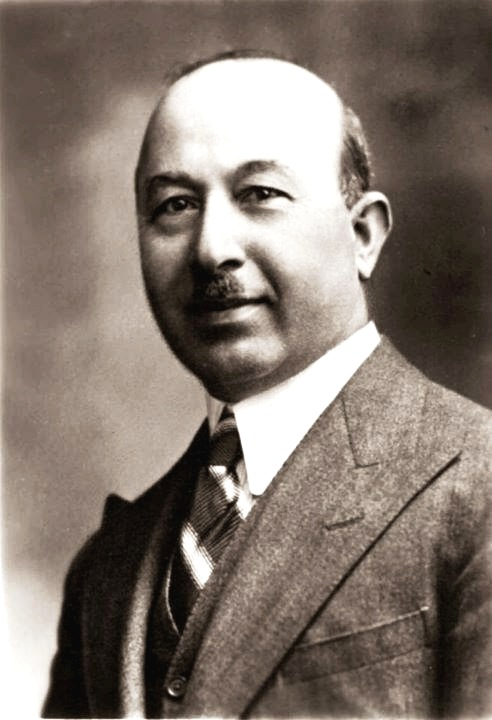

Prime Minister of Iraq
- In office 27 August 1934 – 4 March 1935
- Monarch: Ghazi I
- Preceded by: Jamil al-Midfai
- Succeeded by: Jamil al-Midfai
- In office 10 December 1949 – 5 February 1950
- Monarch: Faisal II
- Regent: Prince Abdullah
- Preceded by: Nuri al-Said
- Succeeded by: Tawfiq al-Suwaidi
- In office 20 June 1957 – 15 December 1957
- Monarch: Faisal II
- Preceded by: Nuri al-Said
- Succeeded by: Abdul-Wahab Mirjan

Personal details
- Born: 11 November 1886 Mosul, Ottoman Empire
- Died: 3 March 1969 (aged 82) Beirut, Lebanon
- Party: United National Front
- Spouse: Nazik Tahseen
- Children: Al-Hameed, Selwa and Nazar
- Occupation: Statesman; Diplomat

Ali Jawdat Al-Ayyubi (Arabic: علي جودت الأيوبي; November 11, 1886 – March 3, 1969) was Prime Minister of Iraq from 1934–1935, 1949–1950, and in the latter half of 1957.

== Early education and careers ==
Ali Jawdat Al-Ayyubi was born in Mosul in 1886 while Iraq was under Ottoman rule. His father served as a police sergeant, and upon retirement owned a grocery store. He was also purportedly a descendant of Saladin. At a young age, Ali was dispatched by his parents from the town of Beaji where they lived, on a ten-day boat trip to Baghdad, where he stayed in the care of an aunt and attended the Rashidiyeh military school. Upon graduation, he went by camel and ship to Istanbul where he attended the Military College with other Iraqis, including Ja'far al-Askari, Nuri al-Said, Jamil al-Midfai and Yasin al-Hashimi. With these latter, he fought during the First World War throughout the Arab lands for independence from Ottoman rule. Upon establishment in 1921 of the Kingdom of Iraq, with King Faisal I as its ruler, each served in turn in positions of leadership.

== Political career ==
Ali Jawdat served as Military Governor for Aleppo and Homs, during the short-lived tenure of the first Arab Kingdom of Syria, under King Faisal, and thereafter served in turn as Governor of Hillah, Najaf, Karbala, Mosul, Diyala, and Basra and variously as Minister of Finance, Minister of the Interior, Foreign Minister and Iraqi Ambassador to France and Washington, where he established the first Iraqi embassy in the United States. He served three times as Prime Minister (1934, 1949 and 1957), successively under King Faisal I, King Ghazi, and King Faisal II. He was the president of the Chamber of Deputies from March 1935 to August 1935.

The name “Jawdat” was given to him by his teachers and colleagues, and it means “quality” in Arabic. An ardent Arab nationalist, he espoused an inclusionary, non-sectarian vision of Iraq, encompassing its various ethnicities, sects and tribes. He strove to achieve autonomy with the British Empire. British influence was perceived to be embodied principally in the acquiescent behavior of the Regent, Abd al-Ilah and occasionally of his friend Nuri al-Said. In 1930 he resigned as Minister of Finance in Nuri Pasha's cabinet in protest at the signing of the Anglo-Iraqi Treaty of 1930, which he followed by resigning from parliament in 1931.

Ali Jawdat was appointed prime minister in 1934 but was forced to resign the next year due to smear campaigns, he was then elected head of the parliament in 1935. On January 10, 1948, Ali Jawdat was once again appointed prime minister of Iraq, and he resigned on the 1st of February 1950. In his memoire he described his reasons for resigning as fallout between prince Abd al-Ilah and a delegation to Egypt which was led by deputy prime minister Muzahim al-Pachachi that reached a mutual agreement with Egypt that the prince didn't approve off.

Ali Jawdats' 3rd and last prime minister appointment came on 20 June 1957 in the wake of Nuri al-Said resigning over the public discontent with living conditions and Iraqi foreign policy with the Baghdad pact and Iraq's response to the Suez crisis . Ali Jawdat resigned the same year after a disagreement with the king regarding the dissolution if the parliament. The Iraqi monarchy, represented by King Faisal II, was soon after toppled in the 14 July Revolution in 1958 led by Abd al-Karim Qasim. Ali Jawdat survived the coup.

== Personal life ==
While Military Governor of Aleppo and Homs in 1919, he met and married Nazik Tahseen, and they had three children, Nizar, Selwa and Nameer. Ali Jawdat lived simply and modestly, and was recognized for his integrity, courage and dedication to Arab nationalism.

== Death ==
He died in Beirut on March 3, 1969, shortly after completing his memoire.
