= Tawfiq al-Suwaidi =

Iraqi politician and prime minister (1892–1968)

- توفيق السويدي
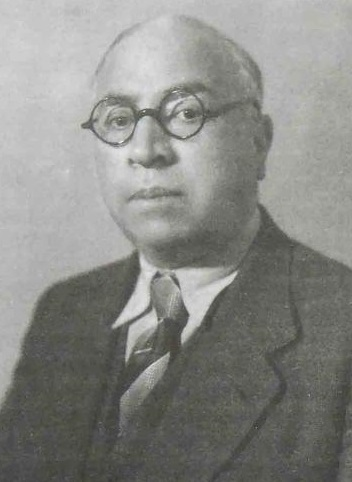

Prime Minister of Mandatory of Iraq Prime Minister of the Kingdom of Iraq
- In office 5 February 1950 – 15 September 1950
- Monarch: Faisal II
- Regent: Prince Abdullah
- Preceded by: Ali Jawdat al-Aiyubi
- Succeeded by: Nuri al-Said
- In office 23 February 1946 – 1 June 1946
- Monarch: Faisal II
- Regent: Prince Abdullah
- Preceded by: Hamdi al-Pachachi
- Succeeded by: Arshad al-Umari
- In office 28 April 1929 – 19 September 1929
- Monarch: Faisal I
- Preceded by: Abd al-Muhsin as-Sa'dun
- Succeeded by: Abd al-Muhsin as-Sa'dun

Personal details
- Born: 11 May 1892 Baghdad, Ottoman Iraq
- Died: 15 October 1968 (aged 76) Lebanon

Tawfiq al-Suwaidi (Arabic: توفيق السويدي; 11 May 1892 – 15 October 1968) was an Iraqi politician who served as Prime Minister of Iraq on three occasions between 1929 and 1950.

== Early life and education ==
Al-Suwaidi was born in Baghdad in 1892, he completed his early schooling at 16 and after a year in the local law college, travelled to Istanbul in 1909 where he continued his studies in the Istanbul College of Law. After graduating in 1912, Al-Suwaidi's was sent to the Sorbonne in Paris, by his father, to further his education. Al-Suwaidi returned to Iraq after finishing his studies in Paris in 1914. He joined the Ministry of Education as a secretary to the committee for the renovation of Shamsuddin Sami's famous French-Turkish Dictionary.

== Career ==
During the first world war, as well as working as a lawyer, Al -Suwaidi worked as a teacher in the Law college in Damascus, teaching Roman and general international law. He accepted these posts after rejecting a judgeship in Dair al-Zor and resigning from a judgeship in Damascus . Al-Suwaidi was said to prefer a professional salary paying position rather than a position of prestige in order to repay his father for his European education.

In 1928, upon the resignation of the Abdul Muhsin al-Sa'dun's ministry, Tawfik al- Suwaidi was appointed prime minister and called to form his first cabinet, which he assembled on 28 April. He became the youngest to hold the position in Iraq's history. His first premiership lasted only few months, in his memoire he suggested the reason might be the king didn't want to appoint him in the first place and preferred his successor Nuri al-Said.

Iraq was granted membership to the League of Nations in 1932 and due to his fluency in foreign languages, particularly French, the then diplomatic language, Tawfiq al-Suwaidi was chosen as Iraq's first permanent representative.

In February 23, 1946, Al-Suwaidi was once again appointed prime minister, which similarly lasted only few months, he resigned due to internal government disputes that were delaying the passing of the budget. Al-Suwaidi's 3rd and last premiership started on the 5th of February, it was marked by challenging attempts at coalition building between the various political parties, which lead al-Suwaidi to reportedly resign as soon as he felt there is enough stability for him to step back.

In addition to serving as prime minister, Al-Suwaidi also held posts as the Minister of Foreign Affairs, the Minister of Justice, the Controller general of state accounts; and separate from his ministerial roles, al-Suwaidi served as a member of the regency council (performing the duties of king or regent at times in which they were absent from the country), a leader of the Iraqi delegation to the league of nations and a leader of the delegation to the united nations. He was elected as the president of the Chamber of Deputies from November 1929 to November 1930.

He was Governor of the Central Bank of Iraq from 1948 to 1949.

In 1958, Tawfiq al-Suwaidi was selected as the Minister of Foreign Affairs under the Arab Federation. However, this post was dissolved when the royal regime fell in the 14 July Revolution. Because of his close ties to the crown, Suwaidi was arrested during the revolution that overthrew the monarchy. Sentenced to life in prison, he was pardoned in 1961 and went into exile in Lebanon, where he died in 1968. His body was moved to Baghdad for burial on the 16th of October.

Political offices
| Preceded by Abd al-Muhsin as-Sa'dun | Prime Minister of Iraq; April 28, 1929— August 25, 1929 | Succeeded by Abd al-Muhsin as-Sa'dun |
| Preceded by Hamdi al-Pachachi | Prime Minister of Iraq; February 23, 1946— May 31, 1946 | Succeeded by Arshad al-Umari |
| Preceded by Ali Jawdat al-Aiyubi | Prime Minister of Iraq; February 5, 1950— September 4, 1950 | Succeeded by Nuri as-Said |
