= Muzahim al-Pachachi =

Prime minister of Iraq from 1948 to 1949

Muzahim Ameen al-Pachachi
- مزاحم امين الباجه جي
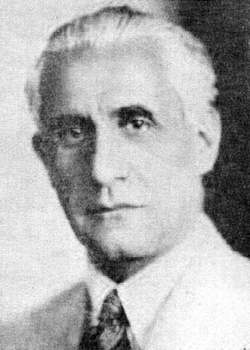

Prime Minister of Iraq
- In office 26 June 1948 – 6 January 1949
- Monarch: Faisal II
- Regent: Prince Abdullah
- Preceded by: Muhammad as-Sadr
- Succeeded by: Nuri al-Said

Personal details
- Born: 22 September 1890 Baghdad, Ottoman Empire
- Died: 23 September 1982 (aged 92) Geneva, Switzerland
- Party: Independent
- Relations: Hamdi al-Pachachi; Nadim al-pachachi
- Children: Adnan Pachachi

Muzahim Ameen al-Pachachi (Arabic: مزاحم الباجه جي; 22 September 1890 – 23 September 1982) was an Iraqi politician who served as Prime Minister of Iraq during the 1948 Arab-Israeli War.

== Biography ==
Born to a prominent family and graduated from the Baghdad School of Law he organized the Arab nationalist Cultural Club in Baghdad in 1912; its members included Hamdi al-Pachachi, Talib al-Naqib and Muhammad Ridha. In 1924, al-Pachachi was elected a member of the Constituent Assembly, charged with drafting the Constitution of Iraq. He held a number of cabinet and diplomatic positions.

Al-Pachachi served as Minister of Works (1924–25) before becoming a member of parliament (1925–27). He was appointed ambassador to Britain (1927–28) and was briefly Minister of the Interior (1930).

Al-Pachachi opposed the 1930 Anglo-Iraqi Treaty because it failed to meet nationalist demands. He held a succession of ambassadorial posts: ambassador to the League of Nations (1933–35), to Italy (1935–39), and to France (1939–42). During the 1930s he was under the surveillance of British intelligence services, declassified documents reveal that much to their chagrin he had close ties with the Soviet Union and the personal letters they have archived in his file show he was organizing with the League Against Imperialism and Virendranath Chattopadhyaya.

During the occupation of France in World War II, al-Pachachi stayed in Switzerland. He became active in the 1930s and 1940s in pro-Palestinian activities and opposed the 1948 United Nations truce in Palestine. The prime ministers of Iraq in 1948 were Sayyid Muhammad as-Sadr (January–June) and Muzahim al-Pachachi (June 1948-January 1949), both were distinguished personalities who were not part of the pro-British political circle and whose governments included ministers who identified with the anti-British elements. It was under the leadership of Pachachi that Iraq sent 18,000 troops to Palestine in the 1948 Arab-Israeli War, making them the largest Arab force there. It was also during this time that Iraq led the Arab Liberation Army.

On 14 July, Zionist activity in Iraq was made a crime punishable by death or life imprisonment by the Pachachi government. On 31 August 1948, Jamal al-Husayni, the Foreign Minister of the All-Palestine Government and brother of Hajj Amin al-Husayni stated "Fortunately el Pachachi happens to be Prime Minister. He is straightforward and good-hearted. He is now in the Lebanon and Syria to bring about the unification of their two armies." Al- Pachachi argued for the forming of a united military command for all of the Arab forces engaged in the 1948 Arab–Israeli War, he expressed bitter disappointment when the other Arab states turned down his proposal on 8 November. He stated on 29 December that "I believe war is the only means to save Palestine."

The al-Pachachi government also cut off the oil pipeline from northern Iraq to Haifa in protest against the Israeli declaration of independence, despite pressure from Britain, France and the United States. Stopping the oil pipeline cost Iraq £1,000,000 a year in lost revenue. Henry Mack, the British ambassador to Iraq was troubled by this, stating that the al-Pachachi's cabinet had an "intransigent attitude on Palestine." The eventual Iraqi defeats in Palestine brought down al-Pachachi’s government and his cabinet fell in January 1949. The new Prime Minister Nuri as-Said chose to withdraw the Iraqi troops from Palestine in March 1949. Al-Pachachi was later appointed deputy Prime Minister (1949–50) and Minister of Foreign Affairs (1949-50), he strongly opposed the 1949 Armistice Agreements signed by Jordan, Lebanon, Egypt and Syria with Israel.

Declassified documents from the period reveal Al-Pachachi was being very closely monitored by the CIA. The documents also reveal the extent of his opposition to Hashemite policies, his close relationship with the controversial Haj Amin al-Husseini, his absolute opposition to a ceasefire with Israel and his deep inner turmoil over Palestine. The documents describe him coming to blows with the Jordanian Prime Minister Tawfik Abu Al-Huda over Hashemite policy towards Palestine.

The Nakba was known to have effected al-Pachachi to such a large extent that the Iraqi poet Muhammad Mahdi Al-Jawahiri dedicated a poem to him entitled 'To al-Pachachi in his Nakba'. He also opposed the 1951 law that allowed Iraqi Jews to leave the country, although he himself left Iraq that year, returning after the 14 July Revolution in 1958. Although al-Pachachi was no longer active in Iraqi politics at the time, he was a close supporter of Gamal Abd al-Nasser and was present alongside him and Shukri al-Quwatli in Cairo at the signing of the unity pact between Syria and Egypt thus forming the United Arab Republic in February 1958. Al-Pachachi died in 1982 in Geneva.

His son Adnan later served as a cabinet minister and diplomat.

== Sources ==
- Ghareeb, Edmund A. Historical Dictionary of Iraq, pp. 179–80. Scarecrow Press, 2004, ISBN 0-8108-4330-7.
- "Central Intelligence Agency documents (1948) Arab League Political Committee Meetings" (PDF). foia.cia.gov. August 1948.
- Jawahiri, Mohammed Mahdi. "To Al-Pachachi in "his Nakba" "الى الباجه جي "في نكبته". konouz.com.
- Jawahiri, Mohammed Mahdi. "Al-Pachachi in the eye of the enemy الباجة جي في نظر الخصوم". abgad.com. Archived from the original on 2013-11-10.
