= Chamber of Deputies of Iraq =

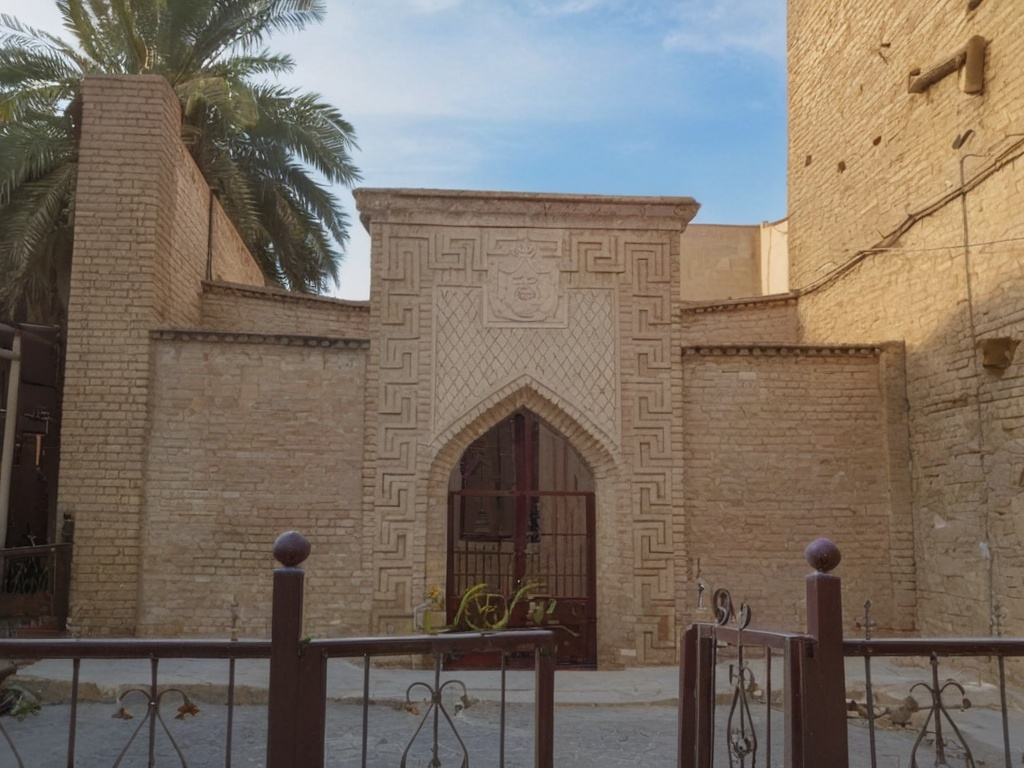
Building of the Chamber of Deputies

The Chamber of Deputies of Iraq (Majlis an-Nuwwab) was the elected lower house of the bicameral parliament established by the Mandatory Iraq's 1925 constitution. There were initially 87 deputies, who were elected The Chamber of Deputies remained in existence until the 1958 revolution. The number of deputies was later increased to 141.

== Presidents of the Constituent Assembly ==
Name	Took office	Left office	Notes
Abdul-Muhsin Al-Saadoun	March 1924	2 August 1924	

== Presidents of the Chamber of Deputies ==
Name	Took office	Left office	Notes
Rashid Ali al-Gaylani	July 1925	8 May 1926	
Hikmat Sulayman	8 May 1926	1 November 1926	
Rashid Ali al-Gaylani	1 November 1926	21 November 1926	
Abdul-Muhsin Al-Saadoun	27 November 1926	19 January 1928	
Abdul Aziz al-Qassab	19 January 1928	30 April 1929	
Abdul-Muhsin Al-Saadoun	30 April 1929	2 November 1929	
Tawfiq al-Suwaidi	2 November 1929	1 November 1930	
Ja'far al-Askari	1 November 1930	December 1930	
Jamil Al-Madfai	December 1930	1 November 1931	
Ja'far al-Askari	1 November 1931	30 November 1931	
Jamil al-Madfai	30 November 1931	November 1933	
Rashid al-Khoja	November 1933	February 1934	
Salman al-Barrak	1934	1934	
Rashid al-Khoja	29 December 1934	March 1935	
Ali Jawdat al-Ayyubi	March 1935	August 1935	
Muhammad Zaki Mahmud	4 August 1935	October 1936 - ?	
Nasrat al-Farisi	?	?	
Fakhri al-Jamil	27 February 1937	?	
Mawlud Mukhlis	December 1937	November 1941	
Hamdi al-Pachachi	November 1941	December 1943	
al Fariq Salih Saib	December 1943	December 1943	
Mohammed Ridha Al-Shabibi	December 1943	December 1944	
Muhammad Hassan Kubba	December 1944	December 1944	
Muhammad Amin Zaki	December 1944	June 1946	
?	?	?	
Abdul Aziz al-Qassab	17 March 1947	December 1948	
Abdul-Wahab Mirjan (Abdul Wahhab Marjam)	December 1948	September 1950	
Muhammad Fadhel al-Jamali (Fadel Al-Jamali)	October 1950	1 December 1951	
Abdul-Wahab Mirjan (Abdul Wahhab Marjam)	1 December 1951	27 October 1952	
Muhammad Fadhel al-Jamali (Fadel Al-Jamali)	24 January 1953	September 1953	
?	?	?	
Abdul-Wahab Mirjan (Abdul Wahhab Marjam)	1 December 1953	29 April 1954	
Abdul-Wahab Mirjan (Abdul Wahhab Marjam)	26 July 1954	3 August 1954	
Abdul-Wahab Mirjan (Abdul Wahhab Marjam)	16 September 1954	20 June 1957	
Izzuddin Mulla	1957	1958	
Khalil Kannah	14 February 1958	10 May 1958	
Abdul-Wahab Mirjan (Abdul Wahhab Marjam)	10 May 1958	14 July 1958	

== See also ==
- Kingdom of Iraq
- Senate of Iraq
