= Abdul Muhsin al-Sa'dun =

Four-time prime minister of Iraq in the 1920s

Sir Abdul Muhsin al-Sa'doun KCMG
- عبد المحسن السعدون
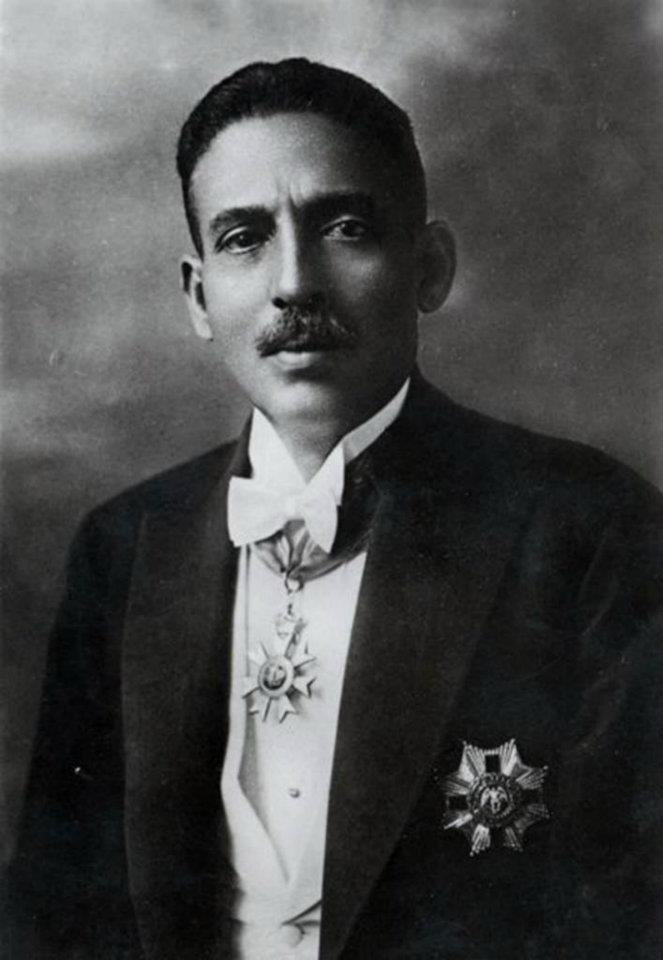

Prime Minister of Mandatory Iraq
- In office 19 September 1929 – 13 November 1929
- Monarch: Faisal I
- Preceded by: Tawfiq al-Suwaidi
- Succeeded by: Naji al-Suwaydi
- In office 11 January 1928 – 28 April 1929
- Monarch: Faisal I
- Preceded by: Ja'far al-Askari
- Succeeded by: Tawfiq al-Suwaidi
- In office 26 June 1925 – 21 November 1926
- Monarch: Faisal I
- Preceded by: Yasin al-Hashimi
- Succeeded by: Ja'far al-Askari
- In office 20 November 1922 – 22 November 1923
- Monarch: Faisal I
- Preceded by: Abd Al-Rahman Al-Gillani
- Succeeded by: Jafar al-Askari

Personal details
- Born: Abd al-Muhsin bin Fahad al-Sa'doun; 1879 Nasiriyah, Basra Vilayet, Ottoman Empire
- Died: 13 November 1929 (aged 49–50) Baghdad, Kingdom of Iraq
- Party: The Progressive Party
- Children: 2
- Education: Ottoman Military Academy

Military service
- Allegiance: Ottoman Empire
- Branch/service: Ottoman Army
- Rank: Binbashi (1905–1909); Second Lieutenant (1909)
- Unit: Infantry

Sir Abdul Muhsin al-Sa‘doun, KCMG (Arabic: عبد المحسن السعدون; 1879 – 13 November 1929) was an Iraqi politician who served as Prime Minister of Iraq on four occasions between 1922 and 1929.

== Background and early career ==
Abd al-Muhsin al-Sa'doun hailed from a family descended from the Sa’douns, the most powerful tribe within the Muntafiq Confederation. In the mid-nineteenth century, the Ottoman Empire fostered rivalries between the dominant Sa'dun chiefs by offering enticing land deals to the highest bidders among them, pursuant to a policy of tribal weakening and division. In 1871 Midhat Pasha finally split the chiefs in two between "Ottomanizers" and their opponents by offering some chiefs permanent ownership of once communal tribal lands, when, previously, they could only exact tribute from farmers. The tribal chiefs then grew very wealthy by converting the rest of the tribe into tenant farmers for their exploitation.

When the United Kingdom took Iraq from the Ottomans following World War I, it pursued a policy whereby it lavished political and economic favours on tribal leaders in order to encourage them to exert their influence in ways conducive to British economic designs in the country. Al-Sa'doun was one of many to consistently obtain seats in Parliament in exchange for this service. Notably, however, while many tribal leaders at the time were provincial in outlook, al-Sa'doun was distinguished by being a sayyid (a descent from the Prophet Muhammad), and by having broadened his horizons at the Military Academy in Istanbul. Al-Sa'doun served as a military officer during Ottoman control of the country, as an aide-de-camp to Sultan Abd-ul-Hamid II, and as a ten-year member of the Ottoman Parliament. Afterward, he returned to Iraq and embarked on a career as an influential politician.

== Time in Parliament ==
Al-Sa'dun was a shrewd politician with many tribal and British connections, as demonstrated by his control over the Parliamentary alliance known as the Progressives. This made him one of King Faisal's most bitter rivals, as he frequently acted as an instrument of British supremacy over the Iraqi interests Faisal was trying to pursue. In 1923, he suppressed a Shi'a movement calling for election boycotts. He was President of the Constituent Assembly in 1924. Then, in 1926, he assured the application of the unequal twenty-five-year "Financial and Military Agreement" between Iraq and Britain in spite of its unpopularity. He was appointed an Honorary Knight Commander of the Order of St Michael and St George in the 1926 Birthday Honours.

He was elected as the president of the Chamber of Deputies from 1926 to 1928 and in 1929.

During his third term as prime minister, al-Sa'doun also negotiated the Treaty of Ankara in which Iraq promised to pay Turkey 10% of its revenues from the Mosul oil fields in return for Turkish recognition of Iraqi control of the area. By December 1928, popular protest over British domination of Iraq had become more fervid, and al-Sa'doun began to support King Faisal's demands for more autonomy. He resigned in protest in January 1929.

== Death ==
On 13 November 1929, during his fourth term in office, al-Sa'doun died of a self-inflicted gunshot wound. His actions were considered to be a consequence of the criticism he had received from the Iraqi population and, subsequently, the British and international community for his "disloyalty". He left behind a letter to his son stating, "I have suffered with forbearance all possible insults and contempt".

== Legacy ==
In his memory, the street where he was died became known officially as "al-Sa'doun Street" and a bronze statue dedicated to him was built in the street.

Political offices
Preceded by Abd Al-Rahman Al-Gillani	Prime Minister of Iraq; 18 November 1922 – 21 November 1923	Succeeded by Jafar al-Askari
Preceded by Yasin al-Hashimi	Prime Minister of Iraq; 19 June 1925 – 1 November 1926	Succeeded by Jafar al-Askari
Preceded by Jafar al-Askari	Prime Minister of Iraq; 14 January 1928 – 20 January 1929	Succeeded by Tawfiq al-Suwaidi
Preceded by Tawfiq al-Suwaidi	Prime Minister of Iraq; 19 September 1929 – 13 November 1929	Succeeded by Naji al-Suwaidi
