= Hadid (name) =

Hadid is an Arabic given name meaning "iron"; Hadid and Al-Hadid are also Arabic surnames. Hadid may refer to:

- Barjas al-Hadid, Jordanian politician
- Bassam Abou Hadid, Egyptian footballer
- Diana al-Hadid, Syrian American artist
- Fahad Hadeed, Emirati footballer
- Ibn Abi'l-Hadid, 13th-century Islamic scholar
- Ibrahim al-Hadid, Syrian doctor and politician
- Leena Al-Hadid, Jordanian diplomat
- Mahmoud Al-Hadid, Jordanian football manager
- Marwan Hadid, Syrian militant leader and Islamic preacher
- Mohamed Hadid, Palestinian-American real estate developer
  - Gigi Hadid, American model and daughter of Mohamed Hadid
  - Bella Hadid, American model and daughter of Mohamed Hadid
- Mohamed Idir Hadid, Algerian footballer
- Mohammed Hadid, Iraqi-British politician
  - Foulath Hadid, Iraqi writer, accountant, expert on Arab affairs, and son of Mohammed Hadid
  - Zaha Hadid, Iraqi-British architect, and daughter of Mohammed Hadid
- Mousa Hadid, Palestinian political figure
- Muhammad Farid Abu Hadid, Egyptian writer, poet and historian
- Mustafa Hadid, Afghan former footballer
- Noureddine Hadid, Lebanese sprinter
- Tala Hadid, American film director and daughter of Foulath Hadid
- Yolanda Hadid, Dutch American television personality and former model

Hadid is also part of a patronymic name. When Hadid appeared after the proper name (in Arabic: ism), it usually meant the "son of Hadid", although in modern times the omission of Al makes the patronymic mixed up with the surname:

- Ahmed Hadid Al Mukhaini, Omani football player
- Osama Hadid Al-Mukhaini, Omani football player

== See also ==
- Haddad
- Hadidi (disambiguation)
