= Haddad =

Arabic surname

Origin
- Meaning: Locksmith, Blacksmith
- Region of origin: Levant

Other names
- Variant forms: Hadad, Hadodo

Haddad (Arabic: حدّاد, Syriac: ܚܕܕ or ܚܕܐܕ) is an Arabic surname meaning blacksmith, commonly used in the Levant and Algeria.

Hadad is the name of an ancient Semitic storm god. Hadodo (Syriac: ܚܕܕܐ) is an Assyrian family name, which has the same meaning in Turoyo.

== Persons with surname ==
=== Haddad ===
- Aaron Haddad (born 1982), American professional wrestler best known as Damien Sandow
- Abd al-Masih Haddad (1890–1963), writer of the Mahjar movement and journalist
- Amir Haddad (born 1984), Israeli French singer
- Amir-John Haddad (born 1975), German-Spanish flamenco guitarist and multi-instrumentalist
- Antoine Haddad (born 1954), Lebanese politician
- Andreas Haddad (born 1982), Assyrian Swedish footballer
- Beatriz Haddad Maia (born 1996), Brazilian tennis player
- Benjamin Haddad (born 1985), French politician
- Brendha Haddad (born 1986), Brazilian actress
- Caroline Haddad, Canadian competitive pair skater
- Dany Haddad (born 1960), Lebanese fencer
- Diana Haddad (born 1976), Lebanese singer
- Drew Haddad (born 1978), American football player
- Eddie Haddad (1928–1978), Canadian boxer
- Fawwaz Haddad (born 1947), Syrian novelist
- Fernando Haddad (born 1963), Brazilian academic and politician
- Fouad Haddad (1927–1985), Egyptian poet
- George Ibrahim Haddad, Jordanian writer, poet, and journalist
- Hicham Haddad, Lebanese comedian and TV show host
- Hoda Haddad (born 1944), Lebanese singer and actress
- Hubert Haddad (born 1947), Tunisian poet, playwright, and writer
- Humberto Hernandez-Haddad (born 1951), Mexican lawyer, Senator, and Federal Congressman
- Ibrahim Haddad (born 1938), Syrian politician and minister
- Ihsan Haddad (born 1994), Jordanian footballer
- Ilias Haddad (born 1989), Dutch-Moroccan footballer
- Isaac Haddad (died 1755), Tunisian Talmudic scholar
- Izz al-Din al-Haddad (1970–2026), Palestinian politician and militant
- Jamey Haddad (born 1952), American jazz percussionist
- Jerrier A. Haddad (1922–2017), computer engineer
- John G. Haddad Jr, American endocrinologist after whom the IBMS John G. Haddad Jr. Award was named
- Joumana Haddad (born 1970), Lebanese poet, translator, journalist, and women's rights activist
- Karim Haddad (born 1962), Lebanese composer
- Kasia Haddad (born 1979), British actress
- Lahcen Haddad (born 1960), Moroccan politician
- Lawrence Haddad (born 1959), British economist
- Line Haddad (born 1978), French-Israeli pair skater
- Maria Ziadie-Haddad (born 1955), Jamaican airline pilot
- Malek Haddad (1927–1978), Algerian poet and writer
- Michel Haddad (born 1902), Egyptian boxer
- Mohammed Haddad (born 1975), Bahraini composer and music critic
- Mohammed Ali Ahmed al-Haddad (1967–2025), Libyan lieutenant general, Chief of the General Staff of the Libyan Army
- Musue Noha Haddad, Liberian journalist and photojournalist
- Nabil Haddad, Jordanian Arab priest of the Melkite Greek Catholic Church
- Nadra Haddad, a Syrian poet of the Mahjar movement, and a founding member of The Pen League, the first Arabic-language literary society in North America
- Nouhad Wadie Haddad (born 1934 or 1935), known as Fairuz, Lebanese singer
- Óscar Bitar Haddad (born 1942), Mexican politician
- Paul Haddad (1963–2020), English-born Canadian actor
- Qassim Haddad (born 1948), Bahraini poet
- Radley Haddad (born 1990), American baseball coach
- Roger Haddad (born 1978), Swedish politician
- Rudy Haddad (born 1985), French-Israeli football player
- Saad Haddad (1936–1984), Lebanese militant
- Sami Haddad (born 1950), Lebanese businessman, politician, and government minister
- Sami Ibrahim Haddad (1890–1957), Lebanese physician and writer
- Shai Haddad (born 1987), Israeli footballer
- Sonya Haddad (1936–2004), American translator and surtitler
- Soraya Haddad (born 1984), Algerian judoka
- Tahar Haddad (1899–1935), Tunisian author, scholar, and reformer
- Vico Haddad (born 1960), Israeli footballer and sports manager
- Wadie Haddad (1927–1978), Palestinian former head of the armed wing of the PFLP
- Wassim Michael Haddad (born 1961), Lebanese-Greek-American mathematician, scientist, and engineer
- William J. Haddad (1915–2010), Canadian lawyer and jurist
- Yoseph Haddad (born 1985), Israeli Arab activist
- Yvonne Haddad, Syrian professor

=== Hadad ===
- Amir Hadad (born 1978), Israeli tennis player
- Astrid Hadad (born 1957), Lebanese-Mexican actress
- Aviv Hadad (born 1984), Israeli footballer
- Daniel Hadad (born 1961), Argentine telecommunication businessman
- Haneh Hadad (1919–2020), Israeli Arab politician and Member of the Knesset
- Mauricio Hadad (born 1971), Colombian tennis player
- Sarit Hadad (born "Sarah Hodadetova" 1978), Israeli singer

=== Al-Haddad ===
- Abdullah al-Haddad (1634–1720), Yemeni Islamic scholar
- Abdulrahman Al-Haddad (born 1966), Emirati footballer
- Izz al-Din al-Haddad (born 1970), Palestinian politician and militant
- Muayad Al-Haddad (born 1960), Kuwaiti footballer
- Saleh Al-Haddad (born 1986), Kuwaiti track and field athlete

=== El Haddad ===
- Andre El Haddad (born 1971), Lebanese football referee
- Essam El-Haddad (born 1953), Egyptian politician
- Gehad El-Haddad (born 1981), Egyptian political activist
- Laila el-Haddad, Palestinian freelance journalist, author, and media activist
- Mahmoud El-Haddad (born 1986), Egyptian weightlifter
- Saad El-Haddad, birth name of Baba Saad or just Saad, German rapper of Lebanese descent

=== Hadodo ===
- Naim Mikhail Hadodo, Assyrian politician, president of Mesopotamia National Council, successor of GHB
- Ignatius Habib Hadodo (born 1623), Syriac Orthodox Patriarch of Tur Abdin (1674–1707)

== Other ==
- Camilo Haddad station, a monorail station in São Paulo, Brazil
- Estádio Anísio Haddad, usually known as Rio Pretão, multi-purpose stadium in São José do Rio Preto, Brazil

== See also ==
- Hadad (disambiguation)
- Hadid (name)
