= 1948 Iraqi parliamentary election =

- 15 June 1948

All 138 seats in the Chamber of Deputies 70 seats needed for a majority
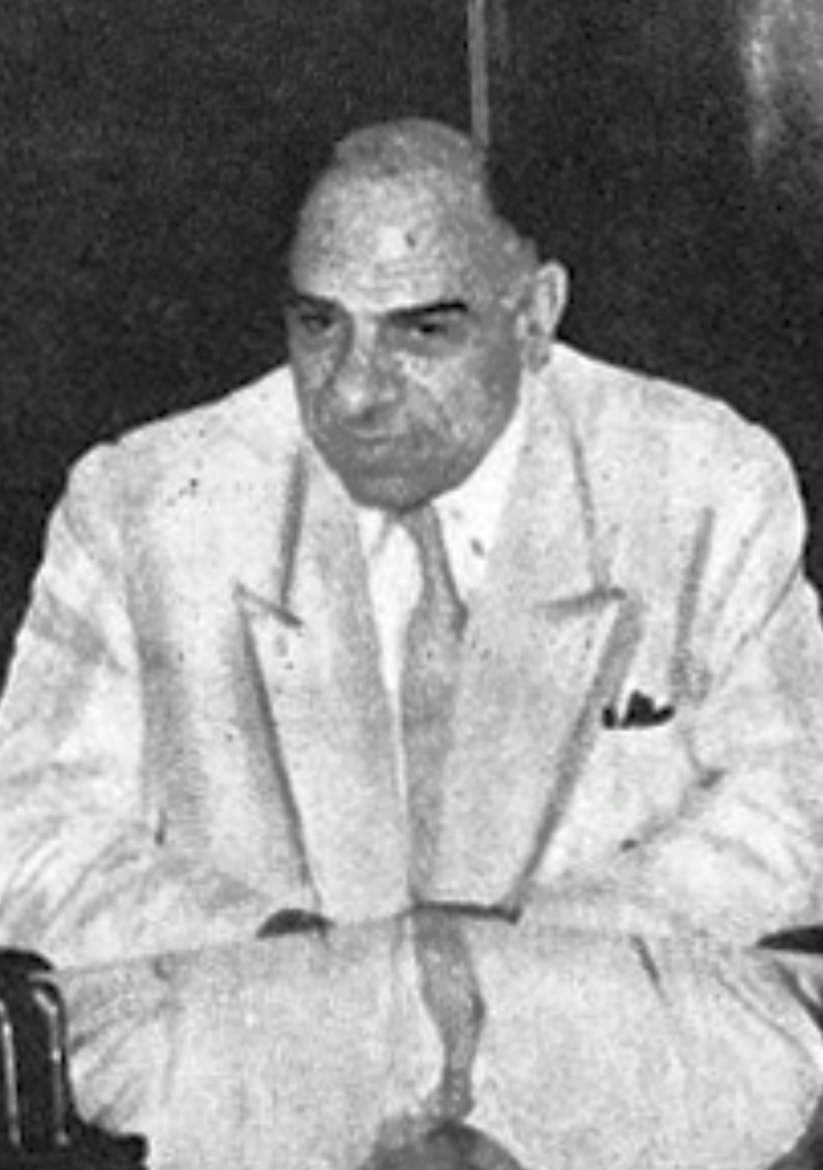

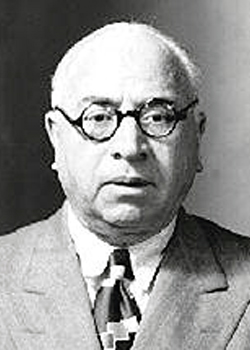
	First party	Second party	Third party
Leader	Muhammad Mahdi Kubba	Kamel al-Chaderji	Tawfiq al-Suwaidi
Party	Independence	NDP	Liberal
Seats won	5	2	1
Prime Minister before election
Muhammad as-Sadr
Independent
Subsequent Prime Minister
Muzahim al-Pachachi
Independent

Parliamentary elections were held in Iraq on 15 June 1948 to elect the members of the Chamber of Deputies. The majority of seats were won by independents.

== Results ==
Party	Seats
Iraqi Independence Party	5
National Democratic Party	2
Liberal Party	1
Independents	130
Total	138
Source: Nohlen et al.
