= Rifat Chadirji =

Iraqi architect (1926–2020)

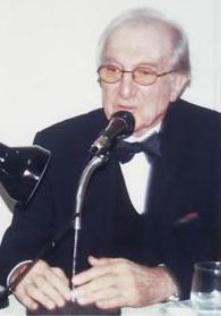
- Born: 6 December 1926; Baghdad, Mandatory Iraq
- Died: 10 April 2020 (aged 93); London, England
- Occupation: Architect
- Spouse: Balqees Sharara
- Parent: Kamil Chadirji (father)
- Relatives: Naseer al-Chaderchi (brother), Hayat Sharara (sister in law)
- Awards: Aga Khan Award for Architecture Tamayouz Lifetime Achievement Award
- Website: rifatchadirji.com

Rifat Chadirji (Arabic: رفعة الجادرجي, romanized: Rifa'ah al-Jādarjī, also Romanized Rifa'at Al Chaderchi; 6 December 1926 – 10 April 2020) was an Iraqi architect. He was often referred to as the father of modern Iraqi architecture, having designed more than 100 buildings across the nation.

== Early life ==
Chadirji was born in Baghdad in 1926 into an influential family. His father, Kamil Chadirji, played a central role in Iraq's political life as the founder in 1946 and then president of the National Democratic Party. His family was of Iraqi Turkmen origin.

Chadirji trained as an architect at the Hammersmith School of Arts and Crafts in London. In 1952, after completing his graduate training, he returned to Baghdad and began working on what he called his "architectural experiments" Chadirji's architecture was inspired by the modernist ideas of Le Corbusier and Walter Gropius blended with the time-tested intelligence inherent in regional Iraqi architecture. Athe same time, he wanted to reconcile tradition with contemporary social needs. In an interview, Chadirji explained his philosophy:

From the very outset of my practice, I thought it imperative that, sooner or later, Iraq create for itself an architecture regional in character yet simultaneously modern, part of the current international avant-garde style.

In the context of architecture, Chadirji called this approach international regionalism. Chadirji's approach was entirely consistent with the objectives of the Modern Baghdad Group, founded in 1951, of which he was an early member. This art group sought to combine ancient Iraqi heritage with modern art and architecture, to develop an Iraqi aesthetic that was not only unique to Iraq but also influenced the development of a pan-Arab visual language.

== Career ==
Chadirji's early works were firmly grounded in the discourse being conducted by members of the Baghdad Modern Art Group, including sculptors Jawad Saleem and Mohammed Ghani Hikmat, and artist-intellectual, Shakir Hassan Al Said. His designs relied on abstracting the concepts and elements of traditional buildings and reconstructing them in contemporary forms. However, Chadirji's critics have pointed out that although Chadirji was sympathetic to the group's aims, he was essentially a modernist at heart.

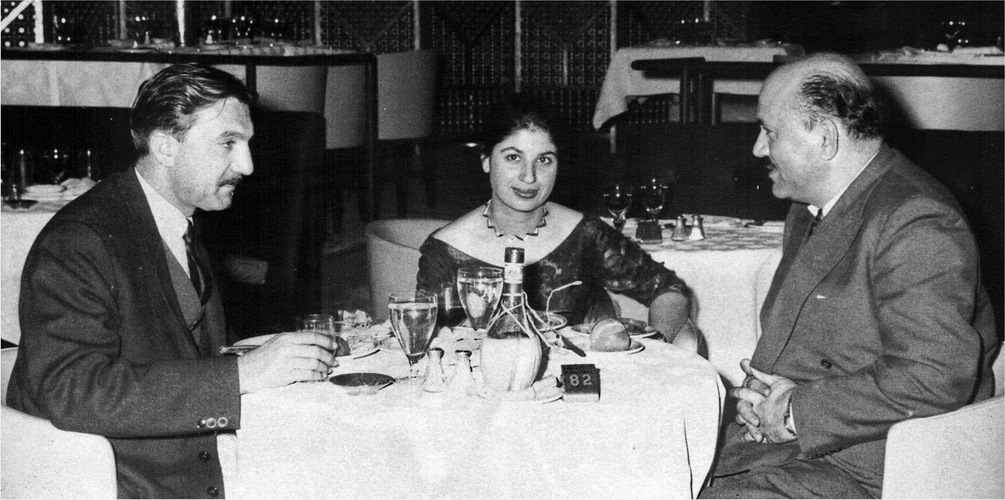
Rifat Chadirji (left) with Balqees Sharara and Mohamed Makiya, 1960s

Chadirji's early works were primarily reconstructions of old buildings and residential homes. The first house design of Chadirji's was for Baher Faik, a former statesman and ambassador of Iraq during the 1950s. In 1959, he was commissioned to construct The Monument to the Unknown Soldier in Baghdad's Firdos Square to commemorate the wars of independence fought against the British imposed monarchy. Described as a simple, symbolic and modernist structure, the statue evoked the parabolic arch of the ancient Arch of Ctesiphon built by the Sasanian Empire. Sketches of the design concept found at the Institute of Fine Arts in Baghdad, reveal the inspiration for the design to represent a mother bending over to pick up her martyred child. The monument by destroyed by Saddam Hussein's Ba'athist government in 1983 and replaced with a statue of Hussein himself.

Chadirji would continue to use ancient Iraqi motifs in his building designs. His works, such as the Hussain Jamil Residence (1953), Tobacco Warehouse (1965), the Rafiq Residence (1965) and the Central Post Office (1975), are informed by Iraqi practices of temperature control – natural ventilation, courtyards, screen walls and reflected light. He also employed the architectural language of arches and monolithic piers that remind visitors of ancient Iraqi architectural history. Although, his designs often used vernacular elements, he often abstracted them and incorporated them in new forms. At times, he relied on traditional exteriors, but designed European interiors.

In 1978, Chadirji was jailed in Abu Ghraib prison after refusing President Ahmed Hassan al-Bakr permission to use his design studio Iraq Consult's Bahrain office for intelligence gathering. While imprisoned, he wrote a book on architecture, Al Ukhaidir and the Crystal Palace, using materials that his wife had smuggled into Abu Ghraib. The book has been described as a "seminal work" on the subject of Iraq's architecture.

After serving twenty months, Chadirji was released by Saddam Hussein, who had deposed al-Bakr, and wanted him to lead the work on Baghdad's beautification plan for the Non-Aligned Movement conference scheduled for September 1982. Chadirji was offered the choice to accept the commission or stay in prison. He became Hussein's architectural consultant for Baghdad City Planning for the period 1982–1983.

In the 1980s, Chadirji became Councillor to the Mayor, a role that found him overseeing all the reconstruction projects in Baghdad. He left Iraq in 1983 to take up an academic position at Harvard University. Some years later, on his return to Baghdad, he was saddened by the deterioration in the city. He and his wife decided to leave Iraq permanently, and they settled in London, where he continued to live.

Along with his father, Chadirji photographically documented much of Baghdad and the larger region of Iraq and Syria. They feared the regional architecture and monuments would be lost to new development associated with the oil boom. In 1995, he published a book of his father's precious photographs. His father's position as a politician gave him access to many people and places that may have been difficult for other photographers.

In an interview with Ricardo Karam, Chadirji talked about his atheism; after studying philosophy with his wife, Balqees Sharara, he came to the understanding that religions originated from magic. He also said that he respected all religions, and asked after his death that prayers not be offered for him, and that his body be cremated.

== Work ==
Although Chadirji designed many residences, he is most noted for his public works, including buildings and monuments. His Monument to the Unknown Soldier (1959), described as a simple, symbolic, modernist structure, was removed from al-Fardous Square to make way for a statue of Saddam Hussein in the early 1980s. The replacement statue was infamously toppled on 9 April 2003 in full view of the world, as global media filmed and photographed the destruction.

Site	Location	Country
The Monument to the Unknown Soldier (erected 1959: replaced 1983)	Baghdad	Iraq
Iraqi Scientific Academy Building (1965)	Baghdad	Iraq
Tobacco Monopoly Company building (Offices and Tobacco Warehouses) (1966)	Baghdad	Iraq
Rafiq Residence (1965)	Baghdad	Iraq
School for Veterinary Medicine (1967)	Baghdad	Iraq
Hamood Villa (1972)	Baghdad	Iraq
Central Post Office (1975)	Baghdad	Iraq
National Insurance Company	Mosul	Iraq
Central Post Telegraph and Telephone Administration (Al-Sinak Telephone Exchange) (1975)	Baghdad	Iraq

=== Associated publications ===
Chadirji's publications are primarily in Arabic and include:

- al-Ukhaidir and the Crystal Palace (1991)
- A Dialogue on the Structure of Art and Architecture (1995).
- Regenerative approaches to mosque design-competition to State Mosque, Baghdad. In Mimar 1984,11 page 44-63 ISSN 0129-8372.
- Concepts & Influences: Towards a Regionalized International Architecture, 1987.ISBN no. 0-7103-0180-4.
- Internationalised Tradition in Architecture, 1988. ISBN no. 1-85035-146-5.

Author	Title	Year
Chadirji, Rifat	Introduction to Urban Design and Architecture in Lebanon	2004
Chadirji, Rifat	Medina Interviews Architect	1999
Chadirji, Rifat	The Photographs of Kamil Chadirji	1995
Khan, Hasan-Uddin	Regional Modernism: Rifat Chadirji's Portfolio of Etchings	1984
Chadirji, Rifat	Concepts and Influences:Towards a Regional International Architecture, 1952–1978	1986

== Awards ==
- 1964: Bronze Medal, Barcelona Furniture Design
- 1986: Chairman's Award of the Aga Khan Award for Architecture
- 2008: Sheikh Zayed' Book Award, 2008
- 2015: Honorary PhD from Coventry University
- 2015: Lifetime Achievement Award from Tamayouz Excellence Award

== Legacy ==
In 2017, the Rifat Chadirji Prize was created to recognise local architects who are involved in rebuilding parts of Iraq that had been destroyed. The prize is awarded under the umbrella of the Tamayouz Award for Excellence.

== Personal life ==
In 1954, he married Balkis Shahara. He retired from practice in 1982 and thereafter devoted his time to research and writing.

Chadirji died from COVID-19 in London on 10 April 2020, at the age of 93. The Iraqi prime minister designate Mustafa Al-Kadhimi and the Iraqi president Barham Salih both paid their tributes.

== See also ==
- Culture of Iraq
- Iraqi art
- Islamic art
- Islamic architecture
- List of Iraqi artists
- Tomb of the Unknown Soldier
