= George Haddad =

George Haddad may refer to:

- George Wayne Haddad (1912–?), political figure in British Columbia
- George Ibrahim Haddad, Jordanian writer, poet and journalist
