= Barjas (name) =

Barjas is an Arabic surname and a masculine given name. In the latter usage it was mentioned in the 1852 book entitled A Dictionary, Persian, Arabic, and English by Francis Johnson. Notable people with the name are as follows:

== Surname ==
- Abd al-Karim Barjas (died 2022), Iraqi politician
- Jalal Barjas (born 1970), Jordanian journalist

== Given name ==
- Barjas al-Hadid (born 1936), Jordanian politician

== See also ==
- Barjas (disambiguation)
