= Hadid (disambiguation) =

Hadid is a moshav in central Israel.

Hadid, Hadeed or Al-Hadid may refer to:

- Hadid, Iran, a village in Khuzestan Province, Iran
- Gulshan-e-Hadeed, is a neighborhood of Karachi, Pakistan, meaning Garden of Iron.
- Al-Hadid, the 57th sura of the Qur'an
- Hadid (name)
- Hadeed Plateau, Somalia
- HADID, a UAE-based global aviation services company

== See also ==
- Hadidi (disambiguation)
- Haditha (disambiguation)
