= Ahali group =

Ahali Group الأهالي
- Leader: Ja'far Abu al-Timman
- Founded: 1930-1958
- Split from: National Democratic Party National Union Party
- Headquarters: Baghdad
- Newspaper: al-Ahali, then Sawt al-Ahali
- Ideology: Populism; Iraqism; Socialism; Nonsectarianism
- Political position: Left-wing

The al-Ahali Group (Arabic: مجموعة الاهالي) was a political association formed in 1930 by a collection of non-sectarian, middle class Iraqi youth frustrated with the Iraqi monarchy. Although it was not an official party, it was a successor to the Watani (National) party and home to several important Iraqi Cabinet and Parliament members, including Ja'far Abu al-Timman, Hikmat Sulayman, Kamil Chadirji, and Mohammed Hadid. Perhaps more importantly, its history illustrated the often complex task of navigating reform in the ideological and socio-political climate that predominated under the monarchy. It transformed from a radical left youth organization, to a more moderate reformist group under the aforementioned senior politicians, to an unfortunate accomplice in the Bakr Sidqi coup, and finally dissolved in protest over said coup's brutality and disregard for reform.

== Formation and Ideas ==
The Ahali group was formed in the 1930s during a period of expanded education and, consequentially, the proliferation of youth and student political clubs. It was formed by 'Abd al-Fattah Ibrahim and Mohammed Hadid, both law students whom had studied abroad and adopted socialism, and though the latter came from a wealthy Mosulite family most of its ranks were from an expanding middle class of youth with no hope of participating in formal politics. Thus, although the group spoke much about political and economic reform, it initially saw this as springing from a new, more ethical and intellectual mass culture. It saw itself as a "school for the people," and focused on bringing about an expansion of civil society through pushes for enhanced democratic rights and something akin to British Fabian socialism—all based in non-sectarian cooperation.

Socialism and related ideologies had a negative stigma attached to them, so al-Ahali adopted the term Sha'biya (Populism) for their at times vague intellectual orientation. In general, it emphasized equal rights regardless of social status (and democratic representational governance), welfare reform on a sort of collectivist model, and their growth from traditional institutions like family, religion, and patriotism. It condemned nationalism as imperialist.

Because it could not participate directly in politics, the group initially turned its energies elsewhere—to newspapers and informal associations. Al-Ahali quickly grew to be one of the most respected papers in Iraq. despite its ostensible goal of educating Iraqis and home-growing a civil society, the Ahali group was hindered by its intellectualist bent focus more on Western than indigenous culture. Its first paper detailed the history of Western political thought from the Greeks to Russian revolution. Members enjoyed equally astounding success organizationally. In September 1933 they formed the Association for Combatting Illiteracy and thereby converted individuals not only in Baghdad to their cause, but members from Basra, Nasiriyya, Kufa, Ba'qubah, and Hillah—that is, more "provincial" locales that were notoriously hard to access. This, they accomplished with the aid and aegis of Ja'far Abu al-Timman's assistance and blessing.

== Political Turn ==
When Ahali's Baghdad Club was disbanded by the authorities, members became increasingly convicted that they could not continue as vulnerably as before. By dropping the term "Sha'biya" they were able to draw in politicians such as Kamil al-Chadirji whom had departed the Party of National Brotherhood either because they were too progressive, or because of disputes with the Yasin-Rashid regime, such as Hikmat Sulayman's. Given Ja'far Abu al-Timman's leadership it also signified something of a successor to his dissolved Watani Party. These senior politicians formed an executive committee in March 1935, but elected to keep contacts with nonpolitical societies such as the Society to Combat Illiteracy, older politicians, and army officials through secret meetings rather than to form a political party. Inevitably, this broadening of Ahali's horizons entailed moderation of its ideology, which became, rather hazily, "reform" broadly construed. However, Communist and Sha'biya advocates remained active in the group.

== Opposition to the Yasin-Rashid administration ==
The group grew yet more entangled in politics with the ascent of the Party of National Brotherhood and the Yasin-Rashid administration. Yasin al-Hashimi and Ali al-Rashid had established the harshest restrictions on freedom of the press and political activity of any prior cabinet under the monarchy, and Hashimi had intimated that he sought to stay in power beyond his tenure (albeit not explicitly). In April 1936 the Ahali group published one issue of a paper titled al-Bayan accusing the administration of neglecting promises for reform, and instead selling control of the Iraqi economy to the British with a railway agreement. The paper was suppressed after the first issue. The Ahali group thus issued subsequent petitions to King Ghazi through the Syrian paper al-Qabas and the Lebanese paper al-Masa. It was this that caused the group to join with the Bakr Sidqi coup and provide him much needed legitimacy through their popular appeal. This was not a premeditated move. Rather, Hikmat Sulayman had developed a close relationship with Sidqi owing to their mutual admiration of Mustafa Kemal's reforms in Turkey, and foisted the connection upon the rest of the al-Ahali group. He acted as the sole liaison to Sidqi and the officers. The rest of the group hardly knew the general's face.

As such, though the Ahali group obtained half the portfolios in government and were able to form the Association of People's Reform in 1936, they never had any power under the subsequent government. The group left government in June 1937. Shortly thereafter Bakr Sidqi suppressed their paper and the Association of People's Reform. The group's leaders and followers were scattered.

== Post-coup ==
After the Rashid Ali coup, the reigning Cabinet recognized that it needed to give the opposition constitutional channels to operate in order to foster stability. The Ahali group's members thus re-constituted themselves in the form of al-Chaderchi's democratic socialists (the National Democratic Party) and the socialists led by 'Abd al-Fattah Ibrahim in the National Union Party.
