= Barjas (disambiguation) =

Barjas is a village and municipality in Spain. It may also refer to:

- Barjas (name), list of people with the name
- Bårjås, Sami language popular scientific journal in Norway
