= Abdel Amir Abbud Rahima =

Iraqi politician

Abdel Amir Abbud Rahima was Minister of Agriculture in the cabinet appointed by the Interim Iraq Governing Council in September 2003. A Shia Muslim, Rahima hails from the city of Basra and is a member of the National Democratic Party.

Preceded by Coalition Provisional Authority	Minister of Agriculture; September 2003 – June 2004	Succeeded by Sawsan Sherif
