= Hadith (disambiguation) =

Ḥadīth in Islam are the record of the words, actions, and the silent approval, of the Islamic prophet Muhammad

Hadith may also refer to:

- Hadith Sahih al Bukhari, a collection of hadith by al-Bukhari, the best known of the Sunni hadith collections
- Hadith studies, several religious disciplines used in the study and evaluation of the Islamic hadith
- A stylization of Hadit, deity of the Thelema, new religious movement
- Hadith Qudse, "holy" category of hadith

== See also ==
- Haditha (disambiguation)
- Hadith studies
- Hadith terminology
- Ahl al-Hadith, also known as traditionalists and traditionists, 2nd/ 3rd Islamic centuries as a movement of hadith scholars who considered the Quran and authentic hadith to be the only authority in matters of law and creed
- Ahl-i Hadith or Ahl-e-Hadith, a religious movement that emerged in Northern India in the mid-nineteenth century
