= Hadad (disambiguation) =

Hadad was the storm and rain god in the Northwest Semitic and ancient Mesopotamian religions.

Hadad or Haddad may also refer to:

- Haddad or Hadad, an ancient Middle Eastern family name originating in Aramaic
- Hadad (Bible), the name of several biblical characters
  - Hadad (son of Bedad), an early king of Edom
  - Hadad the Edomite
- Hodod (Hungarian: Hadad), a commune in Romania

== See also ==
- Hadadezer
- Ben-hadad (disambiguation)
