= Tes Cheveux Noirs Ihsan =

2005 Moroccan film

- Directed by: Tala Hadid
- Written by: Tala Hadid
- Produced by: Tala Hadid; Paula Hardy
- Starring: Naima Bouzid; Hmed Khribesh; Okba Rian
- Cinematography: Nils Kenaston
- Release date: 12 June 2005 (Student Academy Awards)
- Country: Mexico / United States / Morocco
- Language: Arabic / English

Tes Cheveux Noirs Ihsan is a 2005 short 35mm film made in Northern Morocco with non-professional actors. The winner of an award from the Academy of Motion Picture Arts and Sciences as well as the Panorama Best short film Award at the Berlin Film Festival 2006.

== Premise ==
A man returns to his home in Northern Africa, and remembers his childhood and the mother he lost as a child.
