= Tala Hadid =

American film director

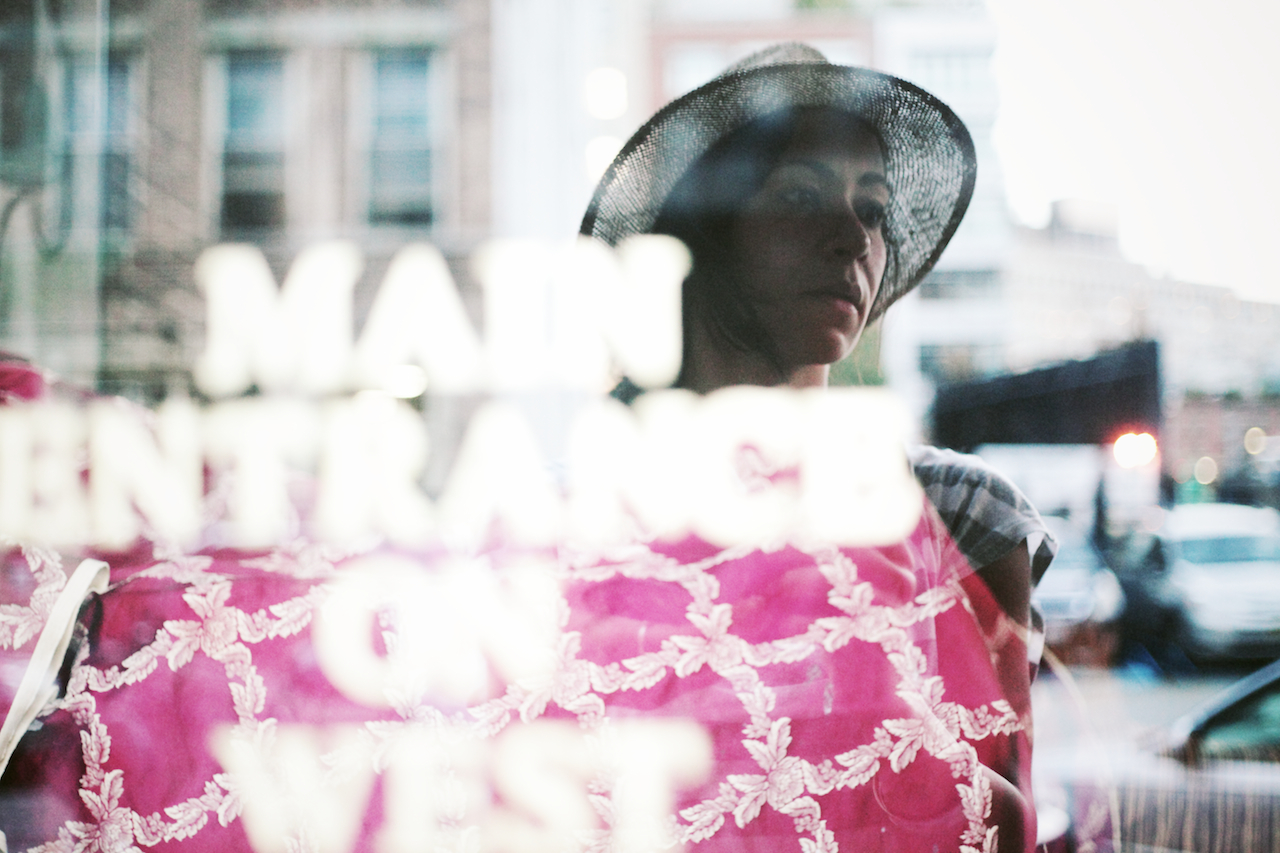
- Born: London, England
- Occupations: Film director and producer; Photographer
- Notable work: Sacred Poet; Windsleepers; Itarr el Layl; House in the Fields

Tala Hadid (born in London) is a film director and producer. She is also a photographer. Her work has been shown at the Museum of Modern Art in New York City, The Walker Arts Center in Minneapolis, The Smithsonian National Museum, The National Museum of Women in the Arts in Washington D.C., L'Institut du Monde Arabe in Paris and other locations.

== Early life ==
Hadid was born to a Moroccan mother, Kenza Alaoui while her father was Foulath Hadid, an Iraqi writer, and expert on Middle East affairs. Her paternal grandfather, the Marxist economist Mohammed Hadid was imprisoned under Saddam Hussein. Her aunt was the noted architect Zaha Hadid.

Hadid co-produced and directed her first full-length film while she was studying as an undergraduate at Brown University. The film, Sacred Poet, focuses the lens on the Italian poet and filmmaker Pier Paolo Pasolini with rare interviews with Laura Betti, Bernardo Bertolucci, Sergio Citti and Ninetto Davoli.

The author of several short films, in 2000 while she was working on a project on the Macedonian Roma community in Naples, Italy, she was awarded a fellowship to study film at the graduate film department at Columbia University in New York City.

== Career ==
In 2001 she directed Windsleepers, a film set in St Petersburg, Russia, with poets Genya Turovskaya and Vladimir Kucheriavkin.

In 2005 Hadid completed her thesis film, Tes Cheveux Noirs Ihsan. The film, shot in Northern Morocco and in the Rif Mountains, was awarded the 2005 Cinecolor/Kodak Prize and in June 2005 received a Student Academy Award. It has screened at numerous Film Festivals including the New York Film Festival at the Lincoln Center, the Sundance Film Festival, the Rotterdam Film Festival (where it was nominated for a Tiger Award), the Fajr Film Festival in Tehran, the Kyiv International Film Festival, the Sydney Film Festival, the International Film Festival Oberhausen and L'Institut du Monde Arabe in Paris. The film went on to win numerous awards including the Global Lens Prize, A BAFTA special mention and a Special Jury Prize and best Actress Award at the Tangiers International Film Festival. In February 2006 the film won the Panorama Best short Film Award at the Berlin Film Festival.

Hadid's work has been shown at the Museum of Modern Art (MOMA) in New York City, the Walker Art Center in Minneapolis, the Smithsonian National Museum, the National Museum of Women in the Arts in Washington D.C, L'Institut du Monde Arabe in Paris, the Goteberg Kunsthalle in Sweden, the Goethe Institute, Cairo, the Seville Biennale in Spain, the Jonathon Schorr Gallery NYC, the Los Angeles County Museum (LACMA), the Cinémathèque Française in Paris, the Slought Foundation in Philadelphia as well as the Photographer's Gallery in London and the Cinémathèque de Tanger.

In 2010/2011 Hadid worked on an independent project entitled Heterotopia, a series of photographs documenting life in a New York City brothel. In 2012 she was awarded the Peter S Reed Foundation Arts grant in support of her documentary film work in Morocco. In the autumn of 2013 a small volume of a selection of her photographs was published by Stern Fotografie Portfolio series of emerging photographers.

In 2014 Hadid completed work on Itarr el Layl (The Narrow Frame of Midnight), a feature film about a man in search of his missing brother. The main character Zacharia, played by Khalid Abdalla, journeys through Morocco to Turkey and eventually to Iraq during the second Iraq War. The film premiered at the Toronto film Festival and went on to screen at various film festivals and venues, including the Elinor Bunin Munroe Film Center at the Lincoln Center in New York, the Rome Film Festival, London Film Festival and the Walker Arts Center among other places. In early 2015 the film won best film and critics prize at the Tangier National film festival, Jury Prize at Pleins les Yeux in the Netherlands, Credit Agricole Prize in Nice, France and the audience award for Best Narrative feature at the Mizna Film Festival in Minneapolis. In September 2015, Hadid's project House in the Fields was selected to screen as a work-in-progress at the 72nd Venice Biennale International Film Festival where it was awarded two prizes. In February 2017, the film premiered at the Berlin Film Festival where it was nominated for the Glashütte Original Documentary Award. The film was also the recipient of the Commune di Milano Prize for Best Feature Film at the FCAAL Milano Film Festival 2017, the Firebird Award for best Documentary at the Hong Kong International Film Festival 2017, the Fiction/Non Fiction Best Film Award at the Millennium Docs against Gravity International Film Festival in Warsaw 2017, the 2M Grand Prize at FIDADOC 2017, the 2017 John Marshall Award in the US, the Special Jury Prize at the 2018 National Film Festival in Tangiers, and the Grand Prize of the city at the 2018 International Mediterranean Film Festival of Tetouan. In 2019 Hadid photographed and produced the installation project Floodplain based on Tablet XI of Gilgamesh for the 2019 Rabat Biennale. In 2025 Hadid was a visiting faculty member at the department of Art, Film and Visual Studies at the Faculty of Arts and Sciences at Harvard University. Hadid’s work is part of the Ruben Bentsov Moving Image Collection at the Walker Museum in the US. She is a member of the Academy of Motion Picture Arts and Sciences.

== General references ==
- Senses of Cinema interview 2017
- BKB Weekly profile 2017
- Berlin Film Journal review 2017
- Glashutte Award nomination 2017
- Walker Art Center: the Year according to Tala Hadid
- La ragazzina che vuole essere avvocato tra i monti dell’Atlante
- La Repubblica profile 2017
- Mumbai Film Festival 2016 Jury profile
- E-taqafa.ma
- Reorientmag.com
- Whatson.bfi.org.uk
- Blogs.indiewire.com
- Filmdooworld.com
- Ft.com
- Frameworknow.com
- Telegraph 21 interview
