= Haditha (disambiguation) =

Haditha is a city in Iraq.

Haditha or al-Haditha may also refer to:

== Geography ==
=== Iraq ===
- Haditha District, a district in Anbar Province, Iraq
- Haditha Dam, a Dam on the Euphrates in central Iraq
- Hdatta, also known as Haditha, a medieval city in Upper Mesopotamia

=== Lebanon ===
- Haddatha, a village in Southern Lebanon

=== Palestine ===
- Hadatha, the former Palestinian village in Tiberias Sub-district
- Al-Haditha, Ramle, the former Palestinian village in Ramle Sub-district

=== Saudi Arabia ===
- Al-Haditha, Saudi Arabia, a village in Saudi Arabia

== Others ==
- Battle of Haditha, a battle fought between U.S. forces and Iraqi insurgents in early August 2005
- Haditha massacre or Haditha killings, an incident in which 24 Iraqis were killed by United States Marines on 19 November 2005
- Battle for Haditha, a 2007 film based on the Haditha killings

== See also ==
- Hadid (disambiguation)
- Hadidi (disambiguation)
- Hadith (disambiguation)
