= Chair (officer) =

Leading or presiding officer of an organized group

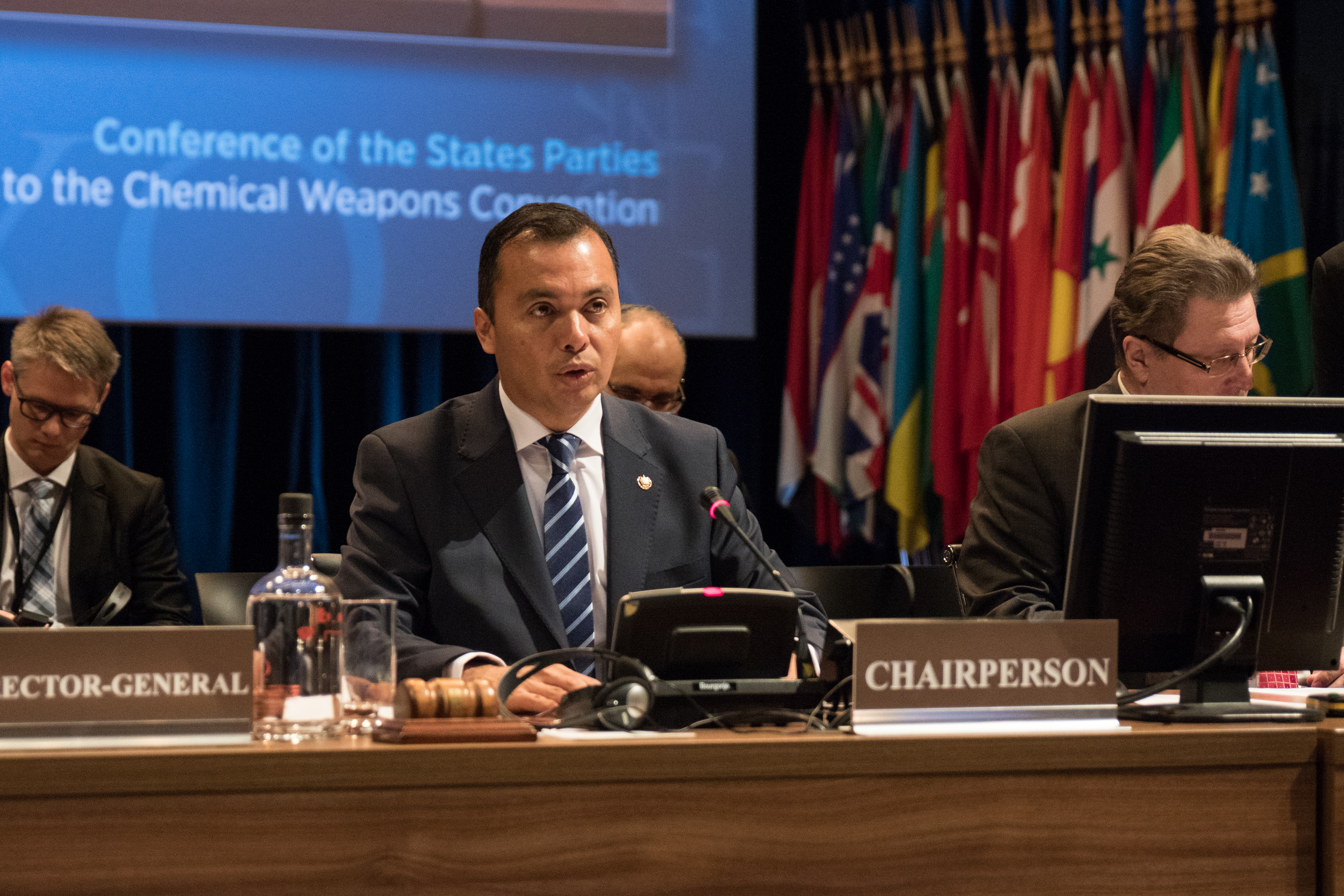
Agustín Vásquez Gómez, representative of the Republic of El Salvador, chairing the OPCW's Fourth Review Conference, November 2018

The chair, also chairman, chairwoman, or chairperson, is the presiding officer of an organized group such as a board, committee, or deliberative assembly. The person holding the office, who is typically elected or appointed by members of the group or organisation, presides over meetings of the group, and is required to conduct the group's business in an orderly fashion.

In some organizations, the chair is also known as president (or other title). In others, where a board appoints a president (or other title), the two terms are used for distinct positions. The term chairman may be used in a neutral manner, not directly implying the gender of the holder. In meetings or conferences, to "chair" something (chairing) means to lead the event.

== Terminology ==
Terms for the office and its holder include chair, chairman, chairwoman, chairperson, convenor, facilitator, moderator, president, and presiding officer. The chair of a parliamentary chamber is sometimes called the speaker. Chair has been used to refer to a seat or office of authority since the middle of the 17th century; its earliest citation in the Oxford English Dictionary dates to 1658–1659, four years after the first citation for chairman. Feminist critiques have analysed Chairman as a possible example of sexist language, associating the male gender with the exercise of authority; this has led to some use of the generic "Chairperson".

In World Schools Style debating, as of 2009, chair or chairman refers to the person who controls the debate; it recommends using Madame Chair or Mr. Chairman to address the chair. The FranklinCovey Style Guide for Business and Technical Communication and the American Psychological Association style guide advocate using chair or chairperson. The Oxford Dictionary of American Usage and Style (2000) suggested that the gender-neutral forms were gaining ground; it advocated chair for both men and women. The Daily Telegraph's style guide bans the use of chair and chairperson; the newspaper's position, as of 2018, is that "chairman is correct English". The National Association of Parliamentarians adopted a resolution in 1975 discouraging the use of chairperson and rescinded it in 2017.

=== Usage ===
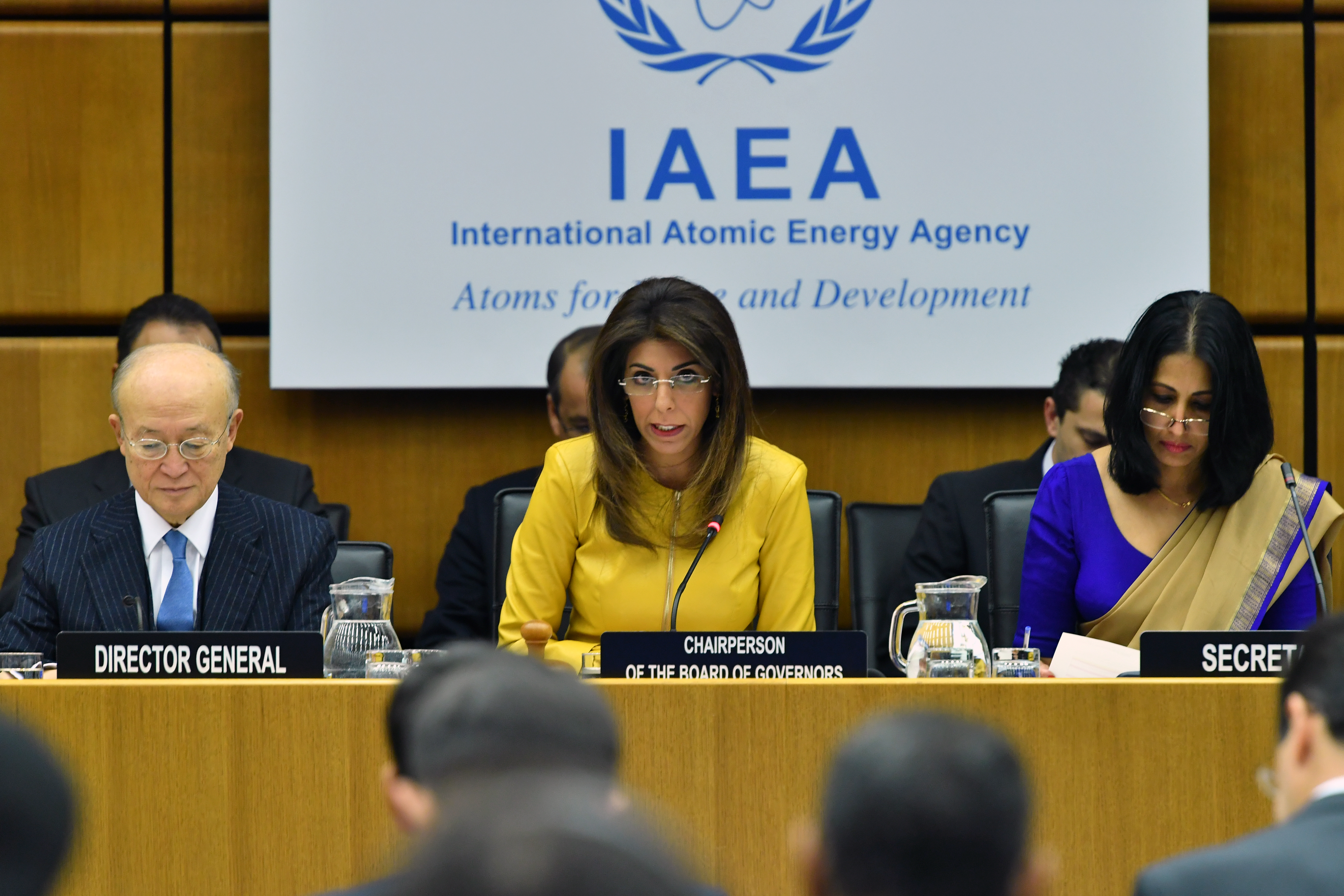
Ambassador Leena Al-Hadid of Jordan chairs a meeting of the International Atomic Energy Agency, 2018.

The word chair can refer to the place from which the holder of the office presides, whether on a chair, at a lectern, or elsewhere. During meetings, the person presiding is said to be "in the chair" and is also referred to as "the chair". Parliamentary procedure requires that members address the "chair" as "Mr. (or Madam) Chairman (or Chair or Chairperson)" rather than using a name – one of many customs intended to maintain the presiding officer's impartiality and to ensure an objective and impersonal approach.

In the British music hall tradition, the chairman was the master of ceremonies who announced the performances and was responsible for controlling any rowdy elements in the audience. The role was popularised on British TV in the 1960s and 1970s by Leonard Sachs, the chairman on the variety show The Good Old Days.

"Chairman" as a quasi-title gained particular resonance when socialist states from 1917 onwards shunned more traditional leadership labels and stressed the collective control of Soviets (councils or committees) by beginning to refer to executive figureheads as "Chairman of the X Committee". Vladimir Lenin, for example, officially functioned as the head of Soviet Russian government not as prime minister or as president, but as "Chairman of the Council of People's Commissars". At the same time, the head of the state was first called "Chairman of the Central Executive Committee" (until 1938) and then "Chairman of the Presidium of the Presidium of the Supreme Soviet". In China, Mao Zedong was commonly called "Chairman Mao", as he was officially Chairman of the Chinese Communist Party and Chairman of the Central Military Commission.

== Roles and responsibilities ==
=== Duties at meetings ===
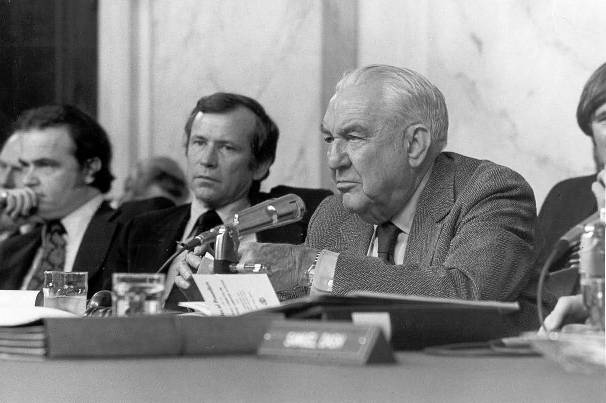
Sam Ervin (right), chairman of the United States Senate Watergate Committee, 1973

In addition to the administrative or executive duties in organizations, the chair presides over meetings. Such duties at meetings include:

- Calling the meeting to order
- Determining if a quorum is present
- Announcing the items on the "order of business", or agenda, as they come up
- Recognition of members to have the floor
- Enforcing the rules of the group
- Putting questions (motions) to a vote, which is the usual way of resolving disagreements following discussion of the issues
- Adjourning the meeting

While presiding, the chair should remain impartial and not interrupt a speaker if the speaker has the floor and is following the rules of the group. In committees or small boards, the chair votes along with the other members; in assemblies or larger boards, the chair should vote only when it can affect the result. At a meeting, the chair only has one vote (i.e. the chair cannot vote twice and cannot override the decision of the group unless the organization has specifically given the chair such authority).

=== Powers and authority ===
The powers of the chair vary widely across organizations. In some organizations they have the authority to hire staff and make financial decisions. In others they only make recommendations to a board of directors, or may have no executive powers, in which case they are mainly a spokesperson for the organization. The power given depends upon the type of organization, its structure, and the rules it has created for itself.

=== Disciplinary procedures ===
If the chair exceeds their authority, engages in misconduct, or fails to perform their duties, they may face disciplinary procedures. Such procedures may include censure, suspension, or removal from office. The rules of the organization would provide details on who can perform these disciplinary procedures. Usually, whoever appointed or elected the chair has the power to discipline them.

== Public corporations ==
There are three common types of chair in public corporations.

=== Chairman and CEO ===
The chief executive officer (CEO) may also hold the title of chair, in which case the board frequently names an independent member of the board as a lead independent director. This position is equivalent to the position of président-directeur général in France.

=== Executive chair ===
Executive chair is an office separate from that of CEO, where the titleholder wields influence over company operations, such as Tim Cook of Apple Inc., Larry Ellison of Oracle, Douglas Flint of HSBC, Steve Case of AOL Time Warner, Jeff Bezos of Amazon, Ignacio Sánchez Galán of Iberdrola and Ana Botín of Banco Santander. In particular, the group chair of HSBC is considered the top position of that institution, outranking the chief executive, and is responsible for leading the board and representing the company in meetings with government figures. Before the creation of the group management board in 2006, HSBC's chair essentially held the duties of a chief executive at an equivalent institution, while HSBC's chief executive served as the deputy. After the 2006 reorganization, the management cadre ran the business, while the chair oversaw the controls of the business through compliance and audit and the direction of the business.

=== Non-executive chair ===
Non-executive chair is also a separate post from the CEO; unlike an executive chair, a non-executive chair does not interfere in day-to-day company matters. Across the world, many companies have separated the roles of chair and CEO, saying that this move improves corporate governance. The non-executive chair's duties are typically limited to matters directly related to the board, such as:

- Chairing the meetings of the board.
- Organizing and coordinating the board's activities, such as by setting its annual agenda.
- Reviewing and evaluating the performance of the CEO and the other board members.

=== Examples ===
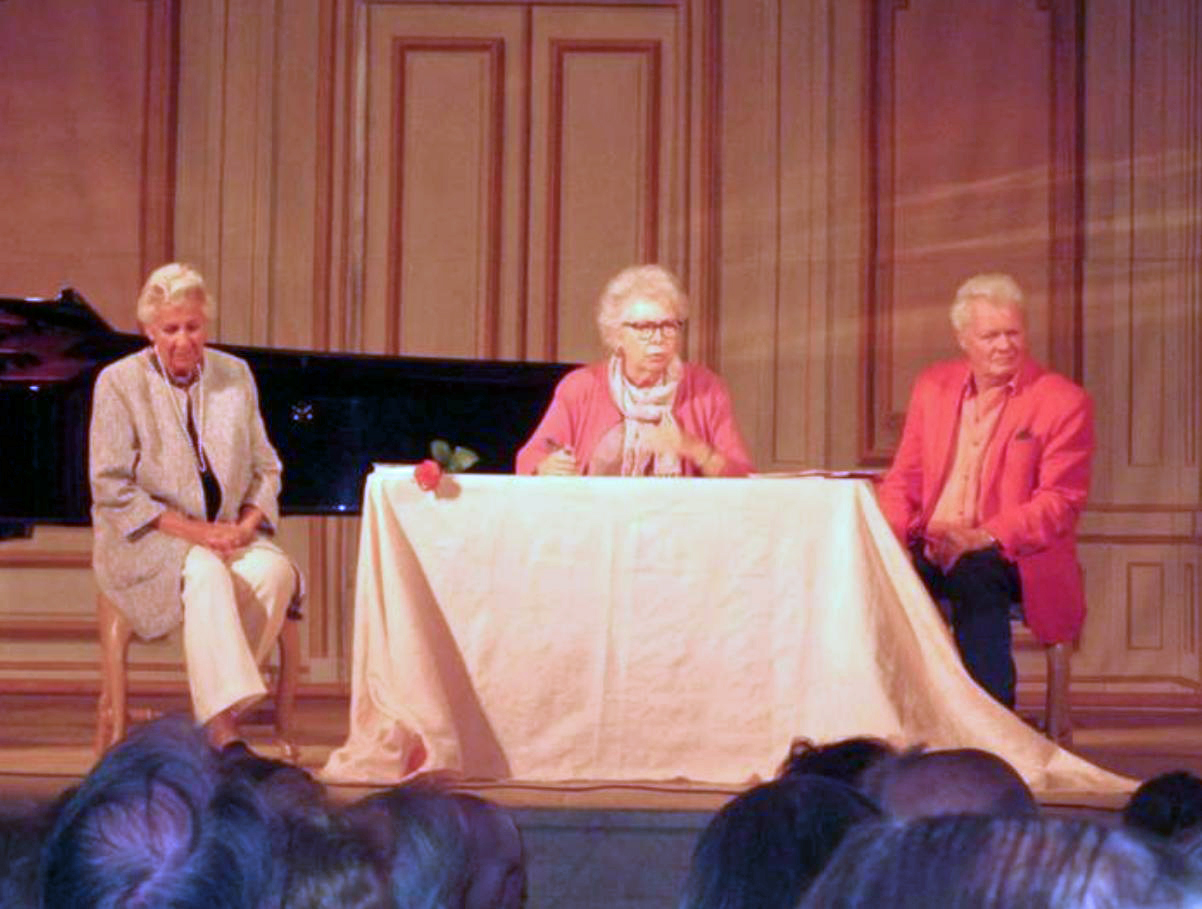
Christina Magnuson, as chairman, presides over the 2016 annual meeting of the Friends of the Ulriksdal Palace Theater.

Many companies in the US have an executive chair; this method of organization is sometimes called the American model. Having a non-executive chair is common in the UK and Canada; this is sometimes called the British model. Expert opinion is rather evenly divided over which is the preferable model. There is a growing push by public market investors for companies with an executive chair to have a lead independent director to provide some element of an independent perspective.

The role of the chair in a private equity-backed board differs from the role in non-profit or publicly listed organizations in several ways, including the pay, role and what makes an effective private-equity chair. Companies with both an executive chair and a CEO include Ford, HSBC, Alphabet Inc., and HP.

== Vice-chair and deputy chair ==
A vice- or deputy chair, subordinate to the chair, is sometimes chosen to assist and to serve as chair in the latter's absence, or when a motion involving the chair is being discussed. In the absence of the chair and vice-chair, groups sometimes elect a chair pro tempore to fill the role for a single meeting. In some organizations that have both titles, deputy chair ranks higher than vice-chair, as there are often multiple vice-chairs but only a single deputy chair. This type of deputy chair title on its own usually has only an advisory role and not an operational one (such as Ted Turner at Time Warner).

An unrelated definition of vice- and deputy chairs describes an executive who is higher ranking or has more seniority than an executive vice-president (EVP).

== See also ==
- Executive director
- Non-executive director
- Parliamentary procedure in the corporate world
- President (corporate title)
