= Mohammed Hadid =

Iraqi activist and politician

His Excellency Mohammed Hadid

Minister of Finance of Iraq
- In office July 1958 – March 1960
- President: Muhammad Najib ar-Ruba'i
- Prime Minister: Abd al-Karim Qasim
- Preceded by: Nadim al-Pachachi
- Succeeded by: Hashem Jawad

Personal details
- Born: 1 January 1907 Mosul, Ottoman Iraq
- Died: 3 August 1999 (aged 92) London, England
- Spouse: Wajeeha Sabonji
- Children: Zaha Hadid; Foulath Hadid; Haithem Hadid

Mohammed Hadid (1 January 1907 – 3 August 1999) was an Iraqi economist, democracy advocate, Minister of Finance of Iraq between 1958 and 1960 and the father of internationally recognized architect Zaha Hadid.

== Early years and family ==
Mohammed Hadid was born into a rich Mosulite family at the beginning of the 20th century. He married Wajeeha Sabonji, with whom he had three children; Haithem, the writer and businessman, Foulath, and the noted architect Zaha Hadid.

== Years of study ==
Hadid attended the London School of Economics between 1928 and 1931, and achieved a degree in economics. It was there that he is said to have been influenced by the ideas of Professor Harold Laski, a "widely known socialist and agnostic". He was also influenced by the works of Sidney Webb, Hugh Dalton, John Maynard Keynes and other economists and socialists whose Fabian ideas held the promise for a new social order to be constructed in the aftermath of the Ottoman Empire.

== Politics ==
In 1931, Hadid returned to Baghdad and joined the Iraqi Ministry of Finance. More importantly, he became a founding member of the politically progressive Ahali group which embraced the ideals of Britain's Labour Party and attracted other leading personalities such as Abd al-Fattah Ibrahim, Jafar Abu-Timman, Kamil Chadirji and Hikmat Sulayman.

== Ahali group ==
In 1936, the Ahali group was involved in a coup d'état that was led by army general Bakr Sidqi. When Sidqi sought dictatorial power at the expense of the group's plans for public welfare and reform, the group resigned en bloc in 1937. In 1946, Hadid became Vice-President of the National Democratic Party. The party, essentially the social democratic wing of the Ahali group, championed agrarian reform, workers' rights and state control of Iraq's nascent oil industry.

== International voice ==
While representing Mosul in the Chamber of Deputies, Hadid became a leading member of the Council of the Federation of Iraqi Industries. British influence was still immense in Iraq. During visits to the United Kingdom he supplied the press with calls for genuine parliamentary Iraqi democracy. He also opposed Iraqi participation in the pro-Western defence organisation known as the Baghdad Pact. In 1956, when Britain joined France and Israel in attacking Suez, he spearheaded the Front of National Union through which Iraq's political parties united in demanding "the combating of imperialist encroachments".

== Another coup ==
Following a 1958 coup, Hadid became Minister of Finance in the government formed by the leading rebel, Brigadier Abd al-Karim Qasim, who became Prime Minister and Minister of Defence. As Minister of Finance, Hadid used credit loans from the Soviet Union and Eastern Europe to foster industry and pay for ambitious schemes to alleviate the suffering of the Iraqi masses. He served in that capacity until March 1960. In 1963, another coup put the Ba'ath Party briefly into power, and Hadid was put on trial, interned and deprived of his assets.

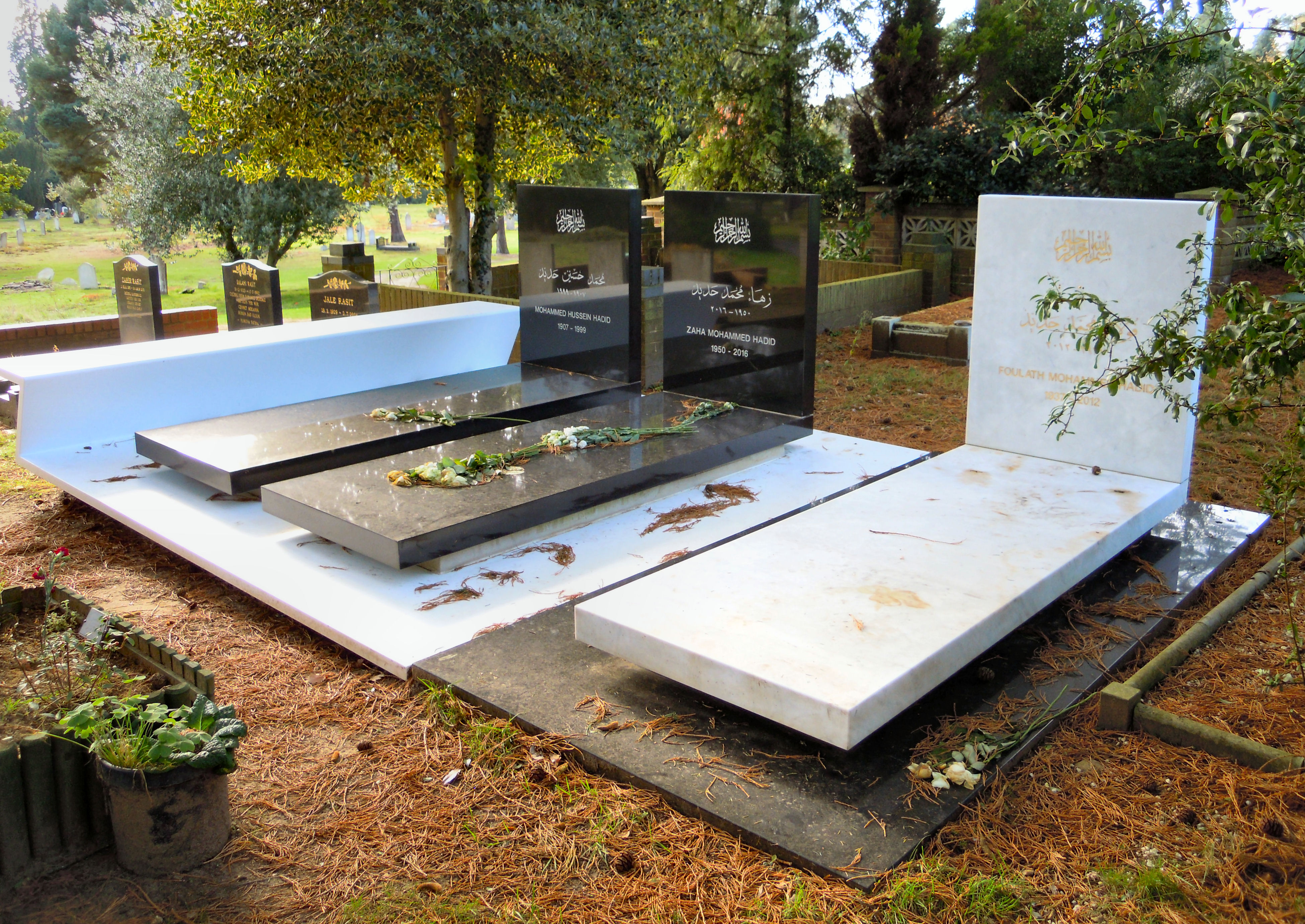
The graves of Mohammed Hadid (left), Zaha Hadid (centre) and Foulath Hadid (right) in Brookwood Cemetery

== Later years ==
After the third coup, he focused on business rather than politics. In 1995, he relocated to London, where he died on August 3, 1999, at the age of 92.
