= National Democratic Party (Iraq) =

National Democratic Party الحزب الوطني الديمقراطي
- Leader: Abid Faisal Ihmaid
- Founded: 2003
- Preceded by: National Democratic Party
- Ideology: Social democracy Civic nationalism Nonsectarianism; Secularism
- Political position: Center-left
- National affiliation: Civil Democratic Alliance

The National Democratic Party (Arabic: الحزب الوطني الديمقراطي, Hizb al Wataniyah al Dimuqratiyah) is an Iraqi Secular political party. The party was founded after the 2003 invasion of Iraq, as several Iraqis, including Naseer al-Chaderchi, son of former leader Kamil al-Chaderchi, and Abdel Amir Abbud Rahima, sought to revive the historic National Democratic Party.

The party ran in the 2005 Iraqi election and received 36,795 votes, sufficient to win one seat. It lost parliamentary representation in the December 2005 elections, but a leading member, Hashim Abderrahman al-Shibli was nominated as Minister of Justice by the Iraqi National List.

In the 2009 governorate election in Basrah, the party is contesting on the list 'National Tendency', together with the Iraqi Communist Party, Popular Democratic Gathering and Independent Sons of Iraq.

Naseer al-Chaderchi is a former leader of the party The party's current leader is Abid Faisal Ihmaid, father of Member of the European Parliament Abir Al-Sahlani.
