= Foulath Hadid =

Iraqi writer, accountant and expert on Arab affairs

Foulath Hadid

Foulath Mohammed Hadid (7 March 1937–29 September 2012) was an Iraqi writer, and expert on Arab affairs.

== Biography ==
Born in Baghdad in 1937, the son of the Marxist Iraqi economist, cabinet minister and democracy advocate Mohammed Hadid and the brother of Haytham Hadid and the noted architect Zaha Hadid, his mother Wajiha al-Sabunji was an artist from Mosul. His father being a founding member of the Iraqi National Democratic Party, Foulath Hadid was strongly influenced by his father's political views as he grew up in a household where other leading members of the Party were regular visitors.

He attended Victoria College in Alexandria in Egypt from 1947 to 1956 before studying law at Christ's College, Cambridge. He went on to study Business at Harvard University and became a Fellow of the Institute of Chartered Accountants. He opened an office for the accountancy firm Arthur Young in Beirut and became a Partner in Peat, Marwick and Mitchell. He met his wife Lalla Kenza Alaoui while both were working in Washington, DC. Their daughter Tala Hadid is a painter and award-winning film-maker. The family divided their time between Europe, North America and the Middle East. A keen sportsman, Hadid played golf and was a regular visitor in the Royal Box at Wimbledon.

On his retirement Hadid was introduced to St Antony's College by his friend Patrick Seale and was elected to a Senior Associate Membership to enable him to edit and publish Mudhakkarati in 2006, the memoirs of his father Mohammed Hadid. The book was hailed as one of the most important Arab political memoirs of recent years. Years before the Arab Spring it was Hadid's belief that one day the Arab people would rise up and demand political freedom. "He condemned European imperialism, American hegemony, and autocratic Arab governments equally in denying the Arab people their legitimate aspirations." Having been accepted to read for a Doctor of Philosophy degree at Oxford he began working on his thesis, a history of Iraq's democracy movement in the 1940s and 1950s. However, instead he finished the work as his next book, Iraq's Democratic Moment, published posthumously in 2012. He received an advance copy at his hospital bed.

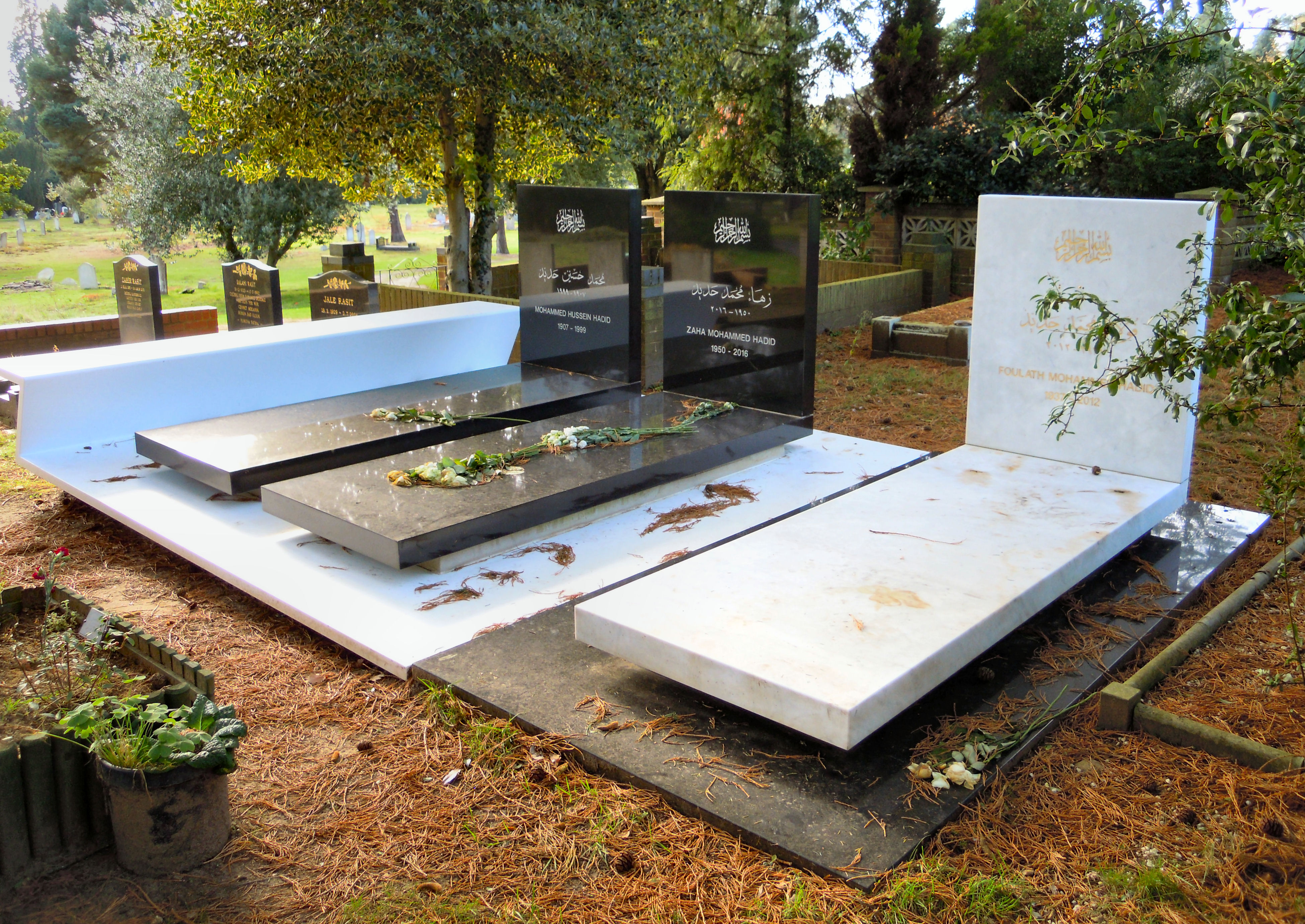
The graves of Mohammed Hadid (left), Zaha Hadid (centre) and Foulath Hadid (right) in Brookwood Cemetery

During the 12 years Hadid was involved at St Antony's, he raised funds to establish an annual award to support doctoral students in Middle Eastern studies, the Hadid Scholarship. At his suggestion, his sister Zaha Hadid designed a major new building for the Middle East Centre. In addition, he aided Warden Margaret MacMillan in securing the funding which allowed the College to begin a transforming building complex, which was completed in 2013. For his services to the College Hadid was elected to an Honorary Fellowship in 2004, and the Hadid Room, the College's meeting room, was named in his honour.

Foulath Hadid died in September 2012 after a short illness and was survived by his wife, his daughter Tala, his son Nik Williams, his elder brother Haytham Hadid and his sister Zaha Hadid, the latter having subsequently died in 2016. He is buried with his father and sister in Brookwood Cemetery.
