= Isaac Haddad =

- Died: 1755 Djerba, Beylik of Tunis, Ottoman Empire

Religious life
- Religion: Judaism

Isaac Ḥaddad (Hebrew: יצחק חדאד; died 1755) was a Talmudic scholar from Djerba. He was a pupil of Tzemaḥ ha-Kohen, and was the author of two works, Toledot Yitzḥak, novellæ on Haggadah and Midrashim (Livorno, 1761), and Ḳarne Re'em, novellæ on Rashi's and Mizraḥi's commentaries to the Pentateuch, followed by Zera Yitzḥak, notes on Midrashim (Livorno, 1765).
