= Naseer al-Chaderchi =

Iraqi politician (1936–2026)

- نصير الجادرجي
- Born: Naseer Kamel al-Chaderchi; 12 August 1936; Baghdad, Iraq
- Died: 12 September 2026 (aged 90); Amman, Jordan
- Occupation: Politician

Naseer Kamel al-Chaderchi (Arabic: نصير الجادرجي; 12 August 1936 – 12 September 2026) was an Iraqi politician who was a member of the Interim Iraq Governing Council, created following the United States's 2003 invasion of Iraq. al-Chaderchi was a Sunni Muslim and the leader of the National Democratic Party. A resident of Baghdad, al-Chaderchi was a lawyer, businessman, and farm owner; his father, Kamel al-Chaderchi was a leader in Iraq's democratic movement before Saddam Hussein's rise to power.

Al-Chaderchi died on 12 September 2026, at the age of 90.

== See also ==
- Politics of Iraq
- List of political parties in Iraq
