= Hadidi =

Hadidi may refer to:

- Hadidi (tribe), Arab tribe found principally in Jordan, but also in Iraq and Syria
- Ismail Ahmed Rajab Al Hadidi, Iraqi politician in Kirkuk

See also

- Hadid (disambiguation)
- Haditha (disambiguation)
