= Sonya Haddad =

Libretto translator and surtitler (1936–2004)

- Born: November 9, 1936; Canton, Ohio, U.S.
- Died: June 15, 2004 (aged 67)
- Education: University of Rochester
- Occupations: Libretto translator and surtitler for the Metropolitan Opera

Sonya Haddad (November 9, 1936 – June 15, 2004) was an American libretto translator and surtitler for the Metropolitan Opera in New York.

== Life and career ==
Haddad was born in Canton, Ohio, on November 9, 1936, and grew up in Akron. She graduated from the Eastman School of Music at the University of Rochester in 1958. She subsequently worked in the classical music division of Columbia Records, and at The New York Times' radio station WQXR. From 1960 until the early 1970s she worked at the Festival of Two Worlds in Spoleto, Italy. During that time, she also lived part-time in Rome where she worked as an interpreter. She acted as courier with the kidnappers of John Paul Getty III in 1973.

External image
- Sonya Haddad

Haddad was fluent in German, Italian and French. She began working at the Metropolitan Opera in 1994 and was referred to in her obituary in The New York Times as "one of the country's leading practitioners of her art". She wrote surtitles or subtitles for the Washington National Opera, La Scala in Milan, and the Public Broadcasting Service's series Great Performances. She joined the editorial staff of Opera News in 1998, and was a research associate for the magazine until her death in 2004. Throughout that time she remained living in the Gershwin Building in Manhattan's Upper West Side.

Brian Kellow said of her in an obituary in Opera News that "As a titlist, her standards were high: she took pains to avoid the cute, the coy, the anachronistic; her titles were as precise and elegant and clearly thought out as her own prose." William Romano, in an article partly based around documentation supplied by Haddad, said of her work that "by extending the text's exposure in live performance by a fraction of a second, the titleist imperceptibly adjusts the viewer's engagement with the words'. He goes on to argue that

Titling challenges titleists and the houses that employ them not only to translate but to make the best case for awkward and weak librettos. The brief, repetitious texts and credulity-straining plots of the bel canto repertory, with their attenuated melodic lines and spectacular runs, can pose more challenges to a titleist than do the complex texts of an opera by Strauss or Wagner. Titling, like any aspect of performance, is a dynamic technical skill, and a titleist may return to an opera in subsequent seasons, adjusting and refining both word choice and the technical aspects of delivery. However the titleist resolves these questions, the resulting version becomes the audience's live-time reading matter.

Operas for which Haddad did the translation and surtitling in the course of her career include: Tchaikovsky's The Queen of Spades in 1995; Prokofiev's War and Peace; Verdi's Falstaff and I vespri siciliani; Richard Strauss's Capriccio; Rossini's La donna del lago; Mozart's Così fan tutte and Don Giovanni; Pergolesi's Lo frate 'nnamorato and Conrad Susa's The Dangerous Liaisons.
