= Leena Al-Hadid =

Jordanian diplomat

Her Excellency The Right Honourable Leena Al-Hadid
- لينا الحديد
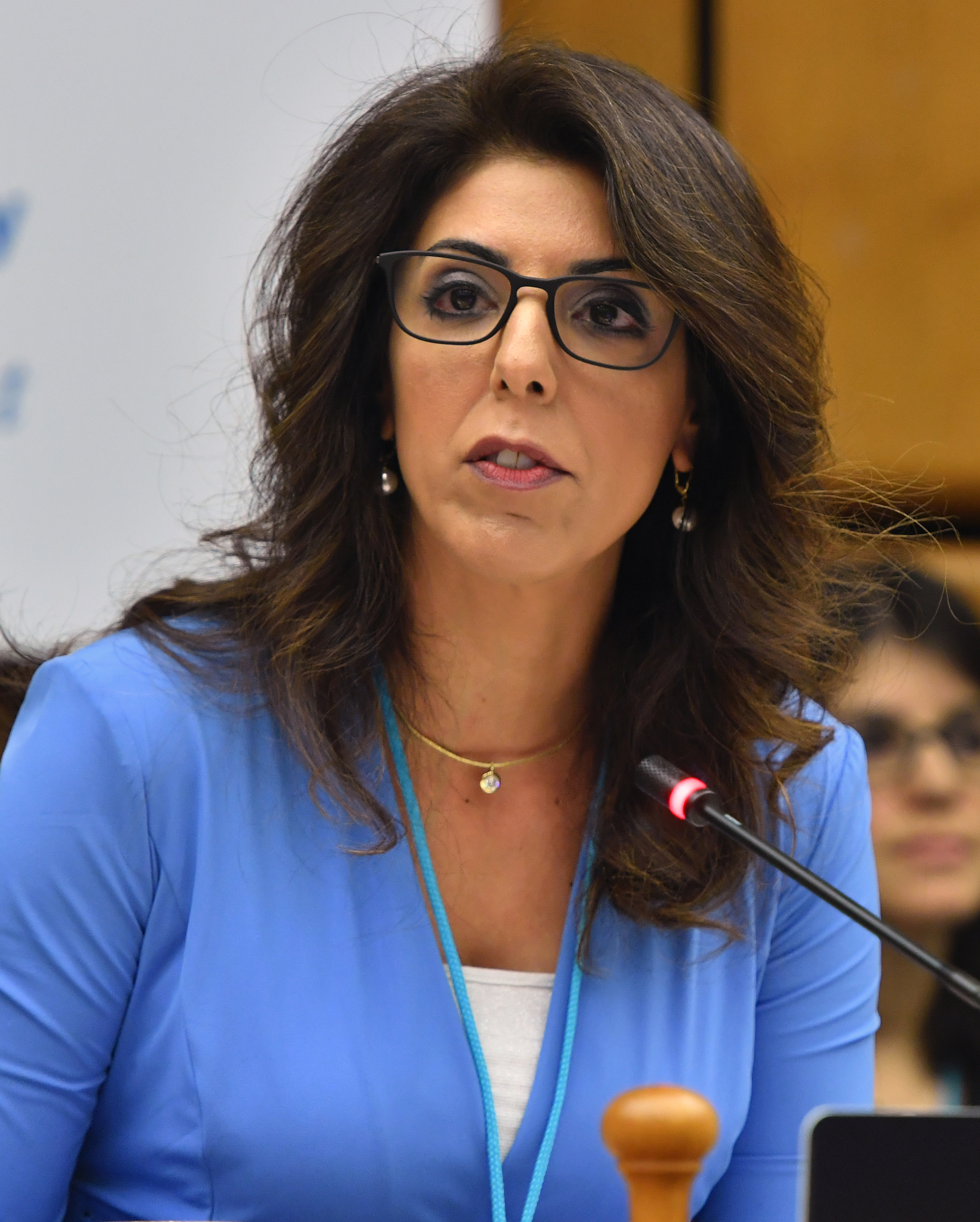
- Ambassador Leena Al-Hadid

Chairperson of the Board of Governors of the International Atomic Energy Agency
- In office September 24, 2018 – September 23, 2019
- Preceded by: Darmansjah Djumala
- Succeeded by: Mikaela Kumlin Granit

Personal details
- Born: 30 January 1971 (age 55) London, England, United Kingdom
- Education: BSc in Law
- Alma mater: University of Jordan
- Occupation: Ambassador Extraordinary and Plenipotentiary of the Hashemite Kingdom of Jordan to Austria, the Czech Republic, Slovakia, Hungary, and Slovenia.

Leena Al-Hadid (Arabic: لينا الحديد, born 30 January 1971) is a Jordanian diplomat, ambassador extraordinary and plenipotentiary to Austria, the Czech Republic, Slovakia, Hungary, and Slovenia. She also serves as Jordan's permanent representative to the Organization for Security and Co-operation in Europe and the United Nations in Vienna. In 2018–2019, she was the elected chairperson of the International Atomic Energy Agency's board of governors.

== Career ==
Hadid studied law at the University of Jordan and started her diplomatic career in 1995 when she joined the Jordanian Foreign Service as political officer at the private office of Jordan's Foreign Minister. She was later relocated as diplomatic attaché to the United Nations and alternate Permanent Representative to the UN in Vienna from 1996 to 2000. Hadid later worked as political officer to Jordan's mission to the European Union in Brussels from 2002 to 2004. From 2004 to 2006, she served as chief diplomatic human rights officer to the Jordanian mission to the United Nations in Geneva. In 2009, she served as deputy consul general in Dubai until 2014. From 2014 to 2018, she worked as director of the Jordanian foreign ministry's international relations & organizations department, as well as deputy director of the department of human rights and humanitarian security which dealt with the Syrian refugee crisis.

In July 2018, Hadid became the Jordanian ambassador to Slovakia. She was appointed as permanent representative of Jordan to the United Nations in Vienna on 11 September 2018. In the same month, she was appointed as Jordan's ambassador to Austria.

On 24 September 2018, she was elected by acclamation to a one-year term as chairperson of the IAEA board of governors. Her tenure as chairperson of the IAEA was marked by the death of director general Yukiya Amano, the setting of the 2020 IAEA budget, and sensitive talks regarding Iran's nuclear program. On 23 September 2019, she was succeeded as IAEA chairperson by the Swedish ambassador to the agency, Mikaela Kumlin Granit.

Al-Hadid serves as ambassador and permanent representative of the Hashemite Kingdom of Jordan to the Organization for Security and Co-operation in Europe (OSCE), and is Jordan's Permanent Representative to the United Nations in Vienna.

In 2023, she is accredited as Ambassador to France. In 2024, her accreditation is extended to the Holy See.

She is fluent in Arabic, French, and English.

== See also ==
- Dina Kawar
- Sima Sami Bahous
