= Kamil Chadirji =

Iraqi politician and leader of the National Democratic Party

Kamil Al Chadirji
- Born: Imran Kamil; 1897 al-Haydarkhana Locality, Baghdad, Ottoman Empire
- Died: February 1968 (aged 71); Baghdad, Iraqi Republic
- Resting place: Tomb of Abdul Qadir al-Kilani, Baghdad
- Occupations: Lawyer, politician
- Political party: National Democratic Party
- Spouse: Muneeba Asif Aref Agha
- Children: 4, including Naseer and Rifat
- Relatives: Raouf Chadirji (brother)

Kamil Chadirji (1897–1968, Arabic: كامل الجادرچي), also spelled Kamil al-Chadirji or Kamel al-Chaderji, was an Iraqi politician, photographer, lawyer, activist, and founder of the National Democratic Party in Iraq. He served as a member of the Chamber of Deputies of Iraq in the 1920s and 1950s. He was the father of notable modernist architect Rifat Chadirji and political leader Naseer al-Chaderchi. He is noted for founding the National Democratic Party with a left-wing program and was an influential political figure in political life who opposed the monarchy and pursued a social reform agenda.

== Early life ==
Chadirji was born in Baghdad to its mayor. His family was a part of the aristocracy, with roots in Anatolia. Chaderji's father played an important role in democratic reform before British rule. During the First World War, he served in the Ottoman Army. When the British took over Iraq as Mandatory Iraq, Chadirji's family escaped to Istanbul, with Chadirji himself enrolling in the medical school there. He never graduated, and instead returned to Baghdad in 1922, following the establishment of the Kingdom of Iraq. He earned a law degree in 1925 and worked for the Municipality of Baghdad as well as for the Department of Finance, working in education.

== Political career ==
=== Kingdom of Iraq ===
In 1925, Chadirji's reformist ideas drew him to the newly formed People's Party (Hizb al-Shab), which he joined. He joined the Ahali group, and was elected to parliament in 1927, becoming the minister of works from 1936 to 1937 under Bakr Sidqi and Hikmat Sulayman's government, resigning in protest against army interference in the government.

In 1930, Chadirji, as a member of the National Party (also known as the Ahali group), worked together with Rashid Ali, Hikmat Sulayman and Yasin al-Hashimi, the leaders of the newly created National Fraternity Party (Hizb al-Ikha al-Watani). The National Party and the National Fraternity Party issued the Coalition "Fraternal" Communique on November 23, 1930. The party was not much of an organized and legitimate political party, instead serving as an opposition from powerful Iraqi political figures to the British. Its ideals were "Immediate independence for Iraq, the evacuation of British troops, and the development of a democratic and participatory Iraqi state," and they pushed their message through their Baghdad newspaper, al-Bilad (The Country).

In 1946, Chadirji, along with other left-wing "intelligentsia" types of the landed urban bourgeoisie (the dominant tendency in these isolated urban middle and upper-class communities) organized themselves into the National Democratic Party. Previously, Chadirji and his group, made of Ahali reformists, had joined the Comintern in 1935 at the Seventh Comintern Congress in Moscow.

Chadirji was moderately anti-Zionist and advocated for strengthening the Arab League. In 1937, while serving as Economic Minister under the government of Hikmat Sulayman, Chadirji held talks with Zionist emissaries. He expressed his sympathies to the Zionist movement and his desire to reach a cooperative agreement for them. However, with the Palestinian question becoming important in Iraq towards the mid-1940s, the NDP increased its Palestine-related activity. In 1946, the Ahali Group's newspaper Sawt al-Ahali published editorials against the partition of Palestine and the creation of Israel. The NDP and other parties (including Jews), especially the Iraqi Independence Party, created the Committee for the Defense of Palestine, which organized protests in front of the American and British embassies, as well as calling for a general strike in May 1946 against Western pressure on Palestine. When the Arab-Israeli War started in 1948, Chadirji wrote and published a front-page editorial for Sawt al-Ahali titled Palestine, which called for Arab countries to come together to defend Palestine. The NDP suspended their activities voluntarily in 1948, but resumed in 1950. Due to Chadirji's will to redistribute income and achieve a more political society, he was imprisoned 2 times in the 1950s. He was sympathetic to pan-Arab ideas.

Sawt al-Ahali also served as an opposition mouthpiece. In 1949, Prime Minister Nuri al-Said had had enough of Sawt al-Ahali and its attacks, so he filed a court case against Chadirji. Chadirji arrived at the courthouse accompanied by 21 defense lawyers. Inside the court, he lectured the prosecution and the judge on democratic values. The proceedings were published in Sawt al-Ahali, and Chadirji was sentenced to 6 months of hard labor. However, the defense appealed the court ruling, and it was taken back by the court.

The NDP helped organized demonstrations in 1948 against the Anglo-Iraqi Treaty (also known as the Portsmouth Treaty). On January 21, the Regent of Iraq called the leaders of the parties involved in the protests to a meeting at the palace. Chadirji explained that the people of Iraq wanted the new, finished constitution to be implemented, and additionally demanded the full freedoms "of the press, association and opinion... and you in your capacity as the defender of the constitution must penalize the government when it behaves [anti-democratically]."

In 1949, Syrian foreign minister Nazim al-Kudsi informed other Arab countries of Syria's desire for federation. Chadirji was skeptical of this proposal, and, as he states in his memoirs, many members of the Iraqi opposition hoped for a collapse of the talks since, if successful, they would strengthen Nuri al-Said and the Sharifian elites.

After the war, Chadirji focused on trying to unite parties into a grand coalition to oppose the monarchy's authoritarianism. Seeing as the Al-Wathbah uprising of 1948 and the Iraqi Intifada of 1952 had failed, he realized that one party was not enough to bring about sufficient change. His efforts ended in the creation of the National Electoral Front (al-Jabha al-Intikhabiya al-Wataniya), consisting of the NDP, the Iraqi Communist Party, and other parties (only 2 groups in the National Front were legal parties), which contested the June 1954 elections, winning 10 out of 135 seats.

Chadirji continued to push his anti-British ideals. In August 1958, he met British Oriental Counselor Samuel Falle, and told him about the Arab perspective of events in the Middle East. Chadirji talked about the inclination of Arab countries to the Soviet Union, their suspicion at American troops in Lebanon, and their perceived threat of British forces in Jordan. He recommended that Britain withdraw from Jordan and allow a plebiscite to happen to decide its fate. However, this talk worked largely in the opposite direction.

=== After the Revolution ===
Following Abd al-Karim Qasim's 14 July Revolution in 1958, the Iraqi monarchy was abolished. Chadirji was supportive of the revolution. The new regime pushed a message of authority and national legitimacy. The NDP chose to align more with the Communists rather than the pan-Arab parties to the right, even though the NDP was a bourgeois party and the ICP represented the working class. After the Revolution, they formed an immediate alliance with the Communists, but a stable coalition was not achieved, as the alliance came under constant attacks from Ba'athists and Nasserists. The NDP was weakened first, and then the ICP. Chadirji disliked Qasim's politics – he believed that Qasim had no real political convictions, and likened him to a rope-dancer, who would "swing from one ideology to another to remain in power" just like a rope-dancer would swing from side to side to remain balanced.

In 1963, Chadirji, with the NDP now dissolved, sent a memorandum to Iraqi Field Marshal Abdel-Salam Aref, calling for democracy in Iraq.

On February 2, 1968, Chadirji died at the age of 71 from a heart attack. At about the same time, the NDP called for the signing of a "revolutionary covenant" to oppose the Ba'ath regime and create a popular democratic one.

== Private life ==
He was an enthusiastic amateur photographer. After retiring, he travelled across Iraq photographing street life, buildings, historic monuments. He and his son, Rifat, were afraid that Iraq would lose its historic and vernacular architecture as the country embarked on a program of “modernisation” and sought to document what might be lost forever. His son, Rifat, later recalled travelling around the country with his father taking photographs of the people, their culture and their buildings in an effort to preserve Iraq's culture and history that was in danger of being lost as Iraq on a program of modernisation.

Rifat Chadirji explained his father's interest in photography, "His early cameras were the large type that required a particular kind of knowledge in order to operate. He had a bunch of books in his library on how to use a camera. He had several cameras, some of which were the old bulky kind, in which he had to stick his head under a leather cover. Then the new cameras became available, and he bought a small Contax. He developed his own photographs in a dark room at our house. No one in our family, or our friends, had a camera back then. My father was the only one with a camera, going around Baghdad and the rest of Iraq, photographing markets, crafts, and other things. It used to be a hobby that he enjoyed on his own, as his politician friends did not share the same interest. He bought me a small camera when I was in primary school. He guided me through the process and taught me how to take good photographs.

== Legacy ==
Following his death, a collection of his photographic negatives was found in a tin box, allowing his son, Rifat Chadirji to publish a book of his photographs. The book documents the built environment, daily life, cultural engagement, and social conditions in the Middle East from the 1920s – 1940s.
