= Barjas al-Hadid =

Jordanian politician

Sheikh Barjas Al-Hadid
- Born: 1936 (age 89–90); Emirate of Transjordan

Sheikh Barjas Shaher Sayel Al-Hadid - (born in 1936), also known locally as Abu Nidal (The Father of Nidal) Barjas Al Hadid, is a Jordanian politician and Sheikh of the prominent Al-Hadid tribe and member of the Parliament of Jordan.

== Education, military and political career ==
In 1957, Al-Hadid attended military college in Cairo, but his education was ended early by a serious injury sustained in a light aircraft. After recovering, he rose to the rank of lieutenant colonel, of the Royal Jordanian Air Force and worked at Amir Faisal Military College until 1976. His political career began in 1984, when he joined the Amman City Council, where he served for two years, after which he was appointed to an eight-year term as one of 40 Senators in the upper chamber of the National Assembly. In 1997, Al-Hadid was elected to the Chamber of Deputies for the fourth electoral district in Amman; and was reelected in 2003.

== Tribal leadership ==
As leader of the 30,000-member Balqa Governorate-based Al-Hadid tribe, Al-Hadid's duties have included mediating in disputes, including blood feuds, which arise between Jordanian tribe and clan members, within whose families tribal law still exists. Significant numbers of the Al-Hadid tribe are also found in Syria; where they come under the name Hadidi, (estimated to be around half a million 500,000 - one of the largest tribes within Syria; and in Iraq they number around 400,000) the Sheikh has been dispatched in the past to Saudi Arabia, Iraq and Yemen in order to mediate.

== Personal life ==
Al-Hadid is married to Noof Salim Khair, with whom he has five children: Nidal, who was the mayor of Amman, worked in the Jordanian Football Association, and was a FIFA Development Officer for most Arabic countries; Muhammed, a major in the intelligence services; Hussam, a businessman; and his daughters Arwa and Hala. His father, Shaher, and cousin, Minwer, fought in the Arab Revolt which installed King Abdullah as ruler, and took an oath of loyalty to the king. This contributed to the close relationship shared between the two families, and upon his death Sheikh Shaher was buried in the royal cemetery at Al-Maquar, Amman.

When not engaged on parliamentary, family and private business, Barjas spends his time resolving tribal disputes and interceding to advance the interests not only of members of his Al-Hadid tribe, but of others who appeal for his assistance.

== Family history ==
Barjas Al-Hadid is a pillar of the East Bank establishment whose tribal family have offered the ruling Hashemite royal family loyalty since Prince Abdullah arrived in the city of Ma'an in 1921 to claim Transjordan for the Hashemites. 'King Hussein was born in 1935' relates Barjas, "for the first 3 months of his life he had a wet nurse who was a Hadid. The wet nurse; named Dela Al-Hadid, is the mother to Hmoud Hamad Al-Hadid and the Grandmother to Colonel Maher Hmoud Al-Hadid. "When my Father Shaher died in 1947, when I was only nine years old, King Abdullah insisted that he be buried in the royal family's cemetery, above the Raghadan palace in Amman".

The Hadid tribal history and hence Barjas' family history is interwoven with the history of Jordan. "We took part in the Arab revolt against the Ottoman Empire, with Prince Faisal, and we fought against the French in Syria" says Barjas with Pride. "We fought at the battle of Maisaloun, my father Shaher and his cousin Minwer and many from our tribe were there".

Al-Hadid's position as elected Member of Parliament came partially as a result of the large amount of land owned by his tribe and the influence it brings (traditionally the Al-Hadid family have owned all of the lands of Amman, the modern-day capital of Jordan); this has historically resulted in the Al-Hadid family being one of the wealthiest families in the Kingdom of Jordan.

Using this land wealth they have donated some of their lands to numerous good causes throughout Jordan's history, most notably the land around Central Amman for the creation of Amman's Italian Hospital - also known as Mustashfa Italiani, In addition to this they also donated lands in the Al-Wehdat area of Amman for the building of refugee camps for Palestinians that fled Palestine in 1948, during the Nakba period. These refugee camps are still in existence today.

Between 1947 and 1967 a member of the Hadids occupied a seat in the Chamber of Deputies.
