= National Democratic Party (Iraq, 1946) =

National Democratic Party الحزب الوطني الديمقراطي
- Founder: Kamel al-Chaderji
- Founded: 1946
- Dissolved: 1963
- Preceded by: (Ahali group)
- Succeeded by: National Democratic Party
- Ideology: Social democracy; Democratic socialism
- Political position: Centre-left

The National Democratic Party (Arabic: الحزب الوطني الديمقراطي, Hizb al Wataniyah al Dimuqratiyah) was an Iraqi political party.

The party was founded in 1946 as a left-leaning opposition movement that modeled itself after the British Labour Party and grouped the non-Communist left-wing members of the former Ahali group, of which five out of its eight cofounders had been members. It advocated workers' rights, land reform and social democracy.

At the 1948 Iraqi parliamentary election, the NDP got 2 seats out of 138.

The party was closely linked with the government of Abd al-Karim Qasim, in which, out of fourteen ministers, three (Finances, Agriculture, Guiding) were NDP members, one (Foreign Affairs) was 'close to NDP', and two (Development, Communications) were former NDP members, all either Arab Sunnis, Arab Shias or Kurdish Sunni.

With the Nasserite coup in 1963, the party officially ceased to exist.

It was however revived in 2003 under the same name by Naseer al-Chaderchi, son of NDP former leader Kamil al-Chaderchi.
