= George Ibrahim Haddad =

Jordanian writer

- جورج حداد
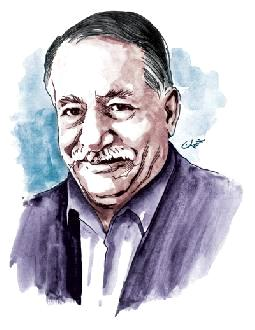
- Education: Beirut Arab University
- Writing career
- Genre: Poetry

George Ibrahim Haddad (Arabic: جورج حداد; 1934–2009) was a national Jordanian writer, poet and journalist and the founder of the Hebrew section in the Jordanian television, as his work of newsletters and political comments then had the most significant impact among the Hebrew society, even that Golda Meir– 4th Prime Minister of Israel– said about him during the 1973 war: "Israel had never faced in its history a nation with such a brutal psychological war as the one the Jordanian television waged." The 27th of June is his memorial day.

George Haddad was born in the Jordanian city of Salt and lived in Irbid. He studied the language arts at Beirut Arab University (BAU). He started his career as a teacher; he was a pioneer in teaching like the most of his generation in Jordan, not only he knew syntax and morphology; but he also planted the awareness of leading their nations, the right of their nation upon them and the facts of the conflict with the colonizer, within the conscious of his students.

== Career ==
He moved to media in 1971, working with the Jordanian radio, he worked as the chief of the political department then he moved to work in the Jordanian television as a political analyst and the founder of the Hebrew section, and was appointed as its head, then he was appointed as the manager for the news department in the television in 1974. Then as a political adviser in the ministry of media. In his time working in the Jordanian radio George met the martyr president Wasfi Al Tal, and he believed in Al Tal's project and approach, for building the modern Jordanian nation and its renaissance unionist speech, and this subject is objectively against the Hebrew project, and it is also against it judging by the construction and configuration and speech. And his relationship with president Al Tal flourished on a remarkable level; so he became closest to him, joined by the same intellectual and political orientation.

=== Al Ra'i Newspaper ===
He also had a daily job as a political writer in Al Ra'i newspaper since its establishment and until the beginning of the 1980s, then he transferred to Addustour newspaper where he wrote his thoughts and social and intellectual and philosophical analysis under the column "Hazzet Ghrbal" (which means the "shake of a sieve").

=== King Faisal of Saudi Arabia ===
King Faisal bin Abdulaziz was the King of Saudi Arabia, and was extremely fond with reading his articles. George Haddad was the first journalist who had the courage to praise Hamas Movement and its founder Ahmad Yaseen, and he had done so by writing a number of articles since it has started. He has some sung folkloric poems, as he noticed earlier to the importance of folk songs, and their role in transmitting the value of love, giving and life; he wrote a part of the words of the inspirational songs that the heritage and local folk share, he also prefers to talk in the known slang language in his dialogue despite his abundance in writing language.

=== Zionism ===
The columnist Fu'ad Husain described him saying: "George Haddad adored the valleys of Houran, and the mountains of Salt, and the streets of Amman, as he adored the alleys of Baghdad, and the people of Jerusalem, and Qasoun Mountain, all were to him parts of Great Syria and they are to its people and no one else, and the Zionists where only like the franks before them just passing by and nothing but passing words, as his grandparents fought the franks who tried to steal Christianity from its people in the east, George Haddad was fighting and rallying against the Zionist occupation, that occupation that despite its growth and strength it did not worry him, on the contrary, his mind was at comfort knowing that it is just a matter of time, and they will be gone exactly like all the invaders before them."

== Bibliography ==
- غربالجورج-حدادوداعاً
