= Alhambra (disambiguation) =

The Alhambra is a palace in Granada, Spain.

Alhambra may also refer to:

== Places ==
=== United States ===
- Alhambra, Missouri, a ghost town in Stoddard County
- Alhambra, Phoenix, an urban village in Phoenix, Arizona
- Alhambra, California, a city in Los Angeles County
- Alhambra, Illinois, a village in Madison County
- Alhambra, Louisiana, an unincorporated community
- Alhambra, Montana, a community in Jefferson County

=== Other places ===
- Alhambra, Alberta, in Canada
- Alhambra, Ciudad Real, a municipality in Ciudad Real, Castile-La Mancha, Spain

== Theatres and other venues ==
=== Europe ===
- Alhambra-Maurice Chevalier, a music hall in Paris (1866–1967)
- Alhambra (Paris), music hall in Paris, opened 2008
- Alhambra, Blackpool, an entertainment complex in Blackpool, Lancashire, England, from 1899 to 1903
- Alhambra Copenhagen (1855–1870), a large entertainment-complex, built in 1857 in Copenhagen, Denmark
- Alhambra Theatre, Bradford, West Yorkshire, England, opened in 1914
- Alhambra Theatre, Dunfermline, Scotland, opened in 1922
- Alhambra Theatre Glasgow, opened on 19 December 1910
- Alhambra Theatre, Manchester, in Higher Openshaw, Manchester, England, was opened in 1910
- Alhambra Theatre of Variety, London

=== North America ===
- Alhambra Theatre (El Paso, Texas), opened 1914
- Alhambra Theatorium, Evansville, Indiana
- The Harlem Alhambra, Manhattan, New York
- Alhambra Dinner Theatre, Jacksonville, Florida
- Alhambra Arena, sporting venue, Philadelphia
- Alhambra Theatre (Sacramento), California
- Alhambra Theatre (San Francisco), California

=== Other theatres ===
- Alhambra Cinema, an Art Deco building in Jaffa, Tel Aviv, Israel
- Alhambra Music Hall, Sydney, a former music hall

== Games ==
- Alhambra (board game), a popular German board game
- Alhambra (solitaire), a card game
- Alhambra (video game), the Xbox Live Arcade version of the aforementioned board game

== People ==
- Miirrha Alhambra (1890–1957), stage name of the French-born pianist Pauline Joutard
- Alhambra Nievas (born 1983), former Spain women's rugby union international and a current rugby union referee

== Other uses ==
- The Alhambra, original title of the book Tales of the Alhambra by Washington Irving
- Alhambra (1855), a British ship wrecked in 1888
- Alhambra (EP), a 1996 EP by The Tea Party
- Alhambra Decree, a royal decree issued in 1492 ordering the expulsion or conversion of all the Jews in Spain
- Alhambra International Guitar Competition, a classical guitar competition founded by Alhambra Guitarras
- Alhambra Publishing, a Swedish publishing house
- Alhambra Shopping Centre in Barnsley, England
- Cervezas Alhambra, a Spanish brand of beer
- Order of Alhambra, a Catholic fraternal order
- SEAT Alhambra, a multi-purpose vehicle made by Spanish car maker SEAT
- Alhambra, a former folly by William Chambers that stood in Kew Gardens, London

== See also ==
- Alhambra High School (disambiguation)
- Hamra (disambiguation)
- Memories of the Alhambra, a South Korean TV series which aired in 2018
- Recuerdos de la Alhambra, a classical guitar piece Francisco Tárrega
