= Hamra =

Hamra: Al-Ḥamrāʾ means "the red one" in Arabic. It may refer to:

== Places ==
=== Israel ===
- Al-Hamra', a depopulated Arab village near Safad
- Al-Hamra, Baysan, a depopulated Arab village near Baysan

=== Lebanon ===
- Hamra, Beirut, a neighborhood
- Hamra Street, a street in Beirut known as Rue Hamra or "Beirut's Champs Elysées"

=== Oman ===
- Al Hamra, Oman, a historic town

=== Saudi Arabia ===
- Al Hamra', Al Madinah
- Al Hamra (Riyadh)
- Al Hamra Palace (Riyadh)

=== Spain ===
- Alhambra (Al-Hamra in Arabic), a fortress and palace in Andalusia

=== Syria ===
- Al-Hamraa, a town in the vicinity of Hama
- Al-Hamra, al-Suqaylabiyah, a town in the al-Suqaylabiyah District

=== Sweden ===
- Hamra, Gotland, a settlement
  - Hamra formation, a Silurian sedimentary rock formation on the island of Gotland
- Hamra National Park

=== West Bank ===
- Hamra, Bik'at HaYarden, an Israeli settlement

=== Yemen ===
- Bayt al-Hamra', a village in Sanaa Governorate

== Other uses ==
- 9373 Hamra, a main-belt asteroid
- Battle of Hamra al-Asad, a battle in 625 AD (3 AH) in which the Islamic prophet Muhammad participated
- Hamra (Mandaeism), water mixed with mashed raisins that is used in Mandaean rituals

== See also ==
- Alhambra (disambiguation)
- Al Jazirah Al Hamra, United Arab Emirates
