= Faisal I =

King of Iraq from 1921 to 1933

Faisal I فيصل الأول
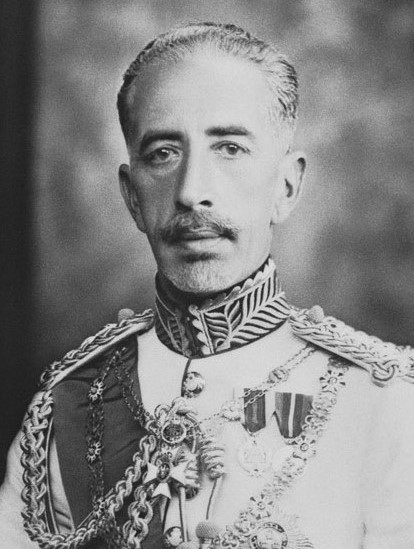
- Formal portrait, c. 1933

King of Iraq
- Reign: 23 August 1921 – 8 September 1933
- Predecessor: Military occupation
- Successor: Ghazi I
- Prime Ministers: See list: Abd al-Rahman al-Gillani Abd al-Muhsin as-Sa'dun Jafar al-Askari Yasin al-Hashimi Tawfiq al-Suwaidi Naji al-Suwaidi Nuri al-Said Naji Shawkat Rashid Ali al-Gaylani

King of Syria
- Reign: 8 March 1920 – 25 July 1920
- Predecessor: Military occupation
- Successor: Monarchy abolished
- Prime Ministers: See list: Rida Pasha al-Rikabi Hashim al-Atassi
- Born: 20 May 1883; Mecca, Hejaz Vilayet, Ottoman Empire
- Died: 8 September 1933 (aged 50); Bern, Switzerland
- Burial: Iraqi Royal Cemetery
- Spouses: Huzaima bint Nasser (m. 1904)
- Issue: Princess Azza; Princess Rajiha; Princess Rafia; Ghazi I
Names
- Faisal bin Hussein bin Ali Al-Hashemi
- House: Hashemite
- Father: Hussein bin Ali, King of Hejaz
- Mother: Abdiyah bint Abdullah
- Religion: Sunni Islam
- Military career
- Allegiance: Kingdom of Hejaz (1916–1920); Arab Kingdom of Syria (1920); Kingdom of Iraq (1921–1933)
- Wars: Arab Revolt (1916–1918); Franco-Syrian War (1920)

Faisal I bin Hussein bin Ali al-Hashimi (Arabic: فيصل بن حسين بن علي الهاشمي, romanized: Fayṣal bin Ḥusayn bin ʻAlī al-Hāshimī; 20 May 1885 – 8 September 1933) was a Hejazi statesman who served as the King of Iraq from 23 August 1921 until his death in 1933. A member of the Hashemite family, he was a leader of the Great Arab Revolt during the First World War, and ruled as the unrecognized King of the Arab Kingdom of Syria from March to July 1920 when he was expelled by the French.

The third son of Hussein bin Ali, the Grand Emir and Sharif of Mecca, Faisal was born in Mecca and raised in Istanbul. From 1916 to 1918, with British assistance, he played a major role in the revolt against the Ottoman Empire. He helped set up an Arab government in Syria, based in Damascus, and led the Arab delegation at the Paris Peace Conference in 1919. In 1920, the Syrian National Congress proclaimed Faisal king, rejecting the French claim to a Mandate for Syria. In response, France invaded a few months later, abolished the kingdom and forced him into exile.

In August 1921, in accordance with the decision made at the Cairo Conference, the British arranged for Faisal to become king of a new Kingdom of Iraq under British administration. During his reign, Faisal fostered unity between Sunni Muslims and Shia Muslims to encourage common loyalty and promote pan-Arabism in the goal of creating an Arab state that would include Iraq, Syria and the rest of the Fertile Crescent. In 1932, he presided over the independence of the Kingdom of Iraq upon the end of the British Mandate and the country's entry into the League of Nations. Faisal died of a heart attack in 1933 in Bern, Switzerland, at the age of 50 and was succeeded by his eldest son Ghazi.

== Early life ==
Faisal was born in Mecca, Ottoman Empire (in present-day Saudi Arabia), in 1885, the third son of Hussein bin Ali, the Grand Sharif of Mecca. He grew up in Constantinople and learned about leadership from his father. In 1913, he was elected as representative for the city of Jeddah for the Ottoman parliament.

Following the Ottoman Empire's declaration of war against the Entente in December 1914, Faisal's father sent him on a mission to Constantinople to discuss the Ottomans' request for Arab participation in the war. Along the way Faisal visited Damascus and met with representatives of the Arab secret societies al-Fatat and Al-'Ahd. After visiting Constantinople Faisal returned to Mecca via Damascus where he again met with the Arab secret societies, received the Damascus Protocol, and joined with the al-Fatat group of Arab nationalists.

== World War I and the Great Arab Revolt ==
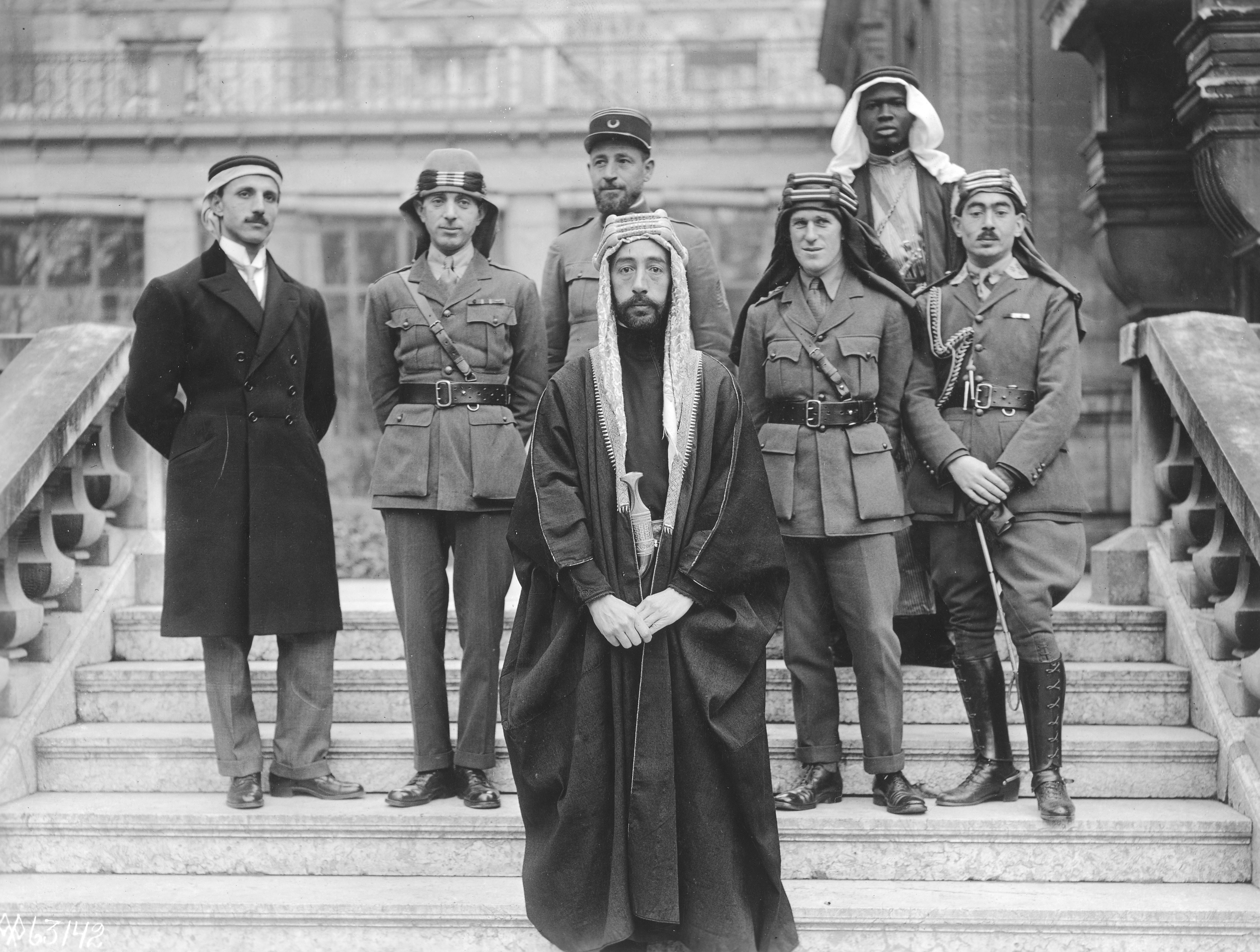
Emir Faisal's delegation at Versailles, during the Paris Peace Conference of 1919. Left to right: Rustum Haidar, Nuri as-Said, Prince Faisal, Captain Pisani (behind Faisal), T. E. Lawrence, unknown member of his delegation, Captain Tahsin Kadry.

On 23 October 1916 at Hamra in Wadi Safra, Faisal met Captain T. E. Lawrence, a junior British intelligence officer from Cairo. Lawrence, who envisioned an independent post-war Arabian state, sought the right man to lead the Hashemite forces and achieve this. In 1916–18, Faisal headed the Northern Army of the rebellion that confronted the Ottomans in what was to later become western Saudi Arabia, Jordan and Syria.

In 1917, Faisal, desiring an empire for himself instead of conquering one for his father, attempted to negotiate an arrangement with the Ottomans under which he would rule the Ottoman vilayets of Syria and Mosul as an Ottoman vassal. In December 1917 Faisal contacted General Djemal Pasha declaring his willingness to defect to the Ottoman side provided they would give him an empire to rule, saying the Sykes–Picot Agreement had disillusioned him in the Allies and he now wanted to work with his fellow Muslims. Only the unwillingness of the Three Pashas to subcontract ruling part of the Ottoman Empire to Faisal kept him loyal to his father when it finally dawned on him that the Ottomans were just trying to divide and conquer the Hashemite forces.

In his book Seven Pillars of Wisdom, Lawrence sought to put the best gloss on Faisal's double-dealing as it would contradict the image he was seeking to promote of Faisal as a faithful friend of the Allies betrayed by the British and the French, claiming that Faisal was only seeking to divide the "nationalist" and "Islamist" factions in the ruling Committee of Union and Progress (CUP). The Israeli historians Efraim Karsh and his wife Inari wrote that the veracity of Lawrence's account is open to question given that the major dispute within the CUP was not between the Islamist Djemal Pasha and the nationalist Mustafa Kemal as claimed by Lawrence, but rather between Enver Pasha and Djemal Pasha.

In the spring of 1918, after Germany launched Operation Michael on 21 March 1918, which appeared for a time to foreordain the defeat of the Allies, Faisal again contacted Djemal Pasha asking for peace provided that he be allowed to rule Syria as an Ottoman vassal, which Djemal, confident of victory, declined to consider. After a 30-month-long siege, he conquered Medina, defeating the defence organised by Fakhri Pasha and looted the city. Emir Faisal also worked with the Allies during World War I in their conquest of the region of Syria and the capture of Damascus in October 1918. Faisal became part of a new Arab government at Damascus, formed after the capture of that city in 1918. Emir Faisal's role in the Arab Revolt was described by Lawrence in Seven Pillars of Wisdom. However, the accuracy of that book, not least the importance given by the author to his own contribution during the Revolt, has been criticized by some historians, including David Fromkin.

== Post-World War I ==
=== Participation in the Paris Peace Conference ===
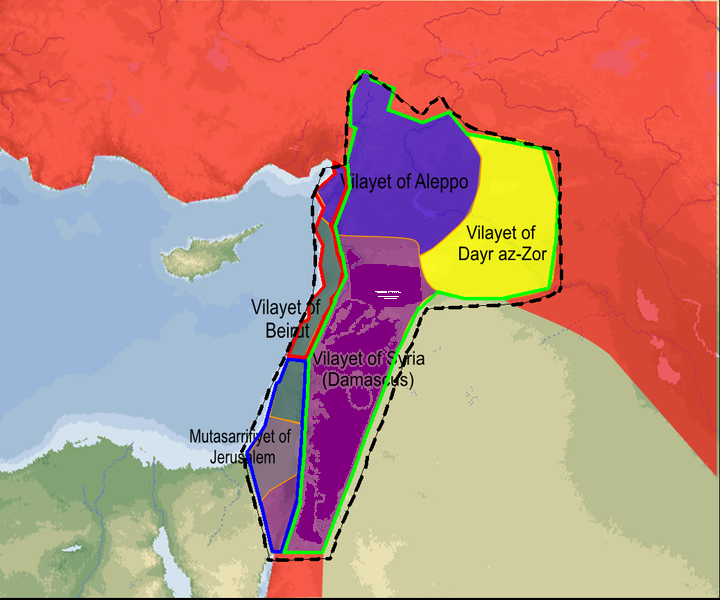
The Kingdom of Syria in 1918

In 1919, Emir Faisal led the Arab delegation to the Paris Peace Conference and, with the support of the knowledgeable and influential Gertrude Bell, argued for the establishment of independent Arab emirates for the predominantly Arab areas previously held by the Ottoman Empire.

=== Greater Syria ===
British and Arab forces took Damascus in October 1918, which was followed by the Armistice of Mudros. With the end of Turkish rule that October, Faisal helped set up an Arab government, under British protection, in Arab controlled Greater Syria. In May 1919, elections were held for the Syrian National Congress, which met the following month.

=== Faisal–Weizmann Agreement ===
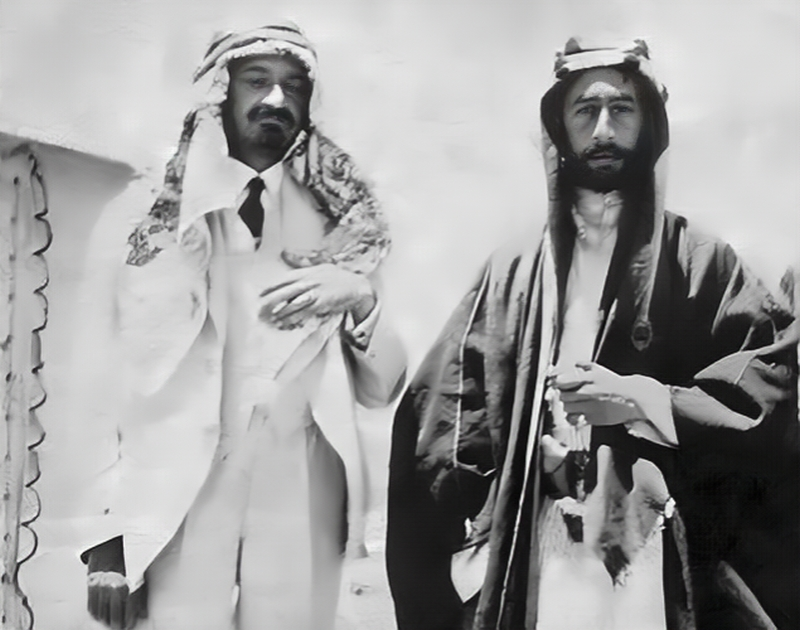
Faisal (right) with Chaim Weizmann in Syria, 1918

On 4 January 1919, Emir Faisal and Chaim Weizmann, President of the Zionist Organization, signed the Faisal–Weizmann Agreement for Arab-Jewish Cooperation, in which Faisal conditionally accepted the Balfour Declaration, an official declaration on behalf of the British government by Arthur Balfour, promising British support to the development of a Jewish national home in Palestine. Once Arab states were granted autonomy from the European powers, years after the Faisal-Weizmann Agreement, and these new Arab nations were recognized by the Europeans, Weizmann argued that since the fulfillment was kept eventually, the agreement for a Jewish homeland in Palestine still held.

In truth, this hoped-for partnership had little chance of success and was a dead letter by late 1920. Faisal had hoped that Zionist influence on British policy would be sufficient to forestall French designs on Syria, but Zionist influence could never compete with French interests. At the same time, Faisal failed to enlist significant sympathy among his Arab elite supporters for the idea of a Jewish homeland in Palestine, even under loose Arab suzerainty.

Following the decisions taken by the San Remo conference in April 1920, on 13 May 1920, Lord Allenby forwarded to the British War Cabinet a letter from Faisal which stated his opposition to the Balfour proposal to establish a homeland for the Jews in Palestine.

== King of Syria ==
On 8 March 1920, Faisal was proclaimed King of the Arab Kingdom of Syria (the region of Syria) by the Syrian National Congress government of Hashim al-Atassi. In April 1920, the San Remo conference gave France the Mandate for Syria and the Lebanon, which led to the Franco-Syrian War. In the Battle of Maysalun on 24 July 1920, the French were victorious and Faisal was expelled from Syria.

== King of Iraq ==
=== Accession to the Iraqi throne ===
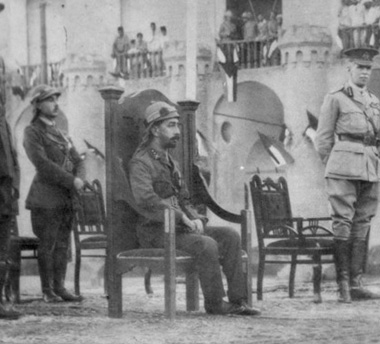
The Coronation of Faisal as King of Iraq. Faisal seated, to his right are British High commissioner Percy Cox and Lieutenant Kinahan Cornwallis, to his left commander-in-chief of all British troops in the Mesopotamia Commander General Aylmer Haldane.

In the winter of 1920, Iraqis gathered in sociable meetings in coffeehouses and tents to discuss which form of government and leader the new Iraqi state should have. The British government, mandate holders in Iraq, were concerned at the unrest in the colony. They decided to step back from direct administration and create a monarchy to head Iraq while they maintained the mandate. The idea was to set up a native leader who would be popular among the Iraqi people while still maintaining close relations with the British government.

In March 1921, at the Cairo Conference, the British decided that Faisal was a good candidate for ruling the British Mandate of Iraq because of his apparent conciliatory attitude towards the Great Powers and based on advice from T. E. Lawrence, more commonly known as Lawrence of Arabia. In 1921, few people in Iraq even knew who Faisal was or had heard his name. With help of British officials, including Gertrude Bell, he successfully campaigned among the Arabs of Iraq and won over the popular support of the minority Sunni.

The Shia majority were at first lukewarm about Faisal, and his appearance at the port of Basra was met with indifference. From 23 April to 8 May 1921, Iraqis including most notably Nuri Pasha al-Sa'id sent telegrams to Faisal, inviting him to Iraq as its prospective king. Between May and June, Faisal sent representatives to confirm his election.

On 12 June 1921, Faisal left Jeddah for Iraq alongside several Iraqi nobles and Sir Kinahan Cornwallis on the RIMS Northbrook, and on 23 June, Faisal first landed in Iraq on the main port of Basra. Faisal's arrival was met with a mixed response, while most Iraqis welcomed him in large numbers and groups, some people, especially the Ulama' at Najaf and the tribesman of Southern Iraq, including Samawah, were either disappointed or hostile which shocked Faisal.

Despite this, the Mayor of Baghdad at the time sent a telegram to greet Faisal. The city of Hillah also welcomed him. When Faisal arrived in Baghdad on 26 June, he was widely welcomed by Baghdadis. The next day, an ovation was given to him in al-Kadhimiyya, where he prayed at its main mosque and was welcomed.

Faisal became a candidate for King of Iraq alongside other candidates such as the Sayyid Muhammad al-Sadr, and Ali Jawdat al-Ayyubi. Following a plebiscite showing 96% in favor, Faisal agreed to become king. On 23 August 1921, he was made king of Iraq. Iraq was a new political entity created after World War I from Ottoman Iraq, which had consisted largely of the Ottoman vilayets (provinces) of Mosul, Baghdad and Basra. Ottoman vilayets were usually named after their capital, and thus the Basra vilayet was southern Iraq. Given this background, there was no sense of Iraqi nationalism or even Iraqi national identity when Faisal took his throne. Anecdotally, the band present played God Save the King, as Iraq did not yet have a national anthem and would not have one until 1932.

=== Reign ===
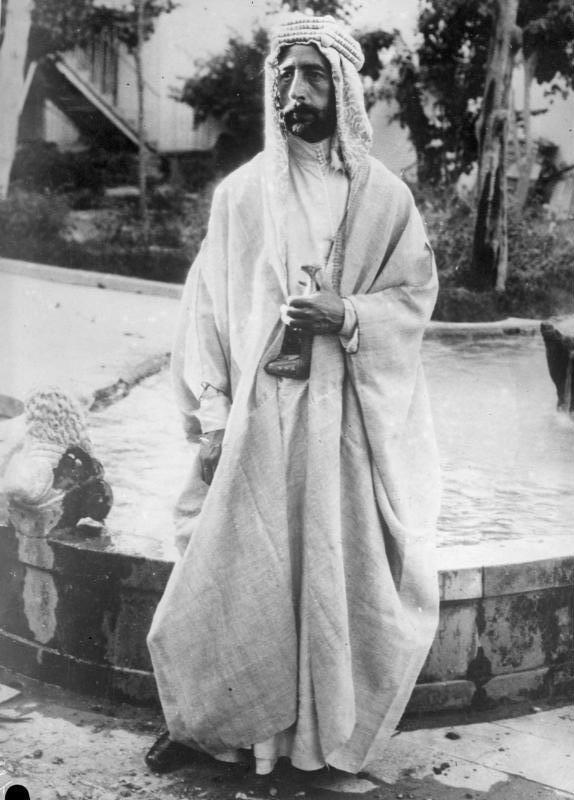
King Faisal I of Iraq

During his reign as King, Faisal encouraged pan-Arab nationalism that envisioned ultimately bringing the French mandates of Syria and Lebanon together with the British mandate of Palestine under his rule. Faisal was keenly aware that his power-base was with the Sunni Muslim Arabs of Iraq, who comprised a significant minority. By contrast, if Syria, Lebanon and Palestine were incorporated into his realm, then the Sunni Muslim Arabs would comprise the majority of his subjects, making the Arab Shi'i Muslim and the ethnic Kurds of Iraq into minorities.

The Arab Shi'i Muslims of Iraq at the time had traditionally looked towards Persia for leadership, and the rallying cry of Pan-Arabism might unite the Arab Sunnis and Shi'a around a common sense of Arab identity. In Iraq, a majority of the Arabs were Shi'i Muslims who had not responded to the call for Sharif Hussein to join the "Great Arab Revolt" as the Sharif was a considered a Sunni Muslim from the Hejaz, thus making him a double outsider.

Rather than risk the wrath of the Ottomans on behalf of an outsider like Hussein, the Shi'i Muslims of Iraq had ignored the Great Arab Revolt. In the Ottoman Empire, the state religion was Sunni Islam and the Shi'i Muslim had been marginalized for their religion, making the Shia population poorer and less educated than the Sunni population.

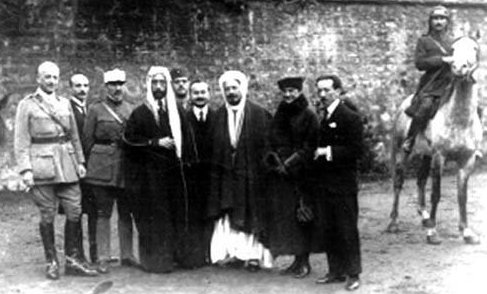
King Faisal I in Syria 1920

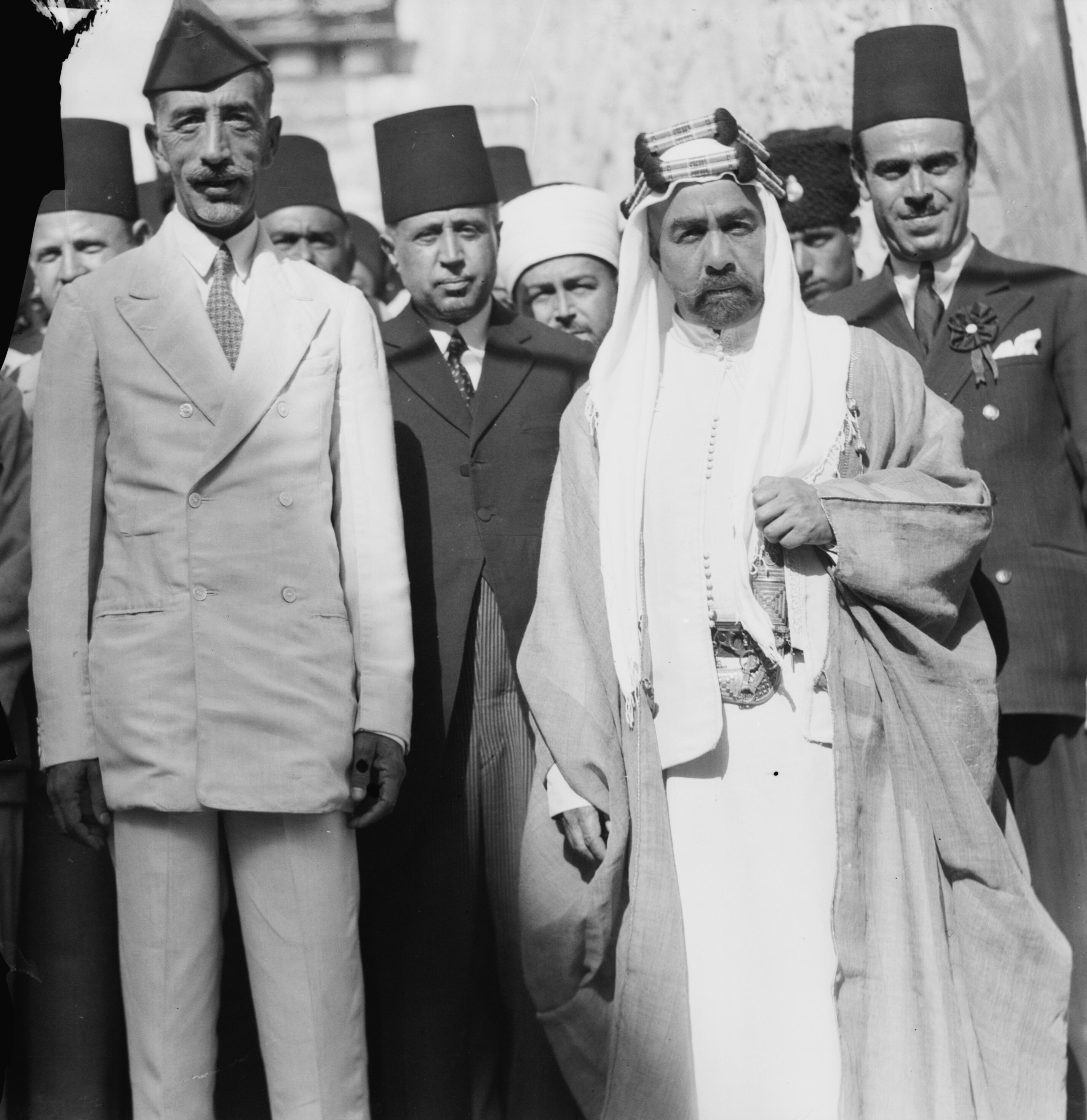
King Faisal I of Iraq and his brother then Emir Abdullah of Transjordan in Jerusalem, Mandatory Palestine, 1933

Faisal himself was a tolerant man, proclaiming himself a friend of the Shi'i Muslim, Kurdish and Jewish communities in his realm. In 1928, he criticized the policy of some of his ministers of seeking to fire all Jewish Iraqis from the civil service. His policy of promoting pan-Arab nationalism to further his personal and dynastic ambitions proved to be a disruptive force in Iraq, as it drew a wedge between the Arab and Kurdish communities. Faisal's policy of equating wataniyya ("patriotism" or in this case Iraqiness) with being Arab marginalized the Kurds who feared that they had no place in an Arab-dominated Iraq, indeed in a state that equated being Iraqi with being Arab.

Faisal also developed desert motor routes from Baghdad to Damascus, and Baghdad to Amman. This led to a great interest in the Mosul oilfield and eventually to his plan to build an oil pipeline to a Mediterranean port, which would help Iraq economically. This also led to an increase in Iraq's desire for more influence in the Arab East. During his reign, Faisal made great effort to build Iraq's army into a powerful force. He attempted to impose universal military service in order to achieve this, but this failed. Some see this as part of his plan to advance his pan-Arab agenda.

During the Great Syrian Revolt against French rule in Syria, Faisal was not particularly supportive of the rebels partly because of British pressure, partly because of his own cautious nature, and mainly because he had reason to believe that the French were interested in installing a Hashemite to govern Syria on their behalf. In 1925, after the Syrian Druze uprising, the French government began consulting Faisal on Syrian matters. He advised the French to restore Hashemite power in Damascus. The French consulted Faisal because they were inspired by his success as an imposed leader in Iraq. As it turned out, the French were merely playing Faisal along as they wished to give him the impression that he might be restored as king of Syria to dissuade him from supporting the Syrian rebels, and once they crushed the Syrian revolt, they lost interest in having a Hashemite rule in Syria.

Faisal saw the Anglo-Iraqi Treaty of 1930 as an obstacle to his pan-Arab views, although it provided Iraq with a degree of political independence. He wanted to make sure that the treaty had a built-in end date because the treaty further divided Syria and Iraq, the former which was under French control, and the latter under British rule. This prevented unity between two major Arab regions, which were important in Faisal's pan-Arab agenda.

Ironically, Arab nationalists in Iraq had a positive reception to the treaty because they saw this as progress, which seemed better than the Arab situation in Syria and Palestine. Faisal's schemes for a greater Iraqi-Syrian state under his leadership attracted much opposition from Turkey, which preferred to deal with two weak neighbors instead of one strong one, and from King Fuad I of Egypt and Ibn Saud of Hejaz and Nejd, who both saw themselves as the rightful leaders of the Arab world.

When Nuri al-Said visited Yemen in May 1931 to ask the Imam Yahya Muhammad Hamid ed-Din if he was interested in joining the "Arab Alliance" under Faisal's leadership, the Imam replied with a confused look what would be the purpose of the "Arab Alliance" and to please explain the meaning of the phrase "Arab World", which he was unfamiliar with.

== Public relationship with Iraqis ==
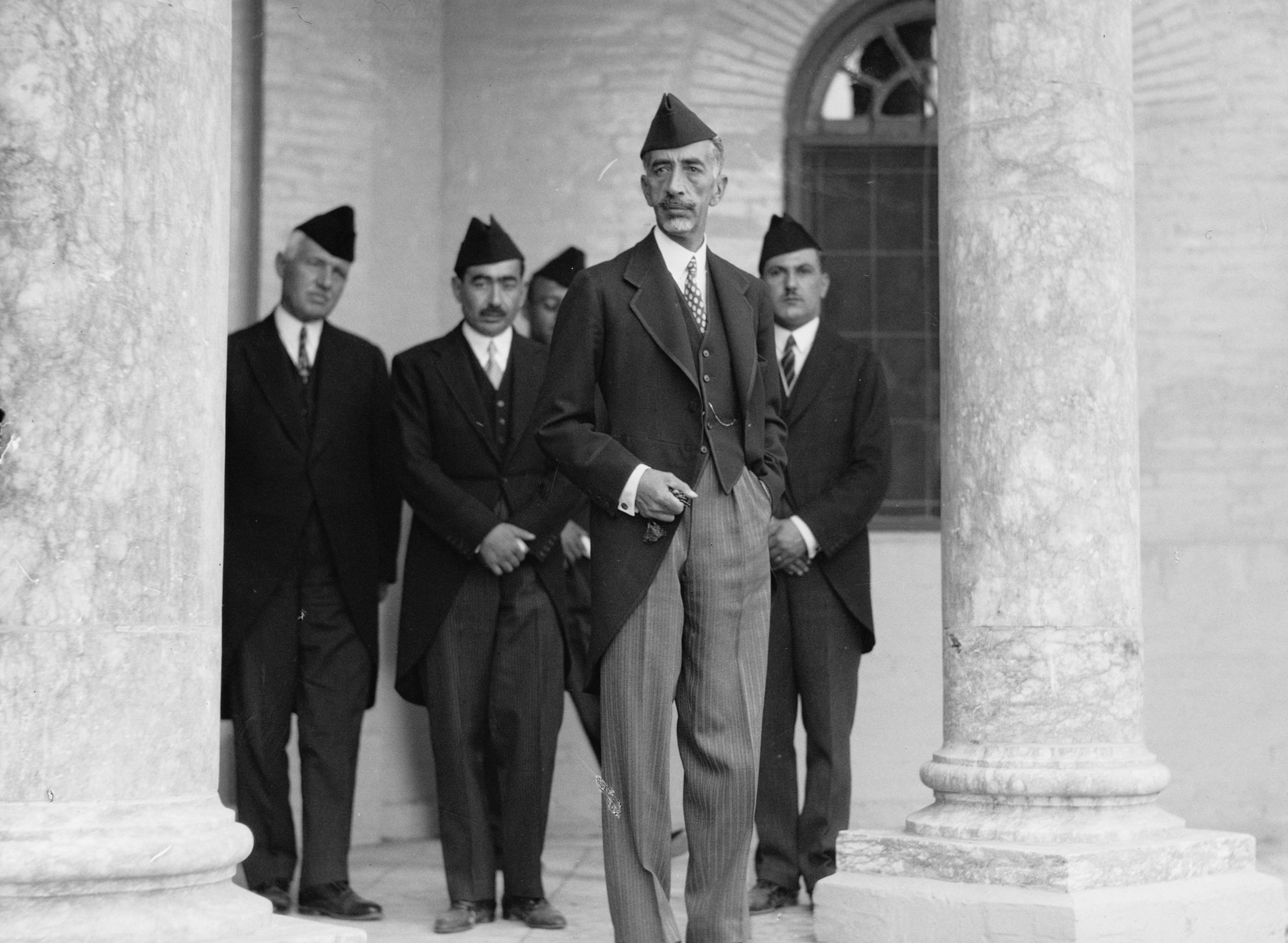
King Faisal I wearing the Sidara in 1932

When Faisal first came to Iraq, he was a stranger to the cultural and social life. Due to this, throughout his reign, he tried his best to immerse himself in understanding the ways of his new country. A few weeks after he arrived in Iraq, he was greeted by the respected Islamic scholar Mahmud Shukri al-Alusi, and met with several educated Iraqis to learn of their perspectives and conditions. Even becoming a patron in several clubs such as the 1920s Baghdadi "Irshad Club." Faisal started a tradition of receiving several writers and poets regularly.

Among these poets was Ma'ruf al-Rusafi, who wrote poems praising the King. Another poet that Faisal received and made a part of his royal court was al-Jawahiri, who was made a member after Arab Nationalist Sati' al-Husri falsely accused him of being an Iranian.

Another group that Faisal held greatly were teachers as he saw them as important figures to encourage and cultivate. Accompanied by Rustam Haidar, he regularly toured Baghdadi schools, including Christian and Jewish, and inspected their conditions as part of his agenda. He met with several teachers, both male and female, to motivate them to work as he considered teachers to be more significant than a king's or minister's work.

However, the poets had also caused Faisal trouble in the matter of education. An example was when Faisal opened the first girls' school in Najaf and received backlash from the conservative groups in the traditionalist city. In response during the opening occasions, al-Jawahiri, who was a Najafi himself, wrote scathing lines criticizing the conservative nature of the city's people in his poem named "The Reactionaries" which was published in several newspapers. This would cause a large outcry in the city which reached Faisal's attention. Faisal would confront al-Jawahiri reportedly saying "Are you aware of the calls and cables I have received that all say that this is the work of your "son, Muhammad," who works under your auspices and protections? And do you know how much grief this has caused me?" In response, al-Jawahiri apologized and offered to resign, but Faisal decided to forgive al-Jawahiri and decided to keep him in his royal court.

=== Relations with religious groups ===
Faisal regularly attended Friday prayers as it helped him meet with the public Iraqi people more. Faisal was noticeably unaffected by sectarian considerations, and was noted by al-Rihani to have a faith that reflected all Islamic dominations, which made him respect, and be tolerant to all world religions. Abbas Baghdadi, a young writer, recounted how Faisal would pull up in the Arab attire to the al-Sarai Mosque for Friday Prayers, which was decided to be the main Friday Prayers mosque. Faisal has also ordered the reconstruction of Sufi shrines in Mosul such as the tekke of the Shadhili Order. Faisal also met with leaders of smaller religious communities such as chief Rabbis from both Baghdad and Mosul.

Faisal had great tolerance for Shi'i Muslims and was a proponent of inter-faith. Faisal's main link with the community was the Sayyid Muhammad al-Sadr, who was one of the only people who could enter the king's presence without further notice. Faisal always wanted to remind Shi'i Muslims of his lineage to Ali. Due to this, his coronation took place on 18 Dhu'l-Hijja according to the Islamic Calendar, which coincided with Eid al-Ghadir.

Throughout his reign, especially in his early days, Faisal wanted to increase the presence of Shi'i Muslims in administrations. Examples being the hiring of Tawfiq al-Suwaidi in the Baghdadi Law College, accepting qualifications of Shi'i Muslim-based schools, help fund the commemorating of Muharram, working with Ayatollah Medhi al-Khalissi who was a friend of Sharif Hussein, and visiting Najaf and Karbala to strengthen his position. Reportedly, Faisal once told Sir Percy Cox that the Iraqi Shi'i Muslims Mujtahideen were prepared to back him up.

In March 1932, just months before independence, Faisal wrote a memorandum where he criticized the Iraqi people's lack of Iraqi national identity in the newly established country, writing:

Iraq is a kingdom ruled by a Sunni Arab government founded on the wreckage of Ottoman rule. This government rules over a Kurdish segment, the majority of which is ignorant, that includes persons with personal ambitions who lead it to abandon it [the government] under the pretext that it does not belong to their ethnicity. [The government also rules over] an ignorant Shiite majority that belongs to the same ethnicity of the government, but the persecutions that had befallen them as a result of Turkish rule, which did not enable them to take part in governance and exercise it, drove a deep wedge between the Arab people divided into these two sects. Unfortunately, all of this made this majority, or the persons who harbor special aspirations, the religious among them, the seekers of posts without qualification, and those who did not benefit materially from the new rule, to pretend that they are still being persecuted because they are Shiites.

== Foreign relations ==
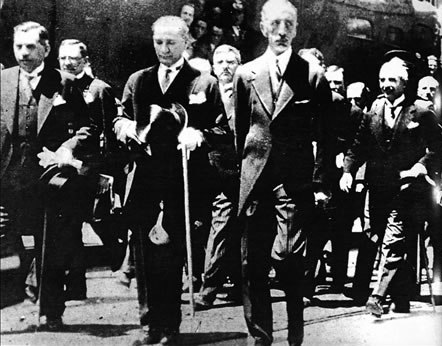
Faisal and Mustafa Kemal during a visit to Turkey

Faisal encouraged an influx of Syrian exiles and office-seekers to cultivate better Iraqi-Syrian relations. In order to improve education in the country Faisal employed doctors and teachers in the civil service and appointed Syrian Arab nationalist Sati' al-Husri, the ex-Minister of Education in Damascus, as his director of the Ministry of Education. This influx resulted in much native resentment towards Syrians and Lebanese in Iraq. The tendency of the Syrian emigres in the education ministry to write and issue school textbooks glorying the Umayyad Caliphate as the "golden age" of the Arabs together with the highly dismissive remarks about Ali gave great offense in the Shi'i Muslim community in Iraq, prompting protests and leading Faisal to withdraw the offending textbooks in 1927 and again in 1933 when they were reissued.

=== Palestinian issue ===
In 1929, when bloody rioting broke out in Jerusalem between the Arab and Jewish communities, Faisal was highly supportive of the Arab position and pressured the British for a pro-Arab solution of the Palestine crisis. In a memo stating his views on Palestine submitted to the British high commissioner Sir Hubert Young on 7 December 1929, Faisal accepted the Balfour Declaration, but only in the most minimal sense in that the declaration had promised a "Jewish national home".

Faisal stated he was willing to accept the Palestine Mandate as a "Jewish national home" to which Jews fleeing persecution around the world might go, but he was adamant that there be no Jewish state. Faisal argued that the best solution was for Britain to grant independence to Palestine, which would be united in a federation led by his brother, the Emir Abdullah of Trans-Jordan, which would allow for a Jewish "national home" under his sovereignty.

Faisal argued that what was needed was a compromise under which the Palestinians would give up their opposition to Jewish immigration to Palestine in exchange for which the Zionists would give up their plans to one day create a Jewish state in the Holy Land. Faisal's preferred solution to the "Palestine Question", which he admitted might not be practical at the moment, was for a federation that would unite Iraq, Syria, Lebanon and Palestine under his leadership.

== Independence and last years ==
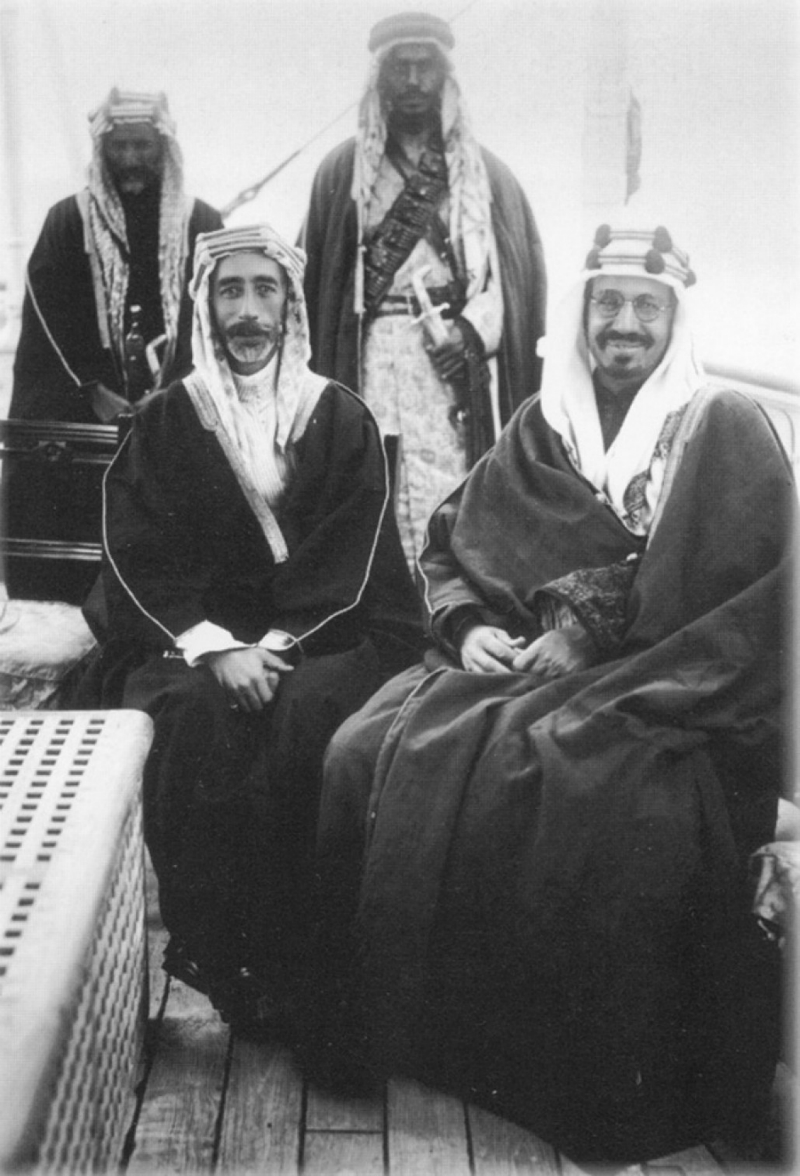
King Faisal I of Iraq and King Abdul-Aziz of Saudi Arabia

In 1932, the British mandate ended and Faisal was instrumental in making his country independent. On 3 October, the Kingdom of Iraq joined the League of Nations.

In August 1933, incidents like the Simele massacre caused tension between the United Kingdom and Iraq. Prime Minister Ramsay MacDonald ordered High Commissioner Francis Humphrys to Iraq immediately upon hearing of the killing of Assyrian Christians. The British government demanded that Faisal stay in Baghdad to punish the guilty, whether Christian or Muslim.

In response, Faisal cabled to the Iraqi Legation in London: "Although everything is normal now in Iraq, and in spite of my broken health, I shall await the arrival of Sir Francis Humphrys in Bagdad, but there is no reason for further anxiety. Inform the British Government of the contents of my telegram."

In July 1933, right before his death, Faisal went to London where he expressed his alarm at the current situation of Arabs that resulted from the Arab-Jewish conflict and the increased Jewish immigration to Palestine, as the Arab political, social, and economic situation was declining. He asked the British to limit Jewish immigration and land purchases.

== Death ==
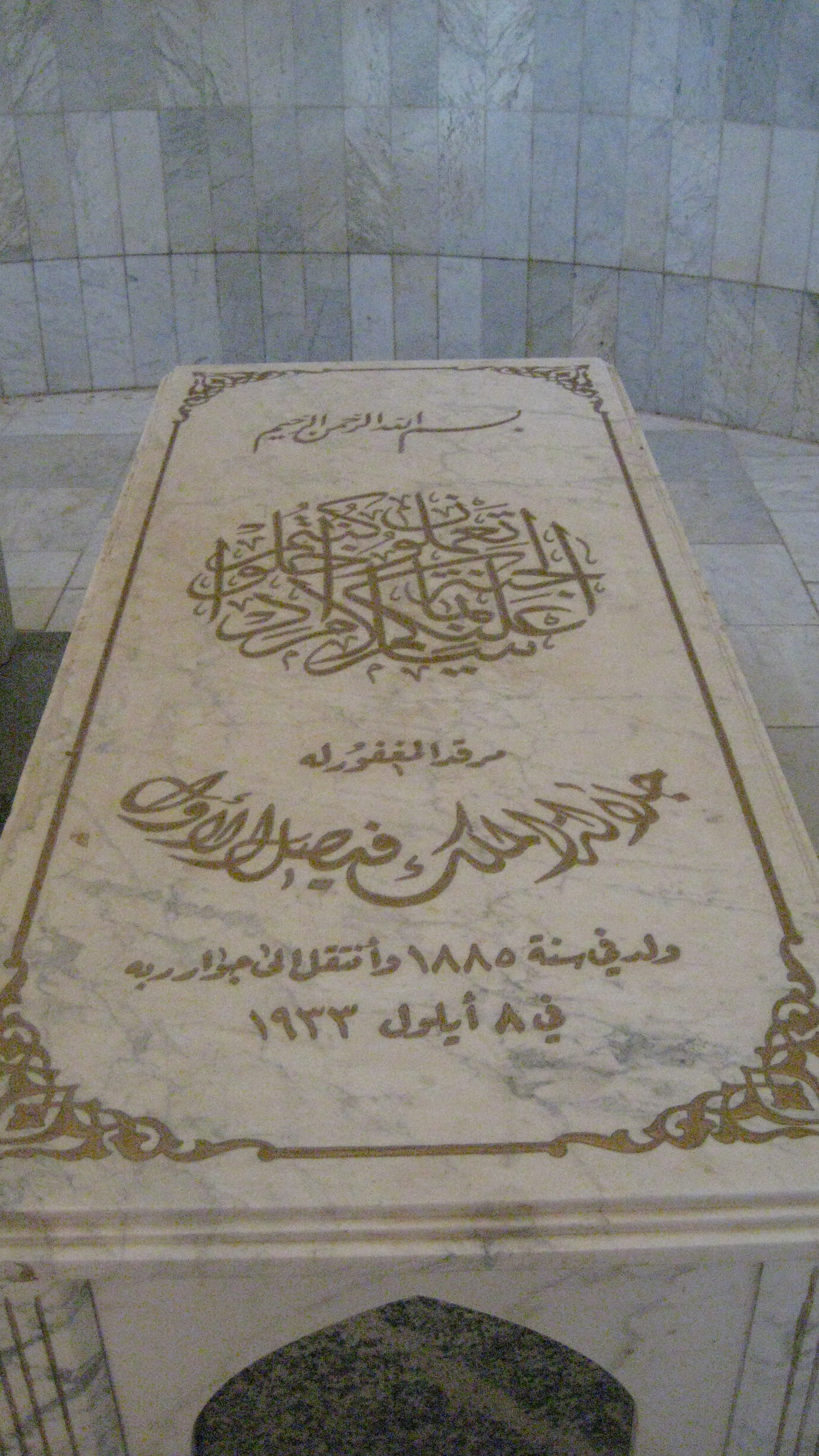
King Faisal's tomb in Baghdad

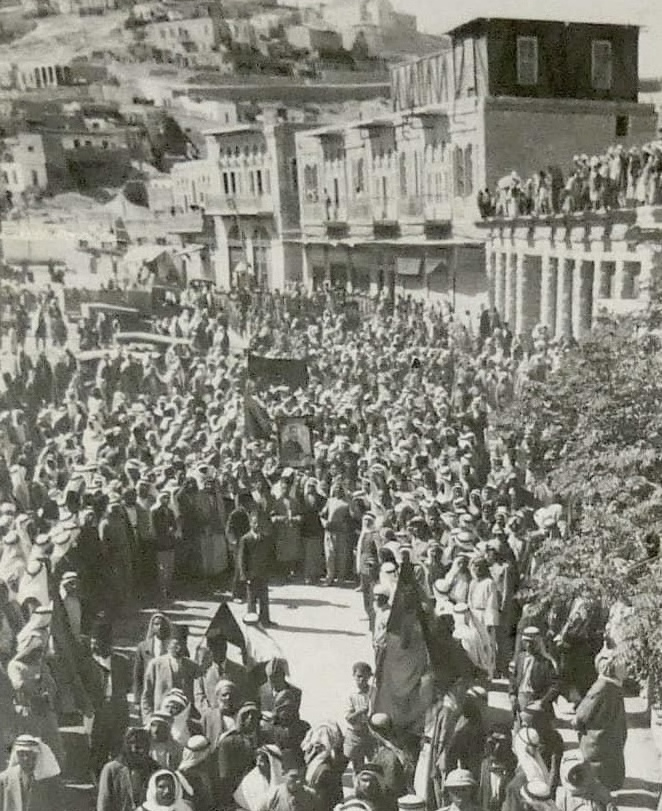
A crowd mourning King Faisal gather in front of the municipality street in Amman, Transjordan in 1933

King Faisal died of a heart attack on 8 September 1933 in Bern, Switzerland. He was 48 years old at the time of his death. Faisal was succeeded on the throne by his eldest son, Ghazi. The credibility of this narrative has been questioned, such as the fact that he exhibited symptoms of arsenic poisoning according to an accompanying British nurse. Historians state that an Indian woman was with the King in his hotel, and a quarrel broke out between them the day before his death, and her whereabouts were unknown immediately after the announcement of his death.

A square is named in his honor at the end of Haifa Street, Baghdad, where an equestrian statue of him stands. The statue was knocked down following the overthrow of the monarchy in 1958, but later restored. Another square is named after him in Haifa, Israel, where his remains passed on their way from the Port of Haifa to the airport, to be flown to Baghdad. A broken column on Faisal Square commemorates his early death.

== Marriage and children ==
Faisal was married to Sharifa Huzaima bint Nasser and had with her one son and three daughters.

- Princess Azza bint Faisal.
- Princess Rajiha bint Faisal.
- Princess Rafia bint Faisal, born 1910 and died unmarried 11 February 1934.
- Ghazi, King of Iraq, born 1912 died 4 April 1939, married his first cousin, Princess Aliya bint Ali, daughter of King Ali of Hejaz.

== Film ==
Faisal has been portrayed on film at least three times:

- In David Lean's epic Lawrence of Arabia, 1962, played by Alec Guinness.
- In the unofficial sequel to Lawrence, A Dangerous Man: Lawrence After Arabia, 1990, played by Alexander Siddig.
- In Werner Herzog's Queen of the Desert, 2015, played by Younes Bouab.
- On video, he was portrayed in The Adventures of Young Indiana Jones: Chapter 19 The Winds of Change, 1995, by Anthony Zaki.

== Ancestry ==
Hashemites

Hashim (eponymous ancestor)
Abd al-Muttalib
Abu Talib	Abdallah
Muhammad (Islamic prophet)
Ali (fourth caliph)	Fatimah
Hasan (fifth caliph)
Hasan Al-Mu'thanna
Abdullah
Musa Al-Djawn
Abdullah
Musa
Muhammad
Abdullah
Ali
Suleiman
Hussein
Issa
Abd Al-Karim
Muta'in
Idris
Qatada (Sharif of Mecca)
Ali
Hassan (Sharif of Mecca)
Abu Numayy I (Sharif of Mecca)
Rumaythah (Sharif of Mecca)
Ajlan (Sharif of Mecca)
Hassan (Sharif of Mecca)
Barakat I (Sharif of Mecca)
Muhammad (Sharif of Mecca)
Barakat II (Sharif of Mecca)
Abu Numayy II (Sharif of Mecca)
Hassan (Sharif of Mecca)
Abdullah (Sharif of Mecca)
Hussein
Abdullah
Muhsin
Auon, Ra'i Al-Hadala
Abdul Mu'een
Muhammad (Sharif of Mecca)
Ali
Hussein (Sharif of Mecca King of Hejaz)
Ali (King of Hejaz)	Abdullah I (King of Jordan)	Faisal I (King of Syria King of Iraq)	Zeid (pretender to Iraq)
'Abd Al-Ilah (Regent of Iraq)	Talal (King of Jordan)	Ghazi (King of Iraq)	Ra'ad (pretender to Iraq)
Hussein (King of Jordan)	Faisal II (King of Iraq)	Zeid
Abdullah II (King of Jordan)
Hussein (Crown Prince of Jordan)

== See also ==
- Faisal–Weizmann Agreement
- List of Syrian monarchs
- Timeline of Syrian history
- Battle of Maysalun
- Ali of Hejaz
- Abdullah I of Jordan
- Ghazi of Iraq
- Hussein of Hejaz

Faisal I House of Hāshim Born: 20 May 1885 Died: September 8 1933
Regnal titles
New creation Arab revolt	King of Syria; 8 March 1920 – 24 July 1920	Kingdom abolished French mandate established (Subhi Barakat as President of Syria)
New creation Cairo Conference	King of Iraq; 23 August 1921 – 8 September 1933	Succeeded by Ġāzī I
Titles in pretence
New creation Kingdom abolished French mandate established	— TITULAR — King of Syria; 24 July 1920 – 8 September 1933; Reason for succession failure: Kingdom abolished in 1920	Succeeded by Ġāzī I
