= Scottish Theatre Forum =

The Scottish Theatre Forum is a blog dedicated to the performing arts in Scotland and designed for use by anyone interested in amateur or professional theatre in the country. It was founded in February 2006 and is owned by Mark Grieve. The blog has not been active since 2007.

== Charity work ==
The forum and its members have been involved in charity work, including organizing a production of We Will Rock You in 2007 to raise money for Edinburgh's Royal Hospital for Sick Children, and helping with the fundraising appeal for Dunfermline's Alhambra Theatre.
