= Princess Rajiha of Iraq =

Iraqi princess

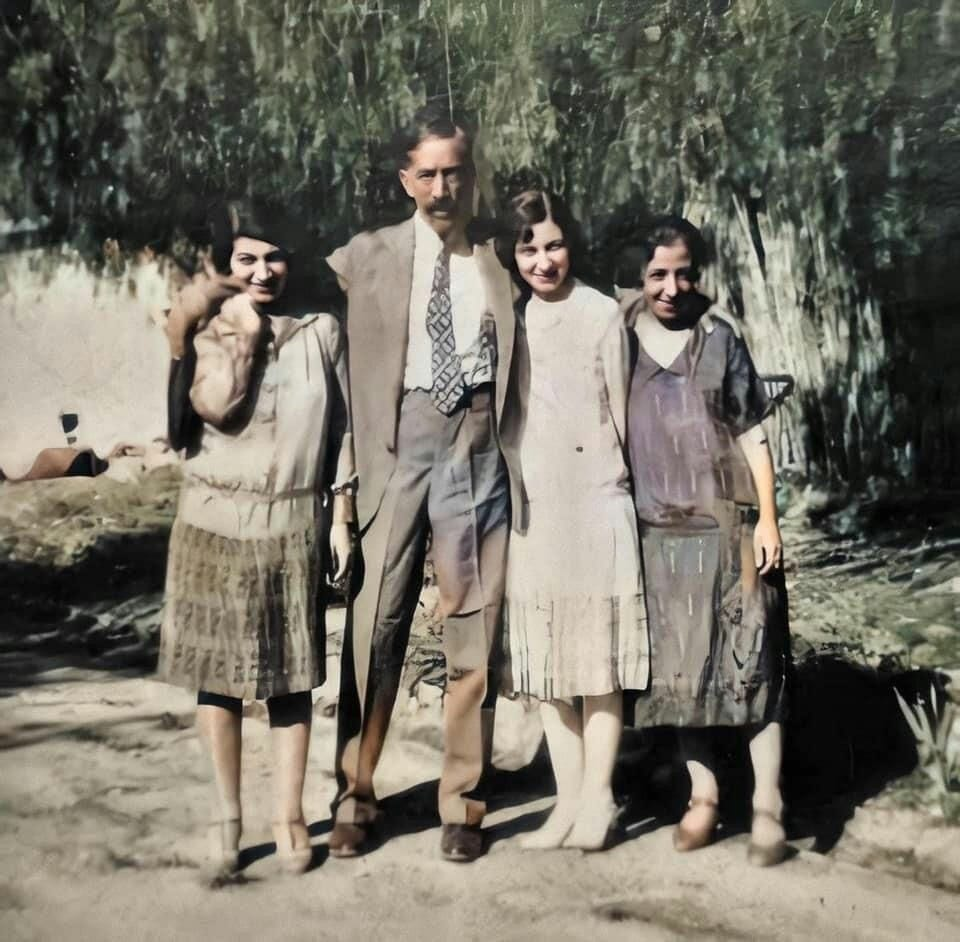
- Princess Rajiha with her father and sisters Azza and Rafia
- Born: 1907; Constantinople, Ottoman Empire
- Died: 1 February 1959 (aged 51–52); Lausanne, Switzerland
- Burial: Raghadan Palace
- Spouse: Abd al-Jabbar Mahmud Altai (m. 1937)
- Father: King Faisal I
- Mother: Queen Huzaima

Princess Rajiha of Iraq (1907–1959) was an Iraqi princess. She was the daughter of king Faisal I of Iraq and queen Huzaima bint Nasser, and the sister of king Ghazi of Iraq.

== Life ==
She spend her childhood in Mecca. In 1920, her father Faisal was proclaimed king of Syria, and his spouse and children moved into the new established royal palace in Damascus. After only four months of reign, the kingdom of Syria was dissolved after the Franco-Syrian War. In 1921, the British government decided to put Faisal as king of the new Kingdom of Iraq, over which they had an international mandate. He accepted and he was proclaimed king of Iraq. The royal family was transferred to Baghdad the capital of the new kingdom.

After the arrival of the queen and her daughters in Bagdad in 1924, Gertrude Bell was the first to be given an audience. Bell had been entrusted by the King to manage the affairs of his family's household. Bell arranged for the Circassian Madame Jaudet Beg to be named lady-in-waiting or mistress of ceremonies to the queen, and for Miss Fairley, the English governess to the crown prince, to instruct the princesses in European etiquette. Gertrude Bell described the queen and her daughters as beautiful, sensitive and shy.

King Faisal did not feel it be politically wise for the queen and princesses to participate in public life in the Western manner. Queen Huzaima and her daughters lived secluded in purdah in the Harthiya villa and did not appear in public or in any mixed-gender company. While the King entertained male guests at the Palace, the queen and her daughters received women guests in the Harthiya villa and visited all-female partiers. They appeared veiled in public, but under their veils they dressed in Western fashion ordered from London, only shown at the women-only parties.

She married at Qasr al-Rihab, Harithiya, Baghdad, in 1937, Abd al-Jabbar Mahmud Altai, sometime Flight Lieutenant of the Royal Iraqi Air Force (RIrAF).

She was undergoing treatment for cancer in Switzerland and the United States at the time of the 14 July Revolution. She died of cancer in Lausanne in Switzerland.
