= Huzaima bint Nasser =

Arabian princess (1884–1935)

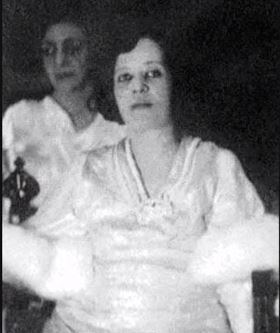
- Huzaima at the wedding of her son Ghazi, 1934

Queen consort of Iraq
- Tenure: 23 August 1921 – 8 September 1933

Queen consort of Syria
- Tenure: 8 March 1920 – 24 July 1920
- Born: 1884; Mecca, Ottoman Empire (now Saudi Arabia)
- Died: 27 March 1935 (aged 50–51); Baghdad, Iraq
- Burial: Royal Mausoleum, Adhamiyah, Baghdad
- Spouse: Faisal I of Iraq (m. 1904; died 1933)
- Issue: Princess Azza of Iraq; Princess Rajiha of Iraq; Princess Rafia of Iraq; King Ghazi I of Iraq
- House: Hashemite
- Father: Amir Nasser Pasha
- Mother: Dilber Khanum
- Religion: Sunni Islam

Huzaima bint Nasser (Arabic: حزيمة بنت ناصر; "firm believer"; 1884 – 27 March 1935) was an Arabian noblewoman, Sharifa of Mecca. She was Queen of Syria and then Queen of Iraq by marriage to Faisal I of Iraq, and queen mother during the reign of her son.

== Biography ==
Her father was Amir Nasser Pasha. Her mother was Dilber Khanum. She was the younger twin of Musbah.

In 1904, in Istanbul, she married the prince Faisal, son of the Sharif of Mecca Hussein bin Ali. Their first born was Azza (1906–1960), followed by Rajiha (1907–1959) and Rafia (1910–1934), and finally by Ghazi (1912–1939), the future King of Iraq.

=== Queen of Syria ===
After World War I, the former dominions of the Ottoman Empire were divided between the European nations or proclaimed independent.

In 1920, Faisal was proclaimed King of Syria, and so Hazima became Queen of Syria. In order to reach her husband, she moved with her children into the newly established royal palace in Damascus.

After only four months of reign, the Kingdom of Syria was dissolved after the Franco-Syrian War, and so both Faisal and Hazima lost their titles.

=== Queen of Iraq ===
In 1921, the British government decided to put Faisal as king of the new Kingdom of Iraq, over which they had an international mandate. He accepted, and he was proclaimed King of Iraq. Hazima became Queen of Iraq, and the royal family was transferred to Baghdad, the capital of the new kingdom.

After the arrival of the Queen in Bagdad in 1924, Gertrude Bell was the first to be given an audience. Bell had been entrusted by the King to manage the affairs of his family's household, and arranged for the Circassian Madame Jaudet Beg to be named lady-in-waiting or mistress of ceremonies to the queen, and the for Miss Fairley, the English governess to the crown prince, to instruct the princesses in European etiquette.

Gertrude Bell had a good first impression by the Queen and described both her and her daughters as beautiful, sensitive, and shy. However, the queen was not pleased with the influence the King had granted Gertrude Bell within the household. She disliked the arrangements Bell made for the education of the crown prince, and in 1925, she banished Maryam Safwat from the palace because she suspected Bell for attempting to arrange a marriage between Safwat and the King.

King Faisal did not feel it be politically wise for the Queen and Princesses to participate in public life in the Western manner. Queen Huzaima and her daughters lived secluded in purdah in the Harthiya villa and did not appear in public or in any mixed-gender company. While the King entertained male guests at the Qasr Shashoua Palace, the queen and her daughters received women guests in the Harthiya villa and visited all-female partiers. They dressed covered in veils in public, but under their veil, they eventually dressed in Western fashion ordered from London, only shown at the women-only parties.

She showed an interest in the Iraqi women's movement. In 1924, she and the King gave an audience to the first women's organisation in Iraq, the Women's Awakening Club, to whom they showed patronage. In 1932, queen Huzaima attended the Third Eastern Women's Congress, which was held in Baghdad, and gave the welcome opening speech.

King Faisal I died in 1933, and was succeeded by his son, King Ghazi, and so Huzaima became queen mother of Iraq.

She died in Baghdad two years later, in 1935.

== Issue ==
By her marriage, she had three daughters and a son:

- Princess Azza bint Faisal.
- Princess Rajiha bint Faisal.
- Princess Rafia bint Faisal, born 1910 and died unmarried 11 February 1934.
- Ghazi, King of Iraq, born 1912 and died 4 April 1939, married his first cousin, Princess Aliya bint Ali, daughter of King Ali of Hejaz.

== See also ==
- List of Syrian monarchs
- Timeline of Syrian history

Huzaima bint Nasser House of Nasser Born: 1884 1935
Regnal titles
New title	Queen of Syria; 1920	Kingdom abolished
New title	Queen of Iraq; 1921–1933	Succeeded by Aliya bint Ali
