= Princess Azza of Iraq =

Iraqi princess

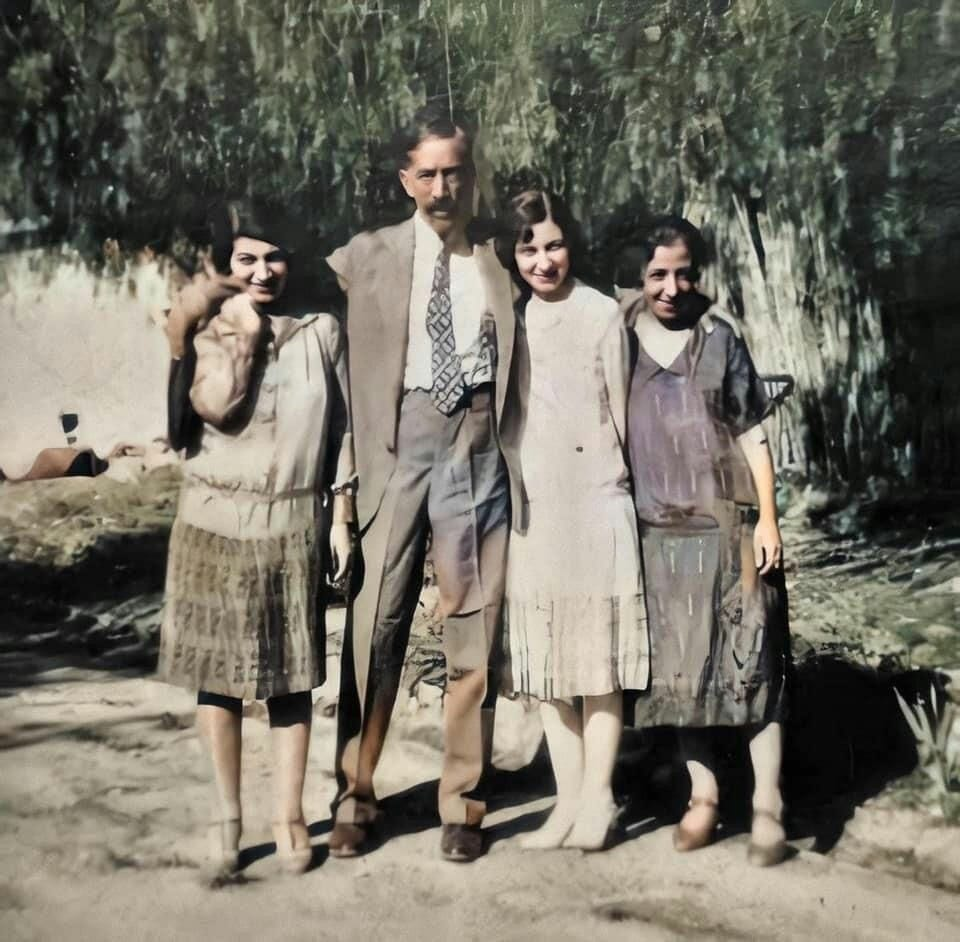
- Princess Azza with her father and sisters Rajiha and Rafia
- Born: 1905; Constantinople, Ottoman Empire
- Died: 1960 (aged 54–55)
- Burial: Raghadan Palace
- Spouse: Anastassios Haralambides (m. 1936; div. 1943)
- Father: King Faisal I
- Mother: Queen Huzaima

Princess Azza of Iraq (1905–1960) was an Iraqi princess. She was the daughter of King Faisal I of Iraq and Queen Huzaima bint Nasser, and the sister of king Ghazi of Iraq.

== Life ==
She spend her childhood in Mecca. In 1920, her father Faisal was proclaimed king of Syria, and his spouse and children moved into the new established royal palace in Damascus. After only four months of reign, the kingdom of Syria was dissolved after the Franco-Syrian War. In 1921, the British government decided to put Faisal as king of the new Kingdom of Iraq, over which they had an international mandate. He accepted and he was proclaimed king of Iraq. The royal family was transferred to Baghdad the capital of the new kingdom.

After the arrival of the queen and her daughters in Bagdad in 1924, Gertrude Bell was the first to be given an audience. Bell had been entrusted by the King to manage the affairs of his family's household. Bell arranged for the Circassian Madame Jaudet Beg to be named lady-in-waiting or mistress of ceremonies to the queen, and for Miss Fairley, the English governess to the crown prince, to instruct the princesses in European etiquette. Gertrude Bell described the queen and her daughters as beautiful, sensitive and shy.

King Faisal did not feel it be politically wise for the queen and princesses to participate in public life in the Western manner. Queen Huzaima and her daughters lived secluded in purdah in the Harthiya villa and did not appear in public or in any mixed-gender company. While the King entertained male guests at the Palace, the queen and her daughters received women guests in the Harthiya villa and visited all-female partiers. They appeared veiled in public, but under their veils they dressed in Western fashion ordered from London, only shown at the women-only parties.

In 1936, Princess Azza visited Greece with her brother. During the trip, she became acquainted with a Greek member of staff at a hotel. After her return to Iraq, she was given permission to return to Greece for health reasons in the company of her sister Princess Rajiha. During the visit she eloped with the Greek man she had met during her previous visit. She informed Princess Rajiha that she was now married and had converted to Orthodox Christianity under the name Anastasia. She was granted Italian citizenship through her marriage, since her Greek husband was a Greek citizen. She lived with her husband in Rhodes, Cyprus and London. She had no children. In 1939, she separated from her husband and settled in Italy, where she was granted an allowance from the Italian government. In 1943, she divorced from her husband in Rome. After the Second World War, her allowance from the Italian Government stopped. At this point, she was suffering from bad health. When her cousin Prince Abd al-Ilah visited Rome in 1945, she reconciled with her family and settled in Jerusalem. She died of cancer in London.
