= Alhambra, Missouri =

Extinct town in the American state of Missouri

Coordinates: 36°55′46″N 90°0′2″W

Alhambra is an extinct town in Stoddard County, in the U.S. state of Missouri.

A post office called Alhambra was established in 1902, and remained in operation until 1909. The community took its name from Alhambra fortress in Spain.
