= Al-Hamra, al-Suqaylabiyah =

Al-Hamra الحمراء
- Village
- Location in Syria
- Coordinates: 35.4675°N 36.377778°E
- Country: Syria
- Governorate: Hama
- District: Suqaylabiyah
- Subdistrict: Qalaat al-Madiq

Population (2004)
  - Total: 932
- Time zone: UTC+3 (AST)
- City Qrya Pcode: N/A

Al-Hamra (Arabic: الحمراء) is a Syrian village located in the Qalaat al-Madiq Subdistrict of the Suqaylabiyah District in Hama Governorate. According to the Syria Central Bureau of Statistics (CBS), al-Hamra had a population of 932 in the 2004 census.
