= Miirrha Alhambra =

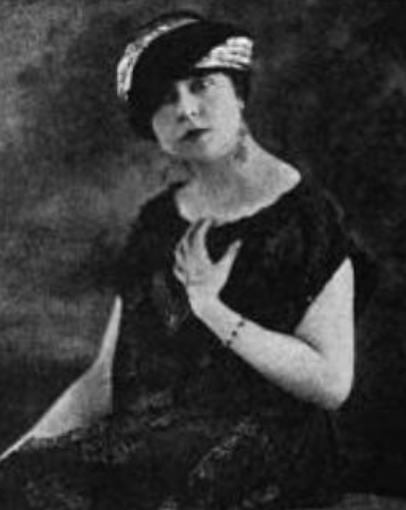
- Alhambra, from a 1923 publication

Background information
- Birth name: Pauline Joutard
- Born: 1890; France
- Died: 1957
- Instrument: piano

Pauline Joutard (1890–1957) was a French-born Mexican pianist who performed under the stage name Miirrha Alhambra.

Her sister Flora Joutard and she had studied in Bad Homburg before touring Europe. and South America together in the early 1900s. A friend took her to Mérida to play where she would meet and marry her husband, Domingo Fernando Evia y Barbachano (1883–1977), a wealthy Mexican landowner who was a member of two families that have been prominent in the politics and culture of Yucatán since the mid 19th century, one of which, the Barbachanos, has been described as "one of the most powerful of Yucatán's oligarchy.

On 30 June 1912, she arrived with her husband and two-year-old son Edgar de Evia in New York City aboard the liner "Progreso".
