= Cervezas Alhambra =

Brewery in Granada, Spain

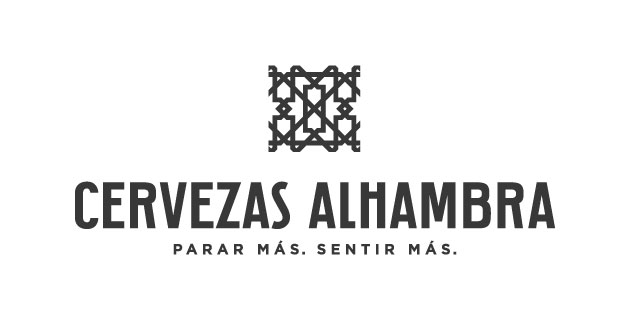

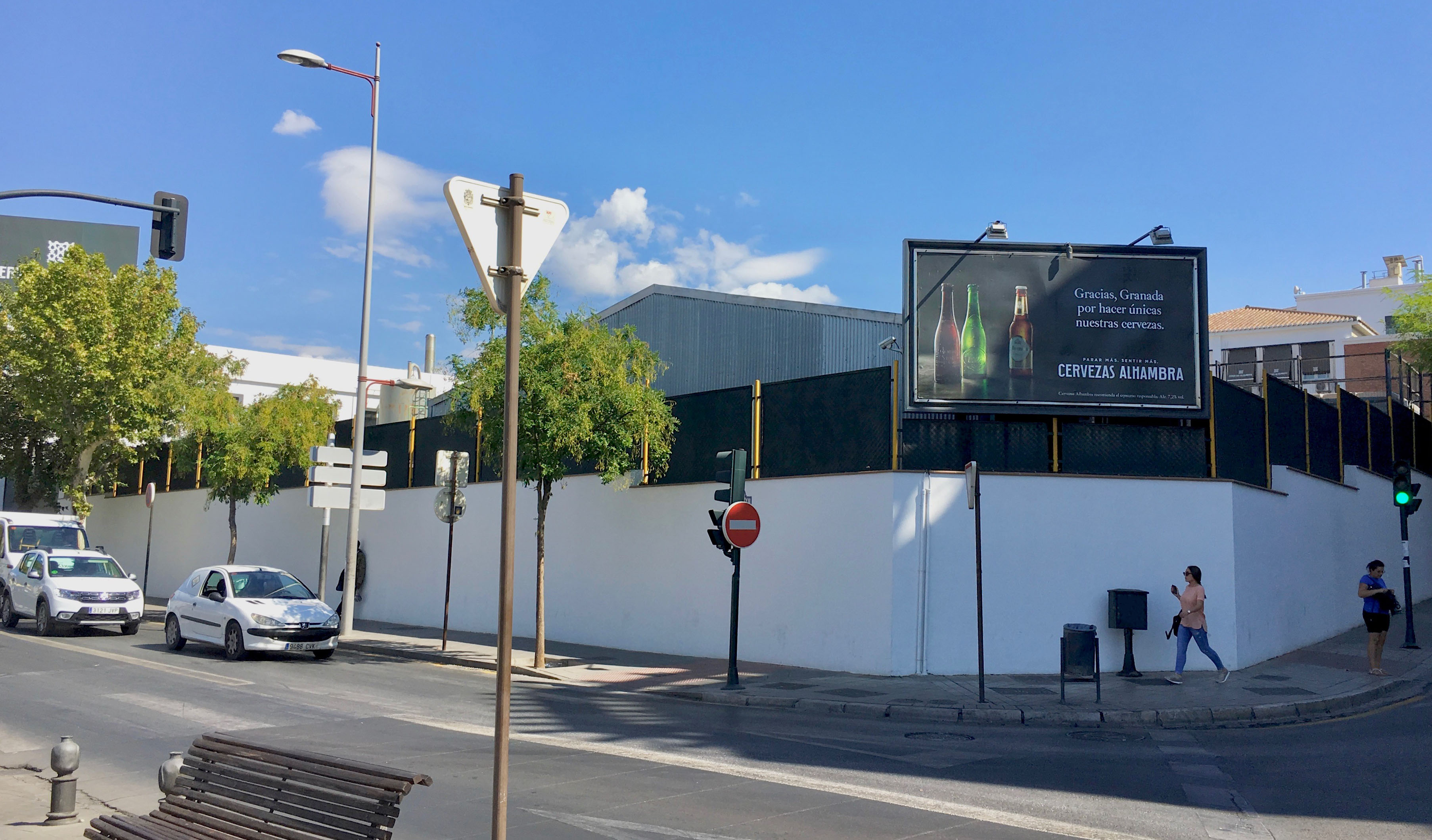
- Type: Beer
- Manufacturer: Mahou-San Miguel
- Origin: Granada, Spain
- Introduced: 1925
- Alcohol by volume: 4.6% - 6.4%
- Colour: Golden
- Related products: Reserva 1925, Alhambra Especial, Alhambra Premium Lager, Alhambra Negra, Mezquita, Alhambra Sin
- Website: cervezasalhambra.com

Cervezas Alhambra is a brand of pale lager owned and produced by Mahou-San Miguel since 2007. The portfolio contains products such as Alhambra Reserve 1925, launched in 1997.

== History ==
Alhambra Beers was founded in 1925 with capital from Granada and with the participation of Joseph Gurney, owner of La Moravia factory. The brand owes part of its evolution to the chemist D. Thompson, who created Alhambra Reserva 1925 when the brand was going through a difficult period, along with other creations that followed. Despite the setbacks of the time in the midst of the Spanish Civil War, since 1936 Alhambra began growing and didn’t stop its production.

In 1954 it entered the shareholding of the Spanish company Damm and in 1979 Cruzcampo also became a part of the group. In the following decades, the company experienced years of growth and industrial modernization of its facilities.

In 1995 the company accumulated debts amounting to 600 million pesetas, which led it to renegotiate its debts with its creditors. In 1995 Cruzcampo and Damm abandoned the shareholding and Alhambra sold 99% of its shares to an external group at a low price. In 1996 the company began to turn a profit. In 1998 the company made a profit of 300 million pesetas and in 1999 it bought the Andalusian Beer Company, producer of the Cordoba brand, Sureña, which was part of the Colombian group Bavaria.

In 2001 Heineken Group (owner of Cruzcampo and El Aguila) sued Alhambra to keep them from producing Águila Negra. The suit was accompanied by a report from a detective that informed of the production of Águila Negra by Alhambra. However, Águila Negra originated in Asturias in 1901 and was bought by Alhambra in 1997, therefore in 2002 the Court of Granada granted permission to the company to brew the beer.

In 2001 Alhambra sued Heineken for industrial espionage. Although the judge imputed two of the heads of Heineken, finally the suit was thrown out because the hired detective for Heineken only wanted to know if Alhambra was producing Aguila Negra.

In 2006 Alhambra was bought by Mahou- San Miguel. The cost of this operation was 200 million euros. The company focused its sales on the region of Eastern Andalucia, although in the beginning of the decade of the 2000s it began to spread its brand to the Spanish region of Levante and Madrid.

== Complete list of company beers ==
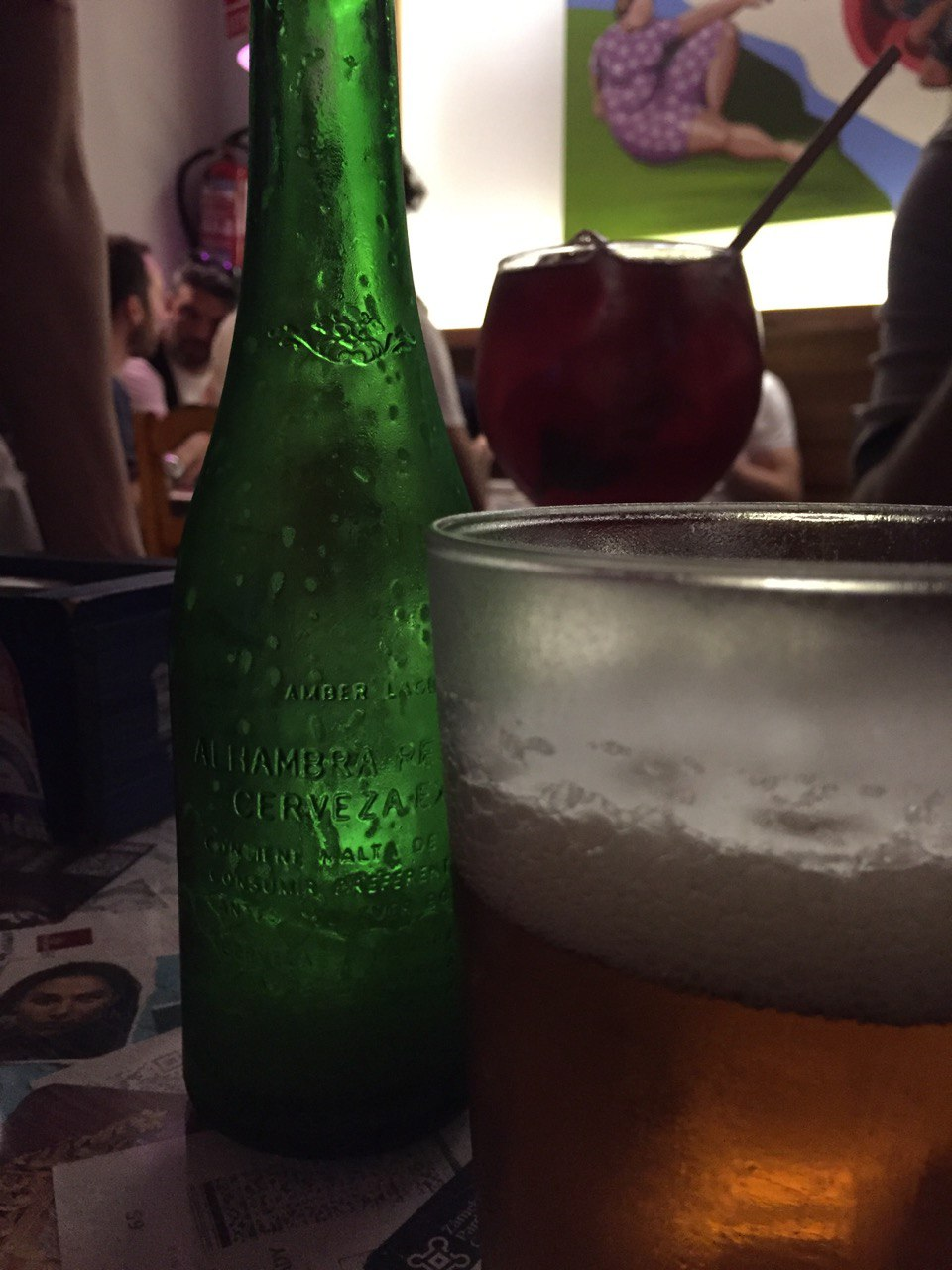
Alhambra beer bottle and glass

- Alhambra Especial
- Alhambra Premium Lager
- Alhambra Sin
- Alhambra Negra
- Alhambra Reserva 1925
- Alhambra Reserva Cerveza Roja
- Mezquita
- Sureña (antes propiedad de la Compañía Andaluza de Cervezas)
- Adlerbrau
- El Águila Negra.11
- Agua mineral natural Sierras de Jaén
