= Alhambra High School =

Alhambra High School may refer to:

- Alhambra High School (Alhambra, California), Alhambra, California
- Alhambra High School (Martinez, California), Martinez, California
- Alhambra High School (Arizona), Phoenix, Arizona
