= Alhambra Theatre, Manchester =

Coordinates: 53°28′23″N 2°09′52″W

Alhambra Theatre
- Interactive map of Alhambra Theatre
- Address: Ashton Old Road, Higher Openshaw; Manchester; United Kingdom

Construction
- Opened: 1910
- Demolished: 2009
- Architect: H. A. Turner

The Alhambra Theatre in Higher Openshaw, Manchester, England, was opened in 1910, part of the H. D. Moorhouse Theatre Circuit, but it had been converted to a cinema by the outbreak of the First World War in 1914. The cinema was converted into a bingo hall in the early 1960s. The auditorium was finally used as a sporting club, and what remained of the building was used as a restaurant, storage space and glass works. The Alhambra was demolished in 2009 to make way for a new Morrisons supermarket.
