= Al Hamra', Al Madinah =

Al Hamra'
- Village
- Location in Saudi Arabia
- Coordinates: 23°56′12″N 38°52′28″E
- Country: Saudi Arabia
- Province: Al Madinah Province
- Time zone: UTC+3 (EAT)
  - Summer (DST): UTC+3 (EAT)

Al Hamra' is a village in Al Madinah Province, in western Saudi Arabia.

== See also ==
- List of cities and towns in Saudi Arabia
- Regions of Saudi Arabia
