= Alhambra Theatre, Dunfermline =

Theatre in Dunfermline, Scotland

- Interactive map of Alhambra Theatre, Dunfermline
- Address: 33-35 Canmore St, Dunfermline KY12 7NX
- Coordinates: 56.069857209045075°N 3.457697074095651°W
- Seating type: Reserved seating
- Type: Concert Hall

Construction
- Built: 1922

Website
- www.alhambradunfermline.com

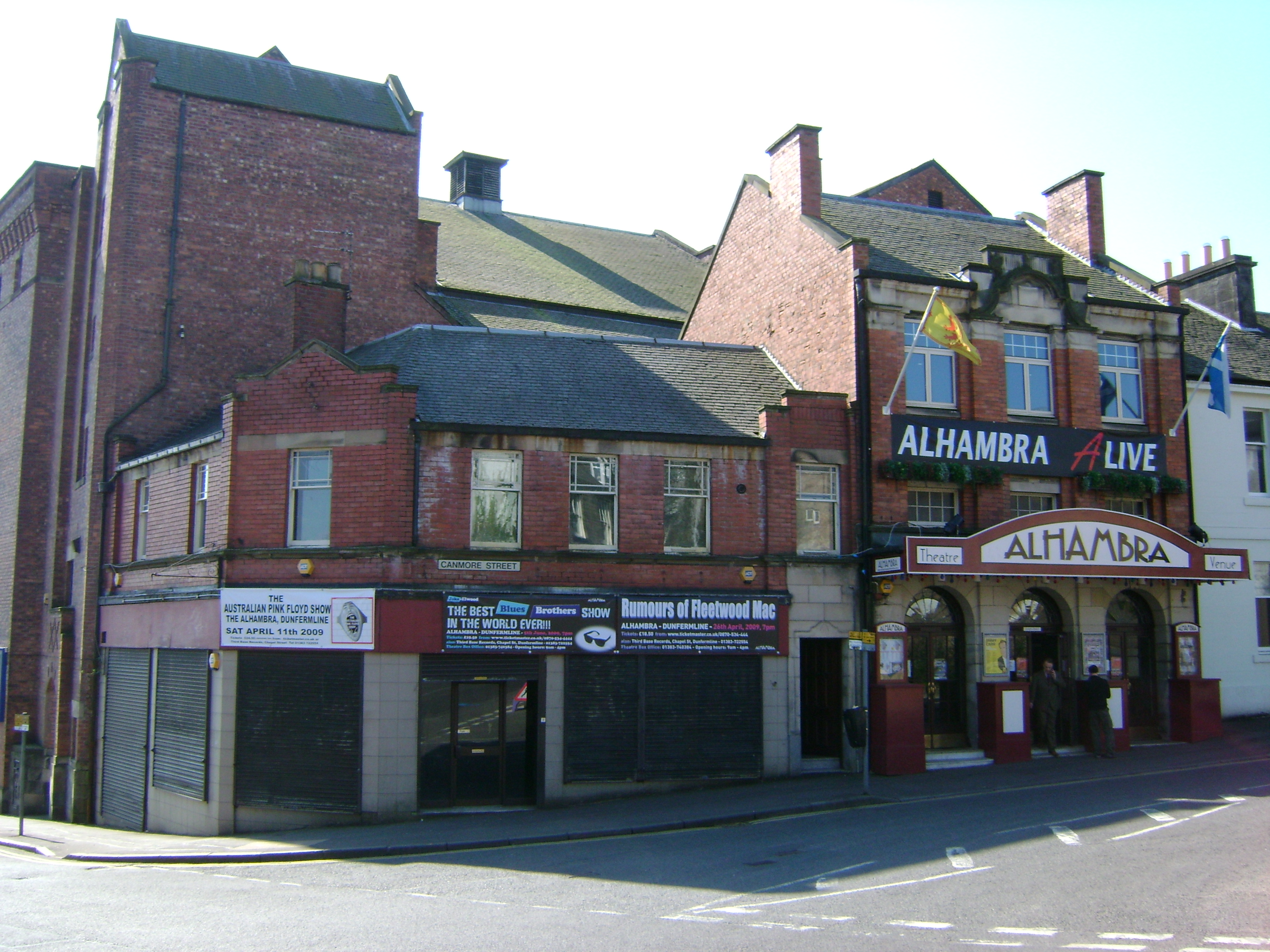
Alhambra Theatre

The Alhambra Theatre opened in Dunfermline, Scotland, on 14 August 1922. Designed by local architect John Fraser, it was constructed over a two-year period by George Stewart of Blantyre and is located on the corner of Canmore Street and New Row. Built from red brick, on completion it was the largest brick building in Dunfermline.

== History ==
The plans for The Alhambra Theatre were lodged by Scottish and Provincial Theatres Ltd on 27 November 1919 and the land and responsibility were transferred to Alhambra Dunfermline Ltd on 25 October 1921. Before the theatre was completed the funds to pay the various contractors was almost exhausted so to permit completion of the building shares in The Alhambra were issued to the various contractors in lieu of final payment of their bills.

The Alhambra was built to be both a theatre and a cinema, and opened on 22 August 1922 with a screening of Over the Hill.

The theatre was used as a cinema from 1925 to 1965 and a bingo hall from 1965 to 2006. It lay empty in 2007, and was then restored by a private developer, reopening in 2008.

== Relaunch ==
The Alhambra reopened on 7 June 2008. It is now owned by property developers Linklever Ltd.

In March 2016 it was reported that the theatre might close because of financial difficulties

== Notable performances ==
Since the 2008 relaunch the Alhambra has hosted major musicals including Blood Brothers (the first West End touring production to visit Dunfermline for 77 years), The Rocky Horror Show, Grease and Chicago. Many of the top name comedy performers have also performed at the Alhambra: Kevin Bridges, Alan Carr, Dara Ó Briain, Tim Minchin, Bill Bailey and the late Sir Ken Dodd are part of a long list.

The theatre has also hosted a number of ballet and opera companies, the Royal Scottish National Orchestra and the Scottish Fiddle Orchestra.

The Scottish National Theatre has performed The House of Bernarda Alba, The Wicker Man and Dracula. The iconic play The Mousetrap has made two visits to the theatre and The Man In Black has also frightened a few patrons.

There are also regularly a number of children's shows at various times throughout the year.

== Listed Building Status ==
The Alhambra is a grade B listed building primarily due to its largely intact fine interior.
