= 971 =

Calendar year

971 in various calendars
- Gregorian calendar: 971; CMLXXI
- Ab urbe condita: 1724
- Armenian calendar: 420; ԹՎ ՆԻ
- Assyrian calendar: 5721
- Balinese saka calendar: 892–893
- Bengali calendar: 377–378
- Berber calendar: 1921
- Buddhist calendar: 1515
- Burmese calendar: 333
- Byzantine calendar: 6479–6480
- Chinese calendar: 庚午年 (Metal Horse); 3668 or 3461 — to — 辛未年 (Metal Goat); 3669 or 3462
- Coptic calendar: 687–688
- Discordian calendar: 2137
- Ethiopian calendar: 963–964
- Hebrew calendar: 4731–4732
- Hindu calendars
- Vikram Samvat: 1027–1028
- Shaka Samvat: 892–893
- Kali Yuga: 4071–4072
- Holocene calendar: 10971
- Iranian calendar: 349–350
- Islamic calendar: 360–361
- Japanese calendar: Tenroku 2 (天禄２年)
- Javanese calendar: 872–873
- Julian calendar: 971; CMLXXI
- Korean calendar: 3304
- Minguo calendar: 941 before ROC 民前941年
- Nanakshahi calendar: −497
- Seleucid era: 1282/1283 AG
- Thai solar calendar: 1513–1514
- Tibetan calendar: ལྕགས་ཕོ་རྟ་ལོ་ (male Iron-Horse); 1097 or 716 or −56 — to — ལྕགས་མོ་ལུག་ལོ་ (female Iron-Sheep); 1098 or 717 or −55

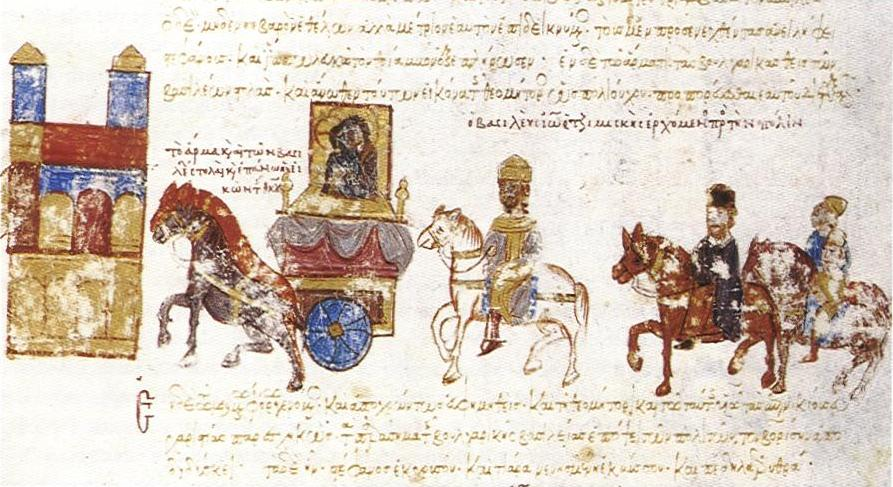
Emperor John I (middle) returns in triumph in Constantinople with the captured Boris II.

Year 971 (CMLXXI) was a common year starting on Sunday of the Julian calendar.

== Events ==
=== By place ===
==== Byzantine Empire ====
- Battle of Dorostolon: A Byzantine expeditionary army (possibly 30–40,000 men) attacks the Bulgarian frontier, personally led by Emperor John I. He lays siege to the fortress city of Dorostolon (located on the Lower Danube), and is reinforced by a fleet of 300 ships equipped with Greek fire. The Kievan Rus' and their Bulgarian allies are reduced to extremities by famine. After a 3-month siege, Grand Prince Sviatoslav I agrees to sign a peace treaty with the Byzantines, whereby he renounces his interests towards Bulgarian lands and the city of Chersonesos in Crimea. Sviatoslav is allowed to evacuate his army to Berezan Island, while the Byzantines enter Dorostolon. John renames the city Theodoropolis (named after the reigning Empress Theodora).
- John I returns in triumph to Constantinople. He brings along Boris II, ruler (tsar) of the Bulgarian Empire, and his family, together with the contents of the Bulgarian imperial treasury. Boris is given the Byzantine 'court title' of magistros as compensation. The Bulgarian lands in Thrace and Lower Moesia become part of the Byzantine Empire.

==== Europe ====
- Otto I 'the Great', Holy Roman Emperor, appoints his imperial secretary Willigis as chancellor (guardian of the emperor's seal), an office formerly held by Otto's brother, Archbishop Bruno I.

==== Britain ====
- King Cuilén (or Cuilean) is killed by Britons after a 6-year reign. He is succeeded by his nephew Kenneth II, as ruler of Alba (Scotland). He will not be sole king until 977.

==== Middle East ====
- Battle of Alexandretta: The Byzantines defeat a Fatimid force (4,000 men) near Alexandretta (modern Turkey), while the main Fatimid army is besieging the fortress city of Antioch. Coupled with news of an advance against Damascus of the Qarmatians, the Fatimids are forced to lift the siege and withdraw to Egypt.
- First Qarmatian invasion of Egypt: The Qarmatians under al-Hasan al-A'sam invade Syria, recently conquered by the Fatimid Caliphate, capturing Damascus and Ramla, defeating a major Fatimid army and blockading another in Jaffa. A subsequent invasion of Egypt leads to widespread anti-Fatimid revolts in the Nile Delta, but the delay allows the Fatimid general Jawhar to prepare his defences, leading to the decisive Qarmatian at Ayn Shams on 24 December and the collapse of the invasion.

==== Asia ====
- Emperor Aditya Chola II, co-regent of the Chola dynasty (modern India), is murdered and succeeded by Uttama. Due to his immaturity, Arunmozhi Varman becomes the heir apparent.

==== China ====
- January 23 – A war elephant corps of the Southern Han is defeated at Shao, by crossbow fire from Song dynasty troops. The Southern Han Kingdom is forced to submit to the Song dynasty. Ending Southern Han rule, but also the first regular war elephant corps employed in a Chinese army, that had gained the Southern Han victories throughout the 10th century.

=== By topic ===
==== Religion ====
- The grave of Swithun, Anglo-Saxon bishop of Winchester, is moved into an indoor shrine (he was previously buried outside) in the Old Minster. The ceremony is said to have been marred by 40 days of torrential rain.

== Births ==
- Kushyar Gilani, Persian mathematician and geographer (d. 1029)
- Mahmud of Ghazni, emir of the Ghaznavid Empire (d. 1030)
- Oliba, Spanish count and bishop (approximate date)
- Rajendra Chola, Emperor of Chola Dynasty at its peak

== Deaths ==
- Aditya Chola II, prince and ruler of the Chola dynasty (India)
- Abū Ja'far al-Khāzin, Persian astronomer (b. 900)
- Anemas, Byzantine (Muslim) army commander
- Atto, bishop of Vic (Spain) (approximate date)
- Cuilén (or Cuilean), king of Alba (Scotland)
- Eraclus (or Evraclus), bishop of Liège
- Ja'far ibn Fallah, Fatimid general and governor
- Kalokyros, Byzantine patrician and pretender
- Li Jingda, prince of Southern Tang (b. 924)
- Muhammad al-Khushani, Umayyad historian
- Muhammad ibn Rumahis, Umayyad admiral
- Ordgar, English ealdorman and advisor
- Qian Hongzong, king of Wuyue (approximate date)
- Ziri ibn Manad, founder of the Zirid dynasty
