= Akhu Muslim =

Abū Muḥammad ʿAbd Allāh ibn ʿUbayd Allāh al-Ḥusaynī (fl. 965–974), better known as Akhu Muslim ("brother of Muslim"), was a Husaynid sharif and governor of Palestine for the Ikhshidids. He opposed the takeover of the province by al-Hasan ibn Ubayd Allah ibn Tughj and joined the Qarmatians, fighting with them against the Fatimids until 974. After the defeat of the second Qarmatian invasion of Egypt in that year, Akhu Muslim fled to Arabia, pursued by Fatimid agents. He was betrayed in the end by his Qarmatian allies, who poisoned him near Basra.

== Family ==
Akhu Muslim was a descendant of Husayn ibn Ali (Note: His full genealogy is given by al-Maqrizi as "Abd Allah ibn Ubayd Allah ibn Tahir ibn Yahya ibn al-Hasan ibn Ja'far ibn Ubayd Allah ibn al-Husayn al-Asghar ibn Ali Zayn al-Abidin ibn al-Husayn ibn Ali".) through Ali Zayn al-Abidin, who had settled in Medina after Husayn's death in the Battle of Karbala. There the Husaynids had become the most prominent local family, and in the early 10th century, some of them had migrated to Egypt.

Akhu Muslim's father, Ubayd Allah, and uncle, al-Hasan, settled in Ramla, the chief city of Palestine. Akhu Muslim had two older brothers: Abu Ja'far Muslim, the elder brother, who was considered the leading Alid of his time and after whom Akhu Muslim himself was nicknamed, and Abu'l-Husayn Isa. Akhu Muslim married Sufia, the sister of the emir of Mecca, Ja'far ibn Muhammad al-Hasani.

== Career under the Ikhshidids ==
Contemporary accounts and later historians portray Akhu Muslim as a proud and haughty man; Kafur's court fool, Sibawaih, is known to have frequently ridiculed him for this. Nevertheless, Akhu Muslim apparently possessed some military ability, as he was entrusted by the Ikhshidid ruler Abu'l-Misk Kafur with command of an army sent to protect the Hajj pilgrimage of 965 from attacks by the Bedouin tribe of the Banu Sulaym in Syria. Although not entirely successful in his mission—the constant Bedouin and Qarmatian raids on the overland Hajj caravans and the inability of the Ikhshidid regime to stop them led to their temporary cessation after 965—a few months before his death in April 968, Kafur appointed Akhu Muslim as governor of Palestine.

After Kafur's death, an Ikhshidid prince, al-Hasan ibn Ubayd Allah ibn Tughj, had been named governor of Syria and Palestine. He arrived at Ramla to assume his post, but Akhu Muslim refused to surrender it. Allying himself with a local Bedouin leader, Timal al-Khafaji of the Banu Uqayl, Akhu Muslim attacked al-Hasan near Ramla, but was defeated. Akhu Muslim did not give up his ambitions, however: claiming for himself the heritage of the Alids, he is reported to have proclaimed himself caliph and to have claimed the title of Mahdi. When the Qarmatians invaded Syria and attacked al-Hasan at Ramla in October 968, Akhu Muslim joined them. The Ikhshidid prince was defeated and obliged to pay tribute to the Qarmatians, while Akhu Muslim, who distinguished himself in the battle, was given a command in the Qarmatian army.

== In Qarmatian service against the Fatimids ==
According to the 15th-century historian Idris Imad al-Din, Akhu Muslim led the Fatimid expedition against Byzantine-held Antioch in 970, which was abandoned after the defeat at the Battle of Alexandretta. This is obviously an error, however, as Akhu Muslim was staunchly opposed to the Fatimids and was allied with the Qarmatians, who invaded Fatimid-held Syria at the time. In August/September 971, the Qarmatians under al-Hasan al-A'sam defeated the Fatimid general Ja'far ibn Fallah and captured Damascus, before once again taking Ramla. A Fatimid army sent to reinforce Ibn Fallah under Sa'adat ibn Hayyan withdrew to Jaffa, and Akhu Muslim was placed in charge of besieging it, along with the Qarmatian Abu'l-Munaja Abdallah ibn Ali and the Uqayli leader Zalim ibn Mawhub, while al-A'sam led the bulk of his forces into Egypt.

The invasion ended in defeat at the Battle of Ayn Shams in December, and the Qarmatians withdrew to Palestine to regroup. The Fatimids went into the counteroffensive in 972, and managed to relieve the siege of Jaffa. Akhu Muslim was the nominal leader of the allied Qarmatian–Bedouin army against the Fatimids, but the alliance disintegrated due to infighting between the Qarmatians and the Bedouin, allowing the Fatimids to seize again control of Palestine and southern Syria. This new ascendancy did not last long, as the Qarmatians regrouped and drove the Fatimids out of the area.

In spring 974, the Qarmatians launched a second invasion of Egypt, where the local populace, exhausted by the Fatimids' heavy taxation, supported them. While the main Qarmatian army under al-A'sam occupied the Nile Delta, Akhu Muslim led a smaller force south, bypassed the Fatimid capital Cairo, and encamped between Asyut and Akhmim. From there he drove out the Fatimid tax officials, and raised the kharaj tax for his own account. Akhu Muslim's appearance in Egypt upset the hitherto rather amicable relations between the Fatimid dynasty and the ashraf families, as a number of ahsraf, especially younger sons, began to flock to his banner. Among those who joined him or tried to were his brother's son Ja'far ibn Muslim, a son and grandson of the chief Husaynid sharif of Damascus, Abu'l-Qasim Ahmad ibn al-Husayn al-Aqiqi, and the brother and son of the chief Hasanid sharif of Fustat, Abu Isma'il Ibrahim al-Rassi. Alarmed, both Caliph al-Mu'izz li-Din Allah and the Fatimid chief missionary, Abu Ja'far Nasr, who had befriended Akhu Muslim before the Fatimid conquest, wrote to him to persuade him to abandon the Qarmatian cause, but in vain.

In early April, Akhu Muslim defeated a Fatimid army sent against Akhmim. At the end of the month, the Fatimids under al-Mu'izz's son Abd Allah destroyed the main Qarmatian army, again near Ayn Shams. The Fatimids now turned south to eliminate Akhu Muslim. The latter was warned by carrier pigeon of their approach, but could not hope to stand against them with his small army. He dispersed his men, and fled, accompanied by a single Bedouin. While watering his horse at the Nile, Akhu Muslim narrowly escaped capture by a Fatimid patrol; his Bedouin companion allowed himself to be caught and claimed to be Akhu Muslim, giving the latter the opportunity to escape. After an arduous journey, narrated in detail by al-Maqrizi, Akhu Muslim managed to cross Egypt and made for the Hejaz, where evidently hoped to find shelter with his brother-in-law.

== Flight to Arabia and death ==
When he landed at the port of Aynuna, he was again nearly captured by a Fatimid patrol: the soldiers seized his coat, but he cut it with his sword and managed to escape the pursuit thanks to the speed of his horse. He settled in the great mosque of Medina for a while, until notices for his arrest were put up across the city; he then moved on, making for al-Ahsa, the capital of the Qarmatian state of Bahrayn.

The Qarmatians gave him scant welcome and support, and Akhu Muslim once again departed, now determined to seek the aid of the Buyids in Baghdad. He was betrayed by his erstwhile allies, however: threatened by the Buyids, the Qarmatians had opened negotiations with the Fatimids, and as a token of good faith, moved to eliminate the troublesome Akhu Muslim. One of their agents followed him, and poisoned his milk. After much suffering, Akhu Muslim died on the next morning, near Basra. His widow, who had gone into hiding and whose possessions in Egypt had been confiscated, received an amnesty at the intercession of her brother, the Emir of Mecca, who know acknowledged Fatimid suzerainty.

== Sources ==
- Bianquis, Thierry (1972). "La prise de pouvoir par les Fatimides en Égypte (357‑363/968‑974)" [The Seizure of Power by the Fatimids in Egypt (357–363/968–974)]. Annales islamologiques (in French). XI: 49–108. doi:10.3406/anisl.1972.950. ISSN 0570-1716.
- Gil, Moshe (1997) [1983]. A History of Palestine, 634–1099. Translated by Ethel Broido. Cambridge: Cambridge University Press. ISBN 0-521-59984-9.
- Halm, Heinz (2003). Die Kalifen von Kairo: Die Fatimiden in Ägypten, 973–1074 [The Caliphs of Cairo: The Fatimids in Egypt, 973–1074] (in German). Munich: C. H. Beck. ISBN 3-406-48654-1.
- Mortel, Richard T. (1991). "The Origins and Early History of the Husaynid Amirate of Madīna to the End of the Ayyūbid Period". Studia Islamica. 74 (74): 63–78. doi:10.2307/1595897. JSTOR 1595897.
