= Aayon Ibn Aayon =

Arab Muslim ophthalmologist during the period of medieval Islam

- أعين بن أعين

Personal life
- Born: Kairouan
- Died: December 995 Cairo, Egypt
- Era: Islamic golden age
- Other names: Ibn Aayon
- Occupation: ophthalmologist

Religious life
- Religion: Islam

Aayon Ibn Aayon (Arabic: أعين بن أعين) (died on Dhu al-Qadah 385 AH/December 995 AD), known as Ibn Aayon, was an Arab Muslim kahhal (ophthalmologist) during the period of medieval Islam. He moved from Kairouan to Egypt with Al-Mu'izz li-Din Allah, and he was known in Egypt during the caliphate of Al-Aziz Billah. His most notable work is Of eye diseases and their treatment (Arabic: في أمراض العين ومداواتها). Ibn Aayon was mentioned on Uyūn ul-Anbāʾ fī Ṭabaqāt al-Aṭibbā (Arabic: عيون الأنباء في طبقات الأطباء), a book written by Ibn Abi Usaibia.
