= Battle of Alexandretta =

971 battle of the Arab-Byzantine wars

- Part of the Arab–Byzantine wars
Date	Late spring 971
Location	near Alexandretta (modern-day İskenderun, Hatay, Turkey) 36.5817°N 36.1650°E
Result	Byzantine victory

Belligerents
Byzantine Empire	Fatimid Caliphate

Commanders and leaders
Nicholas	Aras; Ibn al-Zayyat

Strength
Unknown	4,000

Casualties and losses
Unknown	Very heavy
- Alexandretta (now İskenderun) within modern Turkey

The Battle of Alexandretta was the first clash between the forces of the Byzantine Empire and the Fatimid Caliphate in Syria. It was fought in early 971 near Alexandretta, while the main Fatimid army was besieging Antioch, which the Byzantines had captured two years previously. The Byzantines, led by one of Emperor John I Tzimiskes' household eunuchs, lured a 4,000-strong Fatimid detachment to attack their empty encampment and then attacked them from all sides, destroying the Fatimid force. The defeat at Alexandretta, coupled with the invasion of southern Syria by the Qarmatians, forced the Fatimids to lift the siege and secured Byzantine control of Antioch and northern Syria.

== Background ==
On 28 October 969, Antioch fell to the Byzantine commander Michael Bourtzes. The fall of the great metropolis of northern Syria was soon followed by a treaty between the Byzantines and the Hamdanid Emirate of Aleppo, which made Aleppo a tributary vassal and handed over to the Byzantine Empire the entirety of the former Abbasid frontier zones (thughur) in Cilicia and Upper Mesopotamia, as well as the coastal strip of Syria between the Mediterranean Sea and the Orontes River up to the environs of Tripoli, Arqa, and Shayzar. Byzantine control of this area was initially only theoretical, and the murder of the Byzantine emperor Nikephoros II Phokas in December 969 threatened to nullify Byzantine gains in the region.

At about the same time, further south, the forces of the Fatimid Caliphate of Ifriqiya, under the command of Jawhar al-Siqilli, conquered Egypt from its Ikhshidid rulers. Seized with the spirit of jihad (holy war) and aiming to legitimize their rule, the Fatimids used the Byzantine advance on Antioch and the "infidel" threat as a major item in their propaganda aimed towards the newly conquered region, along with promises to restore just government. The news of Antioch's fall helped to persuade the Fatimids to allow Jawhar to send Ja'far ibn Falah to invade Palestine. There, Ja'far defeated the last Ikhshidid remnants under al-Hasan ibn Ubayd Allah ibn Tughj and took Ramla in May 970, before occupying Damascus in November.

== Siege of Antioch and battle at Alexandretta ==
Almost as soon as Damascus submitted, Ja'far ibn Falah entrusted one of his ghilman (household slave soldiers), named Futuh ("Victories"), to carry out the promised jihad against the Byzantines, although the 15th-century compilation Uyun al-Akhbar by the Yemeni Isma'ili historian Idris Imad al-Din also mentions Akhu Muslim as commander. Futuh assembled a large army of Kutama Berbers, strengthened with levies from Palestine and southern Syria, and moved to besiege Antioch in December 970. The Byzantine writer Kedrenos claims that the Fatimid army numbered—a clearly much exaggerated—100,000 men, but Imad al-Din records the number as 20,000 men. The Fatimids laid siege to the city, but its inhabitants offered stiff resistance, and Ibn Falah had to send "army after army", in the description of the 14th-century historian Abu Bakr ibn al-Dawadari, apparently from the levies raised in southern Syria, to its reinforcement. Following the account of the 15th-century Egyptian al-Maqrizi, it was with these additional troops, which he puts at 4,000 men, that it became possible to completely halt the city's resupply by intercepting the caravans headed towards it.

In the meantime, Nikephoros' murderer and successor, John I Tzimiskes, was unable to intervene in person in the east due to the more menacing invasion of the Bulgaria by Sviatoslav I of Kiev. As a result, he sent a small force under a trusted eunuch of his household, the patrikios Nicholas, who according to the contemporary Leo the Deacon was experienced in battle, to relieve the siege. In the meantime, the siege of Antioch had continued for five months over winter and into spring, without result. At some point, a Fatimid detachment—according to Ibn al-Dawadari 4,000 men under a Berber chieftain called Aras and a former emir of Tarsus, Ibn al-Zayyat—moved north against Alexandretta, where the Byzantine relief army had camped. Informed of their approach, the Byzantine commander vacated the camp and placed his troops in ambush. Finding the enemy encampment deserted, the Fatimid troops began to plunder it, heedless of anything else. At that moment, Nicholas launched a surprise attack from all sides and the Fatimid force disintegrated; most of the Muslim army perished, but Aras with Ibn al-Zayyat managed to escape.

The defeat at Alexandretta was a major blow to Fatimid morale. Coupled with news of an advance against Damascus of the Qarmatians, a radical Isma'ili group originating from Eastern Arabia and rivals to the Fatimids, Ibn Falah ordered Futuh to raise the siege of Antioch in early July 971. The army returned to Damascus, whence the various contingents dispersed to their home districts.

== Aftermath ==
The first clash between the eastern Mediterranean's two foremost powers thus ended in a Byzantine victory, which on the one hand strengthened the Byzantine position in northern Syria and on the other weakened the Fatimids, both in lives lost and in morale and reputation. As the historian Paul Walker writes, had Ibn Falah "possessed the troops and the prestige lost at Alexandretta, he might have resisted the onrush of the Qarmatians. The armies of the local districts might have aided him had they not dispersed". In the end, Ja'far was unable to resist the Qarmatians and their Arab Bedouin allies; making the fatal choice of confronting them in the desert, he was defeated and killed in battle in August 971. It was a defeat that led to the near total collapse of Fatimid control in southern Syria and Palestine, and the Qarmatian invasion of Egypt. The Fatimids were victorious before Cairo, however, and eventually managed to drive the Qarmatians out of Syria and restore their control over the restive province. The Byzantines remained quiescent until the great campaigns led by John Tzimiskes in person in 974–975. Although the emperor advanced deep into Muslim lands and even threatened to take Jerusalem, his death in January 976 lifted the Byzantine danger for the Fatimids: the Byzantines would never again try to advance far beyond their northern Syrian possessions around Antioch.

== Sources ==
- Brett, Michael (2001). The Rise of the Fatimids: The World of the Mediterranean and the Middle East in the Fourth Century of the Hijra, Tenth Century CE. The Medieval Mediterranean. Vol. 30. Leiden: BRILL. ISBN 9004117415.
- Vasiliev, Alexander A.; Grégoire, Henri; Canard, Marius; Honigmann, Ernst [in German] (1935–1968). Byzance et les Arabes. Corpus Bruxellense Historiae Byzantinae (in French). Vol. 1–3 (in 4 volumes). Brussels: Institut de philologie et d'histoire orientales et slaves & Fondation Byzantine.
- Treadgold, Warren (1997). A History of the Byzantine State and Society. Stanford, California: Stanford University Press. ISBN 0-8047-2630-2.
- Walker, Paul E. (1972). "A Byzantine victory over the Fatimids at Alexandretta (971)". Byzantion: Revue internationale des études byzantines. 42. Brussels: 431–440. ISSN 0378-2506.
