= Al-Sayyida al-Mu'iziyya =

Wife of Al-Mu'izz li-Din Allah

Mother of the Imam-caliph
- Tenure: 975–995
- Born: Mahdia, Tunisia
- Died: c. 995; Cairo, Egypt
- Spouse: al-Mu'izz li-Din Allah
- Children: al-Aziz
Names
- Al-Sayyida al-Mu'iziyya Durzan

Al-Sayyida al-Mu'iziyya, mainly known as Durzan, was the main consort of Fatimid Caliph al-Muizz and the mother of the Fatimid imam-caliph al-Aziz. She was known as the first patroness of Fatimid architecture. Durzān also founded the second great Fățimid mosque of Cairo, a congregational mosque (no longer extant) located in the Qarafa.

== Biography ==
Durzan was born in the city of Mahdia, on the coast of modern-day Tunisia, in about 955, and was brought as a slave, or jariya, to the Fatimid harem. It is said that, because of her beautiful singing, she was also called Taghrid (lit. 'Singing As A Bird'). Although many Fatimid sources were destroyed, material evidence and literary sources exist that confirm the vastness of her patronage.

In 976, Durzan inaugurated the first phase through the building of the Jami al-Qarafa Mosque with her daughter, Sitt al-Mulk. As Cortese and Calinedri argue, this inauguration of the Jami al-Qarafa Mosque marked the first of the two main phases of Fatimid female architectural patronage. Durzan also sponsored a qasr (palace), a bath, a watering pool and a mausoleum.

Delia Cortese and Simonetta Calderini have noted Fatimid women’s patronage of public monuments and the link between piety – or religious propaganda – and charity during the delicate early stage of Fatimid rule.

In 973 she moved to the newly established Cairo to the court of the Caliph, where later she died in 995. It is said that when she died in Cairo, her daughter Sitt al-Malik mourned for a month.

== Further read ==
- Calderini, Simonetta; Cortese, Delia (2014-01-01). "5 The Architectural Patronage of the Fāṭimid Queen-Mother Durzān (d. 385/995): An Interdisciplinary Analysis of Literary Sources, Material Evidence and Historical Context". Material Evidence and Narrative Sources: 87–112. doi:10.1163/9789004279667_007. ISBN 9789004279667.
