= Al-Aziz Billah =

Fatimid dynasty caliph from 975 to 996

al-Aziz Billah العزيز بالله
- Caliph; Amir al-Mu'minīn
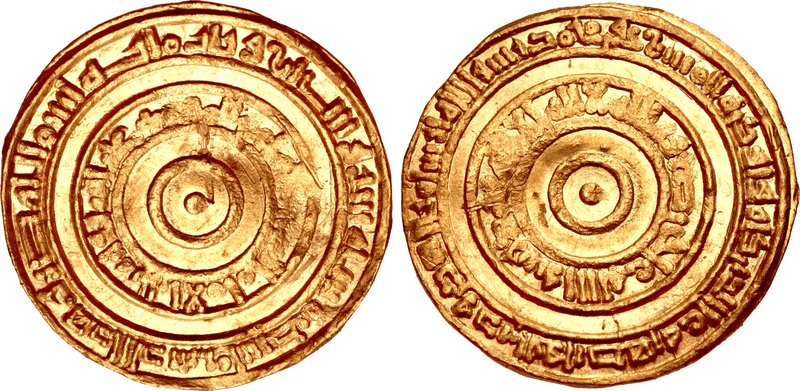
- Gold dinar of al-Aziz minted in Palestine in AH 366 (976/977 CE)

Imam–Caliph of the Fatimid Caliphate
- Reign: 18 December 975 – 13 October 996
- Predecessor: al-Mu'izz li-Din Allah
- Successor: al-Hakim bi-Amr Allah
- Born: 10 May 955
- Died: 13 October 996 (aged 41)
- Issue: al-Hakim bi-Amr Allah; Sitt al-Mulk
Names
- Kunya: Abu Mansur; Given name: Nizar; Laqab: al-Aziz Billah
- Dynasty: Fatimid
- Father: al-Mu'izz li-Din Allah
- Mother: Durzan al-Mu'iziyya
- Religion: Isma'ili Shia Islam

Abu Mansur Nizar (Arabic: أبو منصور نزار, romanized: Abū Manṣūr Nizār; 10 May 955 – 14 October 996), known by his regnal name as al-Aziz Billah (Arabic: العزيز بالله, romanized: al-ʿAzīz bi-l-Lāh, lit. 'the Mighty One through God'), was the fifth caliph of the Fatimid dynasty, from 975 to his death in 996. His reign saw the capture of Damascus and the Fatimid expansion into the Levant, which brought al-Aziz into conflict with the Byzantine emperor Basil II over control of Aleppo. During the course of this expansion, al-Aziz took into his service large numbers of Turkic and Daylamite slave-soldiers, thereby breaking the near-monopoly on Fatimid military power held until then by the Kutama Berbers.

== Biography ==
Nizar, the future al-Aziz Billah, was born on 10 May 955, the third son of the fourth Fatimid Caliph, al-Mu'izz li-Din Allah (r. 953–975). His mother, Durzan, usually known as al-Sayyida al-Muʿizzīya ('the Lady of al-Mu'izz') was the chief concubine of al-Mu'izz, and likely of Bedouin origin. She was known for her beautiful singing voice, which earned her the nickname Taghrīd ('Twitter'). She is also recorded as the first Fatimid female patron of architecture. She died in 995.

In 974 his older brother Abdallah ibn al-Mu'izz — who had been the designated heir in preference to the oldest of al-Mu'izz's sons, Tamim — died, and Nizar found himself as his father's designated successor (walī al-ʿahd). The succession was not confirmed (Note: The concept of designation of a successor (naṣṣ) is central to the early Shi'a, and particularly the Isma'ili, conception of the imamate, but it also presented complications: as the imam possessed God's infallibility (ʿiṣma), he could not possibly err, especially in as crucial a matter as the selection of his heir. Appointed heirs predeceasing their fathers was thus a source of considerable embarrassment. The custom therefore emerged that, while an heir might be clearly favoured during his father's reign, the naṣṣ was often withheld until shortly before the ruling imam's death, proclaimed in the latter's testament, or left as a bequest with a third party.) in front of the members of the dynasty and court, however, until a day before al-Mu'izz's death on 18 December 975. His official proclamation as caliph was delayed until 9 August 976.

=== Administration and economy ===
According to the sources, al-Aziz Billah was "tall, with red hair and blue eyes, generous, brave, fond of horses and hunting and very humane and tolerant in disposition". He was marked for his skill as an administrator, reforming the finances of the Fatimid state, standardizing and streamlining the payment of officials, and taking steps to ensure their integrity. At the same time, he was known for his extravagant lifestyle and obsession for precious objects and materials, rare animals and delicacies; it is said that on one occasion, he had carrier pigeons bring him cherries from Ba'albek. The Egyptian economy was also nurtured, and tax revenue thereby increased, through the expansion of streets and canals and the establishment of a stable currency. The general economic well-being was also apparent in an elaborate building programme.

The most influential official during most of his reign was Ya'qub ibn Killis, who was the first in Fatimid history to be designated as 'vizier', in 979. Apart from two brief periods when Ibn Killis fell into disgrace, in 979 and 984, he remained al-Aziz's chief minister until his death in 991. Just like his master, Ibn Killis lived in great luxury, facilitated by a salary of 100,000 gold dinars. Ibn Killis is credited with the capable administration of the public finances, which ensured a full treasury despite the vast sums expended by the luxury-loving Caliph, but also for his role as a patron of men of letters, and the author of a book that codified Fatimid laws. In contrast, his successors did not long remain in office. In the next five years, the post of vizier was occupied by six men: Ali ibn Umar al-Addas, Abu'l-Fadl Ja'far ibn al-Furat, al-Husayn ibn al-Hasan al-Baziyar, Abu Muhammad ibn Ammar, al-Fadl ibn Salih, and Isa ibn Nasturus ibn Surus.

=== Military reforms ===
Al-Aziz also undertook major military reforms. Berbers, and especially the Kutama tribe, were traditionally the mainstay of the Fatimid armies, and had played the main role in the takeover of Ifriqiya and the conquest of Egypt and the southern Levant under al-Aziz's predecessors. Until the 970s, the Kutama provided the cavalry, with the infantry composed of Slavic (Ṣaqāliba), Greek (Rūm) and Black African (Sūdān or ʿabīd) slaves.

However, the forays into the Levant revealed the inadequacies of an army based mostly on the Kutama, and from 978, al-Aziz began to introduce mercenaries from the Islamic East, especially Turkic and Daylamite slave-soldiers (ghilmān). The adoption of the ghilmān system had far-reaching repercussions, as the Turkic ghilmān rapidly assumed senior positions in the state and began to rival the Kutama for influence, especially as the flow of new recruits from the Kutama homeland ebbed after c. 987/88. Consequently, a fierce antagonism developed between the two groups, termed Maghāriba ('Westerners') and Mashāriqa ('Easterners') respectively, which would erupt in open warfare after al-Aziz's death.

=== Religious policies ===
The employment of the Christian Ibn Nesturus, just as that of the Jew Manashsha as Secretary for Syria, was a prominent example of the Fatimids' tolerance in religious matters, further encouraged under al-Aziz by his Melkite Christian wife. Two of her brothers, Orestes and Arsenius, were appointed as Patriarch of Jerusalem and metropolitan bishop of Cairo, respectively. The Coptic Christians also benefited from the Caliph's favour: for example, in allowing them to rebuild the Saint Mercurius Church despite Muslim opposition, or in refusing to punish a Muslim man who converted to Christianity. This leniency, crowned by the appointment to high office of Ibn Nesturus and Manashsha, was resented by the Muslim populace, incensed by hostile tracts circulating among them. The Caliph was briefly forced to depose his two ministers and imprison them, but soon their undoubted skill ensured their release and reinstatement. Anti-Christian animus was most evident in 996, when merchants from Amalfi were suspected of being responsible for a fire that destroyed the arsenal at Cairo; in a city-wide anti-Christian pogrom, the Amalfitans were murdered and churches were ransacked.

This tolerance did not extend towards the Sunni Muslim population, however, as al-Aziz followed a fervently Isma'ili agenda: he erected inscriptions denouncing the Companions of the Prophet, abolished the Tarawih prayers in 982, and initiated the celebration of the Ashura festival in Cairo. In 991, a man found in possession of the Sunni legal treatise Muwatta Imam Malik was executed.

The reign of Al-Aziz was also culturally significant. Ibn Killis founded the al-Azhar University in Cairo (988) which went on to become the most important centre of learning in the Islamic world. Likewise a library with 200,000 volumes was built in Cairo.

According to Professor Samy S. Swayd, Fatimid missionaries made their Dawah in China during the reign of al-Aziz.

=== Expansion into Syria ===
Map of Early Islamic Syria and its provinces in the 9th–10th centuries

In foreign affairs, al-Aziz concentrated on the extension of Fatimid control over Syria, the conquest of which had begun immediately after the Fatimid conquest of Egypt in 969.

==== Background ====
Possession of Syria, and particularly Palestine, was a constant foreign policy objective for many rulers of Egypt both before and after the Fatimids, to foreclose the most likely invasion route into the country by the empires of Western Asia. In the Fatimid case, this drive was given additional impetus by their ambitions to lead the entire Islamic world and unseat the Abbasid Caliphate by conquering Iraq and the eastern Islamic lands, which was possible only via Syria. At the same time, the balance of power in the region was altered with the simultaneous expansion of the Byzantine Empire into northern Syria against the Hamdanid Emirate of Aleppo, culminating in the capture of Antioch in 969. The Fatimids used the Byzantine advance as a major item in their propaganda, claiming to be the only power capable of championing the jihād against the 'infidel' threat. However, Fatimid policy with regard to Syria during the early part of al-Aziz's reign was dominated by the vizier Ibn Killis, who, according to historian Hugh N. Kennedy, "believed that the Fatimids should concentrate on controlling Palestine and southern Syria, while leaving the north of the Hamdanids and their successors to form a buffer state against the Byzantines, with whom the caliph should try to keep on good terms".

Despite initial successes, the first Fatimid invasion of Syria, under the Kutama general Ja'far ibn Fallah, quickly came to a halt through a combination of rebellions by the citizens of Damascus and the Bedouin tribes of the Syrian Desert. In August 971, the Fatimids were defeated in battle against the Bedouin and their Qarmatian allies, leading to the near total collapse of Fatimid control in southern Syria and Palestine, and even a Qarmatian invasion of Egypt in 971 and again in 974.

When al-Aziz came to power, Damascus was ruled by the Turk Alptakin, who with only 300 of his fellow Turks had taken power by exploiting the unpopularity of the Fatimids' Kutama troops, gained popular support by restoring order in the city, and held it against the Fatimids, recognizing Abbasid suzerainty. Further south, Palestine was under Fatimid control, but the powerful Bedouin chieftain of the Banu Tayy tribe, Mufarrij ibn Daghfal ibn al-Jarrah, was opposed to them and held the provincial capital Ramla.

==== Reconquest of Damascus ====
"O Commander of the Faithful, maintain peace with the Byzantines as long as they maintain peace with you. Be satisfied if the Hamdanids [of Aleppo] recognize you in the mint and the [Friday] oration. Do not spare Mufarrij ibn Daghfal ibn Jarrah, [however], if you get hold of him."

— Advice of Ya'qub ibn Killis to al-Aziz on his deathbed.

In 975 al-Aziz took control of Baniyas in an attempt to subdue the anti-Fatimid agitation of the Sunni Muhammad ibn Ahmad al-Nablusi and his followers.

In 976, the Fatimid general Jawhar, the conqueror of Egypt, campaigned against Damascus, but after two months of clashes before the city he had to retreat due to the arrival of Alptakin's Qarmatian allies. Followed by Alptakin's forces, Jawhar was pushed back to Tiberias, Ramla and finally Ascalon, where he was besieged. The siege lasted for seventeen months and ended in early 978 with a negotiated agreement, which abandoned the entire territory from Ascalon to Damascus to Alptakin. Only Gaza remained under direct Fatimid control, although Alptakin was prepared to acknowledge the nominal suzerainty of al-Aziz over the territories he ruled. Jawhar and his men had also to undergo the humiliation of passing under a sword and lance in token of their defeat while departing Ascalon for Egypt.

The Fatimid court could not accept this humiliating agreement, which not only left Egypt vulnerable to attack, but also deprived senior members of the Fatimid elite—including Ibn Killis himself—of important properties around Damascus. As a result, al-Aziz took the field in person and, at the head of an enormous army, defeated and captured Alptakin at the Battle of Tawahin on 15 August 978. The Qarmatians were bribed with promises of an annual payment of tribute to retreat to Bahrayn, thus bringing an end to their incursions into Syria. The events of the previous years also demonstrated to Ibn Killis the dangers of continuing to rely on the Kutama. As a result, the Caliph unexpectedly showed clemency to Alptakin, taking him and his Turkish followers into Fatimid service. Alptakin himself was taken to Cairo, where he was lavishly honoured by the Caliph, arousing the envy of Ibn Killis, who had Alptakin poisoned. Nevertheless, as noted before, this event was of momentous importance and marked a major departure from previous Fatimid practice; especially in Syria, the Turkish ghilmān remained influential and men from their ranks often occupied the position of governor of Damascus.

Damascus itself was taken over by one of Alptakin's lieutenants, Qassam, with the support of the local population and the city militia (aḥdāth), who wished to avoid a renewed Berber occupation. The Fatimid general al-Fadl ibn Salih, a protégé of Ibn Killis, was sent with a Berber army against Qassam, but other than a show of force against the coastal cities failed to achieve anything and retreated to Palestine. Matters became complicated with the arrival of Abu Taghlib, the ousted Hamdanid ruler of Mosul, who contacted al-Aziz with an offer to capture the city if they supported him with troops. This was opposed by Ibn al-Jarrah, lest the Hamdanid and his followers from the Banu Uqayl tribe, rivals to the Tayy, threaten his own position, particularly his possession of Ramla and the pasture lands of his tribe. Al-Fadl apparently played a duplicitous game, encouraging Abu Taghlib in his designs on Ramla in an effort to sow dissension among the Arab tribes and strengthen Fatimid authority; however, in August 979, when Ibn al-Jarrah attacked Abu Taghlib and his men at Ramla, al-Fadl came to his aid with his own troops. Abu Taghlib was taken captive and executed. This battle established Ibn al-Jarrah and his Tayy as a major player in the region's power politics: despite his recognition of Fatimid suzerainty, the Tayy chieftain was a virtually independent ruler and remained a constant nuisance for the Fatimid government for decades.

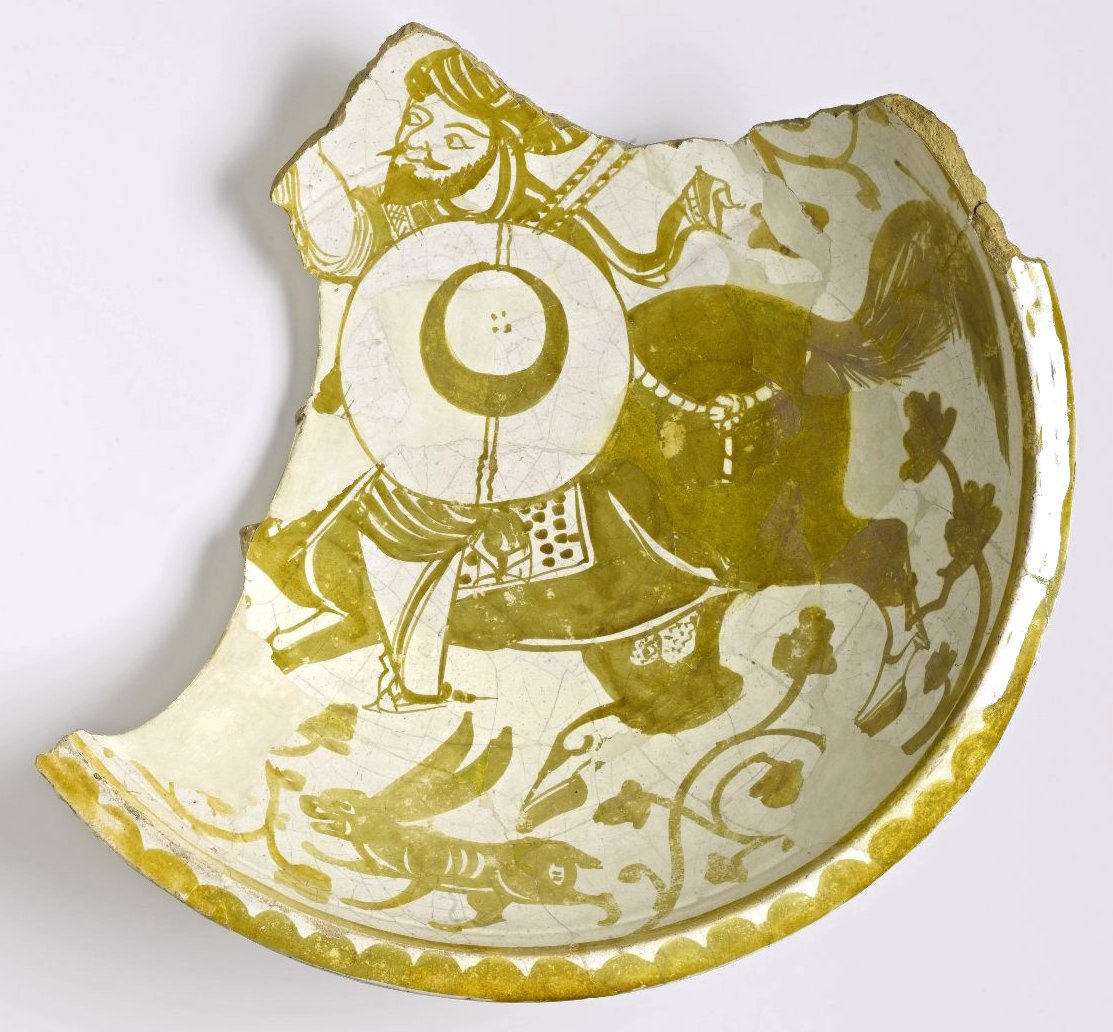
Bowl fragment with a mounted warrior, 11th century

Damascus continued to resist Fatimid attempts to capture it, notably under the Kutama chieftain Sulayman ibn Ja'far ibn Fallah in 979/80. At the same time, despite al-Fadl's efforts to use the Uqayl to contain them, the Tayy and their unchecked depredations grew to be a menace to the settled and agricultural districts of southern Syria: Ramla was "reduced to a ghost town", in the words of Kennedy, and the Ghouta plain around Damascus and the Hawran region were so devastated that Damascus faced famine, alleviated only through supplies sent from Homs, ruled by the Turk Bakjur for the Hamdanids of Aleppo. As a result of the successive failures of Berber commanders to capture Damascus and restore order in the province, the Fatimid court appointed a Turk, Baltakin, a former follower of Alptakin, as commander of the next expedition into Syria. Baltakin defeated Ibn al-Jarrah, who fled north to Antioch and the protection of the Byzantines, while Qassam was finally forced to surrender Damascus in early 983, albeit under generous terms that allowed him to remain in control under a Fatimid-appointed governor.

==== Contest for Aleppo ====
After securing Fatimid rule in central and southern Syria, Caliph al-Aziz aimed to capture Aleppo as well, but was restrained by Ibn Killis while he lived. The question of Aleppo was complicated, as it risked provoking a direct confrontation with Byzantium. Since 969, the Hamdanid emirate had been tributary to the Byzantines. Its ruler, Sa'd al-Dawla (r. 967–991), resented this dependence, but was forced to abide with it in order to prevent an outright Fatimid conquest. As a result, his policy vacillated between the two powers. Nevertheless, the Fatimids benefited from the weakness of the Hamdanids, as many Hamdanid supporters began entering Fatimid service. For example, Raja al-Siqlabi defected with 300 of his men, and was appointed governor of Acre and Caesarea.

The most important such defection was that of the Hamdanid governor of Homs, Bakjur, in 983. Bakjur contacted al-Aziz directly and offered to enter Fatimid service against Aleppo in exchange for the governorship of Damascus. Attracted by the possibility of taking over not only Homs but possibly Aleppo as well, al-Aziz agreed to Bakjur's offer over the vehement opposition of Ibn Killis, who was briefly deposed and imprisoned in conjunction with a harvest failure that led to famine in the capital. The Caliph provided Bakjur with an army, with which he attacked Aleppo in September. Sa'd al-Dawla was forced to appeal to the Byzantine emperor Basil II (r. 976–1025) for help, who sent his general Bardas Phokas the Younger to assist Aleppo. Forewarned of the Byzantines' approach by the exiled Ibn al-Jarrah, Bakjur raised the siege and fled to Fatimid territory. The Byzantines proceeded to sack Homs in October, and returned the city to Hamdanid control. In 987/88, a seven-year truce was concluded with the Byzantines. It stipulated an exchange of prisoners, the recognition of the Byzantine emperor as protector of Christians under Fatimid rule and of the Fatimid caliph as protector of Muslims under Byzantine control, and the replacement of the name of the Abbasid caliph with that of the Fatimid caliph in the Friday prayer in the mosque at Constantinople.

Despite his failure, Bakjur was named governor of Damascus by al-Aziz, and was joined by Ibn al-Jarrah. Ibn Killis, who was released and restored to his office after barely two months, immediately began working against the two. Bakjur gradually made himself unpopular to the Damascenes due to his cruelty, and after several failed efforts, in 989 Ibn Killis finally persuaded al-Aziz to replace Bakjur with one of the vizier's personal ghilmān, Ya'qub al-Siqlabi. Bakjur fled to Raqqa, from where he continued his unsuccessful attacks on Aleppo. At the same time, Baltakin was sent to pacify the Bedouin tribes who were raiding the Hajj caravans, leading to the establishment of a Fatimid garrison at Wadi al-Qura, north of Medina.

Ibn Killis' death in 991 freed al-Aziz to pursue a more aggressive stance in the Aleppo question. Immediately he dismissed Ibn Killis' protégé and appointed the Turk Manjutakin as governor of Damascus. Manjutakin's use of Damascus as his base during the subsequent campaigns shows the consolidation of Fatimid control in the area, but also, as Hugh Kennedy remarks, the changes it brought to the "political and economic geography of Syria": given the continued insecurity of the overland routes due to the depredations of the Bedouin, the Fatimids supplied their forces in Syria by sea—notably via Tripoli—and as a result the chief coastal towns rose in importance, as centres of Fatimid control and administration as well as commerce, experiencing a revival which continued into the 12th century.

Manjutakin invaded the Hamdanid emirate, defeated a Byzantine force under the doux of Antioch, Michael Bourtzes, in June 992, and laid siege to Aleppo. However, he failed to pursue the siege with vigour and the city was easily able to resist until, in the spring of 993, after thirteen months of campaigning, Manjutakin was forced to return to Damascus due to lack of supplies. In spring 994, Manjutakin launched another invasion, again defeated Bourtzes at the Battle of the Orontes in September and again besieged Aleppo. The blockade was far more effective this time and soon caused a severe lack of food, but the city's defenders held out until the sudden arrival of the Byzantine emperor, Basil II, in person in April 995. Basil crossed Asia Minor in only sixteen days at the head of an army; his sudden arrival, and the exaggerated numbers circulating for his army, caused panic in the Fatimid army. Manjutakin burned his camp and retreated to Damascus without giving battle.

The Byzantines besieged Tripoli but failed to capture it; nevertheless, the Fatimids lost control of the city, which became independent under its qadi. The Byzantine emperor then occupied and fortified Tartus. Al-Aziz himself now prepared to take the field against the Byzantines himself, beginning large-scale preparations at Cairo. Byzantine and Hamdanid embassies carrying proposals for a truce were received in September 995, but rejected. Al-Aziz's preparations were set back when the fleet being prepared at Cairo was destroyed by a fire, which set off an anti-Christian pogrom in the city. Manjutakin was ordered to recapture Tartus, but its Armenian garrison was able to fend off his attacks; and a Fatimid fleet sent to assist the siege was lost in a storm off the coast. Al-Aziz died on 14 October 996, before setting out on his campaign. The Byzantine–Fatimid conflict continued under his successor until the conclusion of a ten-year truce in 1000.

=== Expansion in Arabia and withdrawal from North Africa ===
Along with Syria, al-Aziz presided over an expansion of Fatimid influence in the Arabian Peninsula. The Hajj—or at least those caravans setting off from Cairo with the pilgrims of the western Islamic world—was placed under Fatimid control and protection, despite the considerable cost it entailed. The emirs of Mecca, although de facto autonomous, recognized the Fatimids' suzerainty since the conquest of Egypt, in token of which the Fatimids enjoyed the prestigious privilege of furnishing each year the new cover of the Kaaba (the kiswa) and of raising a ceremonial crown, the shamsa before the Kaaba. The death of al-Mu'izz in 975 was used as a pretext—very likely with Qarmatian encouragement—by the Sharif of Mecca for the renunciation of Fatimid suzerainty, but the dispatch of an army that cut off the city's supply swiftly restored Fatimid control.

Finally, in 992 the Fatimids were acknowledged as caliphs in the Yemen, and even their old enemies, the Qarmatians of Bahrayn, came around to acknowledge their claims. According to Kennedy, these diplomatic victories were the result of the more energetic foreign policy pursued by al-Aziz, particularly after the death of Ibn Killis, which bolstered his credentials by demonstrating "his ability and willingness to undertake the two major public responsibilities of a caliph, to safeguard the Hajj and to lead the Muslims against the infidel Byzantines".

On the other hand, North Africa, including the former Fatimid heartland of Ifriqiya, was mostly neglected. Effective power there had passed to the Zirid viceroy of Ifriqiya, Buluggin ibn Ziri (r. 972–984), who was confirmed in office by al-Aziz, as was his son al-Mansur (r. 984–996). In 992, al-Aziz even confirmed al-Mansur's son Badis as heir-apparent, thereby strengthening the Zirids' claim to dynastic succession. Indeed, as Kennedy remarks, "nothing is more striking than the speed with which [the Fatimids] were prepared to allow North Africa to go its own way". Apart from diplomatic exchanges of gifts, the Zirids governed their domains increasingly independently from the Fatimid court, even to the point of warring with the Kutama, the erstwhile mainstay of the Fatimid regime. In a similar manner, al-Aziz contended himself with recognizing the succession of the Kalbid emirs of Sicily after the event. Nearer to Egypt, the governor of Barqa (Cyrenaica) is known to have brought presents to the court of Cairo, but otherwise there are no indications of the Fatimids' exercising any control over him.

Al-Aziz died on 13 October 996. His son Al-Hakim bi-Amr Allah (996-1021) succeeded him as Caliph.

== Family ==
Information about al-Aziz's consorts is unclear. His oldest surviving child was a daughter, Sitt al-Mulk, born in 970. Her mother is designated as an umm walad in the sources, indicating that at some point she also bore al-Aziz a son, who apparently died in infancy. She is commonly identified with the Sayyida al-ʿAzīzīya ("the Lady of Aziz") who is frequently mentioned in the sources, and died in 995. In 979, al-Aziz married a cousin of his (the precise relation is unknown). He also had a third wife, a Byzantine Greek Christian, who was the mother of his successor, al-Hakim.

== See also ==
- List of Ismaili imams
- List of rulers of Islamic Egypt

== Sources ==
- Bacharach, Jere L. (1975). "The Career of Muḥammad Ibn Ṭughj Al-Ikhshīd, a Tenth-Century Governor of Egypt". Speculum. 50 (4): 586–612. doi:10.2307/2855469. ISSN 0038-7134. JSTOR 2855469. S2CID 161166177.
- Bianquis, Thierry (1986). Damas et la Syrie sous la domination fatimide (359-468/969-1076): essai d'interprétation de chroniques arabes médiévales. Tome premier (in French). Damascus: Institut français de Damas. ISBN 978-2-35159130-7.
- Brett, Michael (2001). The Rise of the Fatimids: The World of the Mediterranean and the Middle East in the Fourth Century of the Hijra, Tenth Century CE. The Medieval Mediterranean. Vol. 30. Leiden: BRILL. ISBN 978-90-04-11741-9.
- Canard, Marius (1960). "al-ʿAzīz Biʾllāh". In Gibb, H. A. R.; Kramers, J. H.; Lévi-Provençal, E.; Schacht, J.; Lewis, B. & Pellat, Ch. (eds.). The Encyclopaedia of Islam, Second Edition. Volume I: A–B. Leiden: E. J. Brill. pp. 823–825. OCLC 495469456.
- Cortese, Delia; Calderini, Simonetta (2006). Women and the Fatimids in the World of Islam. Edinburgh: Edinburgh University Press. ISBN 0-7486-1733-7.
- Daftary, Farhad (2007). The Ismāʿı̄lı̄s: Their History and Doctrines (Second ed.). Cambridge: Cambridge University Press. ISBN 978-0-521-61636-2.
- Gil, Moshe (1997) [1983]. A History of Palestine, 634–1099. Translated by Ethel Broido. Cambridge: Cambridge University Press. ISBN 0-521-59984-9.
- Halm, Heinz (2003). Die Kalifen von Kairo: Die Fatimiden in Ägypten, 973–1074 [The Caliphs of Cairo: The Fatimids in Egypt, 973–1074] (in German). Munich: C. H. Beck. ISBN 3-406-48654-1.
- Halm, Heinz (2015). "Prinzen, Prinzessinnen, Konkubinen und Eunuchen am fatimidischen Hof" [Princes, Princesses, Concubines and Eunuchs at the Fatimid Court]. In Pomerantz, Maurice A.; Shahin, Aram A. (eds.). The Heritage of Arabo-Islamic Learning. Studies Presented to Wadad Kadi (in German). Leiden and Boston: Brill. pp. 91–110. ISBN 978-90-04-30590-8.
- Kennedy, Hugh (2004) [1986]. The Prophet and the Age of the Caliphates: The Islamic Near East from the 6th to the 11th Century (Second ed.). Harlow: Longman. ISBN 978-0-582-40525-7.
- Lev, Yaacov (1987). "Army, Regime, and Society in Fatimid Egypt, 358–487/968–1094". International Journal of Middle East Studies. 19 (3): 337–365. doi:10.1017/S0020743800056762. JSTOR 163658. S2CID 162310414.
- Lev, Yaacov (1991). State and Society in Fatimid Egypt. Leiden: Brill. ISBN 90-04-09344-3.
- Lev, Yaacov (1995). "The Fatimids and Byzantium, 10th–12th Centuries". Graeco-Arabica. 6: 190–208. OCLC 183390203.
- Salibi, Kamal S. (1977). Syria Under Islam: Empire on Trial, 634–1097, Volume 1. Delmar: Caravan Books. ISBN 9780882060132.
- Stevenson, William B. (1926). "Chapter VI. Islam in Syria and Egypt (750–1100)". In Bury, John Bagnell (ed.). The Cambridge Medieval History, Volume V: Contest of Empire and Papacy. New York: The Macmillan Company. pp. 242–264.
- Walker, Paul E. (1995). "Succession to Rule in the Shiite Caliphate". Journal of the American Research Center in Egypt. 32: 239–264. doi:10.2307/40000841. JSTOR 40000841.
- Walker, Paul E. (2009). "al-ʿAzīz bi-llāh". In Fleet, Kate; Krämer, Gudrun; Matringe, Denis; Nawas, John; Rowson, Everett (eds.). Encyclopaedia of Islam (3rd ed.). Brill Online. ISSN 1873-9830.

al-Aziz Billah Fatimid dynasty Born: 9 May 955 Died: 13 October 996
Regnal titles
Preceded by al-Mu'izz li-Din Allah	Fatimid Caliph; 21 December 975 – 13 October 996	Succeeded by al-Hakim bi-Amr Allah
Shia Islam titles
Preceded by al-Mu'izz li-Din Allah	Imam of Isma'ilism; 21 December 975 – 13 October 996	Succeeded by al-Hakim bi-Amr Allah
