= Jawhar (general) =

Fatimid military officer (died 992)

Al-Qaid Jawhar ibn Abdallah (Arabic: جوهر بن عبد الله, romanized: Jawhar ibn ʿAbd Allāh, known variously as al-Siqillī (“the Sicilian”), al-Rūmī (“the Greek”), al-Kātib (“the royal secretary”), al-Qā’id (“the military commander”) and al-Saqlabī (“the slave”) born in Sicily and died 28 April 992, was a famous Fatimid general of Byzantine Greek origin from Sicily who led the conquest of Maghreb, and subsequently the conquest of Egypt, for the 4th Fatimid Imam-Caliph al-Mu'izz li-Din Allah. He served as viceroy of Egypt until al-Mu'izz's arrival in 973, consolidating Fatimid control over the country. After that, he retired from public life until his death.

== Biography ==
The birth date of Jawhar is not known, but as he died in 992, and the peak of his career was between 950 and 975, he cannot have been born earlier than the 900s. Jawhar's father, Abdallah, was a slave from Sicily, and Jawhar is first mentioned as a slave-soldier (ghulām) and possibly a secretary to the third Fatimid caliph, al-Mansur bi-Nasr Allah (r. 946–953). In 958, al-Mansur's son and successor, al-Mu'izz li-Din Allah (r. 953–975) chose Jawhar to lead a campaign to restore Fatimid control over the central and western parts of North Africa. In this campaign, Jawhar first gave proof of his exceptional military talents. He first led the Fatimid armies to victory over the Zenata tribe that had allied with the Fatimids' rivals, the Umayyads of the Caliphate of Córdoba, defeating and killing their leader, Ya'la ibn Muhammad al-Yafrani. He then turned southeast towards Sijilmasa, capturing and killing its ruler Muhammad ibn al-Fath ibn Maymun ibn Midrar. It was not until a year later, in October 960, that he moved north towards Fez, taking the city by storm on 13 November and capturing its Umayyad governor, Ahmad ibn Abi Bakr al-Judhami. With this victory, all of the Maghreb, apart from Tangier and Ceuta, came under Fatimid control, or recognized Fatimid suzerainty. As a token of his victory, Jawhar is said to have sent jars filled with live fish from the Atlantic Ocean to the Caliph in Ifriqiya.

It is reported that Al-Mu'izz li-Din Allah would spend hours discussing tactics and strategy with Al-Qaid Jawhar in his tent before the campaign of North Africa began, and when they finally parted, Al-Mu'izz granted Al-Qaid Jawhar with very high honors requiring all soldiers to disembark their horse as a sign of respect for the commander-in-chief.

After the Western borders had been secured, Jawhar led the Fatimid invasion of Ikhshidid Egypt (969). He approached Egypt from the direction of Alexandria and marched towards the capital, Fustat. His army encountered little resistance and the country was secured by a treaty with the Ikhshidid vizier Abu Ja'far Muslim. Some divisions of the Ikhshidid army mutinied in protest and took up positions on Roda Island in the Nile, to defend the river crossing and prevent the Fatimid army from gaining access to Fustat. Jawhar stormed the island with his Kutama troops and cleared away the enemy soldiers before proceeding to peacefully enter Fustat.

As Jawhar pacified Egypt the Fatimid army began its invasion of Ikhshidid Syria (970) under the Kutama general Ja'far ibn Falah. After initial successes this army was destroyed near Damascus in August 971 by a coalition of Ikhshidid soldiers and Arab tribesmen led by the Qarmatians of Bahrain. Egypt was left defenceless and was invaded by the coalition in September. Jawhar had few troops at hand so he mobilised the entire population of Fustat to build a defensive line consisting of a wall and a ditch at a bottleneck north of the city. As the coalition army stalled in the Nile Delta Jawhar managed to finish his preparations in time. The invaders' attempt to take Fustat was foiled by the defences and Jawhar routed them in battle outside the city with his raw troops.

=== Last campaign ===
Jawhar played at least a formal role in the designation of al-Mu'izz's younger son, Nizar, as designated heir a few days before the caliph's death in December 975: Jawhar and the court physician accompanied Nizar out of the room in which al-Mu'izz lay dying and placed him on a throne, thus signifying his designation. The new caliph, al-Aziz, was confronted with the problem of Syria, where a series of Fatimid attempts to expand into the region failed due to the opposition of the local urban militias (ahdath) and the Banu Uqayl Bedouin, the intervention of the Turkic commander Alptakin, who ousted the Fatimids from Damascus and became its ruler, and the Qarmatians, who allied with Alptakin. In the first half of 976, the Qarmatians occupied Palestine, while the Fatimids only held isolated coastal cities, under threat from the Qarmatians and Alptakin.

In response to this situation, and on the advice of Ya'qub ibn Killis, in May al-Aziz entrusted Jawhar with leading an army of 20,000 men—the largest Fatimid force hitherto sent to Syria—to confront the Qarmatians and Alptakin. The Qarmatians quickly retreated before the Fatimid advance, leaving only a small part of their number to join Alptakin at Tiberias. From Ramla, Jawhar sent a letter to Alptakin promising pardon, as well as a robe of honour and money—effectively an offer to enter the Fatimid service, which the Turk refused. Nevertheless, Alptakin too was forced to withdraw to Damascus before the numerically stronger Fatimid army. Jawhar's army arrived before Damascus in July 976, erected a fortified camp, and began a siege that lasted for several months, punctuated by skirmishes. As Alptakin had gathered the entire harvest of the region into the city, the Fatimid army suffered from hunger with the onset of winter. When news of a Qarmatian army under al-Hasan al-A'sam approaching the city, Jawhar decided to lift the siege and withdrew from Damascus in December/January, as the Fatimids were now outnumbered by their opponents.

Jawhar retreated south, first to Tiberias and then towards Ramla, closely followed by his enemies, who were now joined by the numerous Banu Tayy tribes—the medieval chroniclers speak of 50,000 Bedouin—under the leadership of the Jarrahid family. Jawhar lost many men to the freezing cold and snow, and after a defeat in a bloody battle on the Yarkon River, found himself besieged at Ramla. There the Fatimid army was further debilitated by lack of supplies and even water. Jawhar was forced to abandon Ramla for the coastal fortress of Ascalon. The Qarmatians entered Ramla on 12 March 977, and soon, joined by the forces of Alptakin, placed Ascalon under siege as well. The blockade lasted for fifteen months, during which time Jawhar lost the bulk of his army to starvation. At long last, Jawhar was obliged to enter into negotiations with the more receptive Alptakin—the Qarmatians vehemently opposed any deal and proposed to maintain the siege until their enemies died of hunger—and was allowed to leave in March/April 978 after a humiliating capitulation: the surviving Fatimid troops marched out of Ascalon passing under Alptakin's sword, which had been slung at the city gate. Jawhar agreed to abandon all Fatimid claims to rule lands north of Gaza, while Alptakin retained rule of the rest of Syria; whether he accepted a Fatimid suzerainty, as reported by Yahya of Antioch, or not, he was de facto independent.

=== Death ===
The capitulation at Ascalon put an end to Jawhar's military career. He died on 28 April 992. He is presumed to be buried in Cairo, Egypt, but his resting place is unknown as of yet.

== See also ==
- 10th century in Lebanon § The Fatimids

== Sources ==
- Brett, Michael (2017). The Fatimid Empire. The Edinburgh History of the Islamic Empires. Edinburgh: Edinburgh University Press. ISBN 978-1-4744-2151-5.
- Daftary, Farhad (2007). The Ismāʿı̄lı̄s: Their History and Doctrines (Second ed.). Cambridge: Cambridge University Press. ISBN 978-0-521-61636-2.
- Gil, Moshe (1997) [1983]. A History of Palestine, 634–1099. Translated by Ethel Broido. Cambridge: Cambridge University Press. ISBN 0-521-59984-9.
- Halm, Heinz (2003). Die Kalifen von Kairo: Die Fatimiden in Ägypten, 973–1074 [The Caliphs of Cairo: The Fatimids in Egypt, 973–1074] (in German). Munich: C. H. Beck. ISBN 3-406-48654-1.
- Monés, Hussain (1965). "D̲j̲awhar al-Ṣiḳillī". In Lewis, B.; Pellat, Ch. & Schacht, J. (eds.). The Encyclopaedia of Islam, Second Edition. Volume II: C–G. Leiden: E. J. Brill. pp. 494–495. doi:10.1163/1573-3912_islam_SIM_2034. OCLC 495469475.
