= Abdallah ibn al-Mu'izz =

Son the fourth Fatimid caliph, al-Mu'izz

Abdallah ibn al-Mu'izz (died 8 February 975) was the son and heir-apparent of the fourth Fatimid caliph, al-Mu'izz (r. 953–975), but died before him.

Abdallah was the second oldest of al-Mu'izz's sons, and was designated heir in 972, as part of the preparations for the move of the Fatimid court from Ifriqiya to recently conquered Egypt. The aim was probably to safeguard the succession, against what was expected to be a difficult and perilous journey. The designation had initially been communicated to a select few senior officials and kept secret even from Abdallah himself, but the elderly majordomo Jawdhar revealed the secret when he performed obeisance to Abdallah before the assembled court. The disillusioned eldest son, Tamim, was then involved in an unsuccessful conspiracy with the son of the Kalbid Emir of Sicily.

Initially this appointment was not widely publicized beyond the court, but Abdallah's name was proclaimed publicly alongside his father's after their arrival in Egypt in June 973. In April 974, during the Qarmatian invasion of Egypt, Abdallah was put in command of the Fatimid army and led it to a decisive victory, that forced the Qarmatians to withdraw back to their home in Bahrayn. In the aftermath of the victory, on 26 May, the victorious Abdallah made a triumphal entrance into Cairo, accompanied by the most prominent captives on the backs of camels, and several thousand severed heads of the Qarmatian fallen impaled on lances; his position as heir apparent was further underlined by riding under the caliphal parasol, the mizalla. Abdallah predeceased his father, dying after a brief illness on 8 February 975. Abdallah's younger brother, Nizar, was presented to the court as the designated heir a few days before al-Mu'izz died in December of the same year, and even ruled for several months after his father's death in the latter's name, before finally publicly announcing al-Mu'izz's death and his own ascension to the throne as Caliph al-Aziz (r. 975–996).

Abdallah was the last Fatimid prince or heir apparent to be given important military commands, especially as most subsequent Fatimid caliphs ascended the throne as children. Abdallah had at least one son, whose name is unknown, but who unsuccessfully conspired with Sitt al-Mulk to usurp the throne from the underage al-Hakim (r. 996–1021) in 996, and ended his life in prison. A daughter, named Amina and known by the sobriquet Ruqya (lit. 'charm'), later became the concubine of al-Hakim and mother of his successor, al-Zahir (r. 1021–1036).

Family tree of the Fatimid dynasty

Abu Muhammad Abdallah **al-Mahdi bi'llah** (r. 909–934)
Abu'l-Qasim Muhammad **al-Qa'im bi-Amr Allah** (r. 934–946)	Abu Ali Ahmad	Other children
al-Qasim^{§}	Abu Tahir Isma'il **al-Mansur bi'llah** (r. 946–953)	Other children
Abu Tamim Ma'ad **al-Mu'izz li-Din Allah** (r. 953–975)	Abd al-Rahim^{§}
Tamim	Abdallah^{§}	Abu Mansur Nizar **al-Aziz bi'llah** (r. 975–996)	Other children
Amina	Abu Ali Mansur **al-Hakim bi-Amr Allah** (r. 996–1021)	Sitt al-Mulk	Other children
Abu'l-Hasan Ali **al-Zahir li-I'zaz Din Allah** (r. 1021–1036)
Abu Tamim Ma'ad **al-Mustansir bi'llah** (r. 1036–1094)
Abu Mansur Nizar^{§} (elder son)	Abu Abdallah	Abdallah	Isma'il	Abu'l-Qasim Muhammad	Other children	Abu'l-Qasim Ahmad **al-Musta'li bi'llah** (r. 1094–1101)
al-Husayn	Nizari imams (claimed descent)	Abu'l-Maymun Abd al-Majid **al-Hafiz li-Din Allah** (r. 1132–1149)	Abu Ali Mansur **al-Amir bi-Ahkam Allah** (r. 1101–1130)	Ja'far	Other children
Sulayman^{§}	Haydara^{§}	Hasan^{§}	Abu Mansur Isma'il **al-Zafir bi-Amr Allah** (r. 1149–1154)	Yusuf	Other children	Abu'l-Qasim al-Tayyib^{§}
Abu'l-Qasim Isa **al-Fa'iz bi-Nasr Allah** (r. 1154–1160)	Abu Muhammad Abdallah **al-Adid li-Din Allah** (r. 1160–1171)	Tayyibi hidden imams (claimed descent)
Dawud
Sulayman

^{§} denotes designated heirs who did not accede to the throne
denotes ruling Fatimid caliphs (with regnal names in **bold** and regnal dates)

== Sources ==
- Halm, Heinz (1991). Das Reich des Mahdi: Der Aufstieg der Fatimiden [The Empire of the Mahdi: The Rise of the Fatimids] (in German). Munich: C. H. Beck. ISBN 978-3-406-35497-7.
- Halm, Heinz (2003). Die Kalifen von Kairo: Die Fatimiden in Ägypten, 973–1074 [The Caliphs of Cairo: The Fatimids in Egypt, 973–1074] (in German). Munich: C. H. Beck. ISBN 3-406-48654-1.
- Halm, Heinz (2015). "Prinzen, Prinzessinnen, Konkubinen und Eunuchen am fatimidischen Hof" [Princes, Princesses, Concubines and Eunuchs at the Fatimid Court]. In Pomerantz, Maurice A.; Shahin, Aram A. (eds.). The Heritage of Arabo-Islamic Learning. Studies Presented to Wadad Kadi (in German). Leiden and Boston: Brill. pp. 91–110. ISBN 978-90-04-30590-8.
