= Ya'qub ibn Killis =

Egyptian Vizier under the Fatimids from 979 to 991

Abu'l-Faraj Ya'qub ibn Yusuf ibn Killis (Arabic: يعقوب ابن كلس, romanized: Abu'l-Faraj Yaʿqūb ibn Yūsuf ibn Killis, Hebrew: יעקוב אבן כיליס), (c. 930 in Baghdad – 991), commonly known simply by his patronymic surname as Ibn Killis, was a high-ranking official of the Ikhshidids who went on to serve as the first official vizier under the Fatimids from 979 until his death in 991.

Ya'qub ibn Yusuf ibn Killis was born in Baghdad in about 930 in a Jewish family. After his family moved to Syria he came to Egypt in 943 and entered the service of the Regent Kafur. As soon as he became the household and property administrator, he was in charge of the Egyptian state's finances. Despite converting to Islam in 967, he was imprisoned by Kafur's successors after losing their favor. He was able however to purchase his freedom and went to Ifriqiya, where he put himself at the service of the Fatimid Caliph al-Mu'izz.

After the Fatimid conquest of Egypt in 969, Ibn Killis returned to Egypt and was put in charge of the economy, where he was able to regularise the state finances. After the dismissal of Jawhar as-Siqilli in 979 Ya'qub ibn Killis was appointed vizier by al-Aziz, the first holder of this position for the Fatimids, which he held until his death in 991. He was a patron of culture and science.

== Early life ==
Abu al-Farj Ya'qub ibn Yusuf, known as Ibn Killis, was born of an honorable family of Baghdad. By birth he was a Jew, born in 930. At a young age he came with his father to Egypt, where he started his political life at the court of Kafur, the power behind the throne of the Ikhshidid regime. He was very intelligent, hard working and honest. Very soon he secured an important position in the court of Kafur as an expert in economics. In 967, he converted to Islam, by which Kafur was highly pleased and appointed him as his courtier. This aroused the jealousy of his rival, the vizier Ibn al-Furat, who began to seek a way to eliminate him.

In 968 Kafur died and Ibn al-Furat arrested all his companions including Ya'qub ibn Killis. It is said that Ya'qub bribed the jailor and absconded to Ifriqiya, where the Fatimid Caliph al-Mu'izz ruled.

Al-Mu'izz assigned Ya'qub the responsibility of the country's economy. Through his past experiences he carried out his work with great efficiency. Thereafter, at the time of the Fatimid conquest of Egypt, al-Mu'izz deputed him with Jawhar as-Siqilli for the management there. According to another version, Ya'qub accompanied the Caliph al-Mu'izz when he went to Egypt in 972. After the Fatimid takeover of Egypt, Ibn al-Furat continued in office as vizier, but in 974 he resigned and al-Mu'izz handed over the administration to Ibn Killis.

During the last years of the reign of al-Mu'izz, and the first two years of the period of his successor al-Aziz, (975–996), due to toil, honesty and intelligence of Ya'qub ibn Killis, this position became firm and stable, so much so that in 977-78 al-Aziz appointed him as Wazir al-Adjall (Chief Minister). Prior to this, the first four Fatimid caliphs had an assistant called wasta.

During his tenure as vizier, Ya'qub ibn Killis established various departments anew for the administration of the state, promoted agriculture, reformed trade and stabilised the currency, by which the country began to flourish and revenue of provinces increased. In this very period the treasury was so full as never before. In 983/4 he fell from favour, and al-Aziz fined him 20,000 gold dinars, but the cause is unknown. Nevertheless, within a few months he was reinstated to his post.

== Sickness and death ==
Ibn Killis fell seriously ill on 10 January 991. Al-Aziz visited him and said: "O Ya'qub! If your recovery is to be gained through spending wealth then I am prepared to give away the whole wealth of the state. And if your life is saved by sacrificing any life, I am ready to sacrifice my own son". By this it is understood what position Ya'qub ibn Killis held with the Caliph al-Aziz. The sickness began to worsen day by day and on 22 February 991 CE he succumbed.

His death was mourned throughout Egypt. His shroud was decorated with 50 pieces of cloth of which 30 were embroidered with gold thread. According to Ibn Khallikan, 100 poets composed lamentations and every poet earned his reward from the Caliph. In Cairo a place was named the Vizier's Quarter in his honour.

== Educational status ==
With the political sciences Ya'qub bin Killis was also endowed with a thorough knowledge of religion. He was a great scholar and was fond of literature. It is said that he wrote many books in which Mukhtasar-ul-Fiqah' (Risalat al-Waziria) is worth mentioning. This work is on theology and 40 theologians participated in its compilation.

Besides, he was at his palace lecturing every Friday night on different subjects, where judges, theologians, grammarians, traditionalists and poets used to gather to hear him.

At Al-Azhar he gave vent to religious education and upon his instructions a university was established in Jama-e-Azhar, which exists until today.

== Stories of his wealth ==
Ya'qub ibn Killis was an efficient vizier and introduced many reforms, as a result of which the public was not burdened and treasury was full. Al-Aziz, had given him wide powers and he was also drawing a good remuneration from the Treasury with a high position in the government.

Consequently, he was in possession of the force of 4,000 young men. The uniform of his guards was, similar to that of the guards of Hazrat Imam Aziz, that is silky. Ya'qub bin Killis had formed a private force, commander of which was called 'Qaid'. Courts were established for different jobs. There was also a well equipped dispensary in his palace. In the month of Ramadhan besides judges and prominent persons, nominal and general public also used to take advantage of his favour. His annual income was 100,000 dinars, i.e. more than 50,000 guineas. At the time of his death he left property valued forty lakh dinars, this amount was exclusive 200,000 dinars kept aside by him for the dowry of his daughter. He also left a piece of land worth 300,000 dinars. Besides there were 4,000 male and 8,000 female slaves.

== Sources ==
- al-Imad, Leila S. (1990). The Fatimid Vizierate (979-1172). Berlin: Klaus Schwarz Verlag. ISBN 3-922968-82-1., pp. 80–96
- Canard, Marius (1971). "Ibn Killis". In Lewis, B.; Ménage, V. L.; Pellat, Ch. & Schacht, J. (eds.). The Encyclopaedia of Islam, Second Edition. Volume III: H–Iram. Leiden: E. J. Brill. pp. 840–841. OCLC 495469525.
- Cohen, Mark R.; Somekh, Sasson (1990). "In the Court of Yaʿqūb Ibn Killis: A Fragment from the Cairo Genizah". Jewish Quarterly Review. 80 (3/4): 283–314. doi:10.2307/1454972. JSTOR 1454972.
- Saker, Susanna (2003). Der Wille zur Macht: der fatimidische Wesir Ya'qūb ibn Killis (in German). Berlin: Klaus Schwarz Verlag. ISBN 3-87997-312-1.
- Walker, Paul E. (2017). "Ibn Killis". In Fleet, Kate; Krämer, Gudrun; Matringe, Denis; Nawas, John; Rowson, Everett (eds.). Encyclopaedia of Islam (3rd ed.). Brill Online. doi:10.1163/1573-3912_ei3_COM_3087. ISSN 1873-9830.

New title	Vizier of the Fatimid Caliphate; 979–991	Succeeded by Ali ibn Umar al-Addas
