= Ja'far ibn Fallah =

Fatimid military commander (died 971)

- جعفر بن فلاح
- Died: 971 CE; Damascus, Qarmatian state (present-day Syria)
- Children: Ali; Ibrahim; Sulayman; Abdullah
- Relatives: Fallah ibn Marwan (father); Safiyy al-Dawla (grandson); Mahmoud ibn Ibrahim (grandson)
- Military career
- Allegiance: Fatimid Caliphate
- Rank: Commander of the Fatimid army Governor of the Levant (970–971)
- Wars
- Military career
- Conflicts: Fatimid conquest of Egypt; Fatimid conquest of Levant; Capture of Tiberias; Siege of Damascus; Siege of Antioch; First Qarmatian invasion of Egypt; Capture of Damascus (971) †

Ja'far ibn Fallah (Arabic: جعفر بن فلاح) or Abu al-Fadl al-Kutami, was a Fatimid military commander and governor from the Berber Kutama tribe. He led the conquest of Egypt alongside Jawhar, and was later entrusted with commanding the Fatimid army in the conquest of Syria in 969 CE, to wrest the region from Ikhshidid control and Abbasid influence. He captured Damascus, Tripoli, Sidon and vast areas of the Levant, and established a system of governance in the territories he subjugated, and he was the first Fatimid ruler in the Islamic East.

== Biography ==
=== Fatimid conquest of Egypt ===
In summer 969, the troops of the Fatimid Caliphate, under the command of Jawhar al-Siqilli, conquered Egypt from its Ikhshidid rulers. The only resistance was offered by the regiments of the Ikhshidid army barricaded on the Rawdah Island near the capital, Fustat, but the Nile was low and the Fatimids' Kutama Berber troops quickly crossed it and massacred the Ikhshidid troops. Ja'far ibn Fallah was instrumental in this success: he not only led the Fatimid troops that crossed the river, but also, according to al-Maqrizi, captured the boats used to do this from a fleet sent by Ikhshidid loyalists from Lower Egypt.

=== Fatimid conquest of the Levant ===
At the same time, further north, the Byzantine Empire captured Antioch. Seized with the spirit of jihad and aiming to legitimize their rule, the Fatimids used the Byzantine advance on Antioch and the "infidel" threat as a major item in their propaganda aimed towards the newly conquered region, along with promises to restore just government. Jawhar therefore sent Ja'far ibn Fallah to invade Palestine, where the remnants of the Ikhshidids were holding out.

Ibn Fallah defeated and captured the Ikhshidid governor al-Hasan ibn Ubayd Allah ibn Tughj and took Ramla, the capital of the province of Palestine, on 24 May 970. He then moved against Tiberias, held by the ghulam Fatik and his Banu Uqayl Bedouin allies. Fatik was killed through treachery, while Ibn Fallah used other Bedouin tribes, the Banu Murra and the Banu Fazara, to drive the Uqayl north towards Homs. At the news of these events, the Ikhshidid-appointed governor of Damascus, Shamul, surrendered himself to the Fatimids. After Ibn Fallah's Kutama soldiers mistreated and robbed a delegation of leading citizens, the Damascenes resolved to resist and set up a government of their own, under the Abbasid Ibn Abi Ya'la and a certain Muhammad ibn Asuda. The Damascene militia drove off the first detachments of the Fatimid army that appeared before the city walls, but as soon as Ibn Fallah himself with the bulk of his force appeared before the city in November, they were driven back behind the city walls, and offered to surrender. In stark contrast to the leniency Jawhar had shown to Fustat, Ibn Fallah imposed humiliating terms on Damascus, demanding that the women come out and let their hair down in the dust. During the takeover of the city, the Kutama pillaged the markets and clashed with the populace for three days, after which Ibn Fallah executed several prominent citizens. This quietened the situation for the time being, and Ibn Fallah secured Damascus by erecting a citadel in the city, but it left a legacy of hatred towards the Fatimids and their Berber troops in the city.

=== Qarmatian invasion and death ===
Almost as soon as Damascus submitted, Ibn Fallah entrusted one of his ghulams, named Futuh ("Victories"), to carry out the promised jihad against the Byzantines. Futuh assembled a large army of Kutama, strengthened with levies from Palestine and southern Syria, and moved to besiege Antioch in December 970. The city resisted with success, and although Ibn Fallah sent reinforcements, they were unable to take it. In spring, a Byzantine relief army defeated a detachment of the Fatimid troops, forcing the Fatimids to raise the siege and withdraw. At the same time, Ibn Fallah faced an invasion by the Qarmatians. The Damascene leader Muhammad ibn Asuda, along with the Uqayli chieftain Zalim ibn Mawhub, had sought refuge with the Qarmatians of the Syrian Desert, and urged them to attack the Fatimids. The Qarmatians were all the more responsive because the Fatimids had stopped the Ikhshidid practice of paying them a tribute of some 300,000 gold dinars a year in exchange for peace. The Qarmatians mounted a major retaliatory expedition that involved a broad coalition of the region's powers: not only were the Qarmatians of Syria aided by their co-religionists of Bahrayn, but they also received aid from the Buyid ruler of Baghdad, Izz al-Dawla, and the Hamdanids of Mosul. They were also joined by former Ikhshidid ghulams, the Bedouin of the Banu Kilab tribe, and the Uqayli followers of Zalim. Unwisely, Ibn Fallah chose to confront them in the open desert, where he was defeated and killed in battle in August 971. Muhammad ibn Asuda cut off his head in revenge at the death of his brother, who had been among the Damascene notables executed by Ibn Fallah.

This defeat led to the near total collapse of Fatimid control in southern Syria and Palestine, and the Qarmatian invasion of Egypt. The Fatimids were victorious in a battle before Fustat, however, and eventually managed to drive the Qarmatians out of Syria and restore their control over the restive province.

His son Sulayman also became a senior Fatimid commander, serving from the late 970s until the late 990s, as did his brother Ibrahim. Another brother, Ali, also became a senior commander at the turn of the 11th century, and was honoured with the laqab of Qutb al-Dawla ("Axis of the Realm") for his services against Mufarrij ibn Daghfal ibn al-Jarrah and his Bedouin.

== Sources ==
- Bianquis, Thierry (1998). "Autonomous Egypt from Ibn Ṭūlūn to Kāfūr, 868–969". In Petry, Carl F. (ed.). The Cambridge History of Egypt: Islamic Egypt, 640–1517. Vol. 1. Cambridge: Cambridge University Press. pp. 86–119. ISBN 0-521-47137-0.
- Brett, Michael (2001). The Rise of the Fatimids: The World of the Mediterranean and the Middle East in the Fourth Century of the Hijra, Tenth Century CE. The Medieval Mediterranean. Vol. 30. Leiden: BRILL. ISBN 9004117415.
- Gil, Moshe (1997) [1983]. A History of Palestine, 634–1099. Translated by Ethel Broido. Cambridge: Cambridge University Press. ISBN 0-521-59984-9.
- Kennedy, Hugh (2004) [1986]. The Prophet and the Age of the Caliphates: The Islamic Near East from the 6th to the 11th Century (Second ed.). Harlow: Longman. ISBN 978-0-582-40525-7.
- Lev, Yaacov (1979). "The Fāṭimid Conquest of Egypt — Military Political and Social Aspects". Israel Oriental Studies. 9: 315–328. ISSN 0334-4401.
- Walker, Paul E. (1972). "A Byzantine victory over the Fatimids at Alexandretta (971)". Byzantion: Revue internationale des études byzantines. 42. Brussels: 431–440. ISSN 0378-2506.
