= Al-Mu'izz li-Din Allah =

Fatimid caliph from 953 to 975

al-Mu'izz li-Din Allah المعز لدين الله
- Caliph; Amir al-Mu'minīn
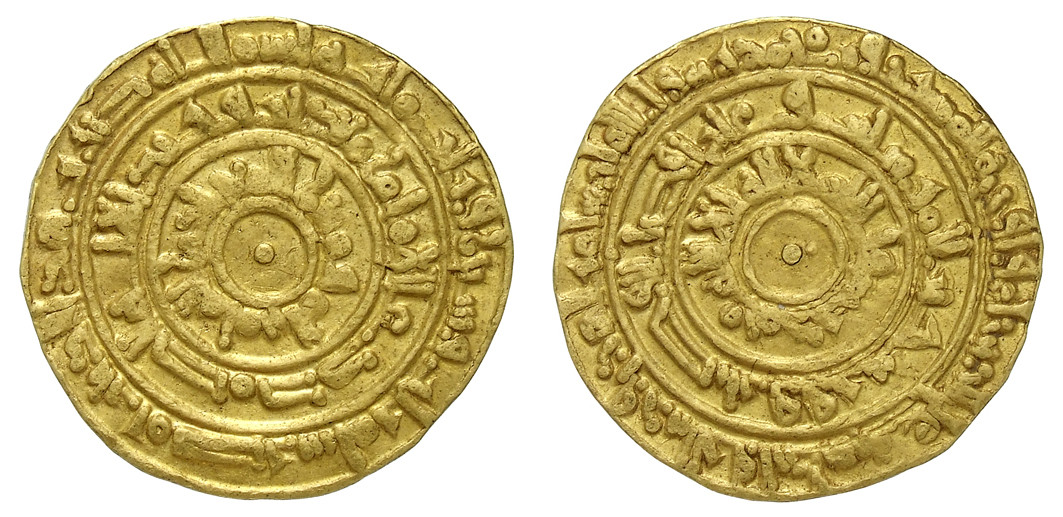
- Gold dinar of al-Mu'izz, minted in Cairo, 973 AD

Imam–Caliph of the Fatimid Caliphate
- Reign: 19 March 953 – 18 December 975
- Predecessor: al-Mansur bi-Nasr Allah
- Successor: al-Aziz Billah
- Born: 26 September 931; Mahdia, Fatimid Caliphate
- Died: 18 December 975 (aged 44)
- Spouse: Durzan
- Issue: Tamim; Abdallah; al-Aziz Billah; Sitt al-Mulk; Rashida; Abda; several children
Names
- Kunya: Abu Tamim; Given name: Ma'ad; Laqab: al-Mu'izz li-Din Allah
- Dynasty: Fatimid
- Father: al-Mansur bi-Nasr Allah
- Religion: Isma'ili Shia Islam

Abu Tamim Ma'ad al-Mu'izz li-Din Allah (Arabic: أبو تميم معد المعزّ لدين الله, romanized: Abū Tamīm Maʿad al-Muʿizz li-Dīn Allāh, lit. 'Glorifier of the Religion of God'; 26 September 932 – 19 December 975) was the fourth Fatimid caliph and the 14th Ismaili imam, reigning from 953 to 975. It was during his caliphate that the center of power of the Fatimid dynasty was moved from Ifriqiya (modern Tunisia) to Egypt. The Fatimids founded the city of Cairo (al-Qāhirah, "the Victorious") in 969 as the new capital of the Fatimid Caliphate in Egypt during his reign. The Al-Mu'izz Street in Cairo is named after him, it is considered to be the most important historical street in Cairo and it includes monumental buildings from the Fatimid era as well as the later Ayyubid, Memluk and Ottoman eras.

== Political career ==
After the Fatimids, under the third caliph, al-Mansur bi-Nasr Allah (r. 946–953), had defeated the rebellion of Abu Yazid, they began, under his son al-Mu'izz, to turn their attentions back to their ambition of establishing their caliphate throughout the Islamic world and overthrowing the Abbasids. Although the Fatimids were primarily concerned with Egypt and the Near East, there were nevertheless campaigns fought in the Maghreb and against the Umayyads of Spain. At the same time, Fatimid raids on Italy enabled naval superiority in the Western Mediterranean to be affirmed, at the expense of Byzantium, even capturing Sicily for a period of time.

The way to Egypt was then clear for the Fatimids, the more so given the state of crisis that the incumbent Ikhshidid dynasty found itself in and the inability of the Abbasids to counterattack. The territory fell to the Fatimids in 969 without any great resistance. After he had secured his position, al-Mu'izz transferred the royal residence from Al-Mansuriya to the newly founded city of Qāhirat al-Muʿizz "al-Mu'izz's Victory", i.e., Cairo, thereby shifting the centre of gravity of the Fatimid realm eastwards. In Egypt, several attacks by the Carmathians had to be fought off (972–974) before the restructuring of state finances under Yaqub ibn Killis could be embarked upon. Al-Mu'izz was succeeded by his son Al-Aziz (975–996).

== Cultural achievements ==
Al-Mu'izz was renowned for his tolerance of other religions, and was popular among his Jewish and Christian subjects. He is also credited for having commissioned the invention of the first fountain pen, when in 953, he demanded a pen which would not stain his hands or clothes, and was provided with a pen which held ink in a reservoir. As recorded by Qadi al-Nu'man al-Tamimi (d. 974) in his Kitāb al-Majālis wa 'l-musayarāt, al-Mu'izz commissioned the construction of the pen instructing:

…not more than a few days passed before the craftsman, to whom the construction of this contrivance had been described, brought in the pen, fashioned from gold. He then filled it with ink and wrote with it, and it really did write. The pen released a little more ink than was necessary. Hence al-Mu'izz ordered that it should be adjusted slightly, and he did this. He brought forward the pen and behold, it turned out to be a pen which can be turned upside down in the hand and tipped from side to side, and no trace of ink appears from it. When a secretary takes up the pen and writes with it, he is able to write in the most elegant script that could possibly be desired; then, when he lifts the pen off the sheet of writing material, it holds in the ink. I observed that it was a wonderful piece of work, the like of which I had never imagined I would ever see.

Fatimid literature rose to a degree of prominence in the period of al-Mu'izz with the emergence of skilled poets like Ibn Hani, who was often compared to al-Mutanabbi, and hailed as the Mutanabbi of the West. Da'a'im al-Islam, the canon law of the Fatimid Caliphate, was completed under al-Mu'izz.

== Relationship with Coptic Christians ==
Coptic Christians were allowed a large degree of freedom under al-Mu'izz. Copts were among those appointed to the highest offices of the empire and were allowed to freely practice their religion. Under Al-Mu'izz, the viceroy of Syria was Quzman Ibn Nima, a Copt who remained a Christian. The Nayrouz festival, the celebration of the Coptic New Year, was permitted, though prohibitions on some of the activities, such as fire illumination and water splashing, were instituted.

The relationship between al-Mu'izz and the Copts of Egypt has been the subject of a number of legends written later by Coptic Christians. One such legend involves al-Mu'izz challenging Pope Abraham of Alexandria to move the Mokattam mountain in Cairo, recalling a verse in the Gospel of Matthew which says:

If ye have faith as a grain of mustard seed, ye shall say unto this mountain, Remove hence to yonder place; and it shall remove; and nothing shall be impossible unto you.

According to Coptic sources, Pope Abraham of Alexandria ordered the Coptic community to keep vigil and to pray for three days and nights. On the third night, Pope Abraham had a dream in which Mary directed him to search for Simon the Tanner. The legend continues that with the prayers of the Coptic community, led by the Pope and Simon, the Mokattam mountain moved. This story is recounted in the book History of the Patriarchs of Alexandria, written by Severus Ibn al-Muqaffa.

Later Coptic sources would further claim that this miracle led al-Mu'izz to convert to Christianity, and that he was baptized at the church of Saint Mercurius in Cairo in a baptismal font that continues to exist to this day, known today as the "Sultan's Baptistry". According to this legend al-Mu'izz abdicated the throne in favor of his son, and spent the rest of his life in a monastery. This story is rejected by Muslim historians such as Ahmad Zaki Pasha and Muhammad Abdullah Enan.

== Family ==
Sources differ on al-Mu'izz's consorts. According to one version, he married a cousin of his, who gave him two sons, including his successor al-Aziz. Other sources report that his main consort (al-Sayyida al-Mu'iziyya), and mother of al-Aziz, was a slave-girl (jarya) from Mahdia named Durzan, who due to her beautiful singing voice (although this may simply reflect a common stereotype about jaryas) was nicknamed taghrīd ("twittering"). Al-Mu'izz had several other sons, but two are known by name: Tamim and Abdallah, who was the designated heir-apparent but died before his father. He also had seven daughters, of whom three are known with some detail: Sitt al-Malik, Rashida, and Abda. The last two died in their nineties in 1050, leaving behind enormous fortunes.

== See also ==
- List of rulers of Egypt
- List of Ismaili imams
- List of Shi'a Muslims
- Al-Khalifa District
- Ali ibn Muhammad al-Iyadi

== Sources ==
- Brett, Michael (2001). The Rise of the Fatimids: The World of the Mediterranean and the Middle East in the Fourth Century of the Hijra, Tenth Century CE. The Medieval Mediterranean. Vol. 30. Leiden, Boston, Köln: Brill. ISBN 90-04-11741-5.
- Cortese, Delia; Calderini, Simonetta (2006). Women and the Fatimids in the World of Islam. Edinburgh: Edinburgh University Press. ISBN 0-7486-1733-7.
- Dachraoui, F. (1993). "al-Muʿizz li-Dīn Allāh". In Bosworth, C. E.; van Donzel, E.; Heinrichs, W. P. & Pellat, Ch. (eds.). The Encyclopaedia of Islam, Second Edition. Volume VII: Mif–Naz. Leiden: E. J. Brill. pp. 485–489. doi:10.1163/1573-3912_islam_SIM_5447. ISBN 978-90-04-09419-2.
- Halm, Heinz (1991). Das Reich des Mahdi: Der Aufstieg der Fatimiden [The Empire of the Mahdi: The Rise of the Fatimids] (in German). Munich: C. H. Beck. ISBN 978-3-406-35497-7.
- Halm, Heinz (2003). Die Kalifen von Kairo: Die Fatimiden in Ägypten, 973–1074 [The Caliphs of Cairo: The Fatimids in Egypt, 973–1074] (in German). Munich: C. H. Beck. ISBN 3-406-48654-1.
- Jiwa, Shainool, ed. (2009). Towards a Shi'i Mediterranean Empire: Fatimid Egypt and the Founding of Cairo. The Reign of Imam-Caliph al-Muʿizz, from al-Maqrīzī's Ittiʿāẓ al-ḥunafāʾ. London and New York: I.B. Tauris. ISBN 978-0-8577-1742-9.
- Jiwa, Shainool (2013). The Founder of Cairo: The Fatimid Imam-Caliph al-Mu'izz and his Era. London and New York: I.B. Tauris. ISBN 978-0-8577-2223-2.
- Jad Hatem, Le Traité christologique du Calife al-Mu‘izz, le druzisme et le nusayrisme, Paris, Éd. du Cygne, 2013

al-Mu'izz li-Din Allah Fatimid dynasty Born: 26 September 931 Died: 21 December 975
Regnal titles
Preceded by al-Mansur bi-Nasr Allah	Fatimid Caliph; 19 March 953 – 21 December 975	Succeeded by al-Aziz Billah
Shia Islam titles
Preceded by al-Mansur bi-Nasr Allah	14th Isma'ili Imam; 19 March 953 – 21 December 975	Succeeded by al-Aziz Billah
