= Moshe Gil =

Israeli historian (1921–2014)

- משה גיל
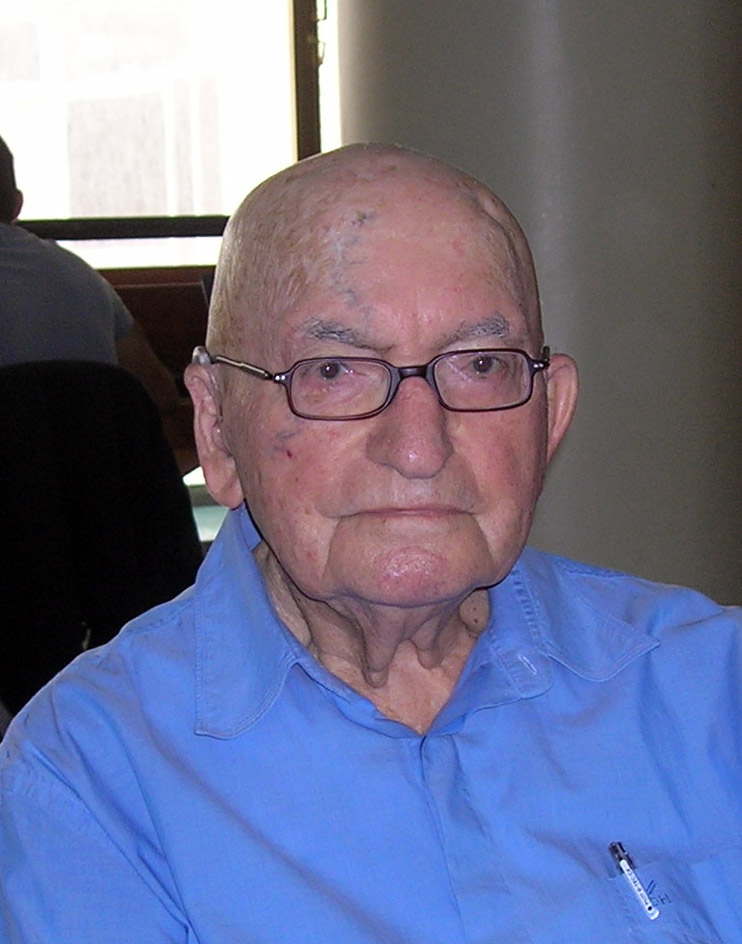
- Professor Moshe Gil, 2011
- Born: February 8, 1921; Białystok, Poland
- Died: January 23, 2014 (aged 92); Tel Aviv, Israel
- Scientific career
- Fields: History
- Workplaces: Tel Aviv University

Moshe Gil (Hebrew: משה גיל; February 8, 1921 – January 23, 2014) was an Israeli historian.

== Academic career ==
Moshe Gil specialized in the historical interaction between Islam and the Jews, including the history of Palestine under Islamic rule, the institution of the Exilarchate, and Jewish merchants such as the Radhanites. Gil was professor emeritus of the Chaim Rosenberg School of Jewish Studies at Tel Aviv University and held the Joseph and Ceil Mazer Chair in the History of the Jews in Muslim Lands.

== Awards ==
In 1998, Gil was awarded the Israel Prize, for Land of Israel studies, primarily for his work analyzing some 846 document fragments from the Cairo Genizah and for his work in documenting the role of Jewish merchants in the development of medieval society.

== Published works ==
- (1997) "The Babylonian Encounter and the Exilarchic House in the Light of Cairo Geniza Documents and Parallel Arab Sources." (Conference Paper in Proceedings: Judaeo-Arabic studies proceedings of the Founding Conference of the Society for Judaeo Arabic Studies.)
- (1995) "The Exilarchate." (Conference Paper in Proceedings : The Jews of medieval Islam: Community, society, and identity: proceedings of an international conference held by the Institute of Jewish Studies, University College London, 1992 )
- (1992) A history of Palestine, 634-1099. Cambridge and New York: Cambridge University Press.
- (1987) "The Medinan Opposition to the Prophet". (Journal Article in Jerusalem Studies in Arabic and Islam.)
- (1987) Review of "Khazarian Hebrew Documents of the Tenth Century" by Golb and Pritsak (Book Review in Journal of Near Eastern studies.)
- (1984) "The Origin of the Jews of Yathrib." (Journal Article in Jerusalem studies in Arabic and Islam.)
- (1976) Documents of the Jewish pious foundations from the Cairo Geniza. Leiden: Brill. (Book, Edited, Vol. 12 in a series/set )
- (1974) "The Radhanite Merchants and the Land of Radhanite." (Journal Article in Journal of the economic and social history of the Orient.)
- (1974) "The Constitution of Medina: A Reconsideration" (Journal Article in Israel oriental studies.)

== See also ==
- List of Israel Prize recipients
