= Sharifate of Mecca =

967–1916 semi-sovereign state in the Arabian Peninsula

Sharifate of Mecca شَرافَة مَكَّة
- 967–1916
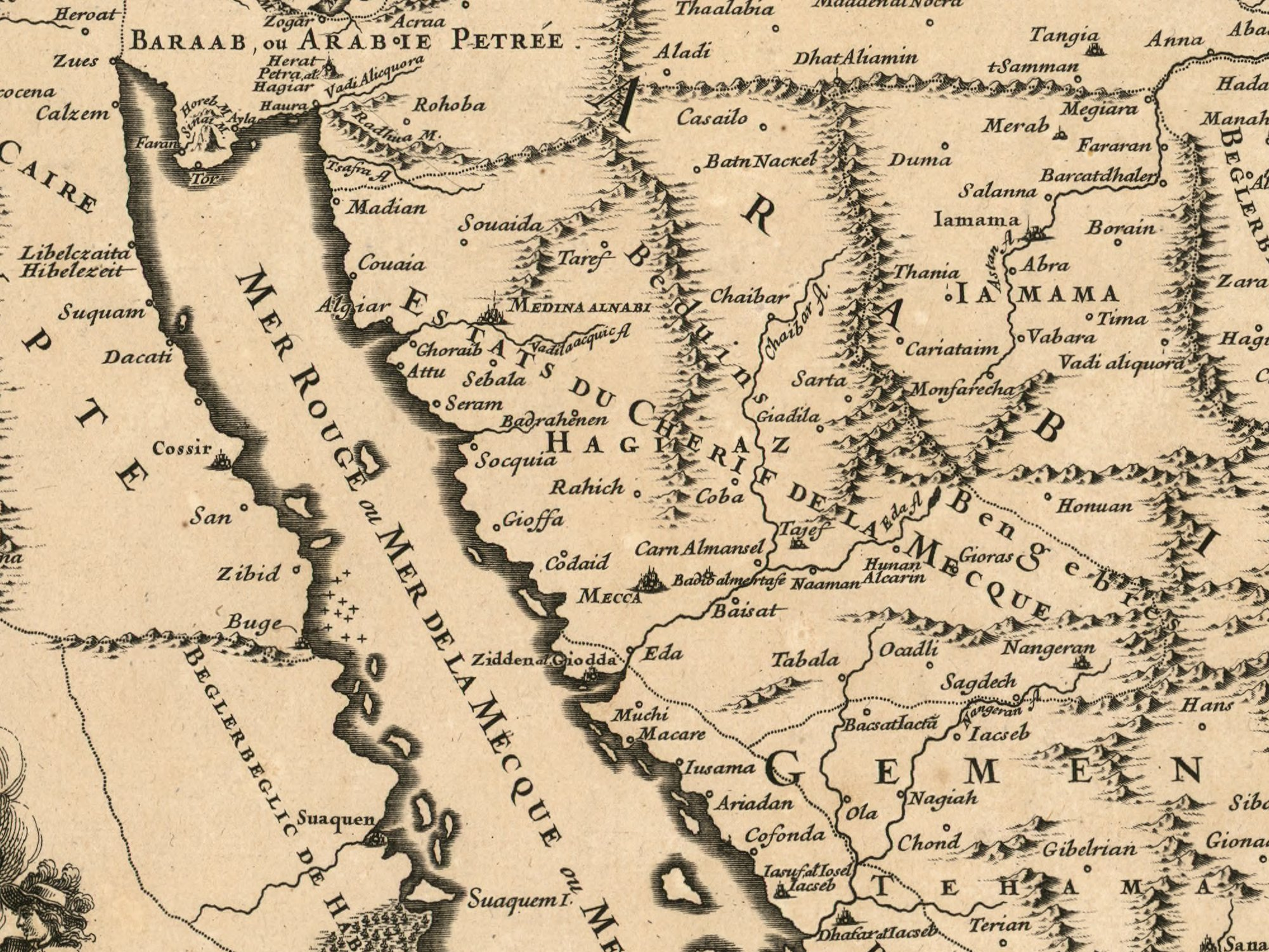
- A 1695 map of the Sharifate of Mecca
- Status: under Abbasid Caliphate (967–969); Fatimid Caliphate (969–1171); Abbasid Caliphate (1171–1517): (Ayyubids domain (1171–1254)) (Mamluks domain (1254–1517)); Ottoman Caliphate (1517–1803); Emirate of Diriyah (1803–1813); Ottoman Caliphate (1813–1916)
- Capital: Mecca
- Official languages: Arabic
- Religion: Zaydi Islam; Sunni Islam (later)
- Sharif
  - 967–980: Ja'far ibn Muhammad
  - 1916: Hussein bin Ali
- Today part of: Saudi Arabia

The Sharifate of Mecca (Arabic: شَرافَة مَكَّة, romanised: Sharāfat Makka) or Emirate of Mecca was a state, semi-sovereign for much of its existence, ruled by the Sharif of Mecca. A sharif is a descendant of Hasan ibn Ali, Muhammad's grandson. In Western sources, the prince of Mecca was known as Grand Sherif, but Arabs have always used the appellation "Emir".

The Sharifate existed from about 967 to 1916, when it became the Kingdom of Hejaz. From 1201, the descendants of the Sharifian patriarch Qatada ruled over Mecca, Medina and the Tihamah in unbroken succession until 1925. Originally a Zaydi Shi'ite emirate, the Hasanid Sharifs converted to the Shafi'i rite of Sunni Islam in the late Mamluk or early Ottoman period.

Their Husaynid kin who traditionally ruled over Medina professed Twelver Shi'ism. Both the Hasanid sharifs in Mecca and Husaynid sharifs in Medina converted to Sunnism in the Mamluk period, however, Mamluk and Ottoman sources hint towards continued Shia sympathies from among the ruling Hasanids and Husaynids after their conversion to Sunnism. The Egyptian encyclopedist al-Qalqashandi described it as a Bedouin state, in that being similar to its neighbor and rival in the north, the Sharifate of Medina.

== Pre-Ottoman history ==
Originally, the sharifs of Mecca had generally avoided involvement in public life. This situation changed in the second half of the 10th century, with the rise of the Qarmatian sect. The Qarmatians directed tribal raids towards Iraq, Syria and much of Arabia, interrupting the flux of pilgrims to Mecca.

In 930, Qaramita raiders sacked Mecca, and stole the holy Black Stone from the Kaaba, gravely embarrassing the Abbasid caliph in Baghdad. The Qarmatians returned the Black Stone in 951 and came to an accommodation with Baghdad, ceasing their attacks on the pilgrim caravans in exchange for money to protect them, but the extension of Qarmatian power in the middle of the 9th century effectively severed the routes between Iraq and Mecca.

As a result, the holy cities turned towards Egypt, from which they received most of their grain, for support; during the rule of Abu al-Misk Kafur, nominally an Abbasid vassal but de facto independent, even the Abbasid caliphal prerogative of sending a ceremonial crown, the shamsa, to be hanged before the Kaaba, was usurped by the Egyptian ruler.

As a measure to enhance the safety of the pilgrims he chose one of the sharifs of Mecca, and installed him as emir of Mecca in about 964. The Egyptian suzerainty over the Muslim holy places was solidified after the Fatimid conquest of Egypt in 969, when the Fatimid caliphs restored the safety of the Hajj routes and sent annually rich gifts to the sharifs of the Hejaz.

In 1012, the Emir of Mecca Abu'l-Futuh al-Hasan declared himself caliph, but he was persuaded to give up his title in the same year. The first Sulayhid ruler conquered the whole of Yemen in 1062, and proceeded northwards to occupy the Hejaz. For a time, they appointed the Emirs of Mecca. As Sunni power began to revive after 1058, the Meccan emirs maintained an ambiguous position between the Fatimids and the Seljuks of Isfahan. After Saladin overthrew the Fatimids in 1171, the Ayyubids aspired to establishing their sovereignty over Mecca. Their constant dynastic disputes, however, led to a period free of external interferences in the Hejaz.

By circa 1200, a sharif by the name of Qatadah ibn Idris seized power and was recognised as Emir by the Ayyubid sultan. He became the first of a dynasty, the Banu Qatadah, that held the emirate until it was abolished in 1925. The Mamluk Sultanate succeeded in taking over Hejaz, and made it a regular province of their empire after 1350.

Jeddah became a base of the Mamluks for their operations in the Red Sea and the Indian Ocean, leading it to replace Yanbu as the main maritime trade centre on the Hejaz coast. By playing off members of the sharifian house against one another, the Mamluks managed to achieve a high degree of control over Mecca.

== Ottoman era ==
During the Ottoman period the Emirate was not hereditary, and owed its succession to direct nomination by the Ottoman Porte. A dual system of government existed over Mecca for much of this period. Ruling authority was shared between the Emir, a member of the ashraf or descendants of Muhammad, and the Ottoman wāli or governor. This system continued until the Arab Revolt of 1916. Apart from the Emirs of Mecca, Ottoman administration in the Hejaz was first at the hands of the Governor of Egypt and then the Governors of Jeddah. The Eyalet of Jeddah was later transformed into the Hejaz Vilayet, with a governor in Mecca.

For much of the 19th century, the northernmost place of the Emirate was Al-'Ula, while the southern limit was usually Al Lith, and sometimes Al Qunfudhah; to the east, it never stretched further than the Khaybar oasis. Mecca, Medina and Jeddah were its largest cities. Some of the population of these cities consisted of non-Arab Muslims, including Bukharis, Javanese, Indians, Afghans, and Central Asians.

=== Early period ===
The western region was formerly under the Mamluk Sultanate until its conquest by the Ottomans in 1517. In the same year, Sharif Barakat of Mecca acknowledged the Ottoman Sultan as Caliph. When the Sharifs accepted Ottoman sovereignty, the Sultan confirmed them in their position as rulers of Mecca. Ottoman authority was only indirect, as the arrangement left real power with the Emir. The Sultan assumed the title of Hâdimü’l-Haremeyni’ş-Şerifeyn ("Custodian of the Two Holy Mosques").

In 1630, a flood swept Mecca, almost completely destroying the Kaaba. It was restored by 1636. In 1680, about 100 people drowned in another flood in Mecca.

Initially, the Ottomans administered Mecca as part of the Eyalet of Egypt. The Emirs were appointed by the Sultan, taking into consideration the choice of the sharifs, as well as the opinions of the Wālis of Egypt, Damascus, and Jeddah (after it was established), as well as that of the qadi of Mecca. The emir of Mecca was always a Hashemite descended from the family of Muhammad. This situation was ended in 1803, when fundamentalist Wahhabis deposed the ruling Emir of Mecca, Ghalib ibn Musa'id.

=== Saudi invasion of Hejaz (1802–1806) ===
The Saudis started to be a threat on the Hejaz from the 1750s onwards. Subscribing to the Salafi–Wahhabi creed, the religious establishment of the Saudis rose as a religious movement in Diriyah in the Najd in 1744–1745. Their doctrine found few sympathisers in the Hejaz, and the Mufti of Mecca pronounced them heretics. They were able to take the two holy cities in 1801. In 1803 the Wahhabis, led by Abdulaziz Al Saud, attacked Mecca. Sharif Ghalib fled to Jeddah, which was besieged shortly thereafter. Sharif Ghalib was sent back to Mecca as a Saudi vassal.

=== Ottoman recapture of Hejaz (1811–1814) ===
First Tusun Pasha led the army in 1811 and occupied Medina in 1812 and Mecca in 1813. After his death Ibrahim Pasha, who had accompanied Muhammad Ali's personal visit to the Hejaz in 1814, took over after lagging success with repeated Saudi resistance and managed to push the Wahhabis back into the Nejd by 1818. Upon the news of the victory, Mahmud II appointed İbrahim Pasha governor of Jeddah and Habesh. He was the nominal ruler of Hejaz on behalf of the Ottomans from 1811 to 1840.The 1840 Convention of London forced Muhammad Ali to pull out from the Hejaz.

=== Vilayet of Hejaz ===
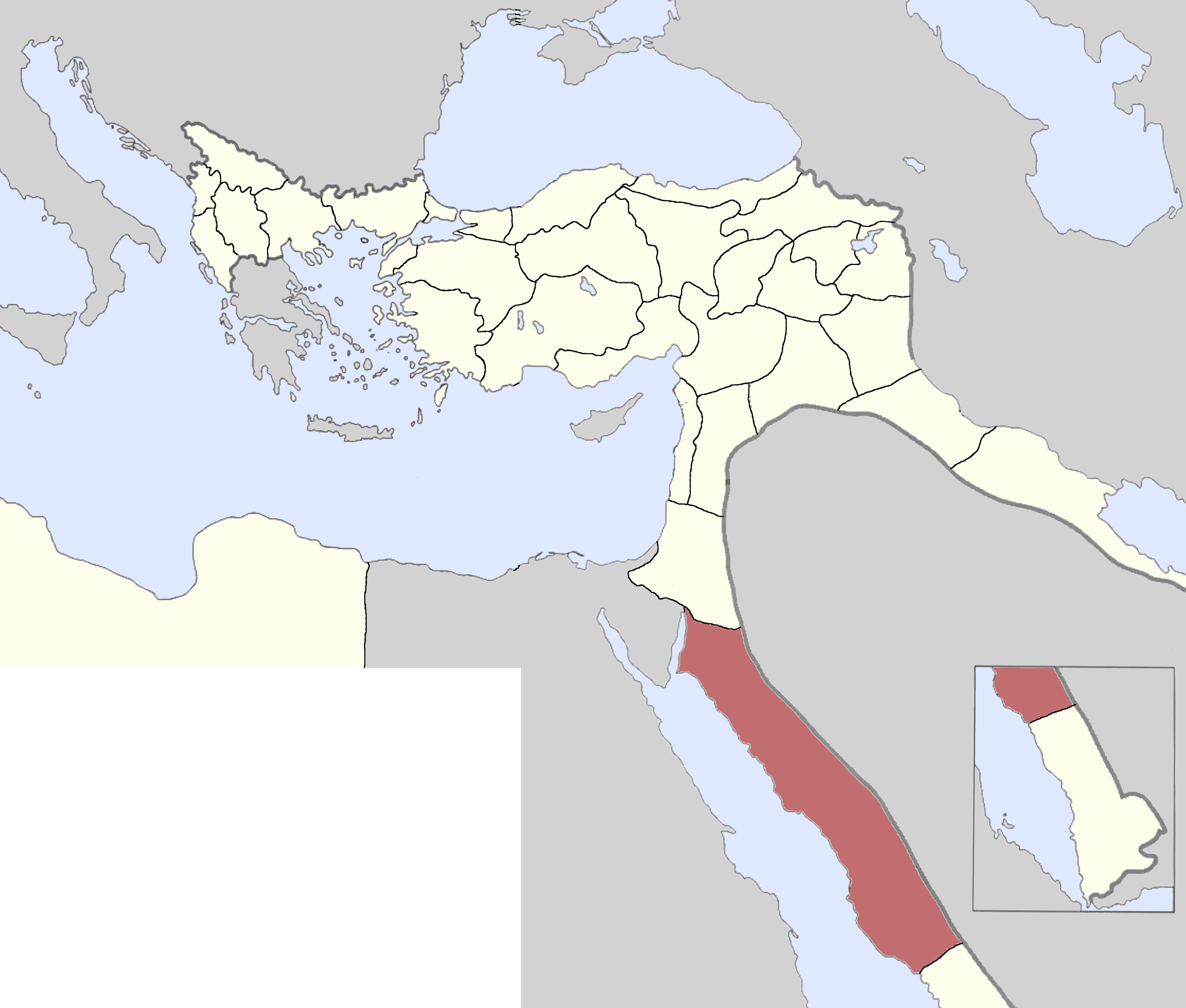
After 1872, the Sharifate was coterminous with the Hejaz Vilayet.

After the Hejaz was restored to the Ottomans, the provincial administration was restructured, and it was organised as the Vilayet of Hejaz. This led to the creation of two parallel political and administrative bodies: the Emirate and the Vilayet. After the Governor started to reside in Mecca, the Vilayet in a way took the Emirate into its jurisdiction, leading to a situation of dual government.

The reform provided for the loss of the near-autonomy of the Emir, leading to a conflict between Emir and wāli that lasted for the rest of the 19th century. Even then, the Emir of Mecca was not relegated to a position where he would be subordinate to the wāli. The Emirs of Mecca continued to have a say in the administration of the Hejaz alongside the governors. The two had an uneasy parallel coexistence: while ruling over the same geography, they divided authority in a complex way, leading to a continuous negotiation, conflict or cooperation between them.

As early as the 1880s, there was talk of British occupation of the Hejaz with the support of the sharifs. The British also challenged the Sultan's caliphate by claiming that Britain should appoint the Emir, as it ruled over four times as many Muslims as the Ottomans.

== Kingdom of Hejaz ==
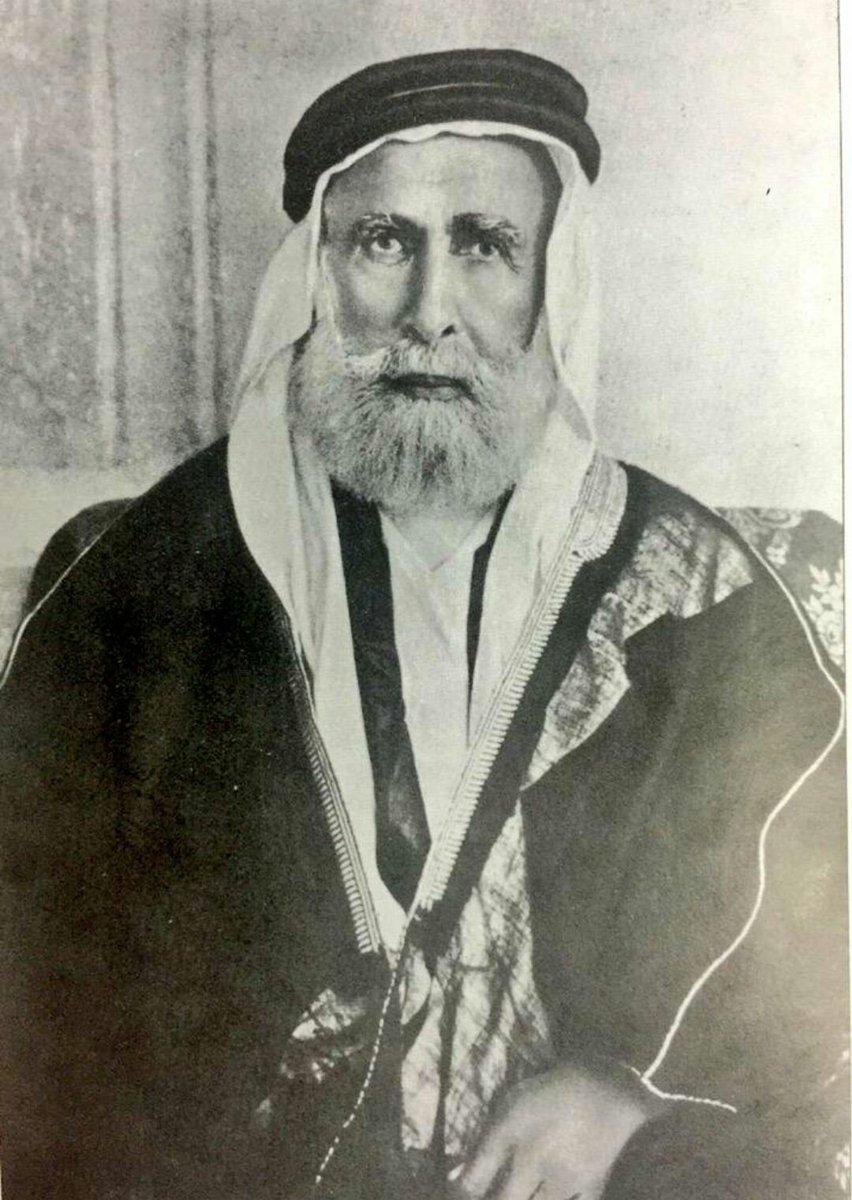
Hussein bin Ali, the Sharif and Emir of Mecca from 1908 to 1924 and King of the Hejaz from 1916 to 1924.

Hussein bin Ali, the Sharif and Emir of Mecca from 1908, enthroned himself as King of the Hejaz after proclaiming the Great Arab Revolt against the Ottoman Empire, and continued to hold both of the offices of Sharif and King from 1916 to 1924. At the end of his reign he also briefly laid claim to the office of Sharifian Caliph; he was a 37th-generation direct descendant of Muhammad, as he belongs to the Hashemite family. A member of the Dhawu Awn clan (Banu Hashim) from the Qatadid emirs of Mecca, he was perceived to have rebellious inclinations and in 1893 was summoned to Istanbul, where he was kept on the Council of State.

In 1908, in the aftermath of the Young Turk Revolution, he was appointed Emir of Mecca by the Ottoman sultan Abdul Hamid II. In 1916, with the promise of British support for Arab independence, he proclaimed the Great Arab Revolt against the Ottoman Empire, accusing the Committee of Union and Progress of violating tenets of Islam and limiting the power of the sultan-caliph. Shortly after the outbreak of the revolt, Hussein declared himself "King of the Arab Countries". However, his pan-Arab aspirations were not accepted by the Allies, who recognized him only as King of the Hejaz.

In the aftermath of World War I, Hussein refused to ratify the Treaty of Versailles, in protest at the Balfour Declaration and the establishment of British and French mandates in Syria, Iraq, and Palestine. He later refused to sign the Anglo-Hashemite Treaty and thus deprived himself of British support when his kingdom was attacked by Ibn Saud. After the Kingdom of Hejaz was invaded by the Al Saud-Wahhabi armies of the Ikhwan, on 23 December 1925 Hussein surrendered to the Saudis, bringing both the Kingdom of Hejaz and the Sharifate of Mecca to an end.

== List of Sharifs ==
Partial list of Sharifs of Mecca:

- Muhammad Abu'l-Ja'far al-Thalab (967–980)
- Isa ibn Ja'far (976/977–994)
- Abu'l-Futuh al-Hasan ibn Ja'far (994–1010)
- Shukr al-Din (1010–1012)
- Abu Tayeb Daoud bin Abdul Rahman (1012–1039)
- Muhammad ibn Abdul Rahman (1039–1048)
- Hamzah ibn Wahas (1058–1062)
- Abu Hashim Muhammad ibn Ja'far (1063–1094)
- Qasim ibn Abi Hashim (1094 – 1123/24)
- Fulaytah ibn Qasim (1123/24 – Jun/Jul 1133)
- Hashim ibn Fulaytah (1133–1155)
- Qasim ibn Hashim (1155–1161)
- Isa ibn Fulaytah (1161 – Aug/Sep 1162)
- Qasim ibn Hashim (Aug/Sep 1162)
- Isa ibn Fulaytah (Aug/Sep 1162 – c. 30 Sep 1170)
- Malik ibn Fulaytah (? – ?)
- Isa ibn Fulaytah (c. 30 Sep 1170 – c. 5 March 1175)
- Da'ud ibn Isa (c. 5 Mar 1175 – c. 5 Feb 1176)
- Mukaththir ibn Isa (c. 5 Feb 1176 – c. 3 Jul 1176)
- Da'ud ibn Isa (Jul 1176 – 1176/77)
- Mukaththir ibn Isa (1176/77 – ?)
- Da'ud ibn Isa (? – 1191/92)
- Mukaththir ibn Isa (1191/92 – 1201)
- Qatada ibn Idris al-Alawi al-Hasani (1201–1220)
- Ibn Qatada al-Hashimi (1220–1241)
- al-Hassan abu'l-Sa'd (1241–1254)
- Muhammed Abu'l-Nubaj (1254–1301)
- Rumaitha Abu'l-Rada (1301–1346)
- Aljan Abu'l-Sarjah (1346–1375)
- Gap
- al-Hassan II (1394–1425)
- Barakat I (1425–1455)
- Malik al-Adil Muhammad (III) ibn Barakat (1455–1497)
- Barakat (II) ibn Muhammad (1497–1525)
- Muhammad Abu Numay (II) Nazim al-Din (1525–1583)
- Al-Hasan (III) ibn Muhammad Abu Numay (1583–1601)
- Idris (II) Abu 'Aun ibn Hasan (1601–1610)
- Muhsin (I) ibn Hussein (1610–1628)
- Ahmad ibn Abu Talib al-Hasan (1628–1629)
- Masud (I) ibn Idris (1629–1630)
- Abdullah (I) ibn Hasan (1630–1631)
- Zeid ibn Muhsin (1631–1666)
- Joint government of Saad ibn Zeid (1666–1672); Ahmad ibn Zeid (1669–1671); Muhsin ibn Ahmad (1667–1668); Hamud ibn Abdullah ibn Hasan (1670)
- Barakat (III) ibn Muhammad (1672–1682)
- Ibrahim ibn Muhammad (1682)
- Said (I) ibn Barakat (1682–1683)
- Ahmad ibn Zeid (1684–1688)
- Joint government of Ahmad ibn Ghalib (1688–1690) and Muhsin ibn Ahmad (1689–1690)
- Muhsin (II) ibn Hussein (1690–1691)
- Said (II) ibn Saad (1691–1694)
- Saad ibn Zeid (1693–1694)
- Abdullah (II) ibn Hashim (1694)
- Saad ibn Zeid (1694–1702)
- Said (II) ibn Saad (1702–1704)
- Abdul Muhsin ibn Ahmad (1704)
- Abdul Karim ibn Muhammad (1704–1705)
- Said (II) ibn Saad (1705)
- Abdul Karim ibn Muhammad (1705–1711)
- Said (II) ibn Saad (1711–1717)
- Abdullah (III) ibn Said (1717–1718)
- Ali ibn Said (1718)
- Yahya (I) ibn Barakat (1718–1719)
- Mubarak ibn Ahmad (1720–1722)
- Barakat ibn Yahya (1722–1723)
- Mubarak ibn Ahmad (1723–1724)
- Abdullah (III) ibn Said (1724–1731)
- Muhammad ibn Abdullah (1731–1732)
- Masud ibn Said (1732–1733)
- Muhammad ibn Abdullah (1733–1734)
- Masud ibn Said (1734–1752)
- Masaad ibn Said (II) (1752–1759)
- Jaafar ibn Said (1759–1760)
- Masaad ibn Said (II) (1760–1770)
- Ahmad ibn Said (1770)
- Abdullah (IV) ibn Hussein (1770–1773)
- Surur ibn Masaad (1773–1788)
- Abdul Muin ibn Masaad (1788)
- Ghalib ibn Masaad (1788–1803)
- Yahya (II) ibn Surur (1803–1813)
- Ghalib ibn Masaad (1813–1827)
- Abdul Mutalib ibn Ghalib (1827)
- Muhammad ibn Abdul Muin (1827–1836)
- Position vacant due to the rise of the Second Saudi State
- Muhammad ibn Abdul Muin (1840–1851)
- Abdul Mutalib ibn Ghalib (1851–1856)
- Muhammad ibn Abdul Muin (1856–1858)
- Abdullah Kamil Pasha ibn Muhammad (1858–1877)
- Hussein ibn Muhammad (1877–1880)
- Abdul Mutalib ibn Ghalib (1880–1882)
- Aun ar-Rafiq Pasha ibn Muhammad (1882–1905)
- Ali Pasha ibn Abd Allah (1905–1908)
- Hussein bin Ali Pasha (1908–1916)
- Ali Haidar Pasha (1916)
- Hussein bin Ali (1916–1924)
- Ali bin Hussein (1924–1925)

== See also ==
- Sharif of Mecca
- Ottoman Arabia
