= Abu Numayy I =

Emir of Mecca (c.1232 – 1301)

Emir of Mecca
- 1st reign: 1250 – Oct/Nov 1253
- Predecessor: Abu Sa'd al-Hasan
- Successor: Jammaz ibn al-Hasan
- Co-Emir: Abu Sa'd al-Hasan
- 2nd reign: Nov/Dec 1254 – 6 Jan 1255
- Predecessor: Ghanim ibn Rajih
- Successor: Ibn Birtas
- Co-Emir: Idris ibn Qatadah
- 3rd reign: 6 Mar 1255 – Nov 1270
- Predecessor: Ibn Birtas
- Successor: Idris ibn Qatadah
- Co-Emir: Idris ibn Qatadah
- 4th reign: Dec 1270 – Oct 1271
- Predecessor: Idris ibn Qatadah
- Successors: Jammaz ibn Shihah; Ghanim ibn Idris
- 5th reign: Nov 1271 – 1288
- Predecessors: Jammaz ibn Shihah; Ghanim ibn Idris
- Successor: Jammaz ibn Shihah
- 6th reign: 1288 – 6 Oct 1301
- Predecessor: Jammaz ibn Shihah
- Successors: Rumaythah ibn Abi Numayy; Humaydah ibn Abi Numayy
- Born: c. 1232
- Died: 8 Oct 1301; Wadi Marr al-Zahran (present-day Wadi Fatimah, Mecca Province, Saudi Arabia)
- Burial: al-Ma'la Cemetery; Mecca
Names
- Muḥammad Abū Numayy ibn Abī Sa‘d al-Ḥasan ibn ‘Alī ibn Qatādah al-Ḥasanī; Arabic: محمد أبو نمي بن أبي سعد الحسن بن علي بن قتادة الحسني
Regnal name
- Najm al-Dīn; Arabic: نجم الدين
- House: Banu Hasan; Banu Qatadah
- Father: Abu Sa'd al-Hasan

Muḥammad Abū Numayy ibn Abī Sa‘d al-Ḥasan ibn ‘Alī ibn Qatādah al-Ḥasanī (Arabic: محمد أبو نمي بن أبي سعد الحسن بن علي بن قتادة الحسني; c. 1232 – 8 October 1301), sometimes referred to as Abu Numayy I (أبو نمي الأول), was Emir of Mecca from 1250 to 1301, with interruptions.

== Life ==
=== Joint rule with his father Abu Sa'd al-Hasan ===
Muhammad Abu Numayy was born around the year 630 AH (c. 1232). His father Abu Sa'd al-Hasan assumed the Emirate of Mecca in Dhu al-Qi'dah 647 AH (February 1250). Soon afterwards, Rajih ibn Qatadah went to Medina where he acquired support from the Banu Husayn, his maternal relatives, to overthrow Abu Sa'd. He set out from Medina with 700 horsemen led by Isa ibn Shihah, Emir of Medina. On the way to Mecca they were ambushed by Abu Numayy, who had set out from Yanbu with only 40 horsemen after he received word of their advance. His attack was successful, and Rajih and Isa retreated to Medina. On Abu Numayy's triumphant return Abu Sa'd rewarded him with the co-rulership of Mecca.

Abu Sa'd reigned with Abu Numayy until Ramadan 651 AH (October/November 1253), when Jammaz ibn al-Hasan captured Mecca with Syrian troops and killed Abu Sa'd. Jammaz was quickly deposed by Rajih, who in turn was deposed by his son Ghanim in Rabi al-Awwal 652 AH (April/May 1254).

=== Joint rule with Idris ibn Qatadah ===
In Shawwal 652 AH (November/December 1254) Abu Numayy and Idris ibn Qatadah seized the Emirate from Ghanim ibn Rajih with limited bloodshed (three of the ashraf were killed). However the following month the Yemeni commander Mubariz al-Din Ibn Birtas arrived with a force of 100 horsemen to capture Mecca and reestablish Rasulid hegemony. Abu Numayy and Idris sought assistance from Jammaz ibn Shihah, Emir of Medina, but their alliance was defeated on Wednesday, 25 Dhu al-Qi'dah (6 January 1255) at Qawz al-Makkasah, south of Mecca, and Ibn Birtas occupied Mecca.

On the last Saturday of Muharram 653 AH (6 March 1255), Abu Numayy and Idris returned with reinforcements, supported again by Jammaz ibn Shihah, and delivered a crushing defeat to Ibn Birtas. Descending from the mountaintops, they entered Mecca by force and inflicted heavy casualties on the Yemeni army. Ibn Birtas himself was captured, but after ransoming himself he was allowed to return to Yemen.

In 654 AH (1256) Idris traveled to al-Sirrayn to visit his brother Rajih, and in his absence Abu Numayy took sole control of the Emirate. When Idris returned to Mecca with Rajih, the three reconciled and Idris returned to the co-rulership.

In 655 or 656 AH (1257 or 1258) Abu Numayy left Mecca to fight the Thaqif tribe, and in his absence some sons of Hasan ibn Qatadah took over Mecca and captured Idris. When Abu Numayy heard the news he returned to Mecca and the attackers fled without fighting, having held the city for six days.

In 659 AH (1261) al-Muzaffar Yusuf performed the Hajj. When he neared Mecca with his army Abu Numayy and Idris fled out of fear, returning only after his departure ten days after the completion of the Hajj.

In Sha'ban 667 AH (April 1269) Abu Numayy ousted Idris and ordered the khutbah with the name of al-Zahir Baybars, the Mamluk Sultan of Egypt. He informed Baybars that he had deposed his uncle due to the latter's pro-Rasulid inclinations, and requested that the Sultan issue a royal decree forbidding the Emir of Medina from assisting Idris. Baybars accepted Abu Numayy's allegiance on the condition that he fulfill his responsibilities towards the Masjid al-Haram and its visitors, including that he not impose any additional taxes. The Sultan further stipulated that both the khutbah (sermon) and Nuqrah dirhams. After Abu Numayy accepted these conditions Baybars sent him a diploma of investiture. Soon afterwards Idris reconciled with Abu Numayy and Baybars confirmed them both as joint Emirs. That year Baybars performed the Hajj and was pleased with their rule.

=== Independent rule ===
In Rabi al-Awwal 669 AH (November 1270) Abu Numayy's son was killed and he fought with Idris, who ousted him from the Emirate. Abu Numayy fled to Yanbu to seek assistance from its Emir. Forty days later, in Jumada al-Ula (December 1270) he returned with reinforcements and defeated Idris at Khulays. Abu Numayy personally beheaded his uncle and assumed independent control of the Emirate.

In late Safar 670 AH (October 1271) Jammaz ibn Shihah, Emir of Medina, entered into an alliance with Ghanim ibn Idris ibn Hasan ibn Qatadah, Emir of Yanbu, and together they captured Mecca and deposed Abu Numayy. They held the city for forty days, until Rabi al-Akhir (November 1271), when Abu Numayy defeated them in battle and retook the city. On 19 Rabi al-Akhir 675 AH (c. 29 September 1276) Jammaz advanced on Mecca with Idris ibn Hasan ibn Qatadah, Emir of Yanbu, and an army of 215 horsemen and 600 footsoldiers. He was defeated by Abu Numayy's forces at Marr al-Zahran, though Abu Numayy was outnumbered with only 100 horsemen and 180 footsoldiers. Idris was captured, but Jammaz escaped.

In 681 AH (1282/1283) al-Mansur Qalawun of Egypt demanded an oath of absolute loyalty from Abu Numayy. This latest treaty with the Mamluks concerned not only the khutbah and the sikkah in the Sultan's name, but also the Sultan's monopoly on supplying the annual kiswah.

In 687 AH (1288) Jammaz requested an army from Qalawun to depose Abu Numayy and bring Mecca more firmly under Mamluk rule. The Sultan sent Jammaz an army, and he succeeded in capturing the city from Abu Numayy. However his intentions were made clear when upon assuming rulership of Mecca he ordered the khutbah and sikkah in his own name. Before the end of the year Jammaz was poisoned, reportedly by one of the attendants of his wife Khuzaymah, daughter of Abu Numayy. He returned to Medina, and Abu Numayy reassumed the Emirate.

On the last day of Rabi al-Awwal 691 AH (21 March 1292) Abu Numayy replaced the name of al-Ashraf Khalil ibn Qalawun in the khutbah with that of al-Muzaffar of Yemen. In 692 AH the Mamluk amir al-rakab ordered Abu Numayy to accompany him back to Egypt. They set out in early 693 AH, but Abu Numayy turned back at Yanbu when they received word of Khalil's death.

=== Abdication and death ===
On Friday, 2 Safar 701 AH (6 October 1301) Abu Numayy abdicated in favor of his sons Humaydah and Rumaythah. He died two days later at al-Jadidah in Wadi Marr al-Zahran near Mecca. His funeral was in Mecca, and he was buried in the Ma'la Cemetery near the qubbah of his father Abu Sa'd and his great-grandfather Qatadah. A qubbah was built over his grave.

== Issue ==
According to Ibn Unbah, Abu Numayy had a total of 30 sons. Some of his sons died during his lifetime. According to al-Nuwayri, when Abu Numayy died he had 21 sons, 12 daughters, and 4 wives. Izz al-Din Ibn Fahd compiled the following list names of his sons:

- Ḥassān
- Ḥamzah
- Ḥumayḍah, Emir of Mecca
- Rājiḥ
- Rumaythah, Emir of Mecca
- Zayd al-Akbar ("the Elder")
- Zayd al-Aṣghar ("the Younger"), Sultan of Suakin, later Naqib of Talibids in Iraq.
- Sayf
- Shumaylah al-Shā‘ir ("the Poet")
- ‘Abd Allāh
- ‘Abd al-Karīm
- ‘Ātif
- ‘Aṭṭāf
- ‘Uṭayfah, Emir of Mecca
- Muqbil
- Lubaydah
- Manṣūr
- Mahdī
- Numayy
- Abū Da‘īj
- Abū Sa‘d
- Abū Suwayd
- Abū al-Ghayth, Emir of Mecca

It is reported that his kunya was Abu Mahdi, from which it can be inferred that his first-born son was named Mahdi. Therefore, it is possible that he did not have a son named Numayy, and that he was called Abu Numayy for a different reason.

His daughters included:

- Khuzaymah - wed Jammaz ibn Shihah, Emir of Medina, in 682 AH (1283)

== Notes ==
Muḥammad Abū Numayy ibn Abī Sa‘d al-Ḥasan ibn ‘Alī ibn Qatādah Banu Qatadah
Regnal titles
Preceded by Abu Sa'd al-Hasan	Emir of Mecca; 1250 – Oct/Nov 1253 with Abu Sa'd al-Hasan	Succeeded by Jammaz ibn al-Hasan
Preceded by Ghanim ibn Rajih	Emir of Mecca; Nov/Dec 1254 – 6 Jan 1255 with Idris ibn Qatadah	Succeeded by Ibn Birtas
Preceded by Ibn Birtas	Emir of Mecca; 6 Mar 1255 – Nov 1270 with Idris ibn Qatadah	Succeeded by Idris ibn Qatadah
Preceded by Idris ibn Qatadah	Emir of Mecca; Dec 1270 – Oct 1271	Succeeded by Jammaz ibn Shihah
Preceded by Idris ibn Qatadah	Emir of Mecca; Dec 1270 – Oct 1271	Succeeded by Ghanim ibn Idris
Preceded by Jammaz ibn Shihah	Emir of Mecca; Nov 1271 – 1288	Succeeded by Jammaz ibn Shihah
Preceded by Ghanim ibn Idris	Emir of Mecca; Nov 1271 – 1288	Succeeded by Jammaz ibn Shihah
Preceded by Jammaz ibn Shihah	Emir of Mecca; 1288 – 6 Oct 1301	Succeeded by Rumaythah ibn Abi Numayy
Preceded by Jammaz ibn Shihah	Emir of Mecca; 1288 – 6 Oct 1301	Succeeded by Humaydah ibn Abi Numayy
