= Mukaththir ibn Isa =

12th-century Arabian nobleman and last sharif or leader of Mecca of the Hawashim dynasty

Mukaththir ibn ‘Īsá ibn Fulaytah al-Ḥasanī al-‘Alawī (Arabic: مكثر بن عيسى بن فليتة الحسني العلوي; d. 1203–1204) was the last Emir of Mecca from the sharifian Hawashim dynasty, reigning at least three times between 1176 and 1203.

He was Mukaththir ibn Isa ibn Fulaytah ibn Qasim ibn Abi Hashim Muhammad, and his nasab (paternal lineage) continues to Hasan ibn Ali, the grandson of Muhammad. On 2 Sha'ban 570 AH (c. 5 March 1175) Mukaththir's father died, and his brother Da'ud became Emir of Mecca. Less than a year later, on the night of 15 Rajab 571 AH (c. 5 February 1176), Mukaththir deposed his brother and assumed the Emirate. On 15 Sha'ban 571 AH (c. 6 March 1175) Turanshah, the brother of Saladin, arrived in Mecca on his way to Syria. He summoned Mukaththir and Da'ud and made peace between them. In Dhu al-Hijjah of that year (June 1176) the Iraqi amir al-hajj Tashtakin al-Mustanjadi arrived with orders from the Caliph to depose Mukaththir. Fighting commenced on Yawm al-Nahr — 13 Dhu al-Hijjah (c. 30 June 1176) — and continued until 16 Dhu al-Hijjah (c. 3 July 1176), when Mukaththir finally surrendered his castle on Mount Abu Qubays and left Mecca. Tashtakin gave custodianship of the Emirate to Qasim ibn Muhanna, the Emir of Medina, but he surrendered it to Da'ud after only three days, reportedly out of fear of retaliation from Mukaththir. Reports indicate that by the following year, 572 AH (1176–1177), Mukaththir had once again supplanted Da'ud as Emir.

At some point the Emirate returned to Da'ud, as al-Dhahabi reports that he was Emir in 587 AH (1191–1192). He writes that in that year Da'ud looted the Kaaba of its wealth and stripped the Black Stone of its silver collar. When the amir al-hajj arrived he deposed Da'ud and installed Mukaththir once again as Emir. Da'ud died in 589 AH (1193), and Mukaththir reigned without interruption until Qatadah ibn Idris conquered Mecca and ended the reign of the Hawashim. According to varying reports, Qatadah's takeover of Mecca occurred between 597 and 599 AH (between 1200 and 1203). According to Ibn Mahfuz, in 597 AH (1200–1201) Hanzalah ibn Qatadah marched on Mecca and Mukaththir fled to Wadi Nakhlah, where he died in 600 AH (1203–1204).

== Sources ==
Mukaththir ibn Isa Hawashim
Regnal titles
Preceded by Da'ud	Emir of Mecca c. 5 Feb 1176 – c. 3 Jul 1176	Succeeded by Qasim ibn Muhanna
Preceded by Da'ud	Emir of Mecca; 1176/77 – ?	Succeeded by Da'ud
Preceded by Da'ud	Emir of Mecca; 1191/92 – 1201	Succeeded by Qatadah ibn Idris
