= Abd al-Aziz ibn Idris ibn Hasan =

‘Abd al-‘Azīz ibn Idrīs عبد العزيز بن إدريس

Emir of Mecca
- Reign: 17 March 1632 – 22 June 1632
- Predecessor: Muhammad ibn Abd Allah; Zayd ibn Muhsin
- Successor: Zayd ibn Muhsin
- Co-Emir: Nami ibn Abd al-Muttalib
- Died: 1652 or 1653; Mecca, Egypt
- House: Banu Qatadah

‘Abd al-‘Azīz ibn Idrīs ibn Ḥasan ibn Abī Numayy (Arabic: عبد العزيز بن إدريس بن حسن بن أبي نمي) was co-ruler of the Sharifate of Mecca with his cousin Nami ibn Abd al-Muttalib for three months in 1632.

After Nami captured Mecca on Wednesday, 17 March 1632 (25 Sha'ban 1041) he appointed Abd al-Aziz as his partner. Abd al-Aziz was entitled to one quarter of the Emirate, and his name was not included in the du‘a.

Abd al-Aziz fled Mecca with Nami on Tuesday, 22 June 1632 (4 Dhu al-Hijjah). On their way to the fortress of Turbah he separated from the group and went to Yanbu.

He died of plague in Egypt in 1652–1653 (1063 AH).

== Notes ==
‘Abd al-‘Azīz ibn Idrīs ibn Ḥasan ibn Abī Numayy Banu Qatadah
Regnal titles
| Preceded by Muhammad ibn Abd Allah; Zayd ibn Muhsin | Emir of Mecca; 17 Mar 1632 – 22 June 1632; With: Nami ibn Abd al-Muttalib | Succeeded by Zayd ibn Muhsin |
