= Abu Sa'd al-Hasan =

Emir of Mecca from 1250 to 1253

Emir of Mecca
- Reign: 1250–1253
- Predecessor: Ibn al-Musayyib
- Successor: Jammaz ibn al-Hasan
- Coregent: Abu Numayy I
- Died: 1253; Mecca
- Issue: Abu Numayy I
- House: Banu Hasan; Banu Qatadah
- Father: Abū al-Ḥasan ‘Alī

Arabic name
- Personal (Ism): Ḥasan حسن
- Patronymic (Nasab): ibn ‘Alī ibn Qatādah بن علي بن قتادة
- Teknonymic (Kunya): Abū Sa‘d أبو سعد
- Epithet (Laqab): Badr al-Dīn; Full Moon of the Faith بدر الدين
- Toponymic (Nisba): al-Ḥasanī al-Makkī the Hasanid, the Meccan الحسني المكي

Abū Sa‘d al-Ḥasan ibn ‘Alī ibn Qatādah ibn Idrīs al-Ḥasanī was Emir of Mecca from 1250 to 1253. His mother was an Abyssinian slave.

In 1232 al-Kamil of Egypt ordered Abu Sa'd, then Emir of Yanbu, to assist in recapturing Mecca from Rajih ibn Qatadah, who was supported by al-Mansur of Yemen.

In 1242 when al-Mansur captured Mecca he won over the allegiance of Abu Sa'd. The Sultan bought the fortress of Yanbu from Abu Sa'd and ordered for it to be destroyed, so as to not be utilized by the Egyptians, and assigned him to Wadi Marr to support the Yemeni army at Mecca.

In 1250 Abu Sa'd received support from leaders of the Zubayd tribe to wrest Mecca from the oppressive rule of Ibn al-Musayyib, the Yemeni emir. Abu Sa'd's Bedouin troops entered Mecca from two directions, and he took control of the city. According to al-Muyurqi, Ibn al-Musayyib was captured on Friday, 7 Dhu al-Qi'dah 647 AH (11 February 1250), while according to Ibn al-Mahfuz it was at the end of Shawwal (late January / early February). Abu Sa'd gathered the notables of Mecca in the Grand Mosque, where he expressed to them his continued loyalty to the Sultan, and explained that Ibn al-Musayyib had been planning to take the wealth he had stolen and flee to Iraq. Abu Sa'd's rule was strengthened after al-Mansur's death, news of which arrived a few days later.

Abu Sa'd was deposed and killed by his cousin Jammaz ibn Hasan in 651 AH. According to various reports it was either on 5 Shawwal (c. 28 November 1253), in the beginning of Ramadan (late October 1253), or on 3 Sha'ban (c. 28 September 1253).

Abu Sa'd al-Hasan ibn Ali ibn Qatadah Banu Qatadah Died: 1253
Regnal titles
| Preceded by Ibn al-Musayyib | Emir of Mecca; 1250–1253 | Succeeded by Jammaz ibn Hasan |
