= Abadilah =

Sharifian Arab clan

Al-Abadilah العبادلة
- Qatadid Arab Clan
- Location: Tihama
- Descended from: ‘Abd Allāh ibn Ḥasan ibn Abī Numayy
- Parent tribe: Banu Hashim; Hasanids; Dhawu 'Awn
- Demonym: al-Abdali
- Language: Arabic
- Religion: Islam

Abadilah (Arabic: العبادلة, romanized: al-ʿAbādilah, lit. 'the Abdallahs'), is an Arab Sharifian clan of Hasanid descent, tracing its lineage to Hasan ibn Ali, the grandson of the Islamic Prophet Muhammad. The clan is part of the Banu Hashim clan of the Quraysh, the Prophet’s tribe, and has historically held prominence in the southern Arabian Peninsula for its noble lineage and its preservation of genealogical and religious heritage.

== Origins and Ancestry ==
The al-ʿAbādilah trace their descent through ʿAbd Allāh, a descendant of al-Ḥasan ibn Abī Numayy II. Detailed genealogical records were preserved and recorded by Sharif ʿAbd Allāh ibn Ḥasan al-ʿAbādilī, who documents the family’s lineage and confirms its place within the broader Hasanid-Hashemite framework.

== History ==
The clan maintained a reputable status among the Sayyid families of the Arabian Peninsula. Members of the al-ʿAbādilah clan were known for their religious learning, leadership, and preservation of Sharifian genealogies.
