= Ghanim ibn Rajih =

13th-century Emir of Mecca (r. 1254–1254)

Emir of Mecca
- Reign: Apr/May – Nov/Dec 1254
- Predecessor: Rajih ibn Qatadah
- Successors: Idris ibn Qatadah; Abu Numayy ibn Abi Sa'd
Names
- Ghanim ibn Rajih ibn Qatadah al-Hasani; Arabic: غانم بن راجح بن قتادة الحسني
- House: Banu Hasan; Banu Qatadah
- Father: Rajih ibn Qatadah

Ghānim ibn Rājiḥ ibn Qatādah ibn Idrīs al-Ḥasanī (Arabic: غانم بن راجح بن قتادة بن إدريس الحسني) was Emir of Mecca for part of 1254. He assumed the Emirate in Rabi al-Awwal 652 AH (April/May 1254) after deposing his father Rajih without resistance. He reigned until Shawwal (November/December 1254) when he was defeated by Idris ibn Qatadah and Abu Numayy ibn Abi Sa'd.

He was reportedly disproportionately tall, to the extent that his hands reached his knees while standing. The same is reported about his father.

Ghanim ibn Rajih ibn Qatadah Banu Qatadah
Regnal titles
Preceded by Rajih ibn Qatadah	Emir of Mecca; Apr/May – Nov/Dec 1254	Succeeded by Idris ibn Qatadah
Preceded by Rajih ibn Qatadah	Emir of Mecca; Apr/May – Nov/Dec 1254	Succeeded by Abu Numayy ibn Abi Sa'd
