= Jammaz ibn Shihah =

Emir of Medina (1251/2-1304)

Emir of Medina
- Reign: 1251/2 – 1300/1 or 1302/3
- Predecessor: Isa ibn Shihah
- Successor: Mansur ibn Jammaz
- Co-Emirs: Munif ibn Shihah, Malik ibn Munif

Emir of Mecca
- Reign: 1271
- Predecessor: Abu Numayy Muhammad ibn Abi Sa'd
- Successor: Abu Numayy Muhammad ibn Abi Sa'd
- Reign: 1288
- Predecessor: Abu Numayy Muhammad ibn Abi Sa'd
- Successor: Abu Numayy Muhammad ibn Abi Sa'd
- Died: November/December 1304
- House: Banu Muhanna
- Father: Shihah ibn Hashim

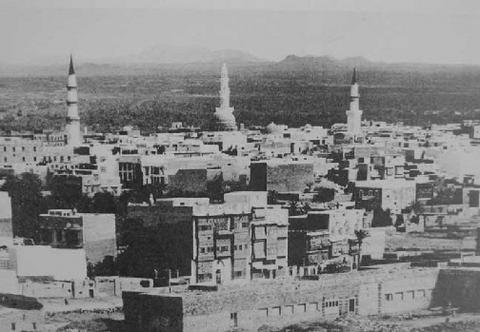
Medina in the past

Izz al-Dīn Abū Sanad Jammāz ibn Shīḥah ibn Hāshim al-Ḥusaynī (Arabic: عز الدين أبو سند جماز بن شيحة بن هاشم الحسيني) was the Husaynid Emir of Medina from 1259 to 1300/1 or 1302/3, and likely as co-emir or at least deputy of his brother Munif from 1251/2 on. He ruled, with a brief interruption in 1267/8, until 1300/1 or 1302/3. In the 1270s anengaged, he engaged in repeated attempts to capture the rival Emirate of Mecca to the south from its ruler, Abu Numayy Muhammad ibn Abi Sa'd. He succeeded briefly in 1271 and again in 1288, but was able to hold the city only for a few months. Incapacitated by blindness and advanced age, he handed over power to his son, Mansur, before dying in November/December 1304.

== Life ==
Jammaz was a younger son of Shihah ibn Hashim, who ruled the Sharifate of Medina from 1226/7 until his assassination in 1249/50. Shihah was succeeded by his son Isa, who had already served as his father's deputy; but he soon faced the opposition of his two brothers, Jammaz and Munif. Isa banned the brothers from entering Medina, but they were able to secure the support of Isa's vizier, and deposed him in 1251/2.

The 14th-century Medinese historian Ibn Farhun asserts that Munif became emir and that Jammaz served as his vizier, but other sources show that the brothers shared the emirate, and that Jammaz may have been the pre-eminent of the two. At any rate, Munif's death in 1259 left Jammaz as the sole emir of Medina, especially as Munif's son Malik was underage. In 1254, Jammaz led a Medinese force to Mecca, in order to aid its rulers, Idris ibn Qatadah and Abu Numayy ibn Abi Sa'd, against a Rasulid attack. The Medinese and Meccan forces were defeated, however, and the Rasulid general Ibn Birtas occupied Mecca.

In 1266/7, Malik ibn Munif, having come of age, sought to claim his father's inheritance, and turned to the Mamluk sultan Baybars, the suzerain of Medina. Baybars acceded to Malik's request, appointing him co-emir and giving him half the revenue from the charitable endowments destined for Medina from his domains in Egypt and Syria. While Jammaz accepted this decision, in the next year Malik ousted his uncle from Medina. Jammaz rallied support from Mecca and neighbouring Bedouin tribes, but was unable to recapture Medina. Despite this, Malik suddenly and for reasons that remain unclear, resigned from his office and restored Jammaz to his prior position as sole emir. Jammaz and Malik may again have briefly shared power in 1269, but otherwise Jammaz remained the undisputed ruler of Medina until the end of his reign.

With his position secure, Jammaz turned his sights on Mecca, which he sought to conquer. The first designs against Mecca may have arisen as early as 1268/9, when Abu Numayy expelled Idris ibn Qatadah from the city, but nothing materialized at the time. In 1271 Jammaz allied with the emir of Yanbu and occupied Mecca for forty days, until he was defeated in battle by Abu Numayy. Another campaign in 1275 was cut short by a truce in exchange for money, but in the next year Jammaz once again allied with the emir of Yanbu. Their combined forces, 215 horse and 800 foot, were defeated at Wadi Marr al-Zahran by Abu Numayy's much smaller army. Jammaz finally succeeded in occupying Mecca in 1288, taking advantage of Abu Numayy's attempts to distance himself from Maluk control; Sultan Qalawun gave Jammaz troops to bring Abu Numayy back to obedience, but instead Jammaz seized the town and had his own name read in the Friday sermon and stamped on coins. His rule lasted only a few months, however, as the Mamluk commander realized that he had been duped, and began negotiations with Abu Numayy instead, obliging Jammaz to return to Medina. This episode does not appear to have harmed Jammaz's standing with the Mamluk court, however; in 1292/3 he visited Cairo and was received with great honours by Qalawun's successor. Although his dynasty had traditionally been Twelver Shi'a and had always upheld Shi'a rituals, in 1283/4 the Mamluks installed a Sunni imam in the Prophet's Mosque.

In 1300/1 or 1302/3, due to his advanced age and increasingly poor eyesight, Jammaz handed over power to his son, Mansur. He tried to bind his eleven other sons with oaths of loyalty to Mansur, with little success, although open opposition emerged only after the death of Jammaz in November/December 1304.

== Sources ==
- Mortel, Richard T. (1994). "The Ḥusaynid Amirate of Madīna during the Mamlūk Period". Studia Islamica. 80 (80): 97–123. doi:10.2307/1595853. JSTOR 1595853.
