= Bayt Radm =

Bayt Radm بيت ردم
- Village
- Location in Yemen
- Coordinates: 15°14′00″N 44°03′49″E
- Country: Yemen
- Governorate: Sanaa
- District: Bani Matar
- Time zone: UTC+3 (Yemen Standard Time)

Bayt Radm (Arabic: بيت ردم, romanized: Bayt Radm), also spelled Bayt Radam, and spelled Bayt Ardam in some historical sources, is a village in Bani Matar District of Sanaa Governorate, Yemen. It is located about 20 km (12 mi) southwest of Sanaa, a bit to the south of the road to al-Hudaydah.

== History ==
Bayt Radm's fortress served as a minor stronghold from the end of the 12th century. Its first mention in the Ghayat al-amani of Yahya ibn al-Husayn is in connection with the events of the year 1203 (599 AH). In 1244 (642 AH), it was one of only three forts in the Sanaa area—the other were Thula and Dhu Marmar—that remained uncontrolled by the first Rasulid sultan, Nur al-Din Umar. There is no indication, however, that Bayt Radm was anywhere near as important as either of the other two forts.
