= Jughril =

13th-century Emir of Mecca (r. 1235–1238)

Asad al-Dīn Jughrīl ibn ‘Abd Allāh al-Kāmilī (Arabic: أسد الدين جغريل بن عبد الله الكاملي) was the Ayyubid Emir of Mecca from 1235 to 1238.

In 1235 Sultan al-Kamil sent Emir Jughril to capture Mecca from Sharif Rajih ibn Qatadah, an ally of Sultan al-Mansur Umar of Yemen. Jughril captured the city in Ramadan 632 AH (May/June 1235). According to al-Nuwayri his army numbered 700 horsemen, while according to some other historians he had 500 horsemen and four emirs: Wajh al-Sab', al-Bunduqi, Ibn Abi Dhikri, and Ibn Birtas.

In 633 AH (1235/1236) Jughril fought and defeated Rajih at al-Khariqayn, a place between Mecca and al-Sirrayn. He also captured the Yemeni Emir al-Shihab Ibn Abdan and sent him as a prisoner back to Egypt.

On 7 Rajab 635 (c. 23 February 1238) Jughril and his men withdrew from Mecca to escape al-Mansur's army. In Medina he received the news of al-Kamil's death. He returned to Egypt in mid-Sha'ban (March/April 1238).

Preceded by Rajih ibn Qatadah	Emir of Mecca; May/Jun 1235 – c. 23 Feb 1238	Succeeded by Rajih ibn Qatadah
