= Zayd ibn Muhsin =

Sharif and Emir of Mecca from 1631 to 1666

Zayd ibn Muḥsin زيد بن محسن

Emir of Mecca
- Reign: 29 August 1631 – 17 March 1632
- Predecessor: Abd Allah ibn Hasan
- Successor: Nami ibn Abd al-Muttalib; Abd al-Aziz ibn Idris
- Co-Emir: Muhammad ibn Abd Allah
- Reign: 24 June 1632 – 6 July 1666
- Predecessor: Nami ibn Abd al-Muttalib; Abd al-Aziz ibn Idris
- Successor: Sa'd ibn Zayd; Hammud ibn Abd Allah
- Born: 17 December 1607; Bisha, Hejaz
- Died: 6 July 1666 (aged 58); Mecca, Hejaz
- House: Banu Qatadah

Zayd ibn Muḥsin ibn Ḥusayn ibn Ḥasan ibn Abī Numayy (Arabic: زيد بن محسن بن حسين بن حسن بن أبي نمي) was an Emir of Mecca from 29 August 1631 to 17 March 1632 and then from 24 June 1632 to 6 July 1666, and the ancestor of the Dhawu Zayd clan.

== Early life ==
Zayd was born on Monday morning, 27 Sha‘ban 1016 AH (17 December 1607) near Bisha. He was the son of the Emir of Mecca Muhsin ibn Husayn and a slave woman named Quwwat al-Nufus. In 1628 he accompanied his father to Yemen after the latter was forced to surrender the Emirate to Ahmad ibn Abd al-Muttalib. Muhsin died in Sanaa in 1629. Zayd remained in Yemen until 1631, when he returned to Mecca to serve as co-Emir with Muhammad ibn Abd Allah ibn Hasan.

== Co-Emir of Mecca ==
On Friday, 1 Safar 1041 AH (29 August 1631), Abd Allah ibn Hasan (Zayd's great-uncle) handed over power to his son Muhammad and summoned Zayd from Yemen to be co-ruler. Zayd arrived at Mecca and took up his office in the second half of Safar (September 1631). Abd Allah continued to be mentioned alongside Muhammad and Zayd in the du‘a until his death on Friday night, 10 Jumada II (1–2 January 1632).

In Jumada I or Jumada II, Dilawar Agha arrived by sea to replace Mustafa Bey as governor of Jeddah. He also brought royal decrees and khil‘ahs (robes of honor) for the new Emirs of Mecca. Muhammad and Zayd were each invested with two khil‘ahs—the first from the Sultan, and the second from the Wali of Egypt.

=== Battle of Wadi al-Biyar and deposition ===
In early Sha'ban 1041 (February–March 1632) news reached Mecca that an army of disaffected soldiers had left Yemen and was on its way to Mecca. After reaching Qunfudhah their commanders Kor Mahmud and Ali Bey sent word to Mecca that they wished to enter the holy city on their way to Egypt. Fearful of the disorder that the army would cause, Muhammad and Zayd denied them permission and despoiled the wells in the army's path. In retaliation the rebels allied with Nami ibn Abd al-Muttalib, a contender for the Emirate, and decided to enter the city by force. On Friday, 20 Sha'ban (12 March 1632), Muhammad and Zayd collected their forces and set out to intercept the advancing army. Mustafa Bey accompanied them with his own soldiers. They went to Birkat Majin, then to Qawz al-Makkasah, as they had received word that the army had reached al-Sa'diyah. At dawn on Wednesday, 25 Sha'ban (17 March 1632), the two sides met in battle near Wadi al-Biyar. After heavy fighting the Emirate's forces were defeated. Muhammad was killed along with several ashraf and two hundred of their army. The majority of the sanjak-bey's men were also killed. Zayd retreated with the surviving ashraf towards Wadi Marr al-Zahran while the rebels entered Mecca. Nami ibn Abd al-Muttalib was proclaimed Emir of Mecca, and he appointed his cousin Abd al-Aziz ibn Idris as his co-ruler.

== Return to the Emirate ==
After being deposed from the Emirate, Zayd went to Medina, and from there he and sent word of Mecca's capture to Halil Pasha, Wali of Egypt. In Shawwal 1041 the Wali dispatched 3,500 soldiers to the Hejaz by land and sea. He sent ahead robes of investiture to Zayd with instructions to go to Yanbu to receive the army. On Tuesday, 4 Dhu al-Hijjah (22 June 1632), Nami and the rebels evacuated Mecca and barricaded themselves at the fortress of Turbah. Zayd and the Egyptian army entered Mecca without resistance at sunrise on 6 Dhu al-Hijjah (24 June 1632).

=== Siege of Turbah ===
After performing the Hajj, Zayd and the sanjak-beys went to Turbah, where they besieged the fortress for around twenty days. On Friday night, 11 Muharram 1042 AH (29 July 1632), they entered the fortress and killed most of the rebels inside. They captured Kor Mahmud, Nami, and his brother Sayyid, and returned them to Mecca, where they were executed.

== Death ==
Zayd reigned uninterrupted until his death on Tuesday, 3 Muharram 1077 AH (6 July 1666). He was buried in al-Ma'lah in the qubba of Abu Talib ibn Hasan ibn Abi Numayy. After his death the Emirate was contested between his son Sa'd and his cousin Hammud ibn Abd Allah.

== Household ==
Zayd had five sons:

- Sa'd: Born 1052 AH
- Hasan
- Ahmad: Born 1052 AH
- Muhammad Yahya: Born 1049 AH
- Husayn: Died before Zayd

Among his personal slaves there was Bilal Agha, an Abyssinian who held a high position in his court, and Dhu al-Fiqar, a Turkic mamluk who had been with him for many years and whom he made commander of his army.

== Notes ==
Zayd ibn Muḥsin ibn Ḥusayn ibn Ḥasan ibn Abī Numayy Banu Qatadah
Regnal titles
Preceded by Abd Allah ibn Hasan	Emir of Mecca; 29 August 1631 – 17 March 1632; With: Muhammad ibn Abd Allah	Succeeded by Nami ibn Abd al-Muttalib; Abd al-Aziz ibn Idris
Preceded by Nami ibn Abd al-Muttalib; Abd al-Aziz ibn Idris	Emir of Mecca; 24 June 1632 – 6 July 1666	Succeeded by Sa'd ibn Zayd; Hammud ibn Abd Allah
