= Sa'd ibn Zayd =

Sa‘d ibn Zayd ibn Muḥsin (Arabic: سعد بن زيد بن محسن) was Sharif and Emir of Mecca from 1666 to 1672, 1692 to 1694, 1694 to 1702, and briefly in 1704.

== Birth ==
He was born in 1052 AH (1642/1643), the son of Zayd ibn Muhsin.

== First reign ==
Sharif Zayd died in Mecca on Tuesday, 3 Muharram 1077 AH (6 July 1666), after 35 years on the throne. He was survived by four sons: Sa'd, Hasan, Muhammad Yahya, and Ahmad. Only Sa'd and Hasan were present at his death; Muhammad Yahya was in Medina and Ahmad was in Najd.

After Zayd's death there was disagreement among the ashraf as to who should succeed him as Emir of Mecca. The majority sided with Hamud ibn Abd Allah, whose claim lay in the fact that it was his father, Sharif Abd Allah ibn Hasan, who had originally summoned Zayd from Yemen to be co-ruler with his son Muhammad ibn Abd Allah. Only a small party of ashraf backed Sa'd for the Emirate, namely: Mubarak ibn Muhammad al-Harith, Rajih ibn Qaytbay, Abd al-Muttalib ibn Muhammad, Mudar ibn al-Murtada, Husayn ibn Yahya, Faris ibn Barakat, and Muhammad ibn Ahmad ibn Ali. Both sides petitioned Imad Agha, who as sanjak-bey of Jeddah and shaykh al-haram of Mecca was the Ottoman government's representative in the land. Imad Agha decided in favor of Sa'd and sent him the khil'ah (robe of honor).
