= Nami ibn Abd al-Muttalib =

Nāmī ibn ‘Abd al-Muṭṭalib نامي بن عبد المطلب

Emir of Mecca
- Reign: 17 March 1632 – 22 June 1632
- Predecessor: Muhammad ibn Abd Allah; Zayd ibn Muhsin
- Successor: Zayd ibn Muhsin
- Co-Emir: Abd al-Aziz ibn Idris
- Died: 5 August 1632; Mecca, Hejaz
- House: Banu Qatadah

Nāmī ibn ‘Abd al-Muṭṭalib ibn Ḥasan ibn Abī Numayy (Arabic: نامي بن عبد المطلب بن حسن بن أبي نمي) was Emir of Mecca for three months in 1632.

In 1632 (1041 AH) Nami allied with the rebel commander Kor Mahmud to capture Mecca. They entered the city victorious on Wednesday, 17 March 1632 (25 Sha'ban 1041 AH ), after defeating the Emirs Muhammad ibn Abd Allah and Zayd ibn Muhsin at Wadi al-Biyar. The rebel army proceeded to pillage Mecca and Jeddah. Nami was proclaimed Emir, and appointed his cousin Abd al-Aziz ibn Idris ibn Hasan as co-ruler, though without inclusion in the dua. He also killed Mustafa Bey, the commander of the Ottoman regiment that had fought alongside Muhammad and Zayd at Wadi al-Biyar.

When the governor of Egypt Halil Pasha received news of the events in Mecca, he sent a large army to restore Zayd to the Emirate. On Tuesday, 22 June 1632 (4 Dhu al-Hijjah) Nami escaped with his confederates and barricaded himself at the fortress of Turbah. On Thursday, 29 July 1632 (10 Muharram 1042, or the night of 11 Muharram), Ottoman troops entered the fortress and captured Nami, his brother Sayyid, and Kor Mahmud. They were taken prisoner and returned to Mecca, where it was decided that they should be put to death.

Nami was hanged at al-Muda'a, Mecca, on Thursday, 5 August 1632 (18 Muharram 1042).

Nāmī ibn ‘Abd al-Muṭṭalib ibn Ḥasan ibn Abī Numayy Banu Qatadah
Regnal titles
Preceded by Muhammad ibn Abd Allah; Zayd ibn Muhsin	Emir of Mecca; 17 Mar 1632 – 22 June 1632; With: Abd al-Aziz ibn Idris ibn Hasan	Succeeded by Zayd ibn Muhsin
