= Qatada ibn Idris =

13th century Sharif of Mecca

Emir of Mecca
- Reign: 1201–1220
- Predecessor: Mukaththir
- Successor: Hasan
- Born: c. early 1130s or 1150s Yanbu, Fatimid Caliphate (present-day Saudi Arabia)
- Died: 1220/1221; Mecca, Ayyubid Sultanate (present-day Saudi Arabia)
- House: Banu Hasan
- Arabic name
- Personal (Ism): Qatāda قتادة
- Patronymic (Nasab): Ibn Idrīs ibn Muṭā‘in بن إدريس بن مطاعن
- Teknonymic (Kunya): Abū ʿAzīz أبو عزيز
- Toponymic (Nisba): Al-Ḥasanī al-ʿAlawī al-Yanbuʿī al-Makkī 'the Hasanid, the Alid, the Yanbuite, the Meccan' الحسني العلوي الينبعى المكي

Abu Aziz Qatada ibn Idris al-Hasani al-Alawi al-Yanbu'i al-Makki (Arabic: أبو عزيز قتادة بن إدريس الحسني العلوي الينبعى المكي, romanized: Abū ʿAzīz Qatāda ibn Idrīs al-Ḥasanī al-ʿAlawī al-Yanbuʿī al-Makkī; d. 1220/1221) was the Sharif of Mecca, reigning from 1201 to 1220/1221. He also founded the Banu Qatadah dynasty and established a tradition of sharifs descended from him to rule Mecca which lasted until the office was abolished in 1925. Regarding his sectarian denomination, Qatadah ibn Idris was a Zaidi Shi'ite.

== Early life ==
Qatada's date of birth is not recorded, but based on differing reports of his age at death he was born circa either the early 1130s or the early 1150s. He claimed to be a sharif — apparently a descendant of Muhammad's grandson Hasan ibn Ali, in the fifteenth degree. His claimed genealogy is: Qatada ibn Idris ibn Muta'in ibn Abd al-Karim ibn Isa ibn Husayn ibn Sulayman ibn Ali ibn Abd Allah ibn Muhammad al-Tha'ir ibn Musa al-Thani ibn Abd Allah al-Shaykh al-Salih ibn Musa al-Jawn ibn Abd Allah al-Mahd ibn al-Hasan al-Muthanna ibn al-Hasan ibn Ali. Ibn Khaldun writes that the Banu Hasan ibn Hasan (descendants of Hasan ibn Hasan ibn Ali) up to Qatadah's time were settled around Nahr al-Alqamiyah in Wadi Yanbu. He classifies them as people of the badiyah (pastoral desert or countryside), as distinguished from people of the hadar (urban center).

According to al-Mundhiri in his Takmilah, Qatada was born and raised in Wadi Yanbu. After attaining leadership of his clan, the Dhawu Muta'in, he embarked on a campaign of territorial expansion. He fought the sharifian clans of Banu Harab, Banu Isa, Banu Ali, Banu Ahmad, and Banu Ibrahim. Then he took support from the Banu Ahmad and Banu Ibrahim and completed his conquest of Wadi Yanbu. Next he moved south and conquered Wadi al-Safra from the Banu Yahya.

Peters theorizes that Qatada may have taken part in the defense of Medina against the expeditionary Crusader force launched by Raynald of Châtillon in 1183.

== Sharif of Mecca ==
Between the Ayyubid takeover of Mecca in 1175 and 1200, Abbasid leaders, Medina-based sharifs, and the Ayyubids under Emir Tughtakin ibn Ayyub (Saladin's brother) fought for control of the city which was governed by Emir Mikhtar. In 1200-01, the dignitaries of Mecca chose Qatada, one of their own, to rule in Mikhtar's place. Qatada was recognized by the Ayyubid sultan of Egypt, al-Kamil, as the emir (prince) of Mecca. After gaining control over the Emirate of Mecca, Qatadah extended his influence to Medina and Ta'if, and parts of Najd and Yemen. He maintained a garrisoned fortress in Yanbu which made it possible to exact a good share of the profits of the Red Sea trade as it stopped at this port before proceeding to Egypt. Dutch historian Snouck Hurgronje referred to him as a "political genius".

In 1205, Qatada and the Sharif of Medina, Salim ibn Qasim al-Husayni, entered into conflict. Each gathered a large army and battled at the outskirts of Medina. After visiting and praying at the Islamic prophet Muhammad's chamber in the Masjid an-Nabawi, Qatada proceeded to confront Salim. The latter drove him back and pursued Qatadah to Mecca. Salim besieged him there, but Qatada sent letters to Salim's commanders requesting that they defect. Salim's commanders consequently became inclined to support Qatada. After realizing this, Salim withdrew to Medina, and Qatada's position in the region was strengthened.

Qatada's growing autonomy and actions troubled the Abbasid caliph in Baghdad, the Ayyubid sultan in Cairo, and the Ayyubid emir in Yemen. Challenges from those authorities coincided with the annual Hajj pilgrim caravan to Mecca. Accordingly, caravans from Cairo, Baghdad, and Damascus were accompanied by whatever number of troops the caliph or sultan deemed necessary to deliver a message to Qatada. In 1212, an assassination attempt on Qatada occurred during the Hajj. Qatada suspected the Abbasids were responsible and ordered his Nubian slave troops to attack the Baghdadi caravan, although they had already fled to join the Damascene caravan where they gained protection from Saladin's mother. Qatada demanded a compensation of 100,000 dinars for calling off the attack on the caravan, but when Saladin's mother could only raise 30,000 dinars, Qatada desisted nonetheless. However, he also promised to kill any pilgrim coming from Baghdad during the following year.

== Personal life ==
Qatada married twice, the first was to a woman from the descendants of Hussein bin Ali, with whom he had several children, Aziz, Hanzala, Idris, Rajih and Ali the Younger. His second marriage was to a woman from the Anazzah tribe, with whom he had two sons, Ali the Elder and Hasan.

Sharif Hussein, the founder of the Great Arab Revolt, was a descendant of Ali the Elder.

== Death ==
In 1220 or 1221, Qatadah was strangled to death by his son Hasan. According to the medieval Muslim historian, Ibn al-Athir, Qatada, who had been feeling ill, assembled an army led by his brother and Hasan to march towards Medina. When they camped near the city, Hasan heard his uncle inform the troops that Qatada was near death and made them swear their loyalty to him shall Qatada die. Hasan came to his uncle's presence and had his mamluks (slave soldiers) kill him. The news outraged Qatada who vowed to have his son killed.

One of Qatada's men informed Hasan of the situation, and the latter subsequently rode back to Mecca to confront his father. After ordering the large gathering outside of Qatada's residence to disperse, Hasan met his father, who reprimanded him. Hasan turned on Qatada and throttled him. Hasan then left the residence to inform the townspeople that his father was very ill and then recalled the local leaders of Mecca to tell them that Qatada was dead. According to this account, he brought out a coffin and buried it to give onlookers the impression that Qatada died of natural causes, but Hasan had his father secretly buried beforehand. The power accumulated by Qatada remained in the hands of his descendants until the abdication of Ali ibn Hussein in 1925.

According to historians Abu Shamah, al-Dhahabi, Ibn Kathir, and Sibt Ibn al-Jawzi, Qatada died in Jumada al-Ula 617 AH (July/August 1220). Al-Mundhiri writes that it was Jumada al-Thani 617 AH (August/September 1220), while Ibn al-Athir writes that it was Jumada al-Thani 618 AH (July/August 1221). According to some historians he was around 70 years old (Ibn al-Athir), while according to others he was around 90 (al-Dhahabi, al-Mundhiri, al-Maqrizi, Abu al-Fida).

== Bibliography ==
- Ibn Fahd, ‘Izz al-Dīn ‘Abd al-‘Azīz ibn ‘Umar ibn Muḥammad (1986) [composed before 1518]. Shaltūt, Fahīm Muḥammad (ed.). Ghāyat al-marām bi-akhbār salṭanat al-Balad al-Ḥarām غاية المرام بأخبار سلطنة البلد الحرام (in Arabic). Vol. 1 (1st ed.). Makkah: Jāmi‘at Umm al-Qurá, Markaz al-Baḥth al-‘Ilmī wa-Iḥyā’ al-Turāth al-Islāmī, Kullīyat al-Sharīʻah wa-al-Dirāsāt al-Islāmīyah.
- al-Qalqashandī, Shihāb al-Dīn Abū al-‘Abbas Aḥmad ibn ‘Alī (1914) [1412]. Ṣubḥ al-a'shá صبح الأعشى (in Arabic). Vol. 4. al-Qāhirah: Dār al-Kutub al-Khidīwīyah.
- Ibn Khaldūn, ‘Abd al-Raḥmān ibn Muḥammad (2000). Shahādah, Khalīl; Zakār, Suhayl (eds.). Tārīkh Ibn Khaldūn تاريخ ابن خلدون (in Arabic). Vol. 4. Bayrūt: Dār al-Fikr.
- Ibn al-Athir, Izz al-Din; Richards, D.S. (2008), The chronicle of Ibn al-Athīr for the Crusading Period from al-Kāmil fi'l-taroikh: The years 589-629/1193-1231: the Ayyūbids after Saladin and the Mongol Menace, Ashgate Publishing, Ltd., ISBN 978-0-7546-4079-0
- Peters, Francis E. (1994), Mecca: a Literary History of the Muslim Holy Land, Princeton University Press, ISBN 978-0-691-03267-2
- Salibi, Kamal S. (1998), The Modern History of Jordan, I.B.Tauris, ISBN 978-1-86064-331-6

Regnal titles
Preceded by Mukaththir	Emir of Mecca; 1201–1220	Succeeded by Hasan
