= Hasan ibn Qatadah =

13th-century Emir of Mecca (r. 1220–1222)

Ḥasan ibn Qatādah ibn Idrīs al-Ḥasanī (Arabic: حسن بن قتادة بن إدريس بن مطاعن الحسني القرشي) was the Sharif of Mecca from July 1220 to 1222. He was born to Qatadah ibn Idris and a woman from the Anizah tribe.

He assumed the Sharifate of Mecca after the death of his father. According to Islamic sources, including Abu Shamah, al-Dhahabi, and Ibn Kathir, Qatadah died in July 1220. Al-Mundhiri writes that he died in late August 1220, while Ibn al-Athir writes that he died somewhere in July or August 1221. Historians mention that Hasan killed his father, brother, and uncle to gain control the Emirate.

Hasan was then dethroned somewhere in April or May 1222 by al-Mas'ud Yusuf, the Ayyubid Emir of Yemen. Hassan fled to his mother's tribe, then He fled to Damascus, then to Baghdad, where he died in 1226. A Shi'ite, Hasan was buried in the mashhad of Musa al-Kazim.

Hasan ibn Qatadah Banu Qatadah
Regnal titles
Preceded by Qatadah ibn Idris	Emir of Mecca; 1220–1222	Succeeded by Nur al-Din Umar
