= Jammaz ibn Hasan =

13th-century Emir of Mecca (r. 1253–1254)

Jammāz ibn al-Ḥasan ibn Qatādah ibn Idrīs al-Ḥasanī was Emir of Mecca for a few months from 1253 to 1254.

== Emir of Mecca ==
Jammaz sought the assistance of an-Nasir Yusuf, the Ayyubid Sultan of Damascus, against his cousin Abu Sa'd al-Hasan, the Emir of Mecca. Supported by Syrian troops Jammaz entered Mecca in Ramadan 651 AH (October/November 1253) and deposed and killed Abu Sa'd. (Note: Though it is reported that Jammaz entered Mecca in Ramadan 651 AH and killed his cousin, sources differ on the date of Abu Sa'd's death: 5 Shawwal (c. 28 November 1253), early Ramadan 651 AH (late October 1253), or 3 Sha'ban (c. 28 September 1253).) However, he reneged on his promise to put al-Nasir's name in the khutbah, and instead continued the khutbah in the name of the Sultan of Yemen, al-Muzaffar Yusuf.

On the last day of Dhu al-Hijjah (c. 20 February 1254) his uncle Rajih ibn Qatadah took the Emirate from him without resistance, and Jammaz fled to Yanbu.

== Descendants ==
The later Emirs of Yanbu were from among his progeny.

== Notes ==
Jammaz ibn al-Hasan ibn Qatadah Banu Qatadah
Regnal titles
Preceded by Abu Sa'd al-Hasan	Emir of Mecca; 1253 – February 1254	Succeeded by Rajih ibn Qatadah
