= Mas'ud ibn Idris =

Emir of Mecca and ruler of Hejaz from 1629 to 1630

Mas‘ūd ibn Idrīs مسعود بن إدريس

Emir of Mecca
- Reign: 23 September 1629 – 3 December 1630
- Predecessor: Ahmad ibn Abd al-Muttalib
- Successor: Abd Allah ibn Hasan
- Died: 3 December 1630; Mecca, Hejaz
- House: Banu Qatadah

Mas‘ūd ibn Idrīs ibn Ḥasan ibn Abī Numayy (Arabic: مسعود بن إدريس بن حسن بن أبي نمي) was Emir of Mecca and ruler of the Hejaz from 1629 to 1630.

Kansuh Pasha, governor of Yemen, installed Mas'ud as Emir on Sunday, 5 Safar 1039 (23 September 1629), after assassinating Ahmad ibn Abd al-Muttalib.

Mas'ud died in Mecca of tuberculosis on Tuesday night, 28 Rabi II 1040 AH (the night of 2–3 December 1630). His funeral prayer was performed in the Masjid al-Haram, and he was buried in the qubba of Khadijah. The year of his death is recorded numerically in the poet's verse:

ها توفي مسعود نجل إدريس / There died Mas'ud, son of Idris

== Notes ==
Mas‘ūd ibn Idrīs ibn Ḥasan ibn Abī Numayy Banu Qatadah
Regnal titles
Preceded by Ahmad ibn Abd al-Muttalib	Emir of Mecca; 23 September 1629 – 3 December 1630	Succeeded by Abd Allah ibn Hasan
