= Abu Ja'far Muslim =

Prominent member of the ashraf families of Egypt

Abū Jaʿfar Muslim ibn ʿUbayd Allāh al-Ḥusaynī (Arabic: أبو جعفر مسلم الحسيني; died 976/7) was a Husaynid and the most prominent member of the ashraf families of Egypt during the late Ikhshidid dynasty and the early Fatimid Caliphate. His son Tahir ibn Muslim established the Sharifate of Medina.

== Family ==
He was a descendant of Husayn ibn Ali (Note: His full genealogy is given by Jamal al-Din Ahmad ibn Ali al-Hasani as "Abu Ja'far Muslim ibn Ubayd Allah ibn Tahir ibn Yahya ibn al-Hasan ibn Ja'far ibn Ubayd Allah ibn al-Husayn al-Asghar ibn Ali Zayn al-Abidin ibn al-Husayn ibn Ali". References in ibn Khaldun and ibn Taghribirdi seem to corroborate it, although al-Qalqashandi gives the name of his father as al-Hasan.) through the Shiʻi Imam Ali ibn Husayn Zayn al-Abidin, who had settled in Medina after Husayn's death in the Battle of Karbala. There the Husaynids had become the most prominent local family, and in the early 10th century, some of them had migrated to Egypt.

Abu Ja'far had two younger brothers: Abu'l-Husayn Isa and Abu Muhammad Abd Allah, known as Akhu Muslim. The latter was a proud and haughty man who possessed military ability, as he was entrusted with commanding an army and gubernatorial office by the Ikhshidid strongman Abu al-Misk Kafur. Akhu Muslim later fell in with the Qarmatians and became a determined enemy of the Fatimids until his death in 974.

== Under the Ikhshidids ==
During the supremacy of Kafur in Egypt, Abu Ja'far was considered as the chief of the ashraf. Knowledgeable and cultured, he was an expert in Alid genealogical matters and is said to have transmitted hadiths. According to Thierry Bianquis, he was renowned for his "proverbial piety". Abu Ja'far's travails with Kafur's court fool, Sibawayh, who played pranks on him and called him a "Meccan paedophile" reveal, according to Bianquis, a humility of character bordering on pusillanimity.

Nevertheless, the same qualities made him a much sought after as a mediator and conciliator in factional squabbles among the elite. During the turbulent period that followed Kafur's death in April 968, he mediated between the vizier Ja'far ibn al-Furat—a scholar, extremely pious, patron of the ashraf, and close friend of Abu Ja'far—and the other factions to arrive at a power-sharing arrangement. It was likewise his intervention with Ibn al-Furat that secured the release of Ibn al-Furat's rival Ya'qub ibn Killis, while in February 969, his intercession secured the release of Ibn al-Furat, who had been imprisoned by Emir al-Hasan ibn Ubayd Allah ibn Tughj.

== Under the Fatimids ==
During the Fatimid conquest of Egypt, he led the delegation of notables from Fustat that met with the Fatimid commander Jawhar to negotiate the surrender of the city and Egypt to him and secure a writ of sureties (amān). As the Ikhshidid troops briefly resisted the Fatimid advance, the amān was void, and Abu Ja'far was tasked with approaching Jawhar to secure its renewal. Jawhar agreed, and charged Abu Ja'far Muslim with its upkeep, even giving him the right to issue personal writs of amān as he saw fit in Jawhar's name.

Abu Ja'far latter appears to have retained his contacts in the Hejaz, and possibly enjoyed some authority in Medina; certainly the Husaynids of Medina quickly recognized the Fatimids, with the khuṭba being read in the name of Fatimid caliph al-Mu'izz li-Din Allah in 969 or 970, and even assisted them in imposing their control over Mecca as well.

When al-Mu'izz moved his court from Ifriqiya to Egypt in 973, Abu Ja'far went to Alexandria at the head of a delegation of notables to meet and accompany him during the last part of his journey to Cairo. The Fatimid ruler showed particular care for Abu Ja'far, insisting that he ride a palanquin, since the hot June sun and the ongoing Ramadan fast made travel difficult for a man of his years. Al-Mu'izz continued Jawhar's policy of accommodating the ashraf after he arrived in Egypt, and heaped honours on Abu Ja'far Muslim.

This privileged relationship was strained during the Qarmatian invasion of 974. Not only was Abu Ja'far's brother Akhu Muslim one of the chief Qarmatian leaders, but several of the younger ashraf, including Abu Ja'far's own son Ja'far, left Fustat to join the invaders. During the mobilization to save the capital from the Qarmatians, however, when the entire male population was called to arms, al-Mu'izz made an exception for Abu Ja'far.

Nevertheless, soon after, Abu Ja'far refused to sanction the marriage of his daughter and the Caliph's son. According to some accounts al-Mu'izz then had Abu Ja'far thrown in prison, and he was saved from a worse fate only through the appeal on his behalf of the ashraf of Mecca. However, other sources such as Ibn Khaldun and Ibn Taghribirdi refute this. At any rate, when he died in 976/7 CE (366 AH), his funeral was attended by al-Mu'izz's successor, al-Aziz Billah.

== Offspring ==
Shortly after his death, his son, Tahir, returned to Medina, where he was recognized as the leader of the ashraf of the city and became the first in a long series of Husaynid emirs (also known as sharifs) of the city.

== Sources ==
- Bianquis, Thierry (1972). "La prise de pouvoir par les Fatimides en Égypte (357‑363/968‑974)" [The Seizure of Power by the Fatimids in Egypt (357–363/968–974)]. Annales islamologiques (in French). XI: 49–108. doi:10.3406/anisl.1972.950. ISSN 0570-1716.
- Halm, Heinz (1991). Das Reich des Mahdi: Der Aufstieg der Fatimiden [The Empire of the Mahdi: The Rise of the Fatimids] (in German). Munich: C. H. Beck. ISBN 3-406-35497-1.
- Lev, Yaacov (1979). "The Fāṭimid Conquest of Egypt — Military Political and Social Aspects". Israel Oriental Studies. 9: 315–328. ISSN 0334-4401.
- Mortel, Richard T. (1991). "The Origins and Early History of the Husaynid Amirate of Madīna to the End of the Ayyūbid Period". Studia Islamica. 74 (74): 63–78. doi:10.2307/1595897. JSTOR 1595897.
