= Isa ibn Ja'far =

‘Īsá ibn Ja‘far al-Ḥasanī (Arabic: عيسى بن جعفر الحسني; died 994/5) was the second Musawid Emir of Mecca. He reigned in the late tenth century after his father Ja'far. Although the exact year he took office is not recorded, Ibn Khaldun writes that he was Emir in 366 AH (976/977). In that year the Fatimid army beset Mecca and Medina to enforce the khutbah in the name of the Fatimid caliph al-Aziz. Isa died in 384 AH (994/995) and was succeeded by his brother Abu al-Futuh. He had no descendants.

Isa ibn Ja'far Ja'farid dynasty (Hasanids)
Political offices
Preceded by Ja'far ibn Muhammad al-Hasani	Sharif and Emir of Mecca (under the Fatimid Caliphate); 980 – 995	Succeeded by Abu'l-Futuh al-Hasan ibn Ja'far
