= Idris ibn Qatadah =

13th-century Emir of Mecca (r. 1254–1270)

Idrīs ibn Qatādah ibn Idrīs al-Ḥasanī was Emir of Mecca from 1254 to 1270, with interruptions. The majority of his reign was in partnership with his grandnephew Abu Numayy ibn Abi Sa'd ibn Ali.

== Biography ==
In 1254 he deposed his nephew Ghanim ibn Rajih from the Emirate of Mecca in partnership with Abu Numayy ibn Abi Sa'd, with only three killed in the fighting. They reigned together until (c. 6 January 1255), when they were deposed by the emir al-Mubariz Ibn Birtas on behalf of al-Muzaffar of Yemen. Idris and Abu Numayy retook Mecca two months later, four nights 6 March 1255. Ibn Birtas ransomed himself and returned to Yemen.

In 1256 Idris was briefly deposed by Abu Numayy when he left Mecca to visit his brother Rajih. When he returned to Mecca with Rajih the three sharifs reconciled.

Idris was deposed a second time in c. 1268. Abu Numayy wrote to al-Zahir Baybars of Egypt, explaining that he had witnessed in Idris an inclination towards al-Muzaffar Yusuf of Yemen and his state, due to which he had expelled his uncle. After that Idris gathered his forces and returned to Mecca, the two reconciled, and Idris wrote to the Sultan expressing his loyalty.

In 1270 there again occurred a dispute between the two sharifs, in which Abu Numayy's son was killed. He fled to Yanbu, where he sought support from its Emir. After assembling an army he set out for Mecca and fought Idris at Khulays. He wounded Idris, then dismounted his horse and decapitated him.

According to al-Muyurqi, Abu Numayy was expelled from Mecca after his son was killed in Rabi I (sometime c. 18 October – c. 16 November), and he killed Idris 40 days after that. That would place Idris's death in Rabi II or Jumada I (sometime c. 26 November – c. 25 December).

Idris ibn Qatadah Banu Qatadah
Regnal titles
Preceded by Ghanim ibn Rajih	Emir of Mecca; November/December 1254 – c. 6 January 1255 with Abu Numayy ibn Abi Sa'd	Succeeded by al-Mubariz Ibn Birtas
Preceded by al-Mubariz Ibn Birtas	Emir of Mecca; 6 March 1255 – 1256 with Abu Numayy ibn Abi Sa'd	Succeeded by Abu Numayy ibn Abi Sa'd
Preceded by Abu Numayy ibn Abi Sa'd	Emir of Mecca; 1256 – 1268/1269 with Abu Numayy ibn Abi Sa'd	Succeeded by Abu Numayy ibn Abi Sa'd
Preceded by Abu Numayy ibn Abi Sa'd	Emir of Mecca; 1268/1269 – November/December 1270 with Abu Numayy ibn Abi Sa'd (1268/1269 – October/November 1270)	Succeeded by Abu Numayy ibn Abi Sa'd
