= Shukr ibn Abi al-Futuh =

Tāj al-Ma‘ālī Abū ‘Abd Allāh Shukr ibn Abī al-Futūḥ al-Ḥasan ibn Ja‘far al-Ḥasanī (Arabic: تاج المعالي أبو عبد الله شكر بن أبي الفتوح الحسن بن جعفر الحسني; d. 1061), also named Muhammad, was the fourth and last Musawid Emir of Mecca. He inherited the throne after the death of his father Abu al-Futuh in 400 AH (1010). During his reign, he declared war against the Husaynid Sharifate in Medina and brought both holy cities under his control. He died in Ramadan 453 AH (September/October 1061), He was deposed by the Sulaymanids in 403 AH (1012) AD by Abu Tayeb Daoud bin Abdul Rahman. He had one daughter; she married Abu Hashim Muhammad ibn Ja'far. Since he had no son, one of his slaves succeeded him as Emir, but the Emirate was soon captured by sharifs of the Sulaymanid dynasty. In late 455 AH (1063) Ali al-Sulayhi captured Mecca and appointed Abu Hashim Muhammad ibn Ja'far as Emir.

Shukr ibn Abi al-Futuh Ja'farid dynasty (Hasanids)
Political offices
Preceded by Abu'l-Futuh al-Hasan ibn Ja'far	Sharif and Emir of Mecca (under the Fatimid Caliphate); 1039–1061	Succeeded by End of the dynasty (Abu Tayeb as new sharif)
