= Qatada =

Qatada or Qatadah (Arabic: قتادة) is an Arabic name. It may refer to:

- Qatada ibn al-Nu'man (c. 581–c. 644), a companion of the Muslim prophet Muhammad
- Qatada ibn Di'ama (died 735), Hadiths narrator and scholar from Basra
- Qatada ibn Idris (1130–1220), Sharif of Mecca and founder of the Banu Qatada dynasty

== See also ==
- Abu Qatada al-Ansari (died c. 665), a companion of the Muslim prophet Muhammad
- Abu Qatada al-Filistini, Salafi cleric Omar Mahmoud Othman (born 1960)
