= Tahir ibn Muslim =

First Husaynid emir of Medina

Tahir ibn Muslim ibn Ubayd Allah was the first Husaynid emir, or sharif, of Medina.

He was the son of Abu Ja'far Muslim, a descendant in the ninth generation of Husayn ibn Ali. Abu Ja'far had migrated to Egypt from Medina, where the Husaynid line was prominent, and became an important figure at the court of the Ikhshidids and later the Fatimids.

Sometime shortly after his father's death in 976/7, Tahir returned to Medina, where he was quickly recognized by the rest of the Husaynids as their leader. He may have initially recognized the Abbasid caliph al-Ta'i, or the Fatimids may have engineered his rise. The Fatimid caliph al-Aziz Billah eventually sent an army to secure his allegiance.

He remained as ruler of Medina until he died in 992, being succeeded by his son al-Hasan ibn Tahir. Tahir's line was deposed and replaced by a collateral Husaynid line in 1007, led by Da'ud in al-Qasim.

== Sources ==
- Mortel, Richard T. (1991). "The Origins and Early History of the Husaynid Amirate of Madīna to the End of the Ayyūbid Period". Studia Islamica. 74 (74): 63–78. doi:10.2307/1595897. JSTOR 1595897.
- Munt, Harry (2025). "Caliphs, the Economy, and Political Separatism in the Hijāz". In Hugh Kennedy; Fanny Bessard (eds.). Land and Trade in Early Islam: The Economy of the Islamic Middle East 750–1050 CE. Oxford University Press. pp. 67–99.

Tahir ibn Muslim Husaynids
Political offices
New title	Sharif of Medina (under the Fatimid Caliphate) c. 976 – 992	Succeeded by al-Hasan ibn Tahir
