= Rajih ibn Qatadah =

13th-century Emir of Mecca (r. 1232–1241) (1254)

Rājiḥ ibn Qatādah ibn Idrīs al-Ḥasanī was Emir of Mecca under Rasulid suzerainty several times between 1232 and 1241, and briefly again in 1254. His mother belonged to the Banu Husayn of Medina.

== Opposition to Hasan ibn Qatadah ==
When his younger brother Hasan assumed the Emirate in 1220 Rajih was residing among the Bedouin outside of Mecca. He opposed his brother's rule and that year intercepted the Iraqi Hajj caravan, which was led by Aqbash, a mamluk of the Abbasid Caliph al-Nasir. Aqbash had with him a khil'ah (robe of honor) for the Emir of Mecca, and Rajih entreated Aqbash to invest him instead of his brother. Reports differ on whether or not Aqbash agreed to support Rajih but, regardless, Hasan's troops killed Aqbash and Rajih fled to Yemen. He sought the assistance of al-Malik al-Mas'ud Yusuf, the Ayyubid Emir of Yemen, son of al-Malik al-Kamil of Egypt. In 1222 Al-Mas'ud captured Mecca and deposed Hasan. He appointed Nur al-Din Umar ibn Ali ibn Rasul as Emir of Mecca, and Rajih as Emir over Halya, al-Sirrayn, and half of al-Mikhlaf.

== Emir of Mecca for al-Malik al-Mansur of Yemen ==
Mecca remained in Ayyubid hands until Rabi II 629 (January/February 1232), when Nur al-Din Umar – then al-Malik al-Mansur of Yemen – sent an army to capture Mecca accompanied by Sharif Rajih. The Ayyubid Emir fled to Yanbu and Rajih assumed the Emirate. When al-Kamil received news of the loss of Mecca, he sent out a large force from Egypt led by Fakhr al-Din ibn al-Shaykh and ordered Sharif Abu Sa'd al-Hasan, Emir of Yanbu, and Sharif Shihah, Emir of Medina, to assist in recapturing Mecca. In Ramadan 629 AH (June/July 1232) Rajih was defeated and Mecca once again fell under Ayyubid rule.

In Muharram or Safar 630 AH (October–December 1232) Rajih captured Mecca again with the assistance of Yemeni troops. In Shawwal, al-Kamil prepared an army to retake Mecca. When the Hajj season arrived Rajih left Mecca, and the Egyptian troops entered the city without resistance. The Hajj that year was under the Egyptian Emir al-Zahid, who left Mecca under the Emir Ibn al-Mujalli in the beginning of 631 AH (October 1233).

In 631 AH (1233/1234) after receiving reinforcements from al-Mansur, Rajih captured Mecca from Ibn al-Mujalli. When the Hajj season arrived Rajih left Mecca, having heard that al-Kamil was coming. After the departure of al-Kamil, Rajih returned to Mecca.

In 632 AH (1234/1235) Mecca was recaptured by an Egyptian force under the command of the Emir Asad al-Din Jughril. In 632 AH (1234/1235) and 633 AH (1235/1236) Rajih took part in two failed Rasulid expeditions to recapture Mecca.

In 635 AH (1237/1238) al-Mansur set out with a force of 1000 cavalry to retake Mecca. Rajih joined him with 300 more horsemen. They entered Mecca in Rajab (February/March 1238) after the Egyptian army fled. In that year al-Kamil of Egypt died.

In 637 AH (1239/1240) Sharif Shihah ibn Hashim, Emir of Medina, captured Mecca with a force of 1000 cavalry provided by al-Salih Ayyub of Egypt, son of al-Kamil. When al-Mansur sent an army with Rajih to recapture the city, Shihah fled. In 638 AH (1240/1241) Sharif Shihah recaptured Mecca.

In 639 AH (1241/1242) al-Mansur sent a large army with Rajih to capture Mecca. When Rajih learned that the Egyptians had been reinforced he encamped at al-Sirrayn and wrote to al-Mansur, who marched on Mecca himself. The Egyptians fled, and al-Mansur entered Mecca in Ramadan (March 1242).

Dahlan writes that al-Mansur appointed Rajih as Emir of Mecca when he captured Mecca, but other historians mention a succession of other Rasulid emirs during this period: Ibn Fayruz (1242), Fakhr al-Din al-Shallah (1242–1248), and Ibn al-Musayyib (1248–1250).

== Opposition to Abu Sa'd al-Hasan ==
When his nephew Abu Sa'd al-Hasan ibn Ali ibn Qatadah captured Mecca from Ibn al-Musayyib in 1250, Rajih fled to Yemen and stayed at al-Sirrayn. During Abu Sa'd's reign Rajih attempted to capture Mecca with assistance from the Banu Husayn of Medina, his maternal relatives. He set out from Medina with a force of 700 horsemen, but was defeated by Muhammad Abu Numayy, son of Abu Sa'd.

== Return to the Emirate ==
On the last day of 651 AH (c. 20 February 1254) Rajih took the Emirate from his nephew Jammaz ibn Hasan without fighting. He was deposed by his son Ghanim in Rabi I 652 AH (April/May 1254) without fighting. He died in 654 AH (sometime c. 31 January 1256 – c. 18 January 1257).

== Description ==
He was reportedly disproportionately tall, to the extent that his hands reached his knees while standing.

== Notes ==
Rajih ibn Qatadah Banu Qatadah Died: 1256/1257
Regnal titles
Preceded by Tughtakin	Emir of Mecca; January/February 1232 – June/July 1232	Succeeded by Tughtakin
Preceded by Tughtakin	Emir of Mecca c. November 1232 – c. August 1233	Succeeded by al-Zahid
Preceded by Ibn al-Mujalli	Emir of Mecca; 1233/1234 – c. July 1234	Succeeded by al-Kamil
Preceded by al-Kamil	Emir of Mecca c. September 1234 – May/June 1235	Succeeded by Jughril
Preceded by Jughril	Emir of Mecca; February 1238 – 1239/1240	Succeeded by Shihah ibn Hashim
Preceded by Shihah ibn Hashim	Emir of Mecca c. 1240 – 1240/1241	Succeeded by Shihah ibn Hashim
Preceded by Jammaz ibn Hasan	Emir of Mecca; February 1254 – April/May 1254	Succeeded by Ghanim ibn Rajih
