= Da'ud ibn Isa =

Emir of Mecca

Da’ūd ibn ‘Īsá ibn Fulaytah al-Ḥasanī al-‘Alawī (Arabic: داود بن عيسى بن فليتة الحسني العلوي; d. July/August 1193) was Emir of Mecca at least three times between 1175 and 1192, in opposition to his brother Mukaththir. He belonged to the sharifian dynasty known as the Hawashim.

Da'ud succeeded to the Emirate after the death of his father Isa on 2 Sha'ban 570 AH (c. 5 March 1175). Less than a year later, on the night of 15 Rajab 571 AH (c. 5 February 1176), he was deposed by his brother Mukaththir. In Dhu al-Hijjah of that year (June/July 1176) the Iraqi amir al-hajj Tashtakin al-Mustanjadi fought Mukaththir and captured Mecca. He gave custodianship of the Emirate to Qasim ibn Muhanna, the Emir of Medina. After three days Qasim surrendered the Emirate to Da'ud, after the latter agreed to Tashtakin's conditions, among which were that he abolish the mukus (non-Islamic taxes). However, reports indicate that Mukaththir was again Emir the following year, in 572 AH (1176/1177).

At some point the Emirate returned to Da'ud, as al-Dhahabi reports that he was Emir in 587 AH (1191/1192). He writes that in that year Da'ud looted the Kaaba of its wealth and stripped the Black Stone of its silver collar. When the amir al-hajj arrived he deposed Da'ud and installed Mukaththir as Emir. According to al-Dhahabi, Da'ud spent the rest of his days at Nakhlah, where he died in Rajab 589 AH (July/August 1193). Najm Ibn Fahd writes that he died on Monday, 14 Sha'ban 589 AH (23 August 1193). He had a son named Ahmad, as evidenced by a gravestone seen by al-Fasi.

== Sources ==
Da'ud ibn Isa Hawashim
Regnal titles
Preceded by Isa	Emir of Mecca c. 5 Mar 1175 – c. 5 Feb 1176	Succeeded by Mukaththir
Preceded by Qasim ibn Muhanna	Emir of Mecca; Jul 1176 – 1176/77	Succeeded by Mukaththir
Preceded by Mukaththir	Emir of Mecca ? – 1191/92	Succeeded by Mukaththir
