= Isa ibn Shihah =

Husaynid Emir of Medina from 1249/50 to 1251/2

Īsā ibn Shīḥah ibn Hāshim al-Ḥusaynī was the Husaynid Emir of Medina from 1249/50 to 1251/2. He served as the deputy of his father, Shihah ibn Hashim, and succeeded him after the latter's assassination. He was able to rebuff the attempt of a rival branch of the ruling dynasty, the descendants of Jammaz ibn Qasim ibn Muhanna, to seize power, but was overthrown by his two brothers, Jammaz and Munif, who succeeded him as co-rulers. Isa retired to private life, dying at Medina in 1284/5.

== Sources ==
- Mortel, Richard T. (1994). "The Ḥusaynid Amirate of Madīna during the Mamlūk Period". Studia Islamica. 80: 97–123. JSTOR 1595853.
