= Hashim ibn Fulaytah =

Ancient leader of Mecca, modern day Saudi Arabia

Hāshim ibn Fulaytah al-Ḥasanī al-‘Alawī (Arabic: هاشم بن فليتة الحسني العلوي; d. 1155) was the fourth Emir of Mecca from the sharifian dynasty of the Hawashim. He succeeded his father Fulaytah after the latter's death in 1133. He died in late 549 AH (1155) and was succeeded by his son Qasim.

== Sources ==
Hashim ibn Fulaytah Hawashim
Regnal titles
| Preceded by Fulaytah | Emir of Mecca; 1133–1155 | Succeeded by Qasim |
