= Muhammad ibn Abd Allah ibn Hasan =

Emir of Mecca and ruler of the Hejaz from 1631 to 1632

Muḥammad ibn ‘Abd Allāh محمد بن عبد الله

Emir of Mecca
- Reign: 29 August 1631 – 17 March 1632
- Predecessor: Abd Allah ibn Hasan
- Successor: Nami ibn Abd al-Muttalib
- Co-Emir: Zayd ibn Muhsin
- Died: 17 March 1632; Near Wadi al-Biyar, Hejaz
- House: Banu Qatadah

Muḥammad ibn ‘Abd Allāh ibn Ḥasan ibn Abī Numayy (Arabic: محمد بن عبد الله بن حسن بن أبي نمي) was Emir of Mecca and ruler of the Hejaz from 1631 to 1632, in partnership with Zayd ibn Muhsin.

He was the son of the Emir of Mecca, Sharif Abd Allah ibn Hasan. On Friday, 1 Safar 1041 AH (29 August 1631), Abd Allah abdicated and appointed Muhammad and Zayd ibn Muhsin as his successors.

Muhammad and Zayd reigned together until Sha'ban (March 1632), when Mecca was captured by a rebel Yemeni army led by the commanders Kor Mahmud and Ali Bey. The rebels allied with Nami ibn Abd al-Muttalib, a rival cousin, and marched on Mecca after they were refused permission to enter the city on their way to Egypt. Muhammad and Zayd, accompanied by Mustafa Bey, governor of Jeddah, fought the rebels and were defeated near Wadi al-Biyar on Wednesday, 25 Sha'ban (17 March 1632). Muhammad was killed along with a group of the ashraf, two hundred of his men, and most of the Ottoman garrison. The ashraf returned his body to Mecca that same day, bathed him, prayed over him, then buried him in al-Ma'lah.

After Zayd fled with the remaining ashraf to Wadi Marr al-Zahran, Nami entered Mecca with the rebels and took possession of the Emirate.

== Notes ==
Muḥammad ibn ‘Abd Allāh ibn Ḥasan ibn Abī Numayy al-Abadilah; Branch of Banu Qatadah
Regnal titles
| Preceded by Abd Allah ibn Hasan | Sharif and Emir of Mecca; 29 Aug 1631 – 17 Mar 1632 with Zayd ibn Muhsin | Succeeded by Nami ibn Abd al-Muttalib |
