= Qasim ibn Hashim =

Emir of Mecca (d. 1162)

Qāsim ibn Hāshim ibn Fulaytah al-Ḥasanī al-‘Alawī (Arabic: قاسم بن هاشم بن فليتة الحسني العلوي; d. 1162) was Emir of Mecca from 1155 to 1161, and briefly in 1162. He belonged to the sharifian dynasty known as the Hawashim. He was preceded by his father Hashim, and succeeded by his uncle Isa ibn Fulaytah.

== Sources ==
Qasim ibn Hashim Hawashim
Regnal titles
Preceded by Hashim	Emir of Mecca; 1155–1161	Succeeded by Isa
Preceded by Isa	Emir of Mecca; Aug/Sep 1162	Succeeded by Isa
