= Abu'l-Futuh al-Hasan ibn Ja'far =

Abu'l-Futuh al-Hasan ibn Ja'far (Arabic: أبو الفتوح الحسن بن جعفر) was the Sharif of Mecca for the Fatimid Caliphate from 994/5 until 1010. He was also briefly proclaimed as an anti-caliph in a rebellion against the Fatimid Caliphate in Palestine in 1010.

Abu al-Futuh succeeded his brother Isa as Emir of Mecca in 384 AH (994/5 CE). He was a member of the Ja'farid dynasty, a Hasanid family that had come to rule Mecca c. 968. The family may have had Zaydi leanings, and recognized the suzerainty of the Fatimid Caliphate.

In July 1010, at the instigation of Abu'l-Qasim al-Husayn ibn Ali al-Maghribi, a former Fatimid vizier, he was briefly acclaimed as anti-caliph with the title of al-Rashid bi-llah ("Righteous with God") during the Jarrahid-led Bedouin revolt against the Fatimid rule in Palestine. He raised a considerable sum of money and joined the rebels in their capital of Ramla, where he was initially warmly received and acclaimed as "Commander of the Faithful". Soon, however, the money he had brought with him ran out and the Jarrahids ceased to respect him, while they were willing to receive gifts and money from the Fatimid Caliph, al-Hakim bi-Amr Allah. Disheartened, Hasan returned to Mecca and Fatimid allegiance, while the Jarrahid rebellion was crushed by the Fatimid troops in late summer 1010. The motives for his revolt are not entirely clear. On one part they were practical: the Hejaz had suffered due to the cessation of grain shipments, as well as monetary subsidies, from Egypt for the few years preceding the revolt, and the sources explicitly mention that this had caused grievances on the part of al-Hasan. However, the unprecedented decision to actually proclaim a counter-caliphate clearly had ideological motivation as well, being possibly prodded by al-Hakim's demand in 1005 to ritually curse the first two Rashidun caliphs across the Fatimid domains.

Abu'l-Futuh also briefly occupied Medina, ruled by a rival Husaynid family, the Banu Muhanna.

Abu al-Futuh died in 430 AH (1038/9), as mentioned by Ibn al-Athir. He was succeeded as Emir by his only son Shukr After his removal in the year 400 AH (1010) AD.

== Sources ==
- Bianquis, Thierry (1986). Damas et la Syrie sous la domination fatimide (359-468/969-1076): essai d'interprétation de chroniques arabes médiévales. Tome premier (in French). Damascus: Institut français de Damas. ISBN 978-2-35159130-7.
- Gil, Moshe (1997) [1983]. A History of Palestine, 634–1099. Translated by Ethel Broido. Cambridge: Cambridge University Press. ISBN 0-521-59984-9.
- Ibn Fahd, ‘Izz al-Dīn ‘Abd al-‘Azīz ibn ‘Umar ibn Muḥammad (1986). Shaltūt, Fahīm Muḥammad (ed.). غاية المرام بأخبار سلطنة البلد الحرام (in Arabic). Vol. 1 (1st ed.). Mecca: Jāmi‘at Umm al-Qurá, Markaz al-Baḥth al-‘Ilmī wa-Iḥyā’ al-Turāth al-Islāmī, Kullīyat al-Sharīʻah wa-al-Dirāsāt al-Islāmīyah.
- Landau-Tasseron, Ella (2010). "Arabia". In Robinson, Chase F. (ed.). The New Cambridge History of Islam, Volume 1: The Formation of the Islamic World, Sixth to Eleventh Centuries. Cambridge: Cambridge University Press. pp. 397–447. ISBN 978-0-521-83823-8.
- Mortel, Richard T. (1991). "The Origins and Early History of the Husaynid Amirate of Madīna to the End of the Ayyūbid Period". Studia Islamica. 74: 63–78. JSTOR 1595897.
- Mortel, Richard T. (1987). "Zaydi Shiism and the Hasanid Sharifs of Mecca". International Journal of Middle East Studies. 19 (4): 455–472. doi:10.1017/S0020743800056518. JSTOR 163211.

Abu'l-Futuh al-Hasan ibn Ja'far Ja'farid dynasty (Hasanids)
Political offices
Preceded by Isa ibn Ja'far	Sharif and Emir of Mecca (under the Fatimid Caliphate); 994/5 – 1038/9	Succeeded by Shukr ibn Abi al-Futuh
