= Al-Mas'ud Yusuf =

Ayyubid emir of Yemen and Hejaz from 1215 to 1229

Al-Malik al-Mas‘ūd Ṣalāḥ al-Dīn Abū al-Muẓaffar Yūsuf ibn Muḥammad (Arabic: الملك المسعود صلاح الدين أبو المظفر يوسف بن محمد; 1201–1229) was the sixth and final Ayyubid ruler of Yemen, from 1215 to 1229.

Al-Mas'ud Yusuf Ayyubid dynasty Born: 1201 Died: 1229
Regnal titles
Preceded by Al-Muzaffar Sulayman	Ruler of Yemen; 1215–1229	Succeeded by Al-Mansur Umar
