= Ahmad ibn Abd al-Muttalib =

Aḥmad ibn ‘Abd al-Muṭṭalib أحمد بن عبد المطلب

Emir of Mecca
- Reign: 21 May 1628 – 22 September 1629
- Predecessor: Muhsin ibn Husayn
- Successor: Mas'ud ibn Idris
- Died: 22 September 1629; Mecca, Hejaz
- House: Banu Qatadah

Aḥmad ibn ‘Abd al-Muṭṭalib ibn Ḥasan ibn Abī Numayy (Arabic: أحمد بن عبد المطلب بن حسن بن أبي نمي) was Emir of Mecca and ruler of the Hejaz from 1628 to 1629.

He was proclaimed Emir in Jeddah in late Safar 1037 AH (November 1627) by Kurji Ahmad Pasha, the governor of Yemen, after the latter had a dispute with Sharif Muhsin ibn Husayn. After Muhsin surrendered, Ahmad entered Mecca as Emir on Sunday, 17 Ramadan 1037 AH (21 May 1628).

He was assassinated by order of Kansuh Pasha, governor of Yemen, in the 5th hour of the night, on Sunday, 5 Safar 1039 (around 10–11 pm on Saturday night, 22 September 1629).

== Notes ==
Aḥmad ibn ‘Abd al-Muṭṭalib ibn Ḥasan ibn Abī Numayy Banu Qatadah
Regnal titles
Preceded by Muhsin ibn Husayn	Emir of Mecca; 21 May 1628 – 22 Sep 1629	Succeeded by Mas'ud ibn Idris
