= Hamzah ibn Wahas =

- Reign: 451 AH (1058 AD) – 454 AH (1062 AD)
- Born: Mecca, Hijaz
- Died: 486 AH (1093 AD); Al-Sulaimani's Mikhlaf
Names
- Hamzah bin Wahas bin Abu Tayeb Daoud bin Abdul Rahman
- Tribe: Quraysh (Banu Hashim)
- Religion: Islam

Sharif Hamzah bin Wahas bin Abi Tayyib ruled Mecca from 451 AH (1058 AD) until 454 AH (1062 AD) during the Fatimid Caliphate. He was the grandson of Abu Tayeb Daoud bin Abdul Rahman. Hamzah ibn Wahas died in 486 AH (1093 AD) in Al-Sulaimani's Mikhlaf.

== Ancestry ==
In Arabic, the word "ibn" or "bin" is equivalent to "son of." This is occasionally to connect generations of ancestors. Hamzah ibn Wahas's entire name details his lineage to the rift between the Sunni and Shia groups.

His full name is Hamzah ibn Wahas bin Abu Tayyib Dawood bin Abdul Rahman bin Abu al-Fatik Abdullah bin Dawood bin Suleiman bin Abdullah al-Ridha bin Musa bin Abdullah al-Kamil bin al-Hassan Muthanna bin Hassan al-Sibt bin Ali ibn Abi Talib.

== Reign ==
Sharif Hamzah ibn Wahas took command of Mecca in 451 AH (1058 AD). He was the last of the Sulaymanid's rule of Banu Hashim. He was overthrown in 454 AH (1062 AD) by Ali bin Muhammad Al-Sulayhi, the sultan of the Sulayhid dynasty in Yemen.
