= Isa ibn Fulaytah =

Emir of Mecca (d. 1175)

‘Īsá ibn Fulaytah al-Ḥasanī al-‘Alawī (Arabic: عيسى بن فليتة الحسني العلوي; d. c. 5 March 1175) was Emir of Mecca from 1161 to 1175. He ruled during the reigns of the Fatimid caliph al-Adid and the Ayyubid sultan Saladin. He belonged to the sharifian dynasty known as the Hawashim. He was preceded by his nephew Qasim ibn Hashim, and succeeded by his son Da'ud. He died on 2 Sha'ban 570 AH (c. 5 March 1175).

== Sources ==
Isa ibn Fulaytah Hawashim
Regnal titles
Preceded by Qasim	Emir of Mecca; 1161 – Aug/Sep 1162	Succeeded by Qasim
Preceded by Qasim	Emir of Mecca; Aug/Sep 1162 – c. 30 Sep 1170	Succeeded by Malik
Preceded by Malik	Emir of Mecca c. 30 Sep 1170 – c. 5 March 1175	Succeeded by Da'ud
