= Fulaytah ibn Qasim =

Third Emir of Mecca (d. 1133)

Fulaytah ibn Qāsim al-Ḥasanī al-‘Alawī (Arabic: فليتة بن قاسم الحسني العلوي; d. June/July 1133) was the third Emir of Mecca from the sharifian dynasty of the Hawashim. He succeeded his father Qasim after the latter's death in 1123 or 1124. He died in Sha'ban 527 AH (June/July 1133) and was succeeded by his son Hashim.

== Sources ==
Fulaytah ibn Qasim Hawashim
Regnal titles
Preceded by Qasim	Emir of Mecca; 1123/24 – Jun/Jul 1133	Succeeded by Hashim
