= Abd Allah ibn Hasan =

Emir of Mecca and ruler of the Hejaz from 1630 to 1631

‘Abd Allāh ibn Ḥasan عبد الله بن حسن

Emir of Mecca
- Reign: 3 December 1630 – 29 August 1631
- Predecessor: Mas'ud ibn Idris
- Successor: Muhammad ibn Abd Allah; Zayd ibn Muhsin
- Died: 1 January 1632; Mecca, Hejaz
- House: Banu Qatadah

‘Abd Allāh ibn Ḥasan ibn Abī Numayy (Arabic: عبد الله بن حسن بن أبي نمي) (died 1 January 1632) was Emir of Mecca and ruler of the Hejaz from 1630 to 1631.

He was elected Emir by agreement of the ashraf on Tuesday, 28 Rabi II 1040 AH (3 December 1630), after the death of Mas'ud ibn Idris. At the time he was the eldest of the House of Abu Numayy. Word was sent to Istanbul, and he received a decree from Sultan Murad IV confirming his election as Emir.

On Friday, 1 Safar 1041 AH (29 August 1631), Abd Allah abdicated in favour of his son Muhammad ibn Abd Allah and his great-nephew Zayd ibn Muhsin, on the proviso that his name continued to be mentioned in the du'a from the minbar.

He died on Friday night, 10 Jumada II 1041 AH (the night of 1–2 January 1632). He was buried in the qubba of his father, Sharif Hasan ibn Abi Numayy.

== Issue ==
He had nine sons:

- Muhammad
- Ahmad
- Hamud
- Husayn
- Hashim
- Thaqabah
- Zamil
- Mubarak
- Zayn al-Abidin

He is the ancestor of the Abadilah clan.

== Notes ==
‘Abd Allāh ibn Ḥasan ibn Abī Numayy Banu Qatadah
Regnal titles
| Preceded by Mas'ud ibn Idris | Emir of Mecca; 3 December 1630 – 29 August 1631 | Succeeded by Muhammad ibn Abd Allah; Zayd ibn Muhsin |
