= Qasim ibn Abi Hashim =

Abū Fulaytah Qāsim أبو فليتة قاسم

Emir of Mecca
- Reign: 1094 – 1123
- Predecessor: Muhammad
- Successor: Fulaytah
- Died: 1123

Abū Fulaytah Qāsim ibn Abī Hāshim Muḥammad al-Ḥasanī al-‘Alawī (Arabic: أبو فليتة قاسم بن أبي هاشم محمد الحسني العلوي; d. 1123/1124) was the second Emir of Mecca from the sharifian dynasty of the Hawashim. He succeeded his father Abu Hashim after the latter's death in 487 AH AH (1094). He died in 1123 or 1124, as Ibn Fahd writes:

And he died — as mentioned by al-Dhahabi — in Safar of the year 518, and several have mentioned his death in this year. And I have seen in some chronicles: that he died on the 17th day of the said month. And in Tarikh Ibn al-Athir: that he died in the year 517. And God know what is correct.

He was succeeded by his son Fulaytah.

== Sources ==
Qasim ibn Abi Hashim Hawashim
Regnal titles
Preceded by Abu Hashim	Emir of Mecca; 1094 – 1123/24	Succeeded by Fulaytah
