= Al-Mansur Umar =

13th-century Rasulid Sultan of Yemen

Al-Malik al-Manṣūr Nūr al-Dīn Abū al-Fatḥ ‘Umar ibn ‘Alī ibn Rasūl was the first Rasulid Sultan of Yemen, from 1229 to 1249.

== Emir of Mecca ==
In the month of Rabi' al-awwal 619 AH (April/May 1222) al-Mas'ud Yusuf captured Mecca from Hasan ibn Qatadah. After the Hajj was complete (in January/February 1223) he returned to Yemen and left Nur al-Din Umar as his deputy in Mecca with a contingent of 300 horsemen. In 625 AH (1228) al-Mas'ud recalled him to Yemen and appointed in his place Husam al-Din Yaqut.

Regnal titles
Preceded by al-Mas'ud Yusuf	Sultan of Yemen; 1228–1249	Succeeded by al-Muzaffar Yusuf I
Preceded by Hasan ibn Qatadah	Emir of Mecca; 1222–1228	Succeeded by Husam al-Din Yaqut
