= Abu Hashim Muhammad ibn Ja'far =

Abū Hāshim Muḥammad ibn Ja‘far أبو هاشم محمد بن جعفر

Emir of Mecca
- Reign: 1063 – 1094
- Successor: Qasim
- Died: 1094
- House: Hashimids
- Father: Ja'far ibn Muhammad ibn Abd Allah

Abū Hāshim Muḥammad ibn Ja‘far al-Ḥasanī al-‘Alawī (Arabic: أبو هاشم محمد بن جعفر الحسني العلوي; d. 1094/1095) was the first Emir of Mecca from the sharifian dynasty of the Hawashim. He was appointed Emir by Ali al-Sulayhi in 455 AH (1063) and died in 487 AH (1094) over the age of 70.

== Biography ==
In 1070, the Shiite Fatimid Caliphate, the nominal overlord of Mecca and Media, was in crisis due to inner turmoil and rebellions and stopped sending the yearly donations to the cities. The same year, the Sunnite Seljuk Sultan Alp Arslan marched on Fatimid Syria and send bribes to Abū Hāshim Muḥammad to convince him to change the khutbah in the name of the Shiite Fatimid Caliph to the Sunnite Abbasid Caliph, which Abū Hāshim Muḥammad agreed to on 15 April 1071. Shortly after Badr al-Jamali became Fatimid vizier in July 1074, two Fatimid ambassadors berated Abū Hāshim Muḥammad for having changed the khutba, but did not achieve a change back. A year later, al-Jamali sent another unsuccessful envoy to Abū Hāshim Muḥammad, after which al-Jamali approached some relatives of the sharif and offered to make one of them sharif instead of Abū Hāshim. Finally, the al-Jamali's bribes and especially the dependency of Mecca and Medina on Egyptian grain resulted in Abū Hāshim changing his mind and thus the khutbah was changed again to the name of the Fatimid Caliph in 1075.

Ibn al-Athir writes, "There was nothing about him that was praiseworthy." Al-Dhahabi writes, "He was unjust, lacking in goodness." He was succeeded by his son Qasim.

== Ancestry ==
He was Abu Hashim Muhammad ibn Ja'far ibn Muhammad ibn Abd Allah ibn Abi Hashim Muhammad ibn al-Husayn ibn Muhammad al-Tha'ir ibn Musa al-Thani ibn Abd Allah al-Shaykh al-Salih ibn Musa al-Jawn ibn Abd Allah al-Mahd ibn Hasan al-Muthanna ibn al-Hasan ibn Ali.

== Sources ==
- Halm, Heinz (2014). Kalifen und Assassinen: Ägypten und der vordere Orient zur Zeit der ersten Kreuzzüge, 1074–1171 [Caliphs and Assassins: Egypt and the Near East at the Time of the First Crusades, 1074–1171] (in German). Munich: C.H. Beck. ISBN 978-3-406-66163-1.
