= Hasanids =

Descendants of Hasan ibn Ali, grandson of Muhammad

Hasanids الحسني
- Hashemite Arab Tribe
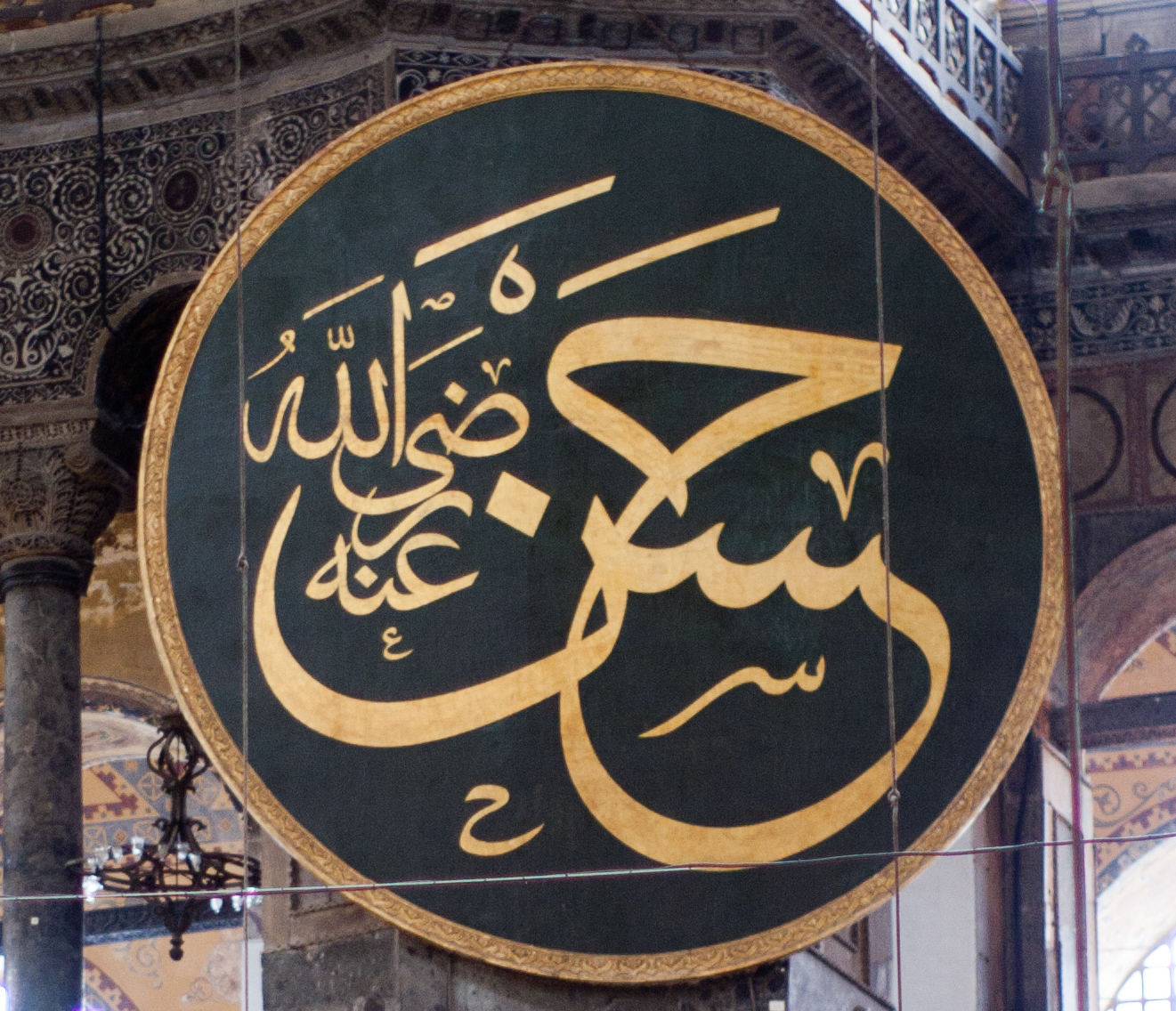
- Medallion bearing the name of Hasan inscribed with Islamic calligraphy in Hagia Sophia, Istanbul, Turkey.
- Ethnicity: Arab
- Nisba: al-Hasani
- Location: Arabia
- Descended from: Hasan ibn Ali
- Parent tribe: Banu Hashim
- Demonym: Hasanis
- Branches: Qatadah; Hashemites; Bolkiah; Alawi/Alaoui (Morocco); Rassids; Idrisids; Qatadids; Abadilah; Sulaymanids
- Religion: Sunni Islam and Shia Islam

The Ḥasanids (Arabic: بنو الحسن, romanized: Banū al-Ḥasan or حسنيون, Ḥasanīyyūn) are the descendants of Ḥasan ibn ʿAlī, brother of Ḥusayn ibn ʿAlī and grandson of Muhammad. They are a branch of the Alids (the descendants of ʿAlī ibn Abī Ṭālib), and one of the two most important branches of the ashrāf (the other being the descendants of Ḥasan's brother Ḥusayn ibn ʿAlī, the Ḥusaynids).

In Morocco, the term is particularly applied to the descendants of Muhammad al-Nafs al-Zakiyya, to distinguish them from the Idrisid dynasty, which is also of Ḥasanid descent. The Moroccan Ḥasanids proper have produced two dynasties, the Saadi dynasty, and the Alawite dynasty, which still reigns over the country.

== Dynasties ==
Notable Ḥasanid dynasties in the Muslim world include:

- Alawite dynasty of Morocco
- Alavid dynasty of Tabaristan
- Banu Ukhaidhir of Central Arabia
- Bolkiah dynasty of Brunei
- Hammudid dynasty of Southern Spain
- Idrisid dynasty of Morocco
- the various dynasties providing the Sharifs of Mecca; including the Hashemites (Banu Qatadah) of the Hejaz, Syria, and Iraq, now ruling only in Jordan
- Rassid dynasty of Yemen
- Saadi dynasty of Morocco
- Senussid dynasty of Algeria and Libya
- Sulaymanids of Mecca, Jizan, and Yemen
- Sulaymanid dynasty of Western Algeria

== Sources ==
- Brett, Michael (2001). The Rise of the Fatimids: The World of the Mediterranean and the Middle East in the Fourth Century of the Hijra, Tenth Century CE. The Medieval Mediterranean. Vol. 30. Leiden and Boston: Brill Publishers. ISBN 978-90-04-47337-9. ISSN 0928-5520.
- Deverdun, G. (1971). "Ḥasanī". In Bosworth, C. E.; van Donzel, E. J.; Heinrichs, W. P.; Lewis, B.; Pellat, Ch.; Schacht, J. (eds.). Encyclopaedia of Islam, Second Edition. Vol. 3. Leiden and Boston: Brill Publishers. pp. 256–257. doi:10.1163/1573-3912_islam_SIM_2780. ISBN 978-90-04-16121-4.
