= Banu Qatadah =

Hasanid dynasty

Banu Qatadah بنو قتادة
- Hassanid Arab tribe
- Banner of the Sharifate of Mecca
- Descended from: Qatādah ibn Idris ibn Muta'in ibn Abd al-Karim ibn Issā ibn Hussein ibn Suleiman ibn Ali ibn Abd Allah ibn Muḥammad ath-Thāʿīr ibn Mūsā II ibn Abd Allah as-Sālih ibn Musa al-Jawn ibn Abd Allah al-Mahd ibn Hassan II ibn Hassan ibn Ali ibn Abu Talib
- Religion: Islam

The Banu Qatadah (Arabic: بنو قتادة, romanized: Banū Qatādah, lit. 'Sons of Qatadah'), or the Qatadids (Arabic: القتاديون, romanized: al-Qatādayūn), were a dynasty of Hasanid sharifs that held the Sharifate of Mecca continuously from 1201 until its abolition in 1925.

== History ==
The Qatadids were the last of four dynasties of Hasanid sharifs (preceded by the Jafarids/Musawids, Sulaymanids, and the Hawashim) that all together ruled Mecca since about the mid-10th century. The progenitor of the dynasty was Qatadah ibn Idris, who took possession of the holy city from the Hawashim in 1201. The Emirate remained in the possession of his descendants until 1925 when the last Sharif of Mecca, Ali ibn al-Husayn, surrendered the Kingdom of Hejaz to Ibn Saud, Sultan of Nejd. The House of Bolkiah, which rules Brunei, claims Qatadid descent and Sayyid status from their ancestor Sharif Ali's grandfather Emir Rumaythah.

== See also ==
- Qatada
