= Princess Badiya bint Ali =

Iraqi princess (1920-2020)

Badiya bint Ali
- Born: 24 January 1920; Damascus, Syria
- Died: 9 May 2020 (aged 100); London, United Kingdom
- Spouse: Sharif al-Hussein bin Ali Bey (m. 1949)
- Issue: Sharif Muhammad; Sharif Abdullah; Sharif Ali
- House: House of Hashem
- Father: Ali bin Hussein
- Mother: Nafissa Khanum

Princess Badiya bint Ali (24 January 1920 – 9 May 2020) was a Hejazi-Iraqi princess and one of the last surviving Iraqi royals following the 1958 coup. She was the daughter of Ali, King of Hejaz and Princess Nafissa, sister of Crown Prince 'Abd al-Ilah, and the aunt of King Faisal II of Iraq.

== Life ==
Princess Badiya (or Badia) was born in Damascus.

She spent her childhood in Mecca. Her father was deposed in 1924, and she followed her family in exile to Iraq, where her uncle had been made king in 1921.

Her brother, Abd al-Ilah served as regent of Iraq for their nephew king Faisal II, for whom she and especially her sister Abadiya bint Ali acted as mother figures.

She married her relative, Sharif al-Hussein bin Ali bin Abdullah bin Muhammad bin Abd al-Mu'in in 1949.

In 1958, her brother, sister, and the rest of the royal family were murdered in the massacre of the royal family during the 14 July Revolution. She herself was not killed because she had not been present in the Royal Al-Rehab Palace when the massacre took place. She sought refuge in the Saudi Embassy in Baghdad, which arranged a safe flight for her, her husband, and her sons to Cairo, Egypt.

Afterwards, she and her family lived in exile; she settled in Switzerland and eventually in London, the United Kingdom. She died in London on 9 May 2020 at the age of 100. Iraq's president Barham Salih sent condolences to her now-deceased son Sharif Ali bin al-Hussein, who was an advocate for reinstating the monarchy in Iraq as he considered himself to be the rightful heir to the throne.

In 2002 she published her memoirs, "Memoirs of the heiress of thrones" (written by Faeq Sheikh Ali), which provides a valuable insight into the life of the Iraqi royal family.
