= Princess Jalila of Hejaz =

Hijazi princess

Jalila bint Ali
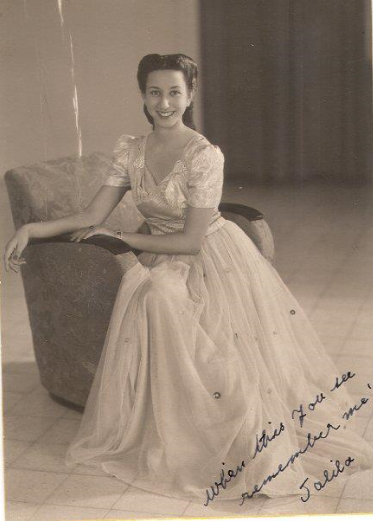
- Born: 1923; Mecca, Ottoman Empire
- Died: 29 December 1955 (aged 31–32); Bagdad Hospital
- Burial: Iraqi Royal Cemetery, al-'Adhamiyya
- House: House of Hashem
- Father: Ali bin Hussein
- Mother: Nafissa Khanum

Princess Jalila of Hejaz (1923 – 29 December 1955) was a Hijazi princess. She was the daughter of Ali, King of Hejaz and Princess Nafeesa. Her elder sister was Aliya, Queen of Iraq, wife of King Ghazi of Iraq and mother of King Faisal II of Iraq. Her brother was Abdullah, regent and crown prince of Iraq.

== Life ==
Her father was deposed in 1925, and she followed her family in exile to Iraq, were her uncle had been made king in 1921.

Her brother 'Abd al-Ilah became regent of Iraq for their nephew king Faisal II in 1939.

She died in 1955 from extensive burns suffered when she lit an oil (or paraffine) stove.

In 1958, her brother, sister and the rest of the royal family were murdered in the massacre of the royal family during the 14 July Revolution.
