= Ali bin Hussein, King of Hejaz =

King of Hejaz and Grand Sharif of Mecca (1879–1935)

Ali bin Hussein GBE علي بن الحسين بن علي الهاشمي
- Custodian of the Two Holy Mosques
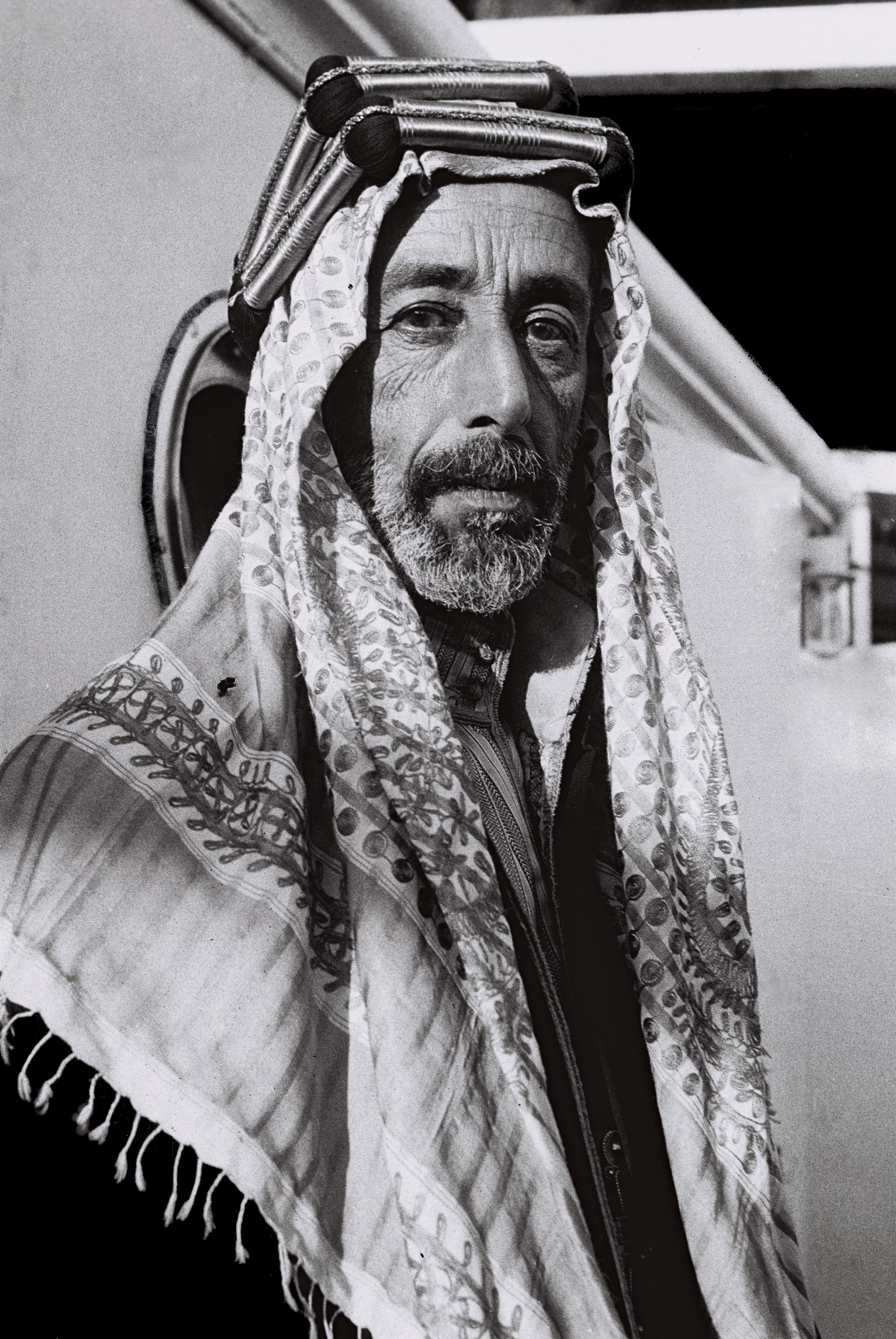
- Photograph by Zoltan Kluger, 1933

King of Hejaz Sharif of Mecca
- Reign: 3 October 1924 – 19 December 1925
- Predecessor: Hussein bin Ali
- Successor: Ibn Saud (as King of Hejaz); Sharifate abolished
- Prime Minister: Abdallah Siraj

Prime Minister of Hejaz
- Reign: 10 June 1916 – 3 October 1924
- Predecessor: Office established
- Successor: Abdallah Siraj
- Monarch: Hussein
- Deputy: Abdallah Siraj
- Born: 1879; Mecca, Hejaz, Ottoman Empire
- Died: 13 February 1935 (aged 55–56); Baghdad, Kingdom of Iraq
- Burial: Iraqi Royal Cemetery, al-'Adhamiyya
- Spouse: Nafissa Khanum (m. 1906)
- Issue: Princess Abdiya; Aliya, Queen of Iraq; Abd al-Ilah, Crown Prince of Iraq; Princess Badiya; Princess Jalila
- House: Hashemite
- Father: Hussein bin Ali
- Mother: Abdiya bint Abdullah
- Religion: Sunni Islam

Ali bin Hussein bin Ali al-Hashimi (Arabic: علي بن الحسين بن علي الهاشمي, romanized: ʿAlī ibn al-Ḥusayn ibn ʿAlī al-Hāshimī; 1879 – 13 February 1935), was King of Hejaz and Grand Sharif of Mecca from October 1924 until he was deposed by Ibn Saud in December 1925. He was the eldest son of King Hussein bin Ali and a scion of the Hashemite family. With the passing of the kingship from his father he also became the heir to the title of caliph, but he did not adopt the office and the style of caliph.

== Early life ==
The eldest son of Hussein, Ali bin Hussein was born in Mecca and was educated at Ghalata Serai College (Galatasaray High School) in Istanbul. His father was appointed Grand Sharif of Mecca by the Ottoman Empire in 1908. However, his relationship with the Young Turks in control of the Empire increasingly became strained, and, in 1916, he became one of the leaders of the Arab Revolt against Turkish rule. Following the Revolt's success, Hussein made himself the first King of Hejaz with British support. While Hussein's sons Abdullah and Faisal were made kings of Jordan and Iraq, respectively, Ali remained the heir to his father's lands in Arabia.

== Ruling Hejaz ==
King Hussein soon found himself embroiled in fighting with the House of Saud, based in Riyadh. Following military defeats by Abdulaziz ibn Saud, King Hussein abdicated all of his secular titles to Ali on 3 October 1924. (Hussein had previously awarded himself the religious title of Caliph in March of that year.)

In December of the following year, Saudi forces finally overran the Hashemite Kingdom of Hejaz, which they eventually incorporated into the Kingdom of Saudi Arabia. Ali and his family fled to Iraq.

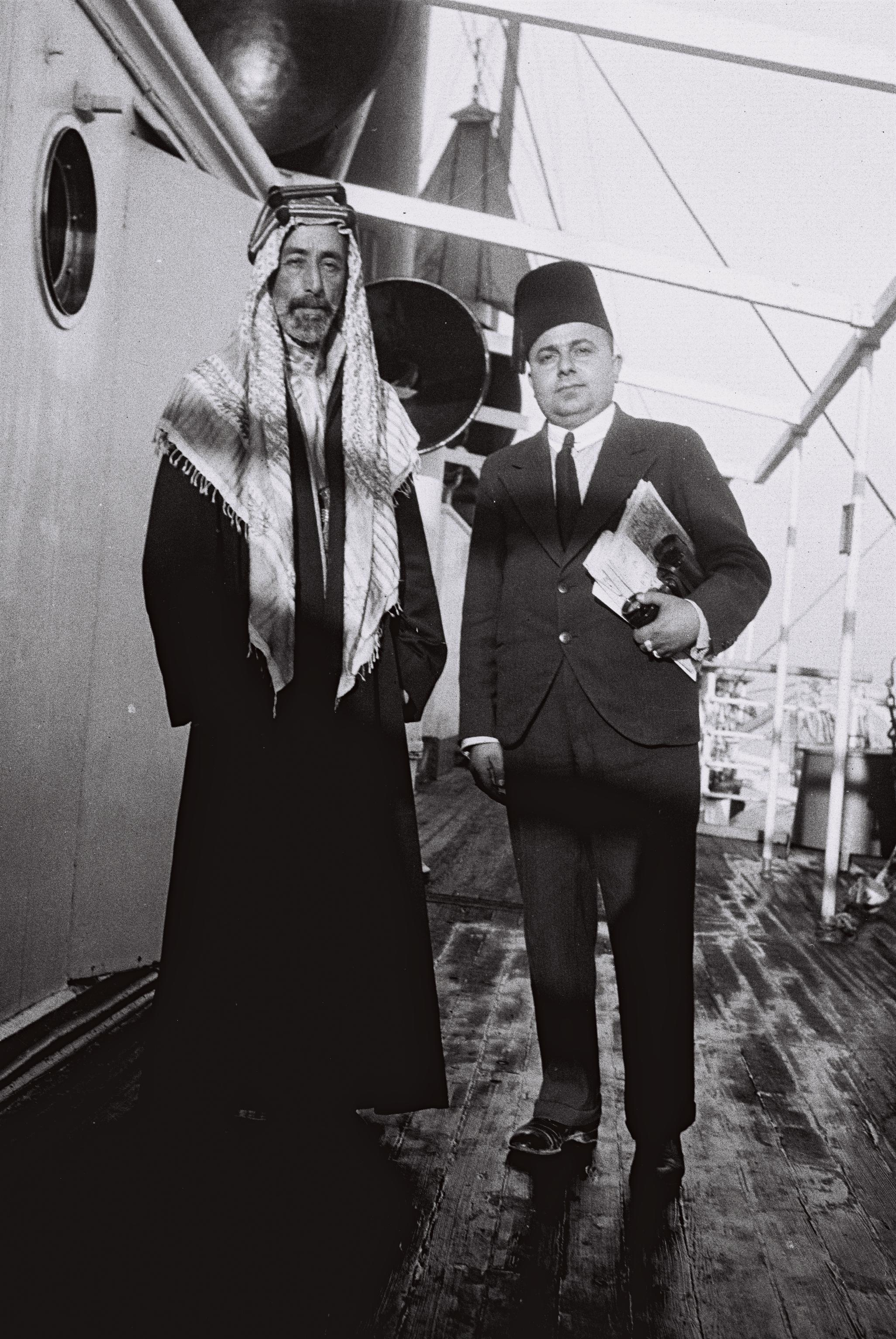
Ali bin Hussein with Daoud El-Issa, journalist and manager of the Falastin newspaper, aboard a ship at Jaffa, Mandatory Palestine in 1933

Ali bin Hussein died in Baghdad in the Hashemite Kingdom of Iraq in 1935. He had four daughters and one son, 'Abd al-Ilah, who went on to become the regent of the Kingdom of Iraq during the minority of King Faisal II.

== Marriage and children ==
In 1906 Ali married Nafissa Khanum, daughter of Emir Abdullah bin Muhammad Pasha, Grand Sharif and Emir of Mecca at Yeniköy, Bosphorus. They had one son and four daughters:

- Princess Khadija Abdiya – born 1907 – died 14 July 1958.
- Princess Aliya – born 1911 – died 21 December 1950, married her first cousin, Ghazi I King of Iraq, becoming Queen Aliya of Iraq.
- Crown Prince Abd al-Ilah – born 14 November 1913 – died 14 July 1958, married three times first to Melek el-Din Fauzi in 1936 divorced in 1940, then to Faiza al-Tarabulsi in 1948 divorced 1950 and finally to Hiyam 'Abdu'l-Ilah in 1958.
- Princess Badiya – born June 1920 - died London 9 May 2020, married Sharif Al-Hussein bin Ali. They had a son, Sharif Ali bin Al-Hussein and 2 daughters.
- Princess Jalila – born 1923 – died 28 December 1955, married Sharif Dr. Ahmad Hazim Bey.

== Ancestry ==
Hashemites

Hashim (eponymous ancestor)
Abd al-Muttalib
Abu Talib	Abdallah
Muhammad (Islamic prophet)
Ali (fourth caliph)	Fatimah
Hasan (fifth caliph)
Hasan Al-Mu'thanna
Abdullah
Musa Al-Djawn
Abdullah
Musa
Muhammad
Abdullah
Ali
Suleiman
Hussein
Issa
Abd Al-Karim
Muta'in
Idris
Qatada (Sharif of Mecca)
Ali
Hassan (Sharif of Mecca)
Abu Numayy I (Sharif of Mecca)
Rumaythah (Sharif of Mecca)
Ajlan (Sharif of Mecca)
Hassan (Sharif of Mecca)
Barakat I (Sharif of Mecca)
Muhammad (Sharif of Mecca)
Barakat II (Sharif of Mecca)
Abu Numayy II (Sharif of Mecca)
Hassan (Sharif of Mecca)
Abdullah (Sharif of Mecca)
Hussein
Abdullah
Muhsin
Auon, Ra'i Al-Hadala
Abdul Mu'een
Muhammad (Sharif of Mecca)
Ali
Hussein (Sharif of Mecca King of Hejaz)
Ali (King of Hejaz)	Abdullah I (King of Jordan)	Faisal I (King of Syria King of Iraq)	Zeid (pretender to Iraq)
'Abd Al-Ilah (Regent of Iraq)	Talal (King of Jordan)	Ghazi (King of Iraq)	Ra'ad (pretender to Iraq)
Hussein (King of Jordan)	Faisal II (King of Iraq)	Zeid
Abdullah II (King of Jordan)
Hussein (Crown Prince of Jordan)

Ali ibn Hussein House of Hashim Born: 1879 Died: 13 February 1935
Regnal titles
Preceded by Hussein bin Ali	King of Hejaz; 3 October 1924 – 19 December 1925	Succeeded by Ibn Saud
Preceded by Hussein bin Ali	Sharif and Emir of Mecca; 3 October 1924 – 19 December 1925	Succeeded by Khalid ibn Lu'ayy as Emir of Mecca
Political offices
New creation	Prime Minister of Hejaz; October 1916 – 3 October 1924	Succeeded by Abd Allah Siraj
Preceded by Abdullah I of Jordan	Emir of Medina; 2 February 1919 – 3 October 1924	Succeeded by Ahmad ibn Mansur
