= Princess Nafissa =

Iraqi princess (died 1958)

- Born: 1886; Constantinople, Ottoman Empire
- Died: 14 July 1958 (aged 70–71); Baghdad, Iraq
- Spouse: Ali bin Hussein, King of Hejaz (m. 1906; died 1935)
- Issue: Abadiya; Aliya; Abd al-Ilah; Badiya; Jalila
- Father: Abd al-Ilah Pasha
- Mother: Malika Khanum

Princess Nafissa Khanum (1886 – 14 July 1958) was a Hejazi-Iraqi royalty, the mother of Crown Prince Abd al-Ilah. She was the maternal grandmother of King Faisal II of Iraq. She died during the massacre of the royal family during the 14 July Revolution.

== Life ==
She was the daughter of Abd al-Ilah Pasha ibn Muhammad, Grand Sharif and Emir of Mecca. Her title by birth was Sharifa of Mecca. She married Ali bin Hussein, King of Hejaz, in 1906 in Yeniköy, Bosporus. Her husband was the King of Hejaz in 1924–1925. The family moved to Iraq after the deposition of her husband in 1925.

Her daughter married the king Ghazi of Iraq and became queen of Iraq in 1933. Nafissa became a widow in 1935. In 1939, her grandson Faisal II became king of Iraq.

On 14 July 1958, the Royal Al-Rehab Palace in Baghdad, was attacked by the rebels during the 14 July Revolution. When the defenders of the palace realized they were vastly overnumbered, and that it would be impossible to defend the royal family, they agreed to hand them over to the rebels, who stated that they would transport them to custody in the Ministry of Defense. The royal family, consisting of the king, the crown prince, Princess Hiyam, Princess Nafissa, Princess Abadiya (the king's aunt), as well as some members of the royal staff, left the palace via the kitchen. When passing the kitchen garden through a row of rebel soldiers, the soldiers opened fire. The king was hit in the head and neck, while the crown prince, Nafissa and Abadiya were all hit in the back, and Princess Hiyam in the leg or hip. The rebels had agreed that the crown prince and the prime minister should be killed, but there had been different opinions as what to do with the king, and no decisions at all in regard to the female members of the family.

After the massacre, the bodies were taken to cars to be transported to the Ministry of Defence. The king, as well as the princesses Abadiya and Hiyam, were reportedly still alive during the transport, but the king died along the way. During the transport, the cars stopped, and the bodies of the king and the crown prince were taken out; the former being hanged, the latter being defiled and dragged through the streets. Hiyam was the only member of the family to survive.

== Issue ==
She had one son and four daughters:

- Abadiya bint Ali – born 1907 – died 14 July 1958.
- Princess Aliya – born 1911 – died 21 December 1950, married her first cousin, Ghazi I King of Iraq, becoming Queen Aliya of Iraq.
- Crown Prince Abd al-Ilah – born 14 November 1913 – died 14 July 1958, married three times first to Melek el-Din Fauzi in 1936 divorced in 1940, then to Faiza al-Tarabulsi in 1948 divorced 1950 and finally to Hiyam 'Abdu'l-Ilah in 1958.
- Princess Badiya – born June 1920 - died London 9 May 2020, married Sharif Al-Hussein bin Ali. They had a son, Sharif Ali bin Al-Hussein and 2 daughters.
- Princess Jalila – born 1923 – died 28 December 1955, married Sharif Dr. Ahmad Hazim Bey.
