= Abadiya bint Ali =

Iraqi princess (1907–1958)

Khadija Abdiya bint Ali
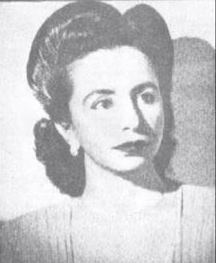
- Born: 1907; Stinia Palace, Yeniköy, Bosporus, Ottoman Empire
- Died: 14 July 1958 (aged 50–51); Baghdad, Iraq
- House: House of Hashem
- Father: Ali bin Hussein
- Mother: Nafissa Khanum

Khadija Abdiya bint Ali (1907 – 14 July 1958) was a Hejazi-Iraqi princess. She was the daughter of Ali, King of Hejaz, and Princess Nafissa, sister of Crown Prince 'Abd al-Ilah, and the aunt of King Faisal II of Iraq. She was murdered in the massacre of the royal family during the 14 July Revolution.

== Life ==
She spent her childhood in Mecca. Her father was deposed in 1924, and she followed her family in exile to Iraq, where her uncle had been made king in 1921.

Her brother 'Abd al-Ilah, served as regent of Iraq for their nephew King Faisal II when he became king as a minor in 1939. When her sister, Queen Aliya bint Ali died in 1950, she was asked to act as a mother figure for the king. She never married, was described as somewhat Spartan, and devoted herself to supervising the palace staff.

On 14 July 1958, the Royal Al-Rehab Palace in Baghdad was attacked by the rebels during the 14 July Revolution. When the defenders of the palace realized they were vastly overnumbered, and that it would be impossible to defend the royal family, they agreed to hand them over to the rebels, who stated that they would transport them to custody in the Ministry of Defense. The royal family, consisting of the king, the crown prince, Princess Hiyam, Princess Nafissa (mother of the crown prince), and Princess Abadiya (the king's aunt), as well as some members of the royal staff, left the palace via the kitchen. When passing the kitchen garden through a row of rebel soldiers, the soldiers opened fire. The king was hit in the head and neck, while the crown prince, Nafissa and Abadiya were all hit in the back, and Hiyam in the leg or hip. Abadiya was shot alongside her six year old ward, Ghaziya. The rebels had agreed that the crown prince and the prime minister should be killed, but there had been different opinions as to what to do with the king, and no decisions at all in regard to the female members of the family.

After the massacre, the bodies were taken to cars to be transported to the Ministry of Defense. The king, Abadiya, and Hiyam were reportedly still alive, but the king died during the trip. The cars stopped, and the bodies of the king and the crown prince were taken out, the former being hanged, the latter being defiled and dragged through the streets.
