= Faisal of Iraq =

Faisal of Iraq may refer to:

- Faisal I of Iraq, leader during the Arab Revolt
- Faisal II of Iraq
