= Crown Prince Abdullah =

Crown Prince Abdullah may refer to:

- Abdullah of Saudi Arabia, Crown Prince of Saudi Arabia 1982–2005, and later King
- Abd al-Ilah, Crown Prince of Iraq 1943–1953
- Abdullah II of Jordan, Crown Prince of Jordan 1962–1965 and again 1999, and later King
