= Princess Hiyam =

Iraqi Crown Princess (1933–2001)

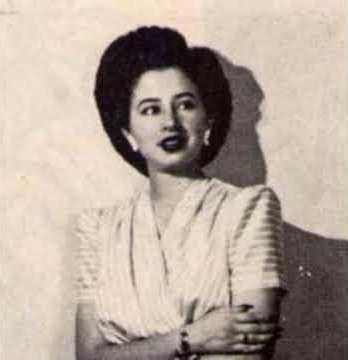
- Princess Hiyam
- Reign: 1956 – 14 July 1958
- Born: 1933; Iraq
- Died: 2001 (aged 65–66); Amman, Jordan
- Spouse: Crown Prince 'Abd al-Ilah of Iraq (m. 1956; died 1958)
- House: House of Hashim (by marriage)
- Father: Sheikh Mohammed al-Habib
- Religion: Islam

Princess Hiyam (1933– January 2001) was the Iraqi Crown Princess through marriage to Crown Prince 'Abd al-Ilah. She was the aunt by marriage to King Faisal II of Iraq. She survived the massacre of the royal family during the 14 July Revolution.

She was the daughter of Sheikh al-Omara Mohammed al-Habib and married the crown prince in 1956.

On 14 July 1958, the Royal Al-Rehab Palace in Baghdad, was attacked by the rebels during the 14 July Revolution. When the defenders of the palace realized they were vastly overnumbered, and that it would be impossible to defend the royal family, they agreed to hand them over to the rebels, who stated that they would transport them to custody in the Ministry of Defense. The royal family, consisting of the king, the crown prince, Princess Hiyam, Princess Nafissa (mother of the crown prince), Princess Abadiya (the king's aunt), as well as some members of the royal staff, left the palace via the kitchen. When passing the kitchen garden through a row of rebel soldiers, the soldiers opened fire. The king was hit in the head and neck, while the crown prince, Nafissa, and Abadiya were all hit in the back, and Princess Hiyam in the leg or hip. The rebels had agreed that the crown prince and the prime minister should be killed, but there had been different opinions as what to do with the king, and no decisions at all in regard to the female members of the family.

After the massacre, the bodies were taken to cars to be transported to the Ministry of Defence. The king, as well as the princesses Abadiya and Hiyam, were reportedly still alive during the transport, but the king died along the way. During the transport, the cars stopped, and the bodies of the king and the crown prince were taken out; the former being hanged, the latter being defiled and dragged through the streets. Hiyam was the only member of the family to survive, but exactly as to how and why this happened remains unclear. In the confusion after the initial shooting she was apparently protected by some soldiers from her family tribe.

Princess Hiyam later married her cousin and had two children. Her husband was her cousin from both sides and a member of the Al Rabiaa tribe which is a prominent tribe from the south of Iraq. She came to live in Jordan in the 1980s. She died in Amman, Jordan, in January 2001.
