= Ghazi of Iraq =

King of Iraq from 1933 to 1939

Ghazi I
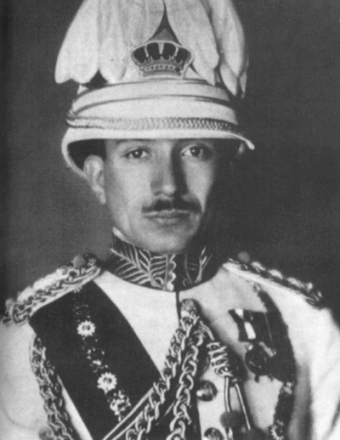
- Formal portrait, c. 1933–1939

King of Iraq
- Reign: 8 September 1933 – 4 April 1939
- Predecessor: Faisal I
- Successor: Faisal II
- Born: 21 March 1912; Mecca, Hejaz, Ottoman Empire (present-day Saudi Arabia)
- Died: 4 April 1939 (aged 27); Baghdad, Kingdom of Iraq
- Burial: Iraqi Royal Cemetery, Baghdad, Iraq
- Spouse: Princess Aliya bint Ali (m. 1934)
- Issue: Faisal II
Names
- Ghazi ibn Faisal
- House: Hashemite
- Dynasty: Hashemites of Iraq
- Father: Faisal I
- Mother: Huzaima bint Nasser
- Religion: Sunni Islam

Ghazi ibn Faisal (Arabic: غَازِيّ إبْنِ فَيْصَل, romanized: Gâzî ibn-i Faysal) (21 March 1912 – 4 April 1939) was King of Iraq from 1933 to 1939 having been briefly Crown Prince of the Kingdom of Syria in 1920. He was born in Mecca, and was the only son of Faisal I. He died in a car accident in Baghdad in 1939, where he was succeeded by his son, Faisal II.

== Early life ==
Ghazi was the only son of the then Emir Faisal (later to become King Faisal I of Iraq) and Huzaima bint Nasser. He was born when his father was leading a campaign in 'Asir against Muhammad ibn Ali al-Idrisi of 'Asir; so he was named Ghazi (meaning warrior due to this campaign, In his childhood, Ghazi was left with his grandfather, Hussein bin Ali, the Hashemite Grand Sharif of Mecca and head of the royal house of Hashim, who called Ghazi "Awn" after his great-grandfather Awn bin Muhsin, while his father was occupied with travel and in military campaigns against the Ottomans. The Hashemites had ruled the Hijaz within the Ottoman Empire before rebelling with British assistance in the later stages of World War I. He attended Harrow School.

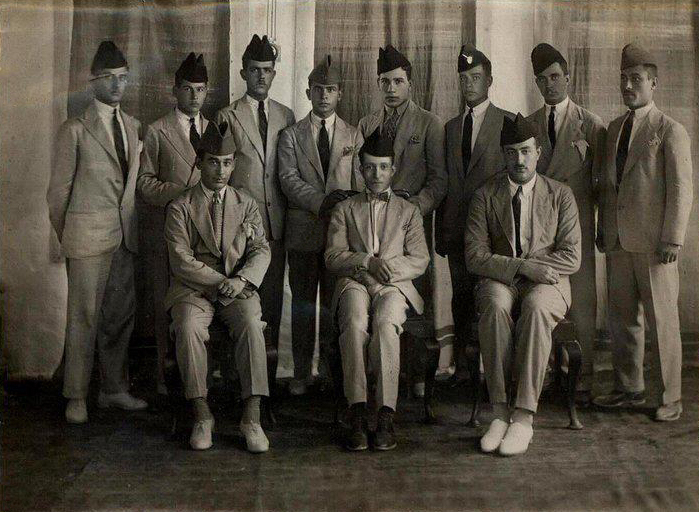
The then Crown Prince Ghazi of Iraq in 1927 (centre of the front row)

Unlike his worldly father, Ghazi grew up a shy and inexperienced young man. Following the defeat of his grandfather's army by Saudi forces in 1924, he was forced to leave the Hijaz with the rest of the Hashemites. They travelled to Transjordan where Ghazi's uncle Abdullah was Emir. In the same year, Ghazi joined his father in Baghdad and was appointed as crown prince and heir to the Kingdom of Iraq. His father had been crowned following a national referendum in 1921.

=== Flying Carpet ===
As a 16-year-old schoolboy, he met the traveler-adventurer Richard Halliburton and his pilot Moye Stephens during their round-the-world flight (shortly after Charles Lindbergh's celebrated transatlantic flight). Ghazi was taken for his first flight by Halliburton and Stephens in their biplane, the Flying Carpet. They flew down to see the ruins of Ancient Babylon and other historical sites and flew low over the prince's own school so that his schoolmates could see him in the biplane. An account of the young Crown Prince Ghazi's experience flying over his country can be found in Richard Halliburton's The Flying Carpet.

=== Events in Simele ===
Ghazi came to Simele to award the military and tribal leaders who, on 11 August 1933, participated in the Simele massacre of Assyrians and the looting of their homes.

== Reign ==
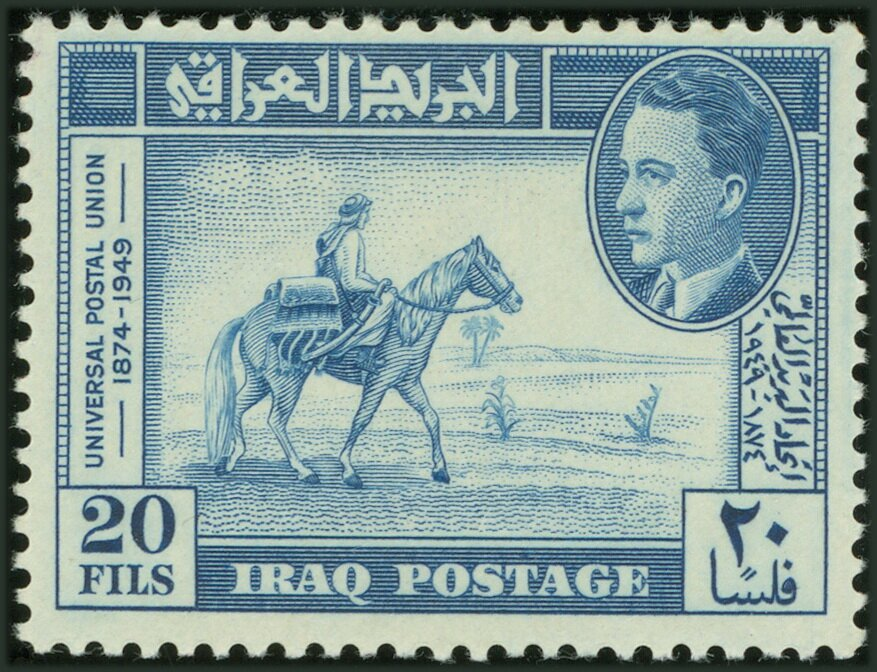
King Ghazi postage from 1949

On 8 September 1933, King Faisal I died, and Ghazi was crowned as King Ghazi I. On the same day, Ghazi was appointed an Admiral of the Fleet in the Royal Iraqi Navy, a Field Marshal in the Royal Iraqi Army, and a Marshal of the Royal Iraqi Air Force. A staunch pan-Arab nationalist, opposed to British interests in his country, Ghazi's reign was characterised by tensions between civilians and the army, which sought control of the government. He supported General Bakr Sidqi in his coup, which replaced the civilian government with a military one. This was the first coup d'état to take place in the modern Arab world. He was rumoured to harbour sympathies for Nazi Germany and also put forth a claim for Kuwait to be annexed to Iraq. For this purpose, he had his own radio station in al-Zuhoor royal palace in which he promoted that claim and other radical views.

== Death ==
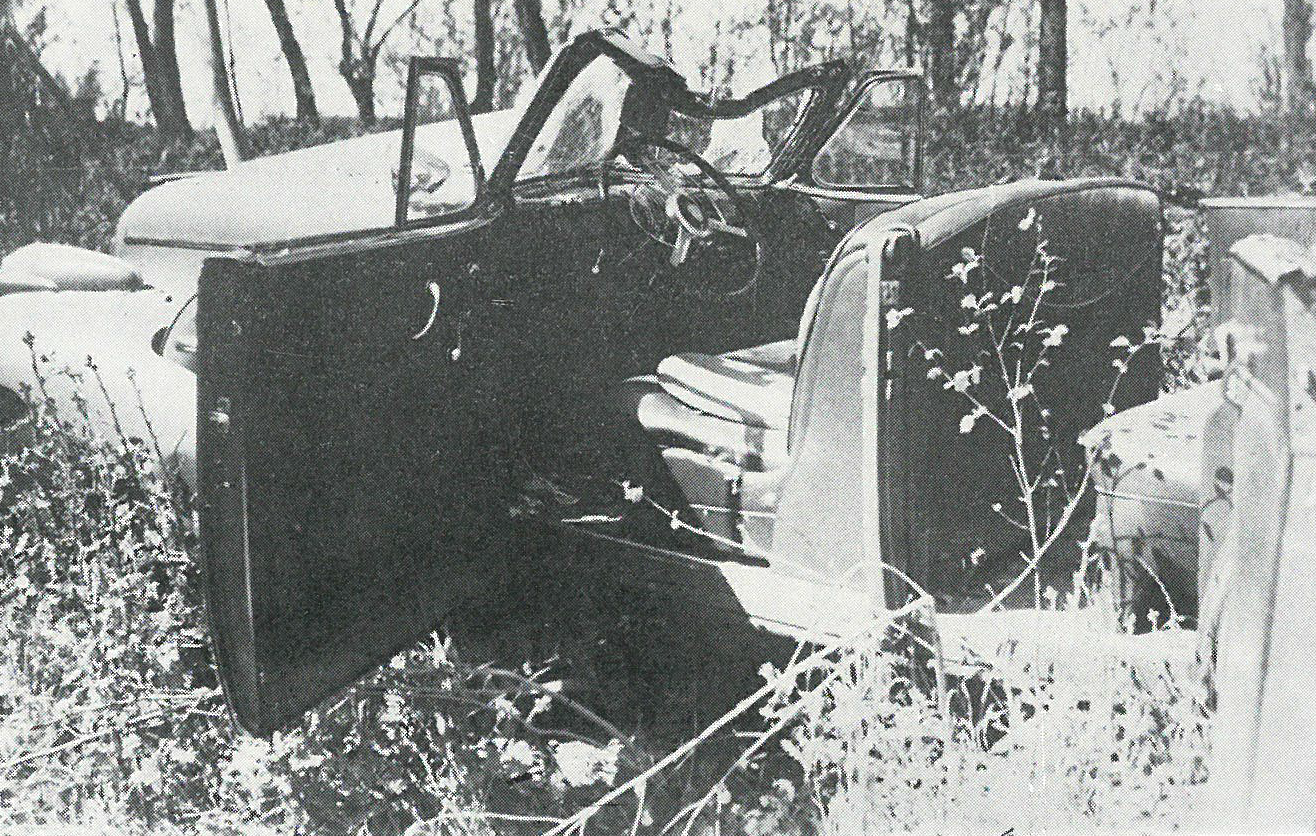
Ghazi's vehicle after accident

King Ghazi died in April 1939 in an accident at the age of 27, involving a sports car that he was driving. According to the scholars Ma'ruf al-Rusafi and Safa Khulusi, a common view by many Iraqis at the time was that he was killed on the orders of Nuri al-Said, because of his plans for the unification of Iraq with Kuwait.

Faisal, Ghazi's only son, succeeded him as King Faisal II. Because Faisal was underage, Prince Abdul Ilah served as regent until 1953.

== Marriage and children ==
On 25 January 1934, King Ghazi married his first cousin, Princess Aliya bint Ali, daughter of his uncle King Ali of Hejaz, in Baghdad, Iraq. They had only one son, Faisal II, born 2 May 1935.

Faisal had a circumcision party on Thursday, 7 November 1935, in al Zuhoor Palace and Emir Abdullah I of Transjordan and his son, Prince Nayef bin Abdullah, attended the party as well as the staff of the Hashemite Family. King Ghazi then ordered the distribution of ِalms to the poor and needy, and over 50 children in an Islamic orphanage were also circumcised on the account of King Ghazi who then distributed desserts among them. King Ghazi attended a banquet in the evening of that day which was attended by the Emir Abdullah of Transjordan and his son Nayef, and Prince 'Abd al-Ilah, and he invited the Prime Minister, former prime ministers, the leaders of the Senate and the Chamber of Deputies, and senior statesmen.

Ghazi was suspected of having an extra-marital affair with a young Iraqi servant. British sources wrote in 1938 that King Ghazi's bad reputation was tarnished "further" when a "Negro youth", who was employed at the palace, died by "accidentally" discharging his revolver when he did not remove it before his afternoon siesta. An official police expert ruled that the Palace's explanation was consistent with the police examination.

The British suspected there was more to the story, in particular, that one of Queen Aliya's "adherents" might have killed the boy, as the boy was suspected to be "the King's boon companion in debauchery" and the Queen therefore had a "deep aversion" to the boy. The King was in a panic after this incident, fearing imminent assassination.

== Ancestry ==
Hashemites

Hashim (eponymous ancestor)
Abd al-Muttalib
Abu Talib	Abdallah
Muhammad (Islamic prophet)
Ali (fourth caliph)	Fatimah
Hasan (fifth caliph)
Hasan Al-Mu'thanna
Abdullah
Musa Al-Djawn
Abdullah
Musa
Muhammad
Abdullah
Ali
Suleiman
Hussein
Issa
Abd Al-Karim
Muta'in
Idris
Qatada (Sharif of Mecca)
Ali
Hassan (Sharif of Mecca)
Abu Numayy I (Sharif of Mecca)
Rumaythah (Sharif of Mecca)
Ajlan (Sharif of Mecca)
Hassan (Sharif of Mecca)
Barakat I (Sharif of Mecca)
Muhammad (Sharif of Mecca)
Barakat II (Sharif of Mecca)
Abu Numayy II (Sharif of Mecca)
Hassan (Sharif of Mecca)
Abdullah (Sharif of Mecca)
Hussein
Abdullah
Muhsin
Auon, Ra'i Al-Hadala
Abdul Mu'een
Muhammad (Sharif of Mecca)
Ali
Hussein (Sharif of Mecca King of Hejaz)
Ali (King of Hejaz)	Abdullah I (King of Jordan)	Faisal I (King of Syria King of Iraq)	Zeid (pretender to Iraq)
'Abd Al-Ilah (Regent of Iraq)	Talal (King of Jordan)	Ghazi (King of Iraq)	Ra'ad (pretender to Iraq)
Hussein (King of Jordan)	Faisal II (King of Iraq)	Zeid
Abdullah II (King of Jordan)
Hussein (Crown Prince of Jordan)

== Gallery ==
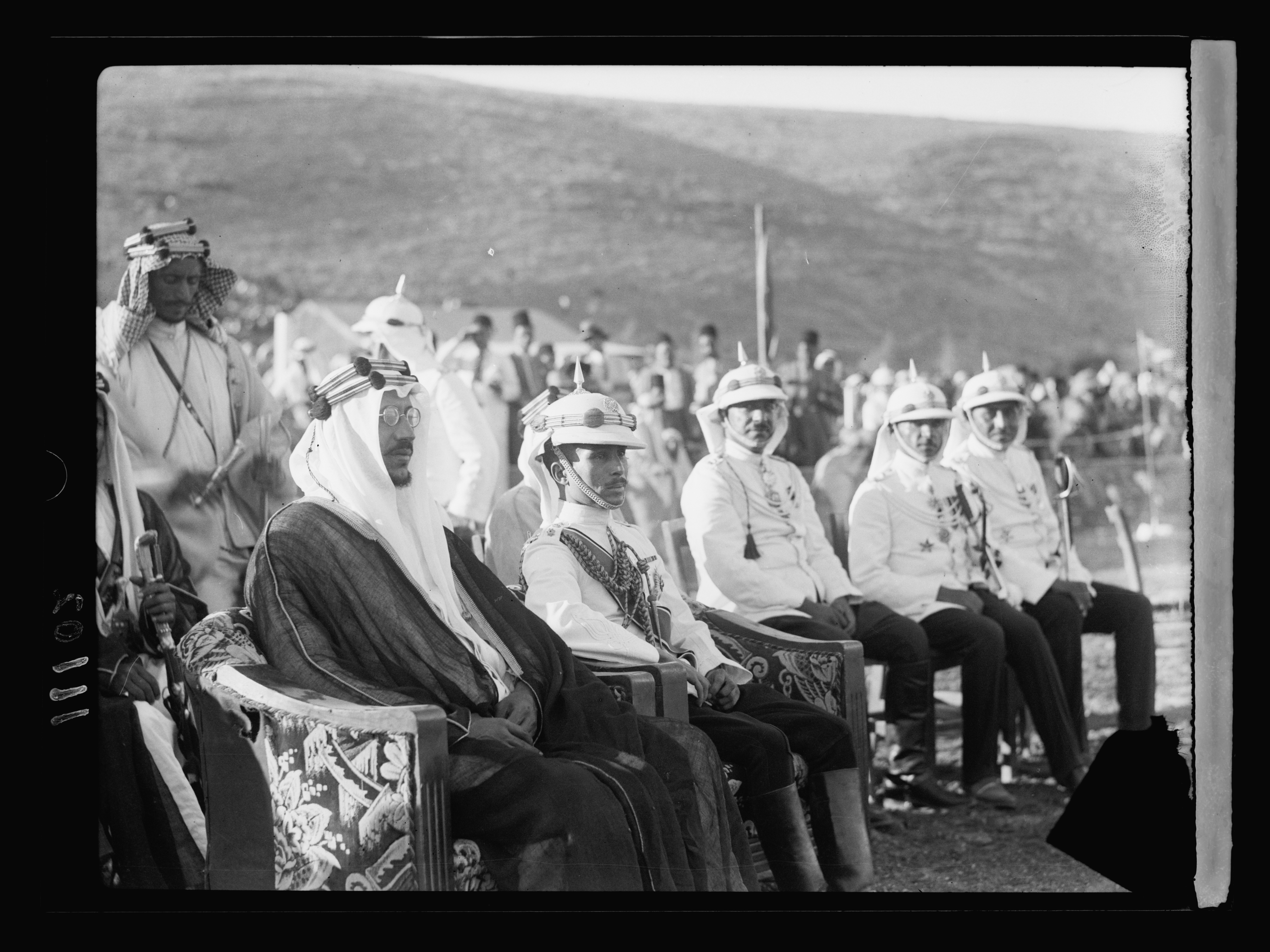
King Ghazi with King Saud of Saudi Arabia

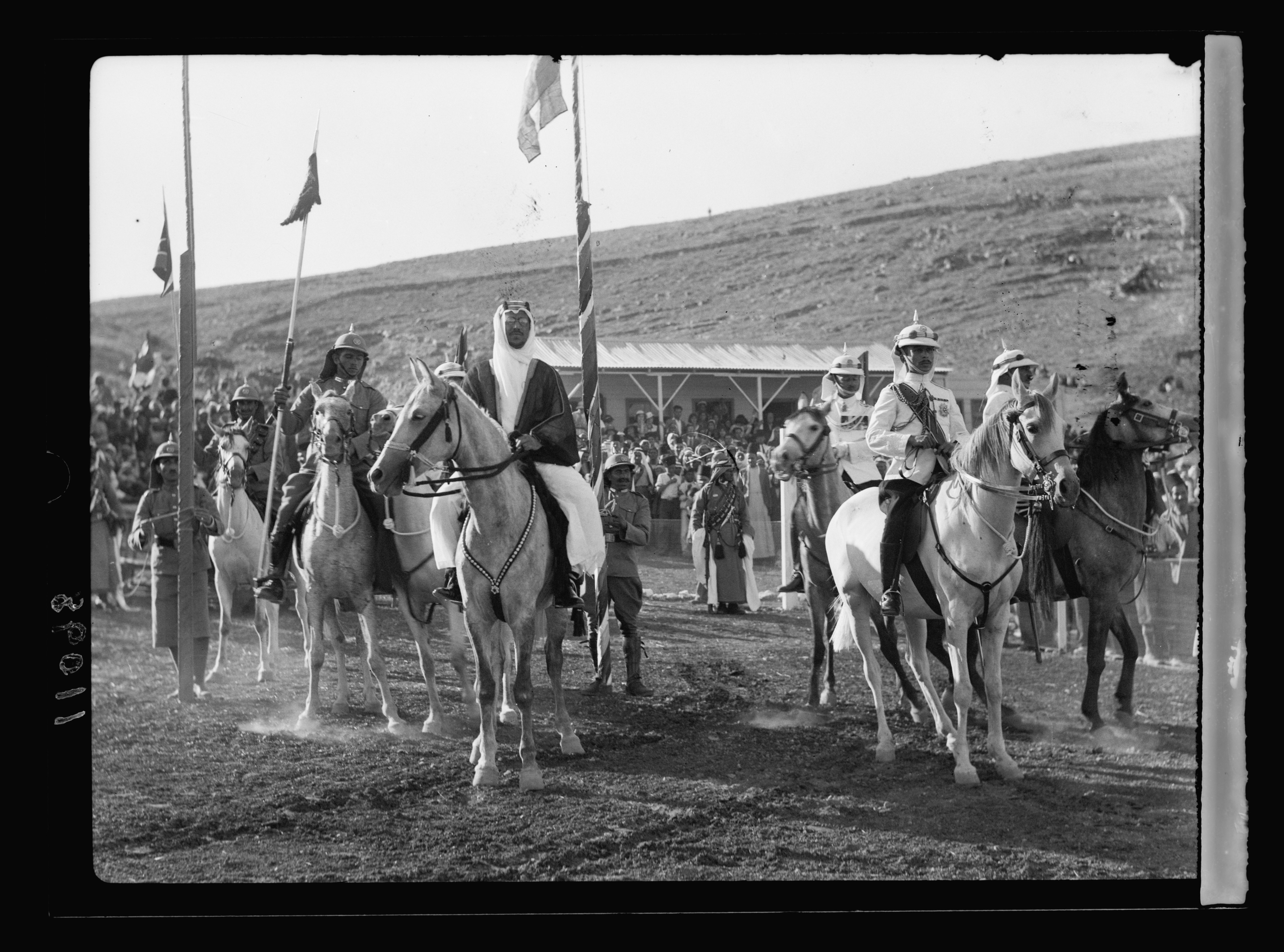
King Ghazi and Emir Saud on horses

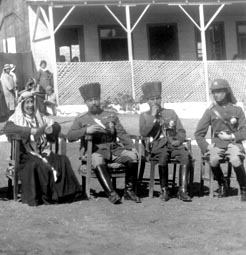
King Ghazi of Iraq with his father King Faisal I and uncle King Abdullah I of Transjordan

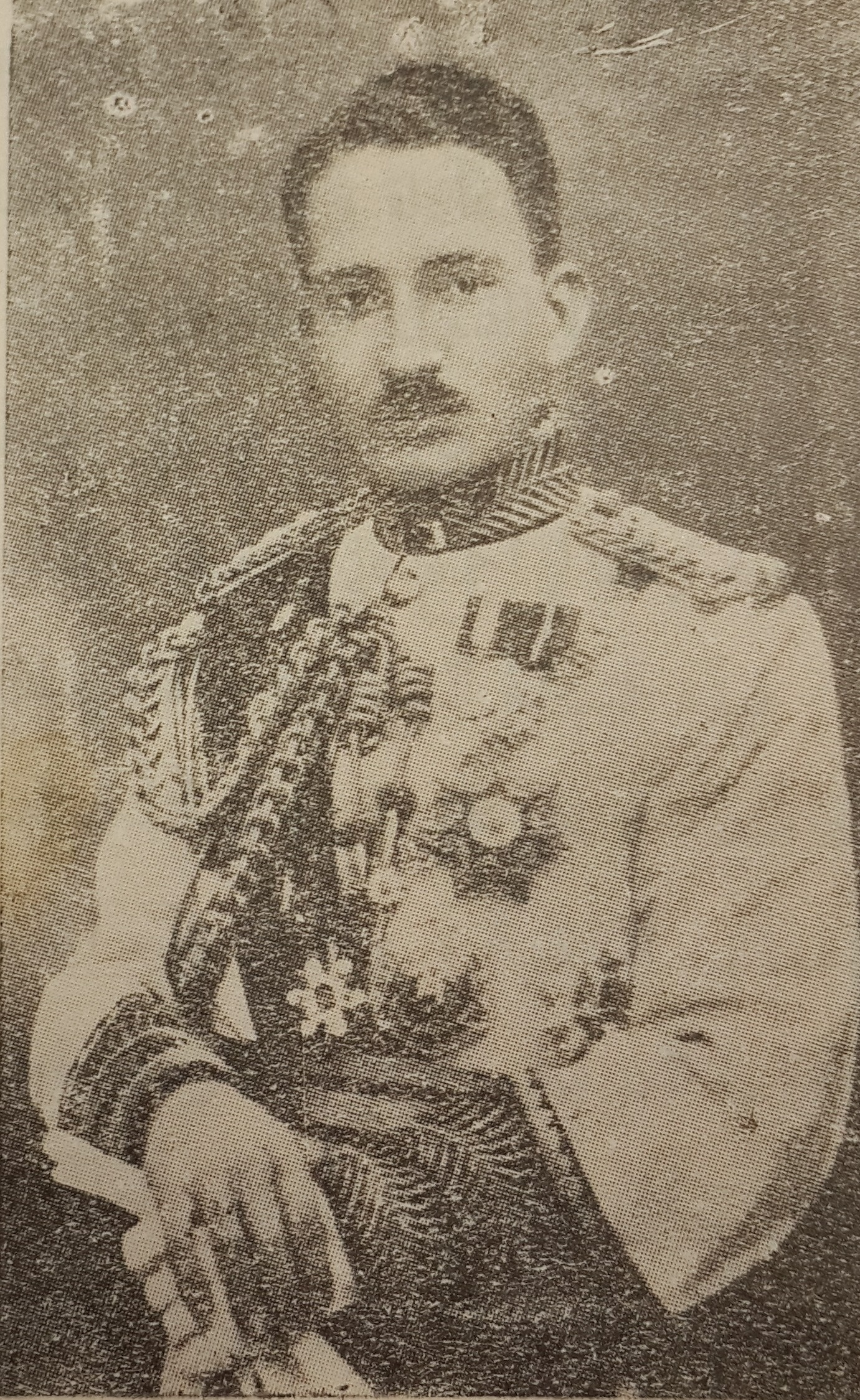
Ghazi of Iraq in ceremonial uniform

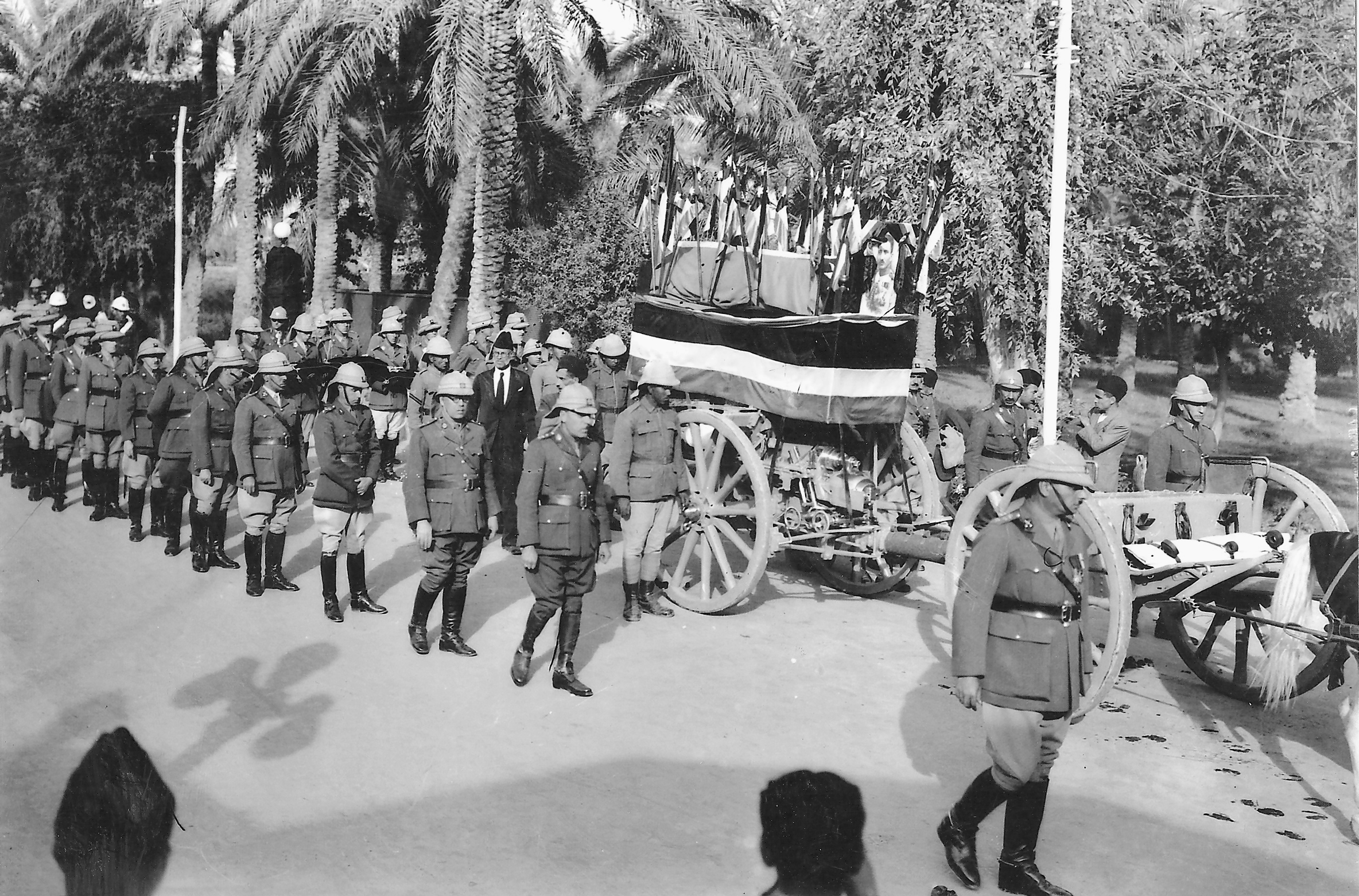
The State funeral of King Ghazi of Iraq in 1939

== See also ==
- British Mandate of Mesopotamia
- List of unsolved deaths
- Saib Shawkat

Ghazi of Iraq House of Hāshim Born: 21 March 1912 Died: 4 April 1939
Regnal titles
Preceded by King Faisal I	King of Iraq; 8 September 1933 – 4 April 1939	Succeeded by King Faisal II
Titles in pretence
Preceded by King Faisal I	— TITULAR — King of Syria; 8 September 1933 – 4 April 1939; Reason for succession failure: Kingdom abolished in 1920	Succeeded by King Faisal II
