= 1956 riots in Iraq =

In 1956, riots took place in Iraq in support of Gamal Abdel Nasser during the Suez Crisis, and in opposition to political prisoners held by the regime of King Faisal II of Iraq. Communists and nationalists took to the streets in Najaf, and soon after the protests spread to Mosul and Sulaymaniyah. In November, two demonstrators were killed and another wounded. In December, the riots spread to Hayy. The riots ended after they were dispersed by the police.
