= Faisal II =

King of Iraq from 1939 to 1958

- Official portrait, 1953

King of Iraq
- Reign: 4 April 1939 – 14 July 1958
- Regency ended: 2 May 1953
- Predecessor: Ghazi
- Successor: Monarchy abolished; (Muhammad Najib ar-Ruba'i, President of Iraq); (Zeid bin Hussein as head of Iraqi and Syrian royal family)
- Prime Minister: See list: Nuri al-Said (7 times); Rashid Ali al-Gaylani (twice); Taha al-Hashimi; Jamil al-Midfai (twice); Hamdi al-Pachachi; Tawfiq al-Suwaidi (twice); Arshad al-Umari (Twice); Salih Jabr; Muhammad as-Sadr; Muzahim al-Pachachi; Ali Jawdat al-Aiyubi (twice); Mustafa Mahmud al-Umari; Nureddin Mahmud; Muhammad Fadhel al-Jamali; Abdul-Wahab Mirjan; Ahmad Mukhtar Baban
- Regent (1939–1953): Prince Abdullah
- Born: 2 May 1935; Baghdad, Kingdom of Iraq
- Died: 14 July 1958 (aged 23); Baghdad, Arab Federation
- Burial: Iraqi Royal Cemetery, Baghdad
Names
- Faisal bin Ghazi bin Faisal bin Hussein bin Ali
- House: Hashemite
- Father: Ghazi
- Mother: Aliya of Hejaz
- Religion: Sunni Islam

Faisal II (Arabic: الملك فيصل الثاني, romanized: al-Malik Fayṣal al-thānī; 2 May 1935 – 14 July 1958) was the last King of Iraq. He reigned from 4 April 1939 until July 1958, when he was killed during the 14 July Revolution. This regicide marked the end of the thirty-seven-year-old Hashemite monarchy in Iraq, which then became a republic.

The only son of King Ghazi and Queen Aliya of Iraq, Faisal acceded to the throne at the age of three after his father was killed in a car crash. A regency was set up under his uncle Prince 'Abd al-Ilah. In 1941, a pro-Axis coup d'état overthrew the regent. The British responded by initiating an invasion of Iraq a month later and restored 'Abd al-Ilah to power. During the Second World War, Faisal was evacuated along with his mother to the United Kingdom. There, he attended Harrow School alongside his cousin Hussein, the future King of Jordan. The regency ended in May 1953 when Faisal came of age.

The overthrow of the Egyptian monarchy in 1952 and the formation of the United Arab Republic in February 1958 only provided impetuses to ideas of a revolution. The Hashemite Arab Federation was formed between Iraq and Jordan in February 1958 with Faisal as its head, which did not quell widespread opposition. In July 1958, a group of Royal Iraqi Army officers led by Abdul-Karim Qasim mounted a coup d'état and overthrew the monarchy. Faisal was executed along with numerous members of his family in the process at the Al-Rehab Palace massacre on 14 July 1958.

== Family and early life ==
=== Birth and early years ===
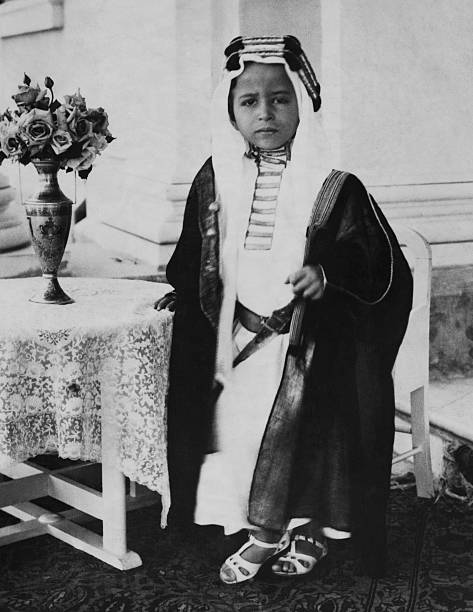
King Faisal II at the age of 5

Faisal was the only son of King Ghazi of Iraq and his wife, Queen Aliya, second daughter of 'Ali bin Hussein, King of the Hejaz and Grand Sharif of Mecca. Faisal's father was killed in a mysterious car crash when he was three years old; his father’s first cousin, Prince 'Abd al-Ilah, served as regent until Faisal came of age in 1953. He suffered from asthma.

=== 1941 coup ===
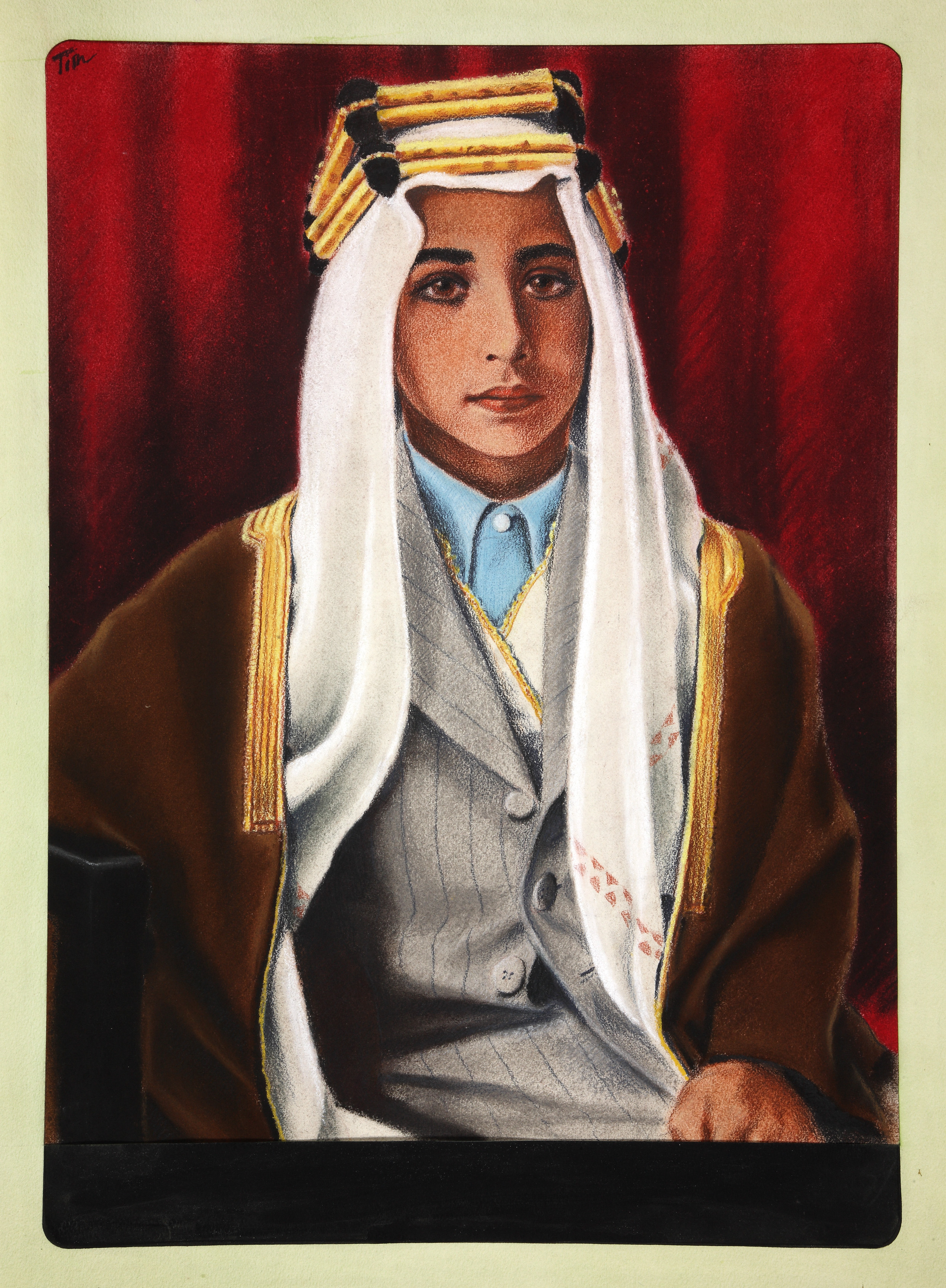
King Faisal II of Iraq c. 1944

Faisal's childhood coincided with the Second World War, in which the Hashemite Kingdom of Iraq was formally allied with the British Empire and the Allies. In April 1941, his first cousin once removed 'Abd al-Ilah was briefly deposed as Regent by a military coup d'état which aimed to align Iraq with the Axis powers. The 1941 coup in Iraq soon led to the Anglo-Iraqi War. German aid proved insufficient, and the Regent 'Abd al-Ilah was restored to power by a combined Allied force composed of the Jordanian Arab Legion, the Royal Air Force, and other British units. Iraq resumed its British ties, and at the end of the war joined the United Nations.

During his early years, Faisal was tutored at the Royal Al-Rehab Palace with several other Iraqi boys. During the Second World War, he lived for a time with his mother at Grove Lodge at Winkfield Row in Berkshire in England. Faisal attended Sandroyd School then Harrow School with his paternal second cousin Prince Hussein, later to become King Hussein of Jordan. The two boys were close friends, and reportedly planned early on to merge their two realms, to counter what they considered to be the "threat" of Communism and left-leaning variants of pan-Arab nationalism. Recently, 143 drawings by Faisal using either pencil or crayon were put on display at Iraq's National Archives depicting backdrops of the war he lived through. These include drawings of aircraft, bombs, killer robots, and extreme fighting on both land and sea and drawings also depicting peaceful subjects, including landscapes, birds, and buildings, as well as maps of Europe and North Africa.

=== 1952 United States tour ===
In 1952, at age 17, Faisal began plans to visit the United States and its many development projects such as agriculture, power projects, canal systems, and land reclamation schemes. Of particular interest to the King were the irrigation projects as Faisal would later tell the New York press that those were “very much needed in our country."

On 12 August, 1952, Faisal began the five-week tour and, along with Regent 'Abd al-Ilah, arrived at 11 AM, on the Hudson River on the RMS Queen Mary and were given a tour around the United Nations Headquarters in Manhattan. The next day, Faisal went on a tour of the Empire State Building and after arriving at City Hall for a reception with Mayor Vincent R. Impellitteri, he famously went to attend a game held at Ebbets Field. The visit was covered by many news outlets nationwide that many forgot Faisal's original motives for the visit. He would also famously be on the side of the Brooklyn Dodgers but reportedly could not tell the difference between them and the other team, the New York Giants, until one of his aides told him that the team's names are written on the players' clothes.

In the following days, he would tour Radio City Music Hall and the Esso Oil Company. On 16 of August, both would depart from LaGuardia Airport for Washington, D.C., where he met President Harry Truman. Over the following weeks, he would meet other famous individuals, such as Dean Acheson, the actor James Mason, and Jackie Robinson, among others.

== Adulthood ==
Less than a year after his visit to the United States, Faisal attained his majority on 2 May 1953, commencing his active rule with little experience and during a changing Iraqi political and social climate exacerbated by the rapid development of pan-Arab nationalism. On the same day his cousin, Hussein, was enthroned in Jordan. Reportedly, Faisal's reign was marked by tolerance and co-existence with other faiths and branches of Islam and projects such as an irrigation project, inspired by the US project. Public buildings were built under his reign such as al-Shawy Mosque which he visited along with scholars and notables of Baghdad on TV. Faisal initially relied for political advice upon his father’s cousin Prince 'Abd al-Ilah and General Nuri al-Sa'id, a veteran politician and nationalist who had already served several terms as Prime Minister. However, Faisal's reign simultaneously grew increasingly unstable against a backdrop of economic inequality coupled with the rise of Communism, anti-imperialist sentiment, and mounting Pan-Arab nationalism.

Hastening Faisal's demise was the decision taken by his regent (later confirmed by him) to allow the United Kingdom to retain a continued role in Iraqi affairs, through the Anglo-Iraqi Treaty of 1948, and later the Baghdad Pact, signed in 1955. Increasing massive protests greeted news of each of these alliances, contributing to the deaths of hundreds of demonstrators and an increasing deterioration of loyalty to the Iraqi Crown.

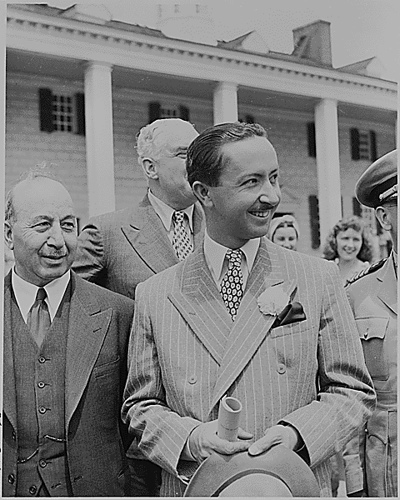
Prince Abdullah (holding hat) at Mount Vernon, U.S. He was the regent of his nephew Faisal during his infancy. They were both killed during the 1958 coup.

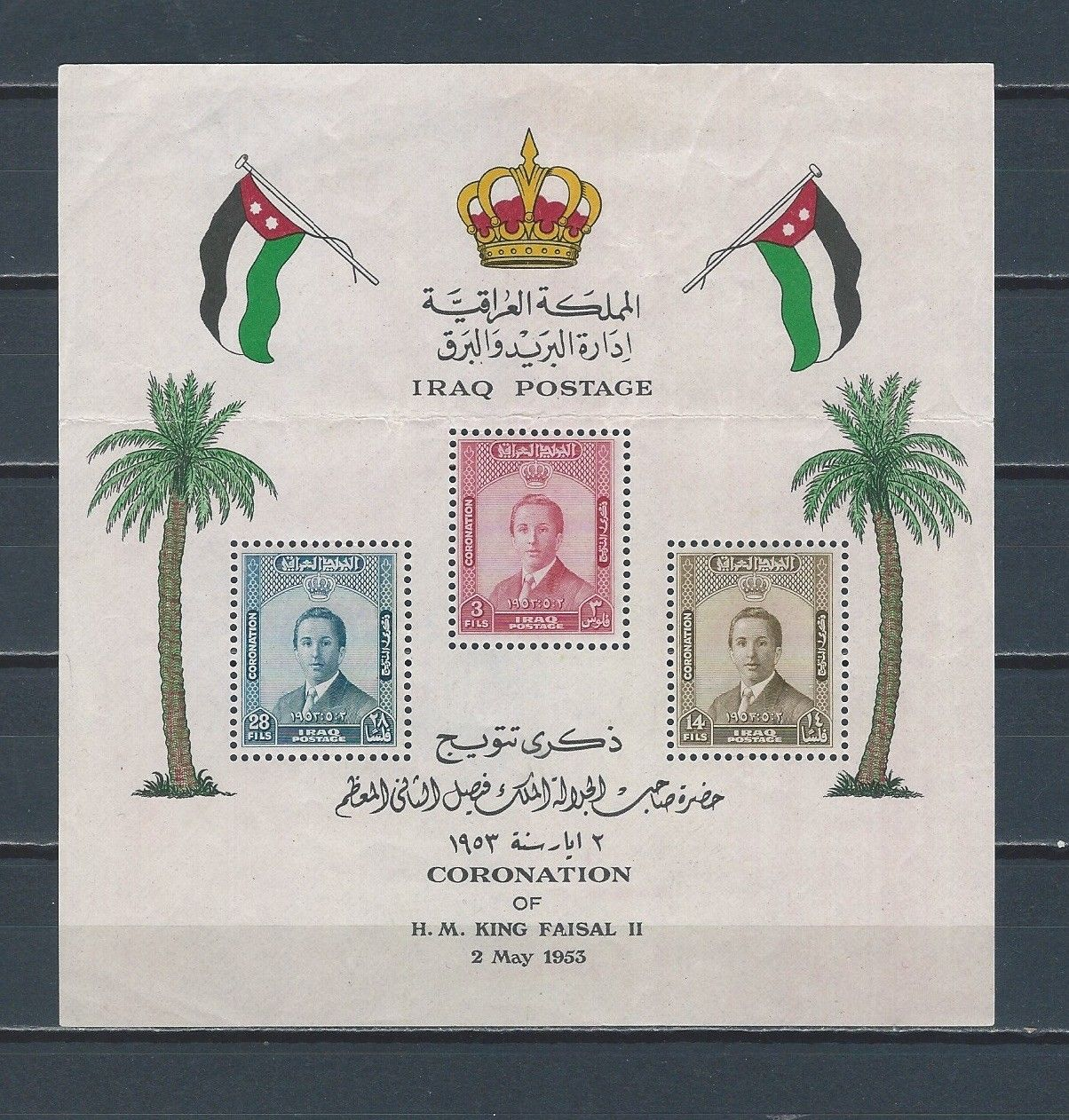
Postage stamp of his 1953 coronation

As oil revenues increased during the 1950s, the king and his advisors chose to invest their wealth in development projects, which some claimed increasingly alienated the rapidly growing middle class and the peasantry. The Iraqi Communist Party increased its influence. Though the regime seemed secure, there was dissatisfaction with Iraq's condition. An ever-widening gap between the wealth of the political elites, landowners, and other supporters of the regime on the one hand, and the poverty of workers and peasants on the other, intensified opposition to Faisal's government. Since the upper classes controlled the parliament, reformists increasingly saw revolution as their sole hope for improvement. The Egyptian Revolution of 1952, led by Gamal Abdel Nasser, provided an impetus for a similar undertaking in Iraq.

=== Plans for Greater Baghdad ===
During his reign, Faisal initiated large-scale plans for the modernization of Greater Baghdad. The goal of this ambitious project was to improve and develop infrastructure and housing, provide essential public buildings, reform the building industries, and train future Iraqi architects to not rely on Western help. The increase in the economy that subsequently enabled the plans for Greater Baghdad to be developed was due to negotiations with the British-controlled Iraq Petroleum Company in 1952 that achieved an equitable share of oil rights and a substantial increase in Iraq's revenue. Faisal also created the semiautonomous Development Board which consisted of six members including a foreign advisor with the goal of improving living conditions and construction. After various negotiations, the board received a percentage of the annual oil revenue and in 1955 it established a six-year plan with a larger budget, a quarter of which was assigned to public buildings. In an effort to secure the authority of King Faisal II and the Royal Family and to thwart possible tensions, funds needed to be invested in urban areas where it was feared the conflict would potentially appear.

Many architects from around the world were invited, among them Alvar Aalto, Walter Gropius (who designed the faculty tower and gateway monument to Baghdad University), and Le Corbusier. Commissions for public buildings followed and the first ones went to the German architect Werner March for the Iraq Museum and the English firm J. Brian Cooper to build the National Parliament and the Royal Palace. An architect competition was held for the National Bank which Swiss architect William Dunkel won. Some of the buildings designed during this time were built decades later, under Saddam Hussein, such as the Baghdad Gymnasium which was designed by Le Corbusier. Frank Lloyd Wright was also invited by Faisal to design much of Newer Baghdad, but Wright seemed to not regard Iraq as an underdeveloped nation and wanted to preserve its character. Inspired by Harun al-Rashid and the Arabian Nights, Wright's plans seemed to echo old Abbasid architecture in Baghdad such as circular layout and are imbued in greenery to allude to the Garden of Eden.

Despite the contribution to the development of the city, some have criticized Faisal's plans for Greater Baghdad and the many styles that he introduced to be a "Westernization" of Iraq. The plans also acquired international attention as a letter from the British Board of Trade that was sent to a number of British architects. Some of the criticism of the plans were used as justification during the 14 July Revolution.

=== The Arab Federation ===
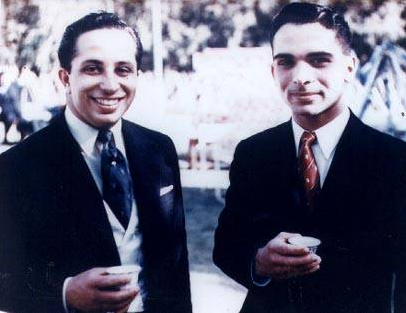
Faisal (left) with his cousin King Hussein of Jordan, in February 1958.

On 1 February 1958, neighboring Syria joined with Nasser's Egypt to form the United Arab Republic which Iraq did not recognize. This prompted the Hashemite kingdoms of Iraq and Jordan to strengthen their ties by establishing a similar alliance. King Hussein bin Talal, King of Jordan, sent his court minister to Baghdad with a message for Faisal, inviting him to go with some ministers to Amman, to consider the consequences of the event. On February 11, 1958, the King of Iraq went with some ministers, the Chief of Staff of the Army, and the Chief of the Royal Court. On the next day, Abd al-Ilah joined them, and there the two parties reached, on February 14, 1958, the declaration of the Arab Hashemite Union between Iraq and Jordan, also known as the "Arab Federation." Originally, Kuwait was to join but Britain was opposed to the unification.

Faisal, as the senior member of the Hashemite family, became its head of state and the head of the Union Government, and in his absence, Hussein would head the Union Government. The Federation was also open to other Arab countries joining it.

== Downfall and death ==
=== An opposition forms ===
Faisal's political situation deteriorated in 1956, with uprisings in the cities of Najaf and Hayy. Meanwhile, Israel's attack on Egypt, coordinated with Britain and France in response to Nasser's nationalization of the Suez Canal, only exacerbated popular revulsion for the Baghdad Pact, and thus Faisal's rule. The opposition began to coordinate its activities; in February 1957, a "Front of National Union" was established, bringing together the National Democrats, Independents, Communists, and the Ba'ath Party. An identical process ensued within the Iraqi officer corps with the formation of a "Supreme Committee of Free Officers". Faisal's government endeavored to preserve the military's loyalty through generous benefits, but this proved increasingly ineffective as more and more officers came to sympathize with the nascent pro-republican anti-monarchist movement.

=== 14 July Revolution ===
In the summer of 1958, King Hussein of Jordan asked for Iraqi military assistance during the escalating Lebanon crisis. Units of the Royal Iraqi Army under the command of Colonel Abdul-Karim Qasim, en route to Jordan, chose to march on Baghdad instead, where they mounted a coup d'état on 14 July. During the 14 July Revolution, Faisal II ordered the Royal Guard to offer no resistance and surrendered to the insurgents. Around 8 am, Captain Abdul Sattar Sabaa Al-Ibousi, leading the revolutionary assault group at the Rihab Palace, which was still the principal royal residence in central Baghdad, ordered the King, Crown Prince 'Abd al-Ilah, Crown Princess Hiyam ('Abd al-Ilah's wife), Princess Nafeesa ('Abd al-Ilah's mother), Princess Abadiya (Faisal's aunt) and several servants to gather in the palace courtyard (the young King had not yet moved into the newly completed Royal Palace). According to Princess Hiyam's biography page, the royal family and royal staff left the palace through the kitchen. When they passed through the kitchen garden, rebel soldiers opened fire. The King was shot in the head and neck, while Nafeesa and Abadiya were shot in the back. Only Princess Hiyam survived the massacre of the royal family, being wounded in the leg or hip. The group was then taken to cars for transport to the Ministry of Defence. The King reportedly died along the way, and the cars were stopped. The King's body was hanged, while the body of the Crown Prince was defiled and dragged through the streets.

=== Aftermath ===
Many years later, when the Iraqi historian Safa Khulusi met Al-Ibousi, who was once one of Khulusi's students, and questioned him on his part in Faisal's death, the former student answered, "all I did was remember Palestine, and the trigger on the machine-gun just set itself off".

During the regime of Saddam Hussein, Faisal II was reburied in a marble tomb located next to that of his father in the restored Royal Cemetery in Baghdad.

== Engagements ==
Faisal initially asked for the hand of Princess Shahnaz Pahlavi, the eldest daughter of Shah Mohammad Reza Pahlavi. However, the offer was rejected by the Shah.

In January 1957, Faisal became engaged to Princess Kiymet Hanım, a descendant of the Mamluk dynasty of Iraq. However, the engagement was broken off three months later.

At the time of his death, the king was scheduled to marry to Princess Sabiha Fazile Hanımsultan (engagement in September 1957), the only daughter of Prince Muhammad 'Ali Ibrahim of Egypt and Ottoman princess Zahra Hanzade Sultan.

== Published work ==
Faisal II was the author of Ways to Defend Yourself (1951), an Arabic book on judo and self-defense, and he printed 50 copies of it and gave it to other kings and leaders, including to his uncle King Abdullah I of Jordan. He also gave a copy of it to the League of Arab Nations, hoping to reprint it and distribute it for free to the youth in Arab countries, but that never happened.

== In popular culture ==
- It has been suggested that Belgian comic creator, Hergé, used young Faisal as the inspiration for the character of Prince Abdullah of Khemed in the fifteenth volume of The Adventures of Tintin: Land of Black Gold. It has even been suggested that the portrait of Prince Abdullah in the same storyline was inspired by the young King's portrait.
- Footage of Faisal along with Abd al-Ilah was shown in The Rock 'n' Roll Years episode "1958" in which the events of the 14 July coup were discussed.

== Military ranks ==
Faisal held the following ranks:

- Admiral of the Fleet, Royal Iraqi Navy.
- Field Marshal, Royal Iraqi Army.
- Marshal of the Royal Iraqi Air Force.
- Air Vice-Marshal (honorary), Royal Air Force.

== Ancestry ==
Hashemites

Hashim (eponymous ancestor)
Abd al-Muttalib
Abu Talib	Abdallah
Muhammad (Islamic prophet)
Ali (fourth caliph)	Fatimah
Hasan (fifth caliph)
Hasan Al-Mu'thanna
Abdullah
Musa Al-Djawn
Abdullah
Musa
Muhammad
Abdullah
Ali
Suleiman
Hussein
Issa
Abd Al-Karim
Muta'in
Idris
Qatada (Sharif of Mecca)
Ali
Hassan (Sharif of Mecca)
Abu Numayy I (Sharif of Mecca)
Rumaythah (Sharif of Mecca)
Ajlan (Sharif of Mecca)
Hassan (Sharif of Mecca)
Barakat I (Sharif of Mecca)
Muhammad (Sharif of Mecca)
Barakat II (Sharif of Mecca)
Abu Numayy II (Sharif of Mecca)
Hassan (Sharif of Mecca)
Abdullah (Sharif of Mecca)
Hussein
Abdullah
Muhsin
Auon, Ra'i Al-Hadala
Abdul Mu'een
Muhammad (Sharif of Mecca)
Ali
Hussein (Sharif of Mecca King of Hejaz)
Ali (King of Hejaz)	Abdullah I (King of Jordan)	Faisal I (King of Syria King of Iraq)	Zeid (pretender to Iraq)
'Abd Al-Ilah (Regent of Iraq)	Talal (King of Jordan)	Ghazi (King of Iraq)	Ra'ad (pretender to Iraq)
Hussein (King of Jordan)	Faisal II (King of Iraq)	Zeid
Abdullah II (King of Jordan)
Hussein (Crown Prince of Jordan)

== Gallery ==
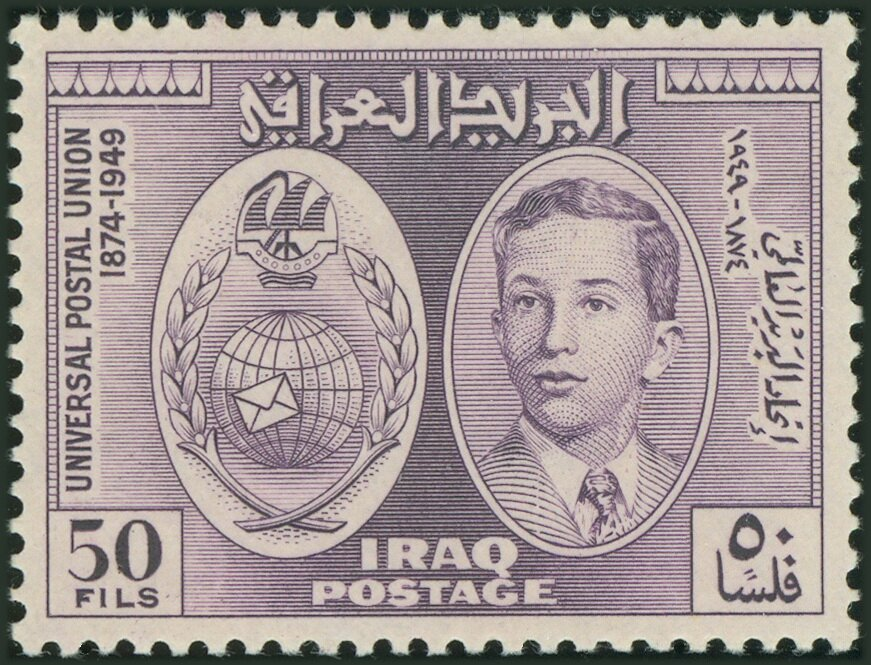
Faisal II stamp from 1949

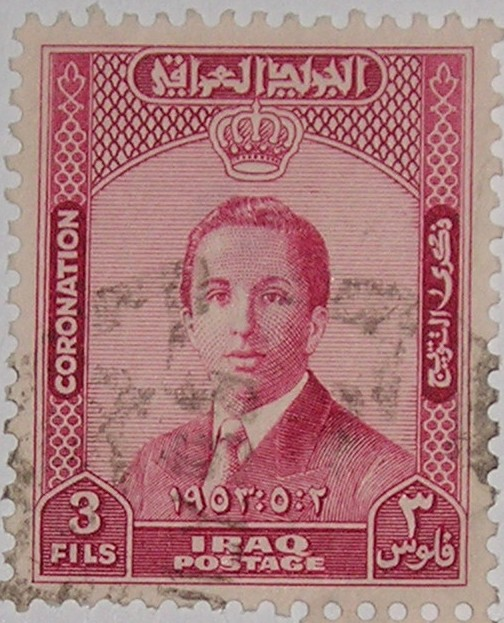
Faisal II stamp from 1953

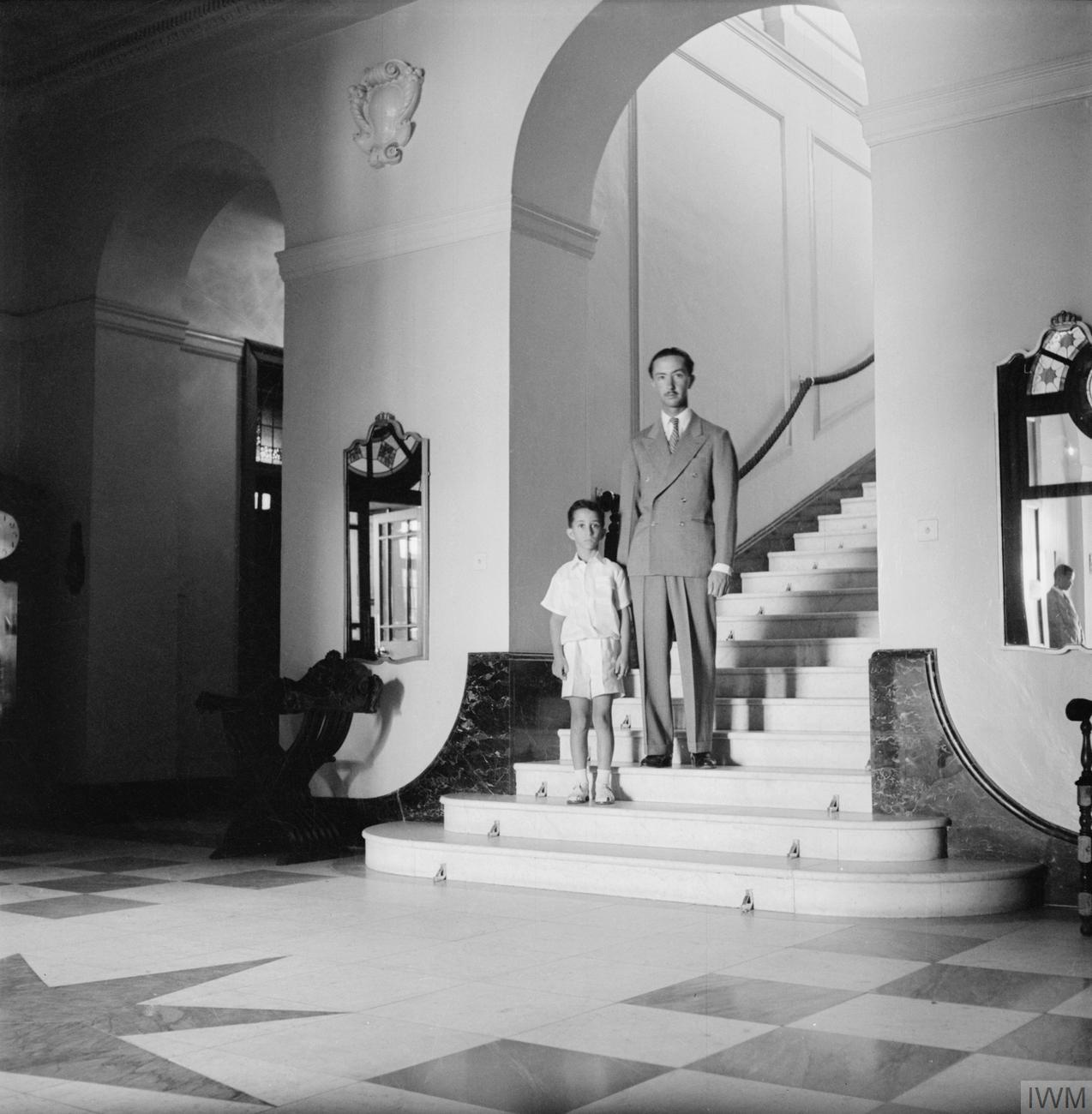
Faisal II with his uncle, Regent Abd al-ilah

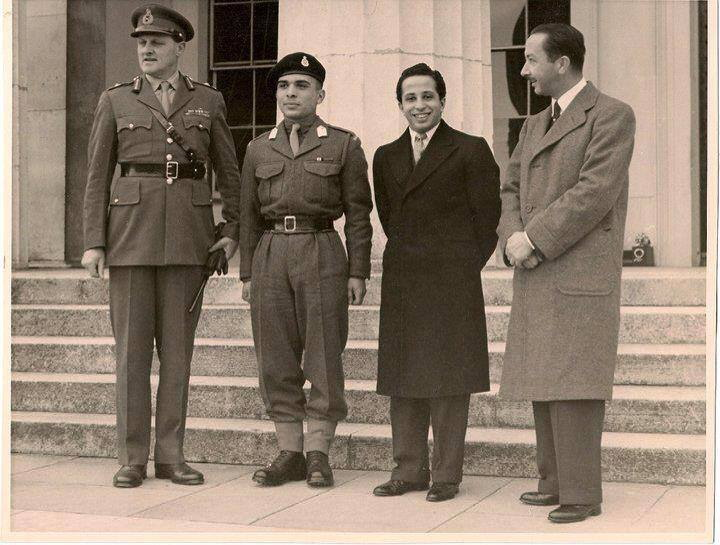
Faisal II with his cousin, Hussein of Jordan, and uncle, Abd al-ilah

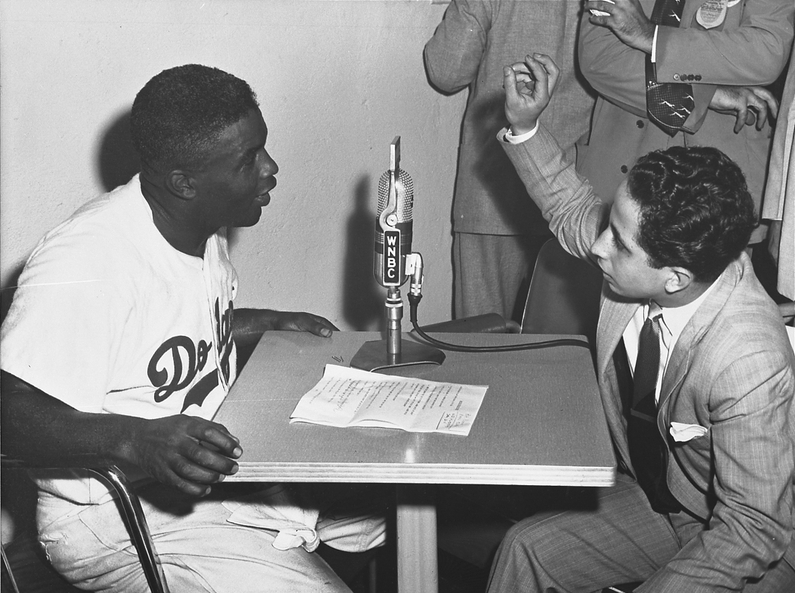
Jackie Robinson interviews Faisal II during his visit to the United States, 1952

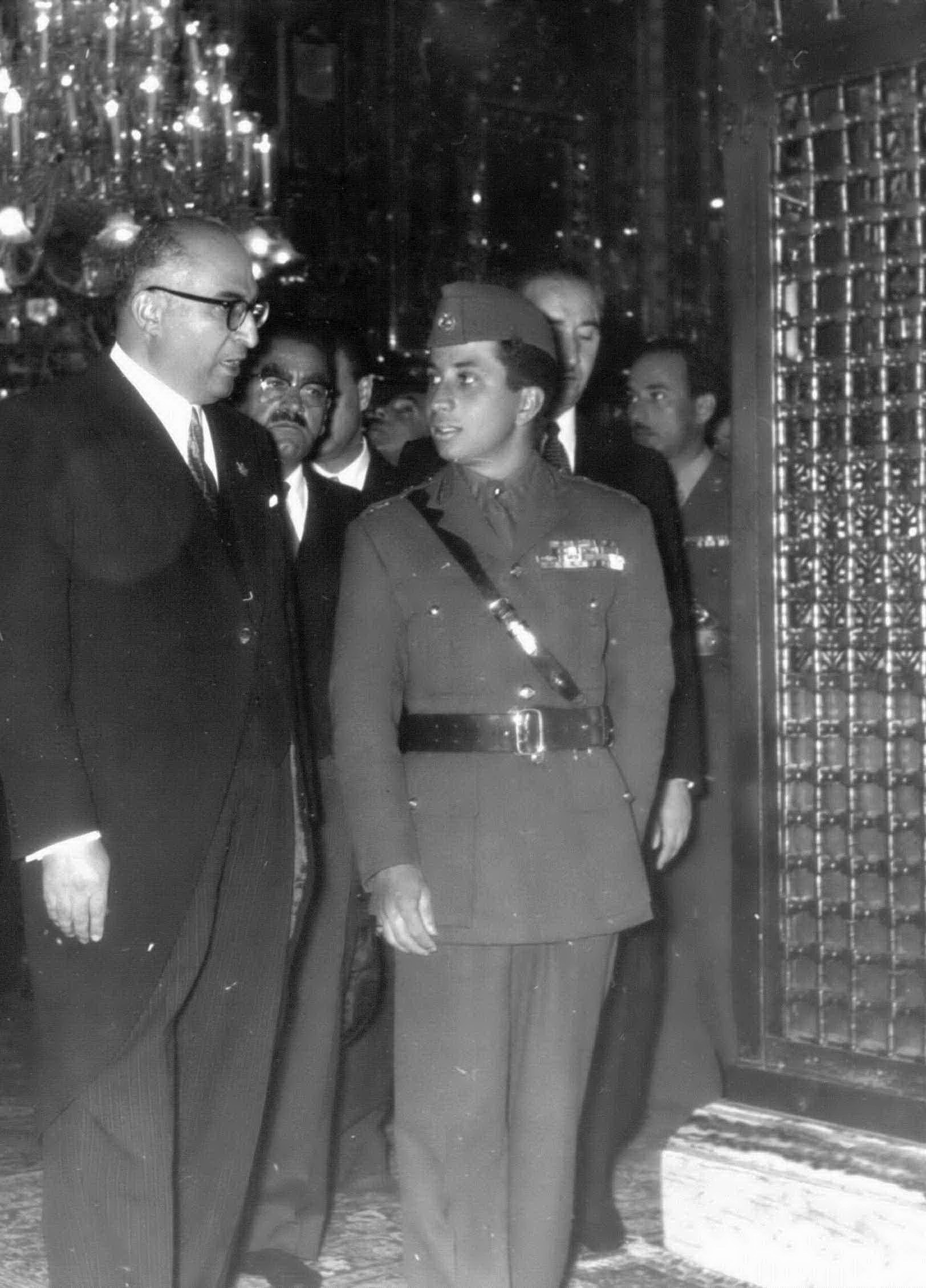
Faisal II at the Imama Reza Shrine, 1957

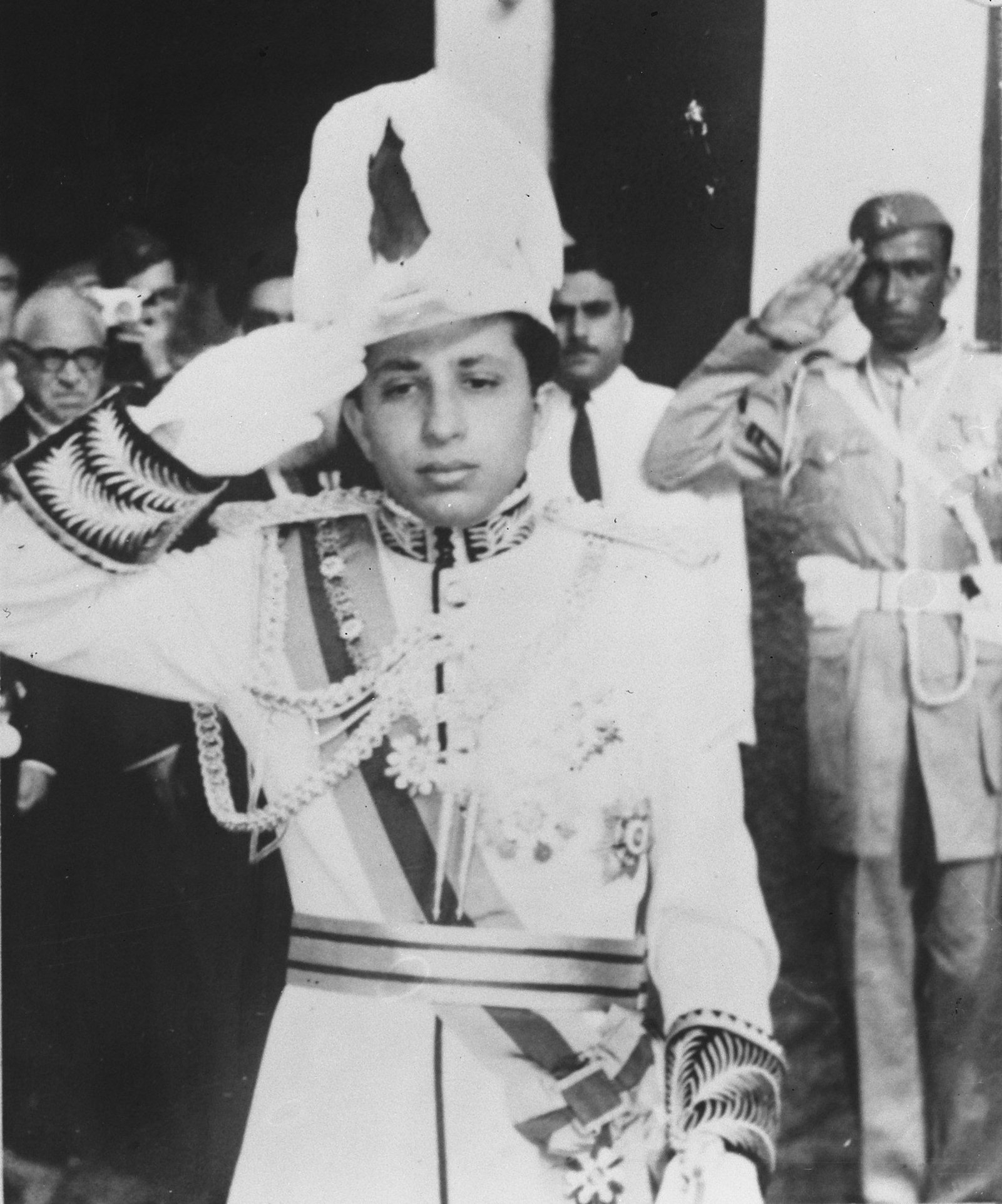
Faisal II in ceremonial uniform

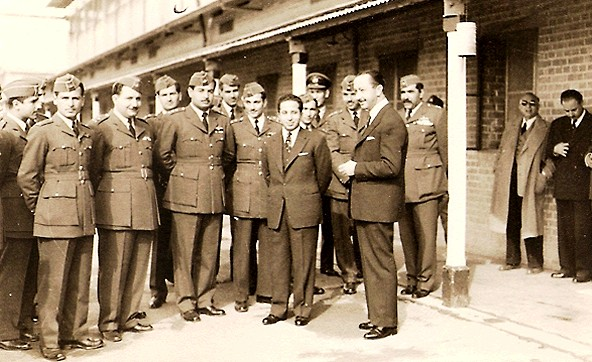
Faisal II with his uncle, Abd al-ilah, and other officers in the Iraqi army and behind them on the right appears Pasha Nuri al-Said

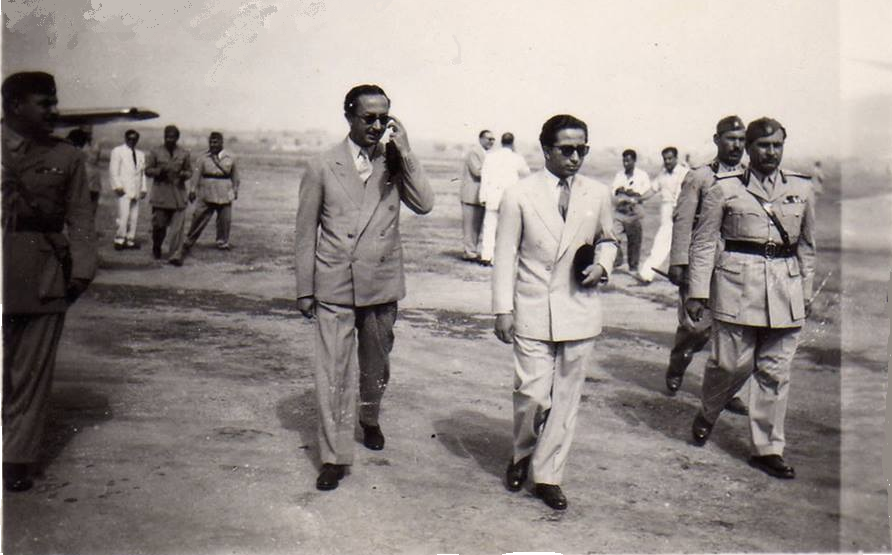
King Faisal II and Abd al-ilah at Mosul Airport with Rafik Aref, Chief of Staff of the Army, on the right of the picture, and Khalil Jassim al-Dabbagh, the commander of the Mosul site, on the left

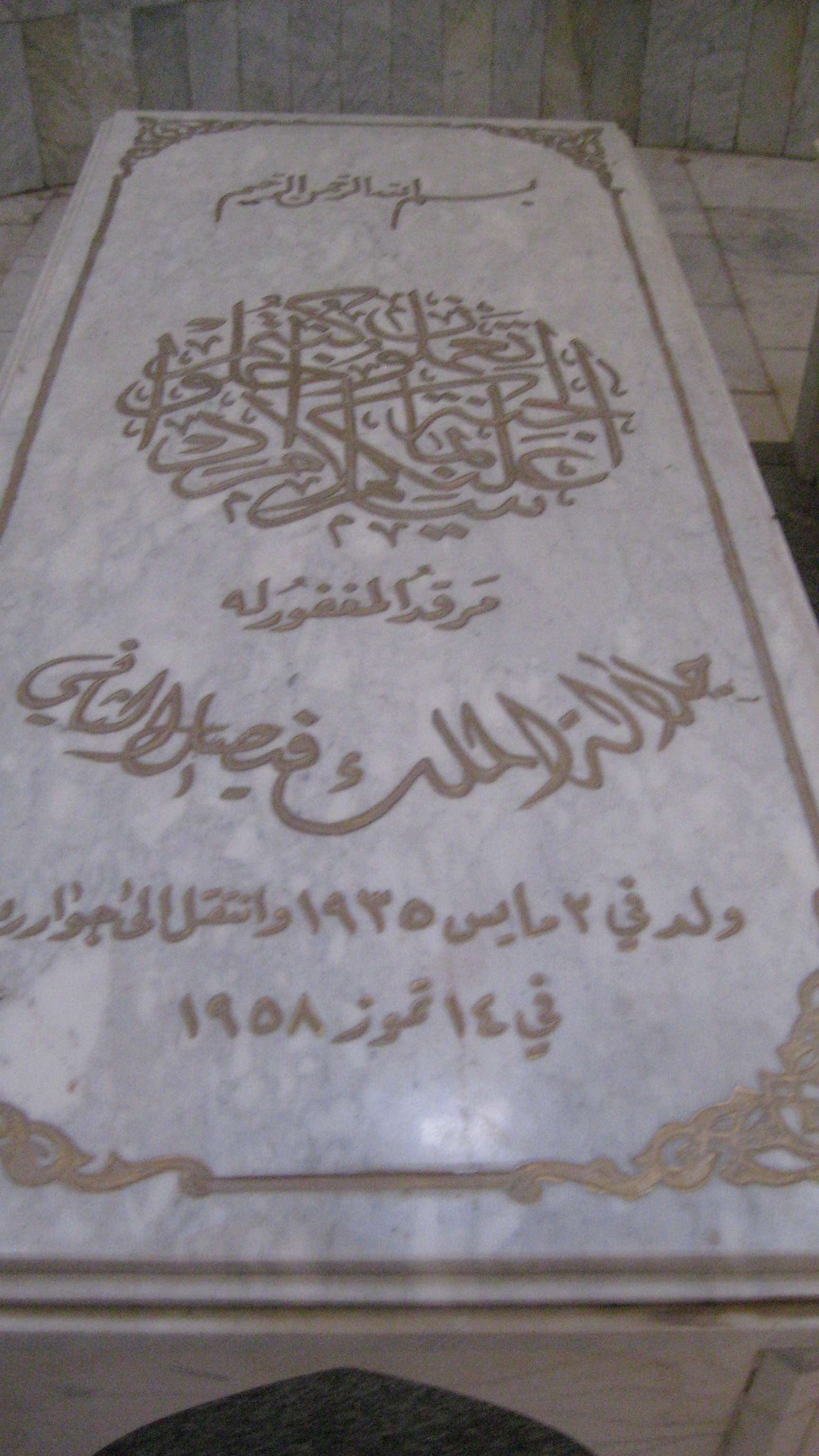
The grave of Faisal II in the Royal Cemetery located in Baghdad

== Namesakes ==
Martyr Faisal II College (Kolleyet Al-Shahid Faisal Al-Thani) is a military school in Jordan that was named after him.

== See also ==
- The late Sharif Ali bin al-Hussein – The cousin of King Faisal II who lived in Iraq and had a political platform to establish a constitutional monarchy in Iraq.
- Prince Ra'ad, head of the royal house of Iraq.
- Nuri al-Said – The Prime Minister of the Hashemite Kingdom of Iraq who was also executed by supporters of Colonel Abdul-Karim Qasim.
- Arab Federation, the short-lived union between Jordan and Iraq where Faisal became its head of state.
- History of Iraq

== Notes ==
Faisal II House of Hāshim Born: 2 May 1935 Died: 14 July 1958
Regnal titles
Preceded by Ghazi I	King of Iraq; 4 April 1939 – 14 July 1958	14 July Revolution
Titles in pretence
Preceded by Ghazi I	— TITULAR — King of Syria; 4 April 1939 – 14 July 1958; Reason for succession failure: Kingdom abolished in 1920	Succeeded by Zeid bin Hussein
Loss of title Monarchy abolished	— TITULAR — King of Iraq; 14 July 1958	Succeeded by Zeid bin Hussein
