= Abd al-Ilah =

Regent and Crown Prince of Iraq (1913–1958)

- Crown Prince
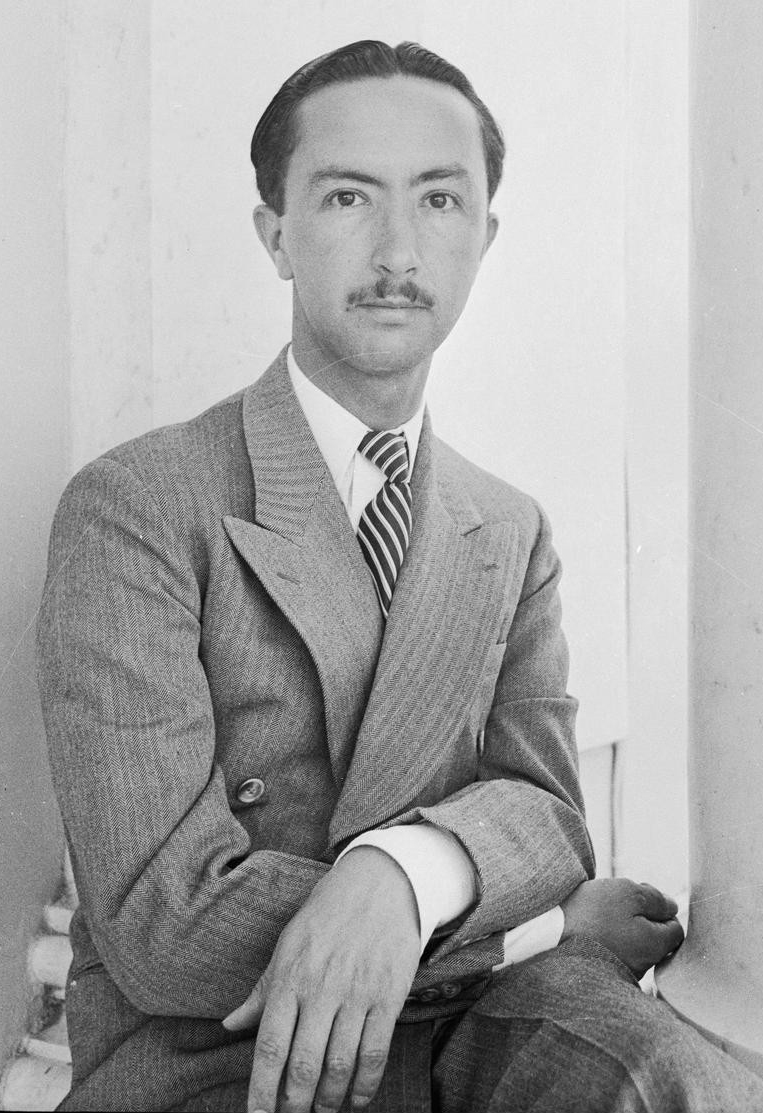
- Portrait by Cecil Beaton, c. 1939-45

Regent of the Kingdom of Iraq
- Regency: 4 April 1939 – 1 April 1941
- Monarch: Faisal II
- Regency: 1 June 1941 – 2 May 1953
- Monarch: Faisal II

Crown Prince of Hejaz
- Tenure: 3 October 1924 – 19 December 1925
- Monarch: Ali bin Hussein I
- Predecessor: Ali bin Hussein I

Crown Prince of Iraq
- Tenure: 10 November 1943 – 14 July 1958
- Monarch: Faisal II
- Predecessor: Faisal II
- Born: 14 November 1913; Ta'if, Hejaz Vilayet, Ottoman Empire
- Died: 14 July 1958 (aged 44); Baghdad, Arab Federation
- Spouse: Melek Khanum; Faiza Khanum; Hiyam Abdullah
- House: House of Hashem
- Father: Ali of Hejaz
- Mother: Nafissa Khanum
- Religion: Sunni Islam

Abd al-Ilah of Hejaz (Arabic: عبد الإله بن علي الهاشمي) GCB, GCMG, GCVO (Arabic: عبد الإله; also written Abdul Ilah or Abdullah; 14 November 1913 – 14 July 1958) was the son of King Ali of Hejaz and a cousin and brother-in-law of King Ghazi of the Hashemite Kingdom of Iraq and was regent for his nephew King Faisal II, from 4 April 1939 to 23 May 1953, when Faisal came of age. Abd al-Ilah also held the title of Crown Prince of Iraq from 1943 to 1953.

Abd al-Ilah was killed along with the rest of the Iraqi royal family in the 14 July Revolution in 1958 that ended the Hashemite monarchy in Iraq. His body was mutilated, dragged across the streets of Baghdad, and eventually burnt.

== Biography ==
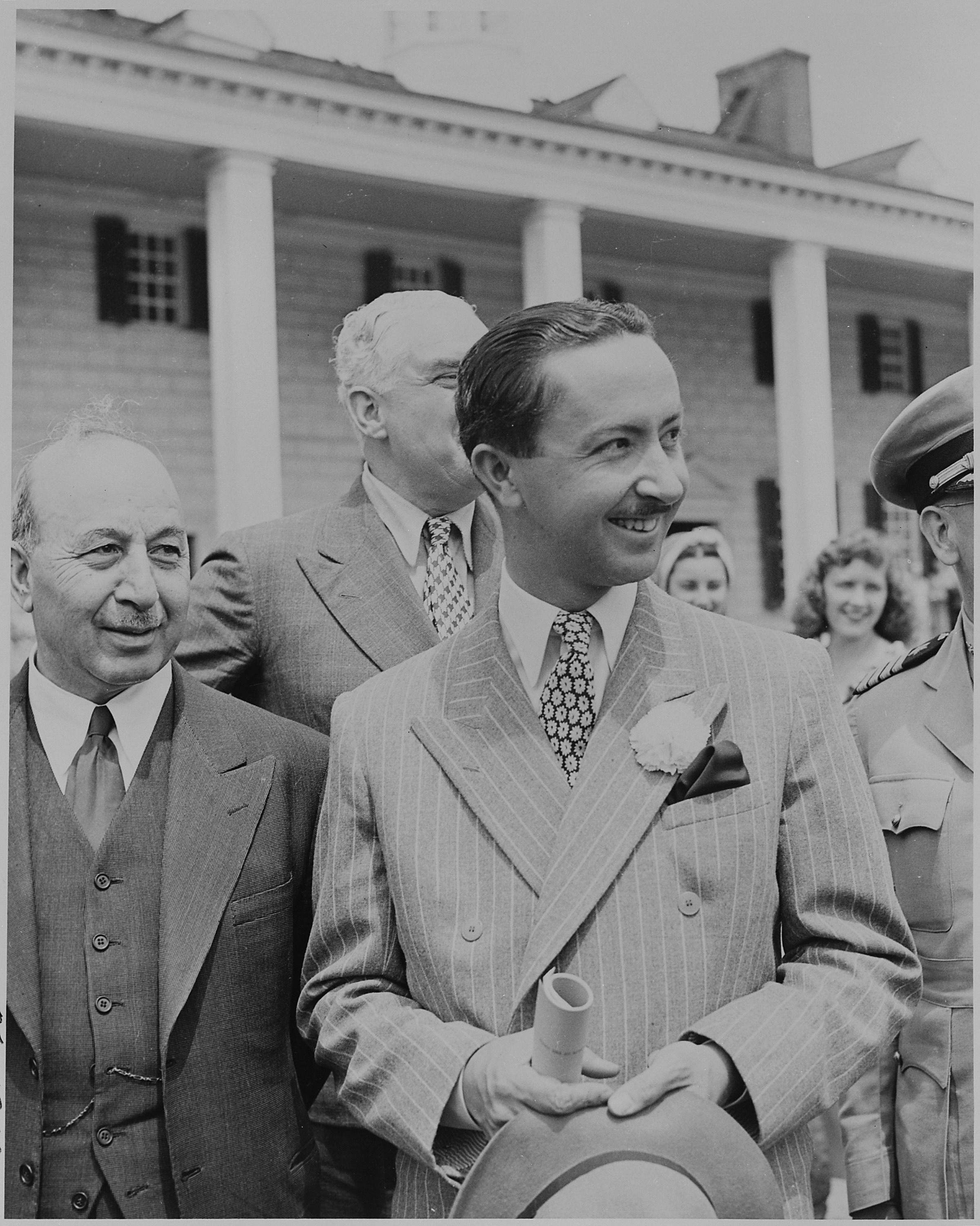
Abd al-Ilah (holding hat) at Mount Vernon in 1945

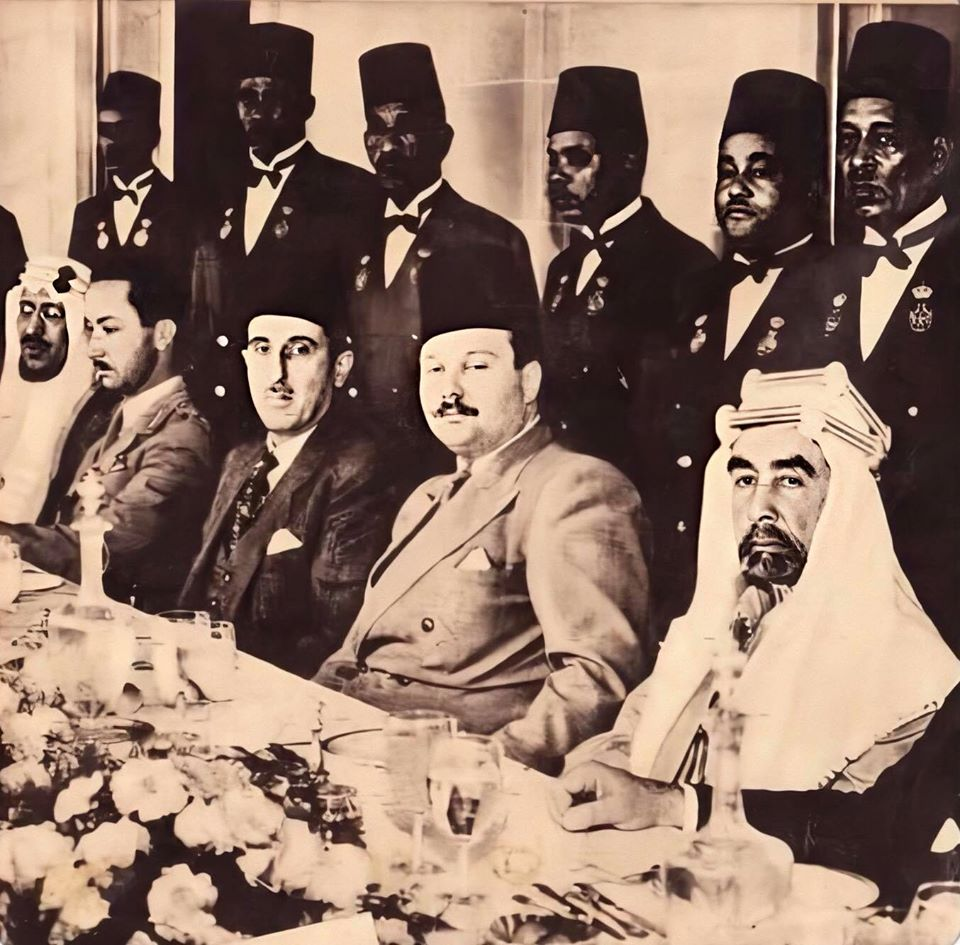
One side of the Anshas conference, from right to left: Abdullah I of Jordan, Farouk I of Egypt and Sudan, Syrian president Shukri al-Quwatli, Abd al-Ilah, and crown prince Saud of Saudi Arabia, Anshas, 1946.

Abd al-Ilah was the son and heir of King Ali ibn Hussein of Hejaz, who was the elder brother of King Faisal I of Iraq, and brother of Aliya bint Ali. His family fled Hejaz when Ibn Saud of Nejd usurped his father's authority. Upon King Ghazi's death in an automobile accident, Abd al-Ilah assumed power in Iraq as Regent for the under-age King Faisal II.

=== 1941 Iraqi coup d'état ===
During World War II, Abd al-Ilah was deposed briefly by former Prime Minister Rashid Ali al-Gaylani. Rashid Ali led a pro-German coup d'état against Abd al-Ilah's pro-British government. After he fled the country, Abd al-Ilah was replaced as regent by Sharaf bin Rajeh, an ageing, religious relative of Faisal II. Abd al-Ilah, fearing for his life, was taken on a daring escape route that led via the US embassy in Baghdad to the RAF base at Habbaniya, before reaching the safety of the British warship HMS Cockchafer and eventually the city of Jerusalem. The deposed regent spent his time with former Prime Minister Nuri al-Said as a refugee in Amman. During his time in exile, Abd al-Ilah was a guest of his uncle Abdullah, the Emir of Transjordan.

On 2 May, the United Kingdom launched an offensive against the Iraqi rebels. On 26 May, The New York Times newspaper reported that Abd al-Ilah had called for an uprising of tribal and religious leaders to help him overthrow the insurgent government. He appealed specifically to the Iraqi people, the army and the police to accomplish "this heavy task".

By 2 June, Rashid Ali's "National Defense Government" had collapsed, and Rashid Ali had fled to Iran. Abd al-Ilah returned to Baghdad and was restored as regent.

Working in tandem with Nuri al-Said, Abd al-Ilah pursued a moderate nationalist approach while maintaining close ties to the Allies.

In 1942, Wendell Willkie travelled to Britain and the Middle East as President Franklin D. Roosevelt's personal representative. In Iraq, Abdul Ilah held a lavish state dinner attended by Willkie.

In 1945, Abd al-Ilah visited the United States. He was the honored guest at the first state dinner hosted by the new American First Lady, Bess Truman. The regent of "friendly Iraq" was awarded a Legion of Merit military decoration by President Harry S. Truman.

In 1953, Crown Prince Abd al-Ilah stepped down when Faisal II came of age. But he continued to be a close adviser of the young King, and an advocate of a pro-Western foreign policy.

In 1955, Iraq adopted the Baghdad Pact (also known as the Central Treaty Organization, or CENTO). The other members of the organization were Iran, Pakistan, Turkey and the United Kingdom. The organization's headquarters were initially located in Baghdad.

In May 1957, King Saud of Saudi Arabia made an eight-day visit to Iraq. He was met on his arrival by Faisal II, Abd al-Ilah, and Prime Minister Nuri al-Said. It was the Saudi king's first ever visit to Iraq, and it commemorated Iraq's membership in the Arab Federation and its break with the United Arab Republic of Gamal Abdel Nasser.

== Death ==
=== 14 July Revolution ===
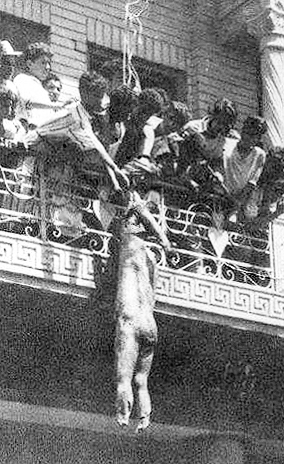
Mutilated corpse of Abd al-Ilah hanging from a balcony.

On 14 July 1958, a coup d'état led by Brigadier Abd al-Karim Qasim toppled the government and brought an end to the Iraqi monarchy. In the ensuing violence brought on by the coup, Abd al-Ilah was killed, along with most of the royal family, at the Al-Rehab Palace. The body of Crown Prince Abd al-Ilah was trailed on al-Rashid street and was cut into pieces. According to the 21 July edition of Time magazine, Gamal Abdel Nasser's Middle East News Agency gleefully described the assassination of Crown Prince Abd al-Ilah: 'The people dragged Abd al-Ilah's body into the street like that of a dog and tore it limb from limb.' Then the mobs burned the body, and hung it at the Ministry of Defense gates.

== Private life ==
In his book Closet Queens, about 20th century British gay politicians, historian and biographer Michael Bloch mentions Prince Abd al-Ilah (whom he calls Prince Abdulilah), on page 157. Bloch describes Prince Abd al-Ilah as being "homosexual" and a close friend of Alan Lennox-Boyd, MP (who was later elevated to the peerage, in 1960, as the 1st Viscount Boyd of Merton). Bloch says that after Abd al-Ilah was killed, "the revolutionaries discovered intimate letters from Lennox-Boyd among the Prince's papers, which they released to the world's press."

On page 159 of the book, Bloch says that Lennox-Boyd and Henry Channon organized a memorial service for their friend, the Prince, in 1958.

In the early 1950s he told a Turkish diplomat that he was very fond of the Club rakı, a brand of Turkish rakı.

== Military ranks and awards ==
Abd al-Ilah held the following ranks:

- Field Marshal, Royal Iraqi Army
- Marshal, Royal Iraqi Air Force
- Honorary Marshal, Royal Air Force

He was awarded the Legion of Merit (Chief Commander) on 1 June 1945.

- Poland (in exile): Order of the White Eagle, 1947.

== Hashemite genealogy ==
Hashemites

Hashim (eponymous ancestor)
Abd al-Muttalib
Abu Talib	Abdallah
Muhammad (Islamic prophet)
Ali (fourth caliph)	Fatimah
Hasan (fifth caliph)
Hasan Al-Mu'thanna
Abdullah
Musa Al-Djawn
Abdullah
Musa
Muhammad
Abdullah
Ali
Suleiman
Hussein
Issa
Abd Al-Karim
Muta'in
Idris
Qatada (Sharif of Mecca)
Ali
Hassan (Sharif of Mecca)
Abu Numayy I (Sharif of Mecca)
Rumaythah (Sharif of Mecca)
Ajlan (Sharif of Mecca)
Hassan (Sharif of Mecca)
Barakat I (Sharif of Mecca)
Muhammad (Sharif of Mecca)
Barakat II (Sharif of Mecca)
Abu Numayy II (Sharif of Mecca)
Hassan (Sharif of Mecca)
Abdullah (Sharif of Mecca)
Hussein
Abdullah
Muhsin
Auon, Ra'i Al-Hadala
Abdul Mu'een
Muhammad (Sharif of Mecca)
Ali
Hussein (Sharif of Mecca King of Hejaz)
Ali (King of Hejaz)	Abdullah I (King of Jordan)	Faisal I (King of Syria King of Iraq)	Zeid (pretender to Iraq)
'Abd Al-Ilah (Regent of Iraq)	Talal (King of Jordan)	Ghazi (King of Iraq)	Ra'ad (pretender to Iraq)
Hussein (King of Jordan)	Faisal II (King of Iraq)	Zeid
Abdullah II (King of Jordan)
Hussein (Crown Prince of Jordan)

== See also ==
- Coup d'état of 1941
- Central Treaty Organization
