= Aliya bint Ali =

Queen of Iraq from 1934 to 1939

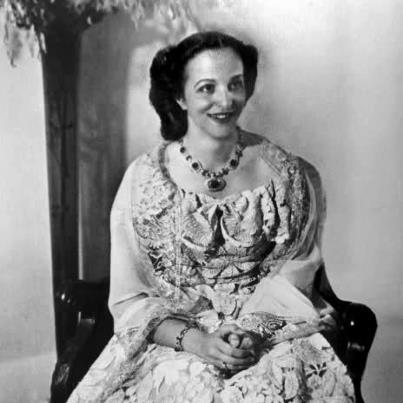

Queen consort of Iraq
- Tenure: 25 January 1934 – 4 April 1939
- Born: 19 January 1911; Mecca, Ottoman Empire
- Died: 21 December 1950 (aged 39); Baghdad, Iraq
- Burial: Royal Mausoleum, Adhamiyah
- Spouse: Ghazi, King of Iraq (m. 1934; died 1939)
- Issue: Faisal II of Iraq
Names
- Aliya bint Ali bin Hussein
- House: Hashemite
- Father: Ali of Hejaz
- Mother: Nafisa Khanum

Aliya bint Ali of Hejaz (Arabic: علياء بنت علي, "noble born"; 19 January 1911 – 21 December 1950), was an Arabian princess and a queen consort of Iraq. She was the spouse and first cousin of King Ghazi of Iraq and the queen mother of King Faisal II of Iraq. She was the second and last Queen of Iraq.

== Early life ==
Princess Aliya (or Alia) was born on 19 January 1911 in Mecca, She was the second daughter of Ali bin Hussein of Hejaz and Princess Nafissa. She was born when her father was in a campaign outside of Mecca so she was raised by her grandfather Sharif Hussein.

When the Arab Revolt started in 1916, Sharif Hussein ordered his grandchildren to be taken to a palace in Shiʽb ʽAli where she and her brother 'Abd al-Ilah and several other family members stayed for the remainder of the revolt. they returned back to Mecca after the end of World War I.

In 1920, Aliya traveled to Damascus with her siblings and mother when her uncle Faisal was declared King of Syria in order to witness his coronation ceremony. She was headed back to Medina and then to Mecca due to fears of war between Syria and France.

When the Kingdom of Hejaz fell to the Saudis in 1925, Aliya and the rest of her family fled to Amman through the port of Jeddah where they were welcomed by emir Abdullah I of Jordan where they stayed in his palace. Meanwhile, her father Ali went to Baghdad to stay with his brother Faisal I who had become the King of Iraq, and after three months of his arrival, Faisal called for his nephew Abd al-Ilah and the rest of the family to come to Baghdad so they could reunite with their father. In Baghdad, Aliya and her sisters were educated by Iraqi teachers handpicked by their uncle Faisal and mother Nafissa.

== Queen of Iraq ==
On 25 January 1934, Aliya bint Ali married her first cousin, King Ghazi I of Iraq, in Baghdad, the capital of the Hashemite Kingdom of Iraq. They had one son, Faisal II.

Queen Aliya, possibly through her "adherents," was suspected by the British to have something to do with the death of a young servant of the palace in 1938. King Ghazi was suspected of having an extra-marital affair with a young male Iraqi servant. British sources wrote about the incident, that King Ghazi’s bad reputation was tarnished “further” when a “Negro youth,” who was employed at the Royal Al-Zuhour Palace, died by “accidentally” discharging his revolver when he did not remove it before his afternoon nap.

An official police expert ruled that the Palace's explanation was consistent with the police examination, but the British suspected that one of the Queen's “adherents” might have killed the boy, as the boy was suspected to be “the King’s boon companion in debauchery” and the Queen, therefore, had a “deep aversion” to the boy. The King was in a panic after this incident, fearing imminent assassination.

== Queen mother ==
Queen Aliya and King Ghazi lived separated at the time of the king's death. When Ghazi died in a car crash on 4 April 1939, the politician Nuri al-Said was widely suspected of being implicated in his death. At the Royal funeral, crowds chanted: “You will answer for the blood of Ghazi, Nuri.” Nuri was suspected to have been in contact with the estranged Queen Aliya and plotted with the brother of the Queen, 'Abd al-Ilah, to depose the King. Aliya supported the accession of 'Abd al-Ilah as regent for Ghazi's successor, Faisal II, who was still a minor. She stated that her late husband had wished her brother to act as regent if he died while his son was still a minor.

During the 1941 Iraqi coup d'état by Rashid Ali al-Gaylani, when her brother the regent and Nuri as-Said left for Jordan, she remained in Iraq in order to protect her son's interests, and played an important role in refusing the conspirators to force the abdication of her son and the abolition of the monarchy.

Queen Aliya had treatment in London in Summer 1949 and returned to Baghdad in October 1950. She died of intestinal cancer in Baghdad in December 1950.

== Legacy ==
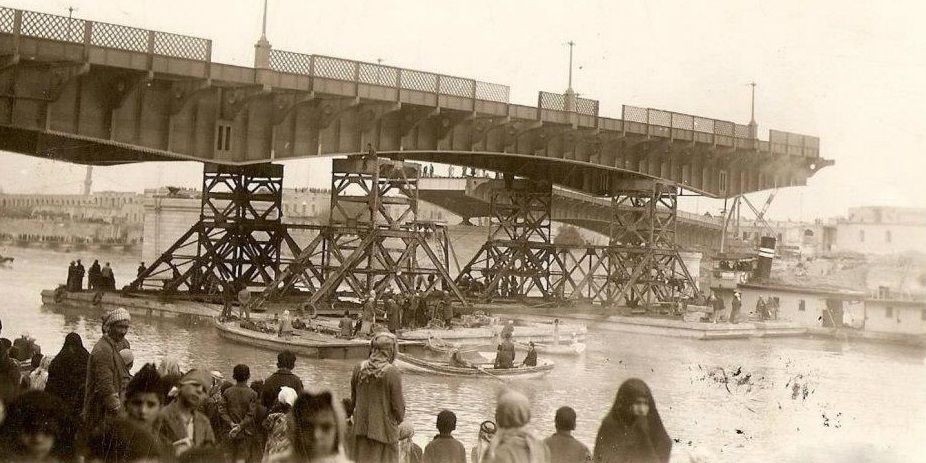
Queen Aliya bint Ali Bridge of Baghdad under construction - 1939

The Queen Aliya College for girls (1946–47) was named after her.

== Honours ==
National Honours

- Dame Grand Cordon of the Order of the Hashemites.

Aliya bint Ali House of Hāshim Born: 1911 1950
Regnal titles
Preceded by Huzaima bint Nasser	Queen of Iraq; 1934-1939	Vacant Title next held by Kingdom abolished in 1958
