= Muhammad ibn Barakat =

Sharif of Mecca (1437-1497)

Muhammad ibn Barakat محمد بن بركات

Sharif of Mecca
- Reign: Sha'ban 859 – Muharram 903 AH; August 1455 – September 1497
- Predecessor: Barakat I
- Successor: Barakat II
- Born: Ramadan 840 AH; March/April 1437; Mecca
- Died: 11 Muharram 903 AH c. 9 September 1497 (aged 60); Wadi Marr al-Zahran (present-day Wadi Fatimah, Mecca Province, Saudi Arabia)
- Burial: Cemetery of al-Ma'lah; Mecca
- House: Banu Hashim; Banu Qatadah
- Father: Barakat I

Muḥammad ibn Barakāt ibn Ḥasan ibn ‘Ajlān (Arabic: محمد بن بركات بن حسن بن عجلان; 1437 – c. 9 September 1497) was Sharif of Mecca from 1455 to 1497. As a vassal of the Sultan of Egypt his authority extended over the entire Hejaz.

He was born in Ramadan 840 AH (March/April 1437), the son of Barakat I, Sharif of Mecca. In 859 AH (1455) Barakat's health deteriorated, and he petitioned the Sultan to appoint his son as his replacement. Barakat died on Monday, 19 Sha'ban 859 AH (4 August 1455), and it so happened that the Sultan's reply—dated 16 Rajab 859 AH (c. 2 July 1455)—arrived from Egypt the following day, accompanied by a robe of investiture (khil'ah) for Sharif Muhammad. On 4 Shawwal (c. 17 September) Muhammad received condolences from the Sultan and his formal decree of appointment (tawqi).

In the year 878 AH (1473/1474) Sultan Qaitbay appointed Muhammad's son Barakat as co-regent.

Sharif Muhammad died on 11 Muharram 903 AH (c. 9 September 1497) at Wadi Marr al-Zahran (present-day Wadi Fatimah). He was buried in the Cemetery of al-Ma'lah in Mecca, and a tomb was built over his grave.

== Issue ==
He had sixteen sons, besides daughters. Among his sons were:

- Humaydah, Sharif of Mecca
- Jazan, Sharif of Mecca
- Hazza', Sharif of Mecca
- Barakat II, Sharif of Mecca
- Qayitbay, Sharif of Mecca
- Ali
- Rajih
- Rumaythah

== Bibliography ==
- de Zambaur, E. (1927). Manuel de généalogie et de chronologie pour l'histoire de l'Islam (in French). Hanovre: Heinz Lafaire. p. 22.
- Hicaz vilayeti salnamesi (حجاز ولايتى سالنامه‌سى) [Yearbook of the Hejaz Vilayet] (in Ottoman Turkish) (5th ed.). Hicaz: Vilayet matbaasında tabʻ olunmuştur. 1892. pp. 112–114. hdl:2027/mdp.39015049569422.
- al-‘Aṣimī, ‘Abd al-Malik ibn Ḥusayn (1998). ‘Ādil Aḥmad ‘Abd al-Mawjūd; ‘Alī Muḥammad Mu‘awwaḍ (eds.). Samṭ al-nujūm al-'awālī fī anbā' al-awā'il wa-al-tawālī سمط النجوم العوالي في أنباء الأوائل والتوالي (in Arabic). Vol. 4. Bayrūt: Dār al-Kutub al-‘Ilmīyah.
- al-Ghāzī, ‘Abd Allāh ibn Muḥammad (2009). ‘Abd al-Malik ibn ‘Abd Allāh ibn Duhaysh (ed.). Ifādat al-anām إفادة الأنام (in Arabic). Vol. 3 (1st ed.). Makkah: Maktabat al-Asadī.
- Daḥlan, Aḥmad Zaynī (2007) [1887/1888]. Khulāṣat al-kalām fī bayān umarā' al-Balad al-Ḥarām خلاصة الكلام في بيان أمراء البلد الحرام (in Arabic). Dār Arḍ al-Ḥaramayn.
- al-Ziriklī, Khayr ad-Dīn (2002) [1967]. "محمد بن بركات / Muḥammad ibn Barakāt". الأعلام / al-A‘lām (in Arabic). Vol. 6 (15th ed.). Bayrūt: Dār al-‘Ilm lil-Malāyīn. pp. 51–52.
- Wensinck, A. J.; Bosworth, C. E. (1991). "Makka: From the 'Abbāsid to the modern period". The Encyclopaedia of Islam. Vol. 6. Leiden: Brill. pp. 149–150.

Muhammad ibn Barakat House of Qatadah Born: March/April 1437 Died: c. 9 September 1497
Regnal titles
Preceded by Barakat I	Sharif of Mecca; 1455–1497 with Barakat II (1473/4 – 1497)	Succeeded by Barakat II
