= Abu Numayy II =

Sharif of Mecca (1506-1584)

Muhammad Abu Numayy II محمد أبو نمي الثاني

Sharif of Mecca
- Reign: 1512–1566
- Predecessor: Qayitbay ibn Muhammad
- Successor: Hasan ibn Abi Numayy
- Co-ruler: Barakat II; Ahmad ibn Abi Numayy; Hasan ibn Abi Numayy
- Born: 9 Dhu al-Hijjah 911 AH c. 3 May 1506; Mecca, Mamluk Sultanate
- Died: 9/10 Muharram 992 AH c. 23 January 1584 (aged 77); Wadi al-Abar, Ottoman Empire
- Burial: Jannat al-Mu'alla; Mecca, Saudi Arabia
- Issue: Ahmad, Sharif of Mecca; Hasan, Sharif of Mecca
- House: Banu Hashim; Banu Qatadah
- Father: Barakat II

Muḥammad Abū Numayy II ibn Barakāt ibn Muḥammad (Arabic: محمد أبو نمي الثاني بن بركات بن محمد c. 3 May 1506 – c. 23 January 1584) was Sharif of Mecca from 1512 to 1566. He co-reigned first with his father (1512–1525) and later with his sons (1540–1566).

Muhammad Abu Numayy was born in Mecca on the night of 9 Dhu al-Hijjah 911 AH (c. 3 May 1506), the son of Sharif Barakat II. His mother was Sharifah Ghabyah, the daughter of Humaydan ibn Shaman al-Husayni, Emir of Medina.

At the age of six he was appointed co-ruler with his father by the Sharif's Mamluk suzerain, Sultan Qansuh al-Ghawri of Egypt. In 1517 after the Ottoman conquest of Egypt, Barakat quickly recognized the change in sovereignty. He sent Abu Numayy to Sultan Selim I in Cairo, bearing the keys to the holy cities and other gifts, and the Sultan confirmed Barakat and Abu Numayy in their positions as co-rulers of the Hejaz. Following his father's death in 1525 Abu Numayy assumed sole rulership of the Hejaz. Later in 947 AH (1540) he secured from Sultan Suleiman I the appointment of his eldest son Ahmad as his co-ruler, and then the appointment of his next eldest son, Hasan, after Ahmad's death in 961 AH (1554).

In 974 AH (1566/1567) Abu Numayy received permission to abdicate in favor of Sharif Hasan. After retiring from the Sharifate he devoted his time to worship and religious studies while continuing to assist his son in an advisory capacity. He died on 9 Muharram 992 AH (c. 23 January 1584) (Note: Most sources state he died on 9 Muharram, though Dahlan writes, "he died on the ninth of Muharram, and it is [also] said the tenth, in the year 992...") at Wadi al-Abar, south of Mecca. He was prayed over in Masjid al-Haram and buried in Jannat al-Mu'alla, where a tomb was constructed over his grave.

== Bibliography ==
- de Zambaur, E. (1927). Manuel de généalogie et de chronologie pour l'histoire de l'Islam. Hanovre: Heinz Lafaire.
- Uzunçarşılı, İsmail Hakkı (2003). Ashrāf Makkat al-Mukarramah wa-umarāʼihā fī al-ʻahd al-ʻUthmānī أشراف مكة المكرمة وأمرائها في العهد العثماني (in Arabic). Translated by Murād, Khalīl ʻAlī (1st ed.). Beirut: al-Dār al-‘Arabīyah lil-Mawsū‘āt.
- al-Sibā‘ī, Aḥmad ibn Muḥammad Aḥmad (1999) [1419 AH (1998/1999)]. Tārīkh Makkah تاريخ مكة (in Arabic). al-Amānah al-‘āmah lil-iḥtifāl bi murūr mi’ah ‘ām ‘alá ta’sīs al-Mamlakah al-‘Arabīyah al-Su‘ūdīyah.
- al-‘Aṣimī, ‘Abd al-Malik ibn Ḥusayn (1998). ‘Ādil Aḥmad ‘Abd al-Mawjūd; ‘Alī Muḥammad Mu‘awwaḍ (eds.). Samṭ al-nujūm al-'awālī fī anbā' al-awā'il wa-al-tawālī سمط النجوم العوالي في أنباء الأوائل والتوالي (in Arabic). Vol. 4. Bayrūt: Dār al-Kutub al-‘Ilmīyah.
- al-’Anqāwī, Aḥmad Ḍiyā’ ibn Muḥammad (2005). Mu'jam ashrāf al-Ḥijāz fī Bilād al-Ḥaramayn معجم أشراف الحجاز في بلاد الحرمين (in Arabic). Vol. 3 (1st ed.). Bayrūt: Mu’assasat al-Rayyān.
- al-Ghāzī, ‘Abd Allāh ibn Muḥammad (2009). ‘Abd al-Malik ibn ‘Abd Allāh ibn Duhaysh (ed.). Ifādat al-anām إفادة الأنام (in Arabic). Vol. 3 (1st ed.). Makkah: Maktabat al-Asadī.
- Daḥlan, Aḥmad Zaynī (2007) [1887/1888]. Khulāṣat al-kalām fī bayān umarā' al-Balad al-Ḥarām خلاصة الكلام في بيان أمراء البلد الحرام (in Arabic). Dār Arḍ al-Ḥaramayn.

Abu Numayy II House of Qatadah Born: c. 3 May 1506 Died: c. 23 January 1584
Regnal titles
Preceded by Qayitbay ibn Muhammad	Sharif of Mecca; 1512–1566 with Barakat II (1512–1525); Ahmad ibn Abi Numayy (1540–1554); Hasan ibn Abi Numayy (1554–1566)	Succeeded by Hasan ibn Abi Numayy
