= Al-Rehab Palace =

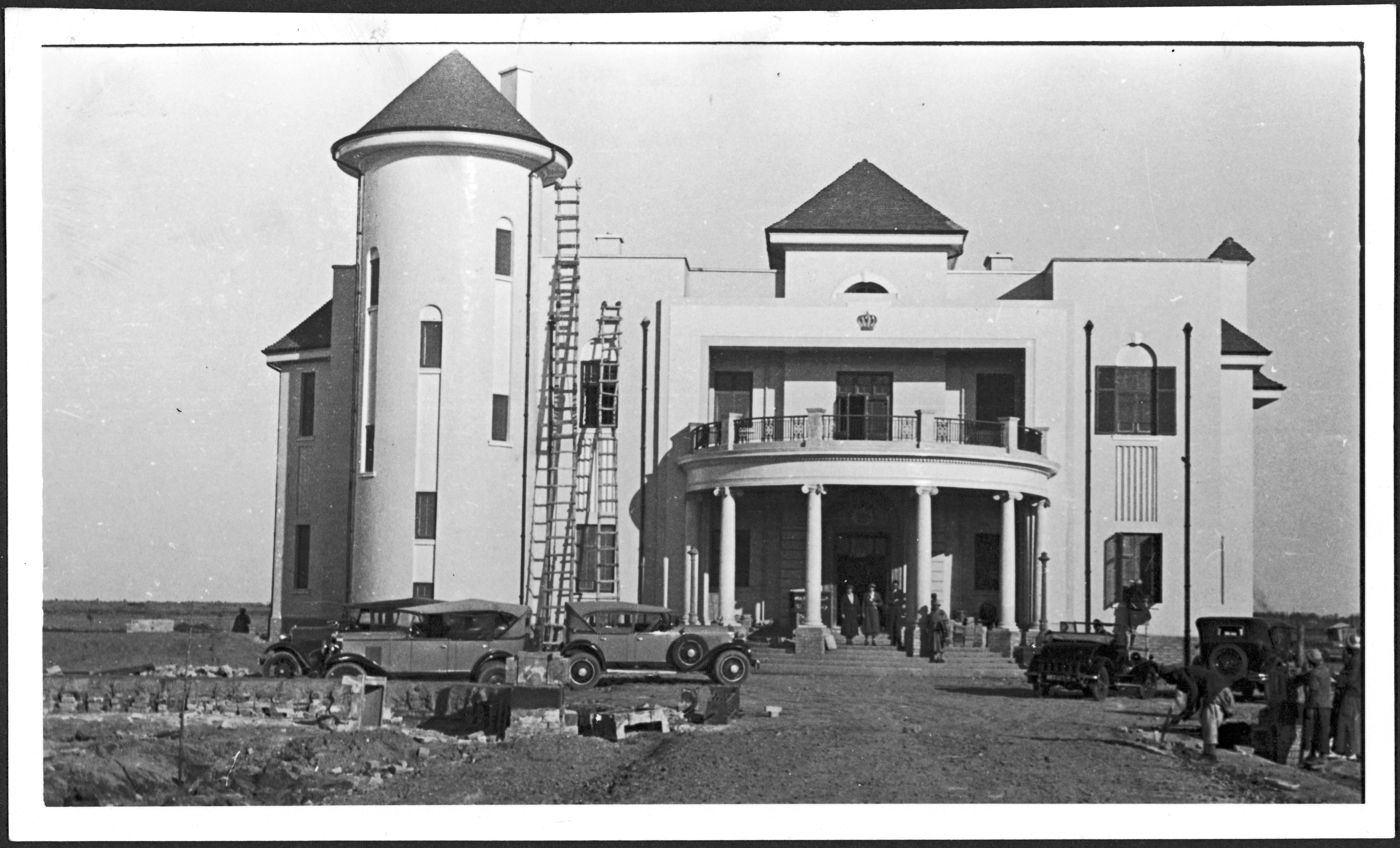
- Al-Rehab Palace
- Interactive map of the Al-Rehab Palace area

General information
- Location: Al-Mansour, Baghdad, Iraq
- Coordinates: 33°19′15″N 44°23′25″E
- Demolished: 1973
- Owner: Iraqi Royal Family

The Al-Rehab Palace, also known as Qasr al-Rihab, (Arabic: قصر الرحاب) was a palace in Baghdad, Iraq, constructed on the orders of King Faisal II. It was the private residence of the Iraqi royal family between 1937 and 1958, during the reign of Faisal II.

== History ==
The palace was constructed at the cost of the royal family in the Al-Mansour suburb. It succeeded the Al-Zuhour Palace as the private residence of the royal family.

It was to be the last residence of the Iraqi royal family. In the 1950s, the New Royal Palace was built to replace it, but it was not inhabited before the monarchy was abolished.

The Al-Rehab Palace was the scene of the massacre of the royal family during the 14 July Revolution in 1958.

The building was torn down in 1973.
