= Ghalib ibn Musa'id =

Ghalib ibn Musa'id غالب بن مساعد

Sharif and Emir of Mecca
- Reign: 1788 – April 1803
- Predecessor: Abd al-Mu'in ibn Musa'id
- Successor: Abd al-Mu'in ibn Musa'id
- Reign: July 1803 – 1813
- Predecessor: Abd al-Mu'in ibn Musa'id
- Successor: Yahya ibn Surur
- Died: Selanik, Ottoman Empire
- Issue: Abd al-Muttalib
- House: Banu Hashim; Banu Qatadah; Dhawu Zayd
- Father: Musa'id ibn Sa'id

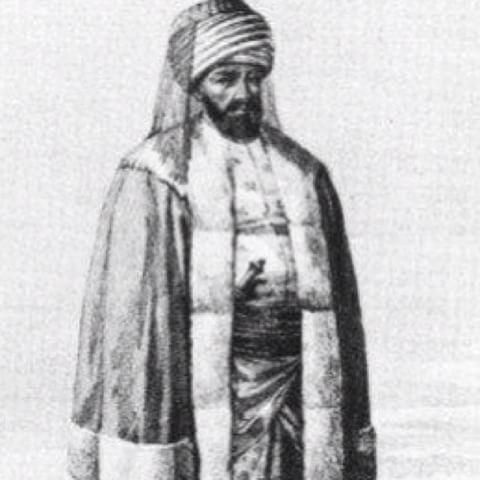
Ghalib ibn Musa'id

Ghālib ibn Musā‘id ibn Sa‘īd (Arabic: غالب بن مساعد بن سعيد) was a sharif who served as Sharif and Emir of Mecca from 1788 to 1813.

== Succession to the Emirate ==
Ghalib was the son of the Emir of Mecca Musa'id ibn Sa'id (r. 1752-1770). After Musa'id's death the Emirate was held by Ghalib's uncle Ahmad ibn Sa'id (r. 1770-1773), then his brother Surur ibn Musa'id (r. 1773-1788). After Surur's death on 18 Rabi al-Thani 1202 AH (c. 27 January 1788), his brother Abd al-Mu'in assumed the Emirate. However, he reigned for only a day or part of a day (or a few days, according to some sources) before abdicating in favor of Ghalib. News of Surur's death reached Istanbul in mid-Sha'ban (May 1788), and Sultan Abdul Hamid I confirmed Ghalib's appointment. The imperial firman (proclamation) and khil'ah (robe of honor) arrived in Mecca on 29 Dhi al-Qi'dah 1202 AH (c. 1 September 1788).

== Conflict with his brothers ==
On 11 Dhu al-Hijjah 1202 AH (c. 12 September 1788) Ghalib's brother (Bader) came out in opposition against his rule. They left Mecca while stealing his camels and recruited fighters from the Hudhayl tribe to their cause. On 19 Dhu al-Hijjah (c. 20 September 1788) the two sides met in battle near Mecca and Ghalib was victorious. The rebels next attempted to capture Ta'if but were defeated by Ghalib's deputy. On 8 Rabi al-Awwal 1203 AH (c. 7 December 1788) Ghalib's army defeated them again when they advanced on Mecca. In mid-Jumada al-Awwal (February 1789) they allied with the Thaqif tribe and captured Ta'if from Ghalib's deputy. When Ghalib received word that his brothers were preparing to attack Mecca he sent word to the Bedouin tribes for support. On 19 Jumada al-Awwal (c. 15 February 1789) he amassed his troops at al-Ma'abidah and paid 7 riyals to every Bedouin who joined him. When the rebels learned of the force that Ghalib had assembled they halted their advance and returned to Ta'if. On 24 Jumada al-Awwal (c. 20 February 1789), Ghalib and his brothers negotiated a peace agreement with the mediation of Sayyid Nasir ibn Mastur and several leading ulama.

== Resisting the French Invasion of Egypt ==
During the French invasion of Egypt and Syria led by Napoleon he sent 3000 men to Qena by the end of February 1799 to fight the advancing French forces

== Deposition ==
He was deposed by Muhammad Ali Pasha in Dhi al-Qi'dah 1228 AH (October/November 1813). Muhammad Ali exiled Ghalib to Egypt, but in 1814 the central government arranged for him to be moved along with his family to Selanik (Thessaloniki).

== Notes ==
Ghalib ibn Musa'id ibn Sa'id ibn Sa'd ibn Zayd 'House of Zayd; Branch of the House of Qatadah'
Regnal titles
| Preceded by Abd al-Mu'in ibn Musa'id | Sharif and Emir of Mecca; 1788 – April 1803 | Succeeded by Abd al-Mu'in ibn Musa'id |
| Preceded by Abd al-Mu'in ibn Musa'id | Sharif and Emir of Mecca; July 1803 – 1813 | Succeeded by Yahya ibn Surur |
