= Abd al-Mu'in ibn Musa'id =

Abd al-Mu'in ibn Musa'id عبد المعين بن مساعد

Sharif and Emir of Mecca
- Reign: January 1788
- Predecessor: Surur ibn Musa'id
- Successor: Ghalib ibn Musa'id
- Reign: April 1803 – July 1803
- Predecessor: Ghalib ibn Musa'id
- Successor: Ghalib ibn Musa'id
- House: Banu Hashim; Banu Qatadah; Dhawu Zayd
- Father: Musa'id ibn Sa'id

‘Abd al-Mu‘īn ibn Musā‘id ibn Sa‘īd (Arabic: عبد المعين بن مساعد بن سعيد) was a sharif of the Zayd clan who briefly served as Sharif and Emir of Mecca on two occasions – first in January 1788, and second during April–July 1803.

He succeeded to the Emirate in January 1788 after the death of his brother Sharif Surur, but he abdicated to his brother Sharif Ghalib within a few days. He assisted Ghalib during his rule, leading several military expeditions against the Saudi-Wahhabi Emirate of Diriyah. In April 1803 when Wahhabi forces marched on Mecca, Ghalib appointed Abd al-Mu'in as acting Emir before retreating to Jeddah. Abd al-Mu'in surrendered the city to Saud ibn Abd al-Aziz and was installed as Emir under Saudi suzerainty. In July 1803 he allowed Sharif Ghalib to enter the city with his army and drive out the Wahhabi garrison.

== Notes ==
Abd al-Mu'in ibn Musa'id ibn Sa'id ibn Sa'd ibn Zayd House of Zayd; Branch of the House of Qatadah
Regnal titles
Preceded by Surur ibn Musa'id	Sharif and Emir of Mecca; January 1788	Succeeded by Ghalib ibn Musa'id
Preceded by Ghalib ibn Musa'id	Sharif and Emir of Mecca; April–July 1803	Succeeded by Ghalib ibn Musa'id
