= Ahmad ibn Sa'id =

Ahmad ibn Sa'id أحمد بن سعيد

Sharif and Emir of Mecca
- Reign: May 1770 – 13 July 1770
- Predecessor: Abd Allah ibn Musa'id
- Successor: Abd Allah ibn Husayn
- Reign: October 1770 – 6 February 1773
- Predecessor: Abd Allah ibn Husayn
- Successor: Surur ibn Musa'id
- Died: c. 15 April 1781; Jeddah, Ottoman Empire
- House: Banu Hashim; Banu Qatadah; Dhawu Zayd
- Father: Sa'id ibn Sa'd

Aḥmad ibn Sa‘īd ibn Sa‘d (Arabic: أحمد بن سعيد بن سعد; d. c. 15 April 1781) was a sharif of the Zayd clan who served as Sharif and Emir of Mecca from 1770 to 1773.

After the death of his brother Musa'id in late Muharram 1184 AH (May 1770) his brother Abd Allah succeeded to the Emirate, having been nominated by Musa'id before his death. Ahmad, desiring the Emirate for himself, deposed his brother and appointed himself as Emir. He sent word to Istanbul of the change in office, but before the customary proclamation and khil'ah (robe of honor) arrived from the capital he was deposed by the ruler of Egypt, Ali Bey al-Kabir, who replaced him with Abd Allah ibn Husayn of the rival Barakat clan. Abd Allah entered Mecca with a forged firman on Friday, 18 Rabi al-Awwal 1184 AH (13 July 1770) supported by Egyptian troops led by Muhammad Bey Abu al-Dhahab, and was installed as Emir on the same day. In early October Ahmad resumed the Emirate after defeating Abd Allah's forces with the support of Bedouin allies.

On 6 February 1773 Ahmad was unseated by his nephew Surur ibn Musa'id, who proclaimed himself Emir of Mecca. In the following years there occurred 15 clashes between the two factions, culminating in a final engagement in Jumada al-Thani 1193 AH (June/July 1779) when Ahmad was captured. Surur imprisoned his uncle first at Yanbu and then at Jeddah, where he died on 20 Rabi al-Thani 1195 AH (c. 15 April 1781).

== Notes ==
Ahmad ibn Sa'id ibn Sa'd ibn Zayd House of Zayd; Branch of the House of Qatadah
Regnal titles
Preceded by Abd Allah ibn Sa'id	Sharif and Emir of Mecca; May–July 1770	Succeeded by Abd Allah ibn Husayn
Preceded by Abd Allah ibn Husayn	Sharif and Emir of Mecca; October 1770 – 1773	Succeeded by Surur ibn Musa'id
