= Sharif of Mecca =

Leader of the Sharifate of Mecca

Family tree of the early sharifian dynasties of Mecca. Sulaymanids Hashimids Ja'farids Bani Qatada

The Sharif of Mecca (Arabic: شريف مكة, romanised: Sharīf Makkah) was the title of the leader of the Sharifate of Mecca, traditional steward of the Islamic holy cities of Mecca and Medina. The term sharif is Arabic for "noble", "highborn", and is used to describe the descendants of Hashim ibn Abd Manaf.

The Sharif was charged with protecting the cities and their environs and ensuring the safety of pilgrims performing the Hajj. The title is sometimes spelled Sheriff or Sherif, with the latter variant used, for example, by T. E. Lawrence in Seven Pillars of Wisdom.

The office of the Sharif of Mecca dates back to the late Abbasid era. Until 1200, the Sharifate was held by a member of the Hashim clan, not to be confused with the larger clan of Banu Hashim from which all Sharifs claim descent. Descendants of the Banu Hashim continued to hold the position until the 20th century on behalf of various Muslim powers including the Ayyubids and the Mamluks. In 1517, the Sharif acknowledged the supremacy of the Ottoman Caliph, but maintained a great degree of local autonomy. During the Ottoman era, the Sharifate expanded its authority northwards to include Medina, hitherto a sharifate of its own, and southwards to the frontiers of 'Asir, and regularly raided Nejd.

The Sharifate came to an end shortly after the reign of Hussein bin Ali, who ruled from 1908, who rebelled against the Ottoman rule during the Arab Revolt of 1916. After the defeat of the Ottoman Empire in 1918 and its subsequent dissolution in 1922, Hussein formed the independent Kingdom of Hejaz and then declared himself Caliph. The British granted control over the newly formed states of Iraq and Transjordan to his sons Faisal and Abdullah. In 1924, however, in the face of increasing attacks by Ibn Saud, Hussein abdicated his political titles to his eldest son, Ali bin Hussein, who was to become the last Grand Sharif. At the end of 1925, Ibn Saud conquered the Hejaz and expelled the Hashemites. The House of Saud has ruled Mecca and Medina and overseen the Hajj (annual pilgrimage to Mecca) since that time.

== List of Sharifs of Mecca (967–1925) ==
=== During the Fatimid dynasty (967–1101) ===
Emir	Reign	Notes
Ja'farid dynasty
Ja'far ibn Muhammad al-Hasani	967–980	
Isa ibn Ja'far	980–994	
Abu'l-Futuh al-Hasan ibn Ja'far	994–1012	Briefly anti-Caliph in 1012
Abu Tayeb Daoud bin Abdul Rahman bin Abi Al-Fatik	1012–1039	
Shukr ibn Abi'l-Futuh	1039–1061	Died childless, end of the Ja'farid dynasty
Hawashim
Abu Hashim Muhammad ibn Ja'far	1063–1094	Changed allegiances from the Fatimid to the Abbasid Caliphate in 1071 and back in 1075.
Ibn Abu'l-Hashim al-Thalab	1094–1101	

=== During the Ayyubid Empire (1201–1254) ===
Emir	Reign Bani Qatada	Notes
Qatada ibn Idris al-Hasani al-Alawi	1201–1220	Killed at age 90 by his son; founder of the Banu Qatada, the dynasty which ruled Mecca until 1925.
Hasan ibn Qatada al-Hasani al-Alawi	1220–1241	Al-Zahir Baibers ruler of Egypt sends a prince to collect Zakat from the area including the surrounding bedouins
Al-Hassan abul-Saad	1241–1254	

=== 1250–1301 ===
Emir	Reign AH	Reign CE	Notes	References
Abu Sa'd Hasan ibn Ali ibn Qatadah	647–651	1250–1253	Reigned until his death. Killed by Jammaz ibn Hasan.	
Abu Numayy Muhammad ibn Abi Sa'd	?–651	?–1253	Co-reigned with his father. Named co-ruler after he defended Mecca from capture by Rajih ibn Qatadah and his Banu Husayn allies.	
Jammaz ibn Hasan ibn Qatadah	651 – Hij 651	1253 – Feb 1254	Captured Mecca with an army provided by al-Nasir Yusuf, the Ayyubid ruler of Syria, to whom he had promised the khutbah. However, he reneged and continued the khutbah in the name of al-Muzaffar Yusuf, the Rasulid sultan of Yemen. Deposed by Rajih ibn Qatadah.	
Rajih ibn Qatadah	Hij 651 – Rb1 652	Feb 1254 – Apr/May 1254	Deposed by his son Ghanim.	
Ghanim ibn Rajih	Rb1 652 – Shw 652	Apr/May 1254 – Nov/Dec 1254	Deposed by Abu Numayy and Idris.	
Abu Numayy Muhammad ibn Abi Sa'd	Shw 652 – Qid 652	Nov/Dec 1254 – Jan 1255	Co-rulers. Khutbah in the name of al-Ashraf Musa, the titular Ayyubid sultan of Egypt, and his atabeg al-Mu'izz Aybak. Deposed by the Yemeni emir Ibn Birtas.	
Idris ibn Qatadah	Shw 652 – Qid 652	Nov/Dec 1254 – Jan 1255	Co-rulers. Khutbah in the name of al-Ashraf Musa, the titular Ayyubid sultan of Egypt, and his atabeg al-Mu'izz Aybak. Deposed by the Yemeni emir Ibn Birtas.	
Rasulid occupation				
Husayn ibn Ali ibn Birtas; Mubariz al-Din	Qid 652 – Muh 653	Jan 1255 – Mar 1255	Yemeni emir. Reigned on behalf of the Rasulid sultan al-Muzaffar Yusuf.	
Idris ibn Qatadah	Muh 653 – 654	Mar 1255 – 1256	Co-reigned with his nephew. Deposed in absentia by Abu Numayy when he left Mecca to visit his brother Rajih ibn Qatadah.	
Abu Numayy Muhammad ibn Abi Sa'd	Muh 653 – 656	Mar 1255 –1258	Co-reigned with his uncle for most of his reign.	
Idris ibn Qatadah	654–656	1256–1258	Restored as co-ruler.	
Sons of Hasan ibn Qatadah	656	1258	Took over Mecca while Abu Numayy was absent. Imprisoned Idris and held the city for six days, then withdrew when Abu Numayy returned.	
Idris ibn Qatadah	656–667	1258 – 1268/1269	Co-reigned with his nephew. Deposed for his pro-Rasulid inclinations when Abu Numayy sought the favour of the Egyptian Mamluks.	
Abu Numayy Muhammad ibn Abi Sa'd; Najm al-Din	656 – Rb1 669	1258 – Oct/Nov 1270	Co-reigned with his uncle for most of his reign. In 667 AH he instituted the khutbah in the name of the Mamluk sultan al-Zahir Baybars. Deposed by Idris.	
Idris ibn Qatadah; Baha’ al-Din	667 – Rb2/Jm1 669	1268/1269 – Nov/Dec 1270	Restored as co-ruler and pledged obedience to the Mamluk sultan. Co-reigned with his nephew until Rabi I 669 AH, then reigned independently for 40 days. Beheaded by Abu Numayy on the battlefield at Khulays.	
Abu Numayy Muhammad ibn Abi Sa'd; Najm al-Din	Rb2/Jm1 669 – Saf 670	Nov/Dec 1270 – Sep/Oct 1271	Deposed by Jammaz ibn Shihah and Ghanim ibn Idris.	
Husaynid occupation
Jammaz ibn Shihah ‘Izz al-Din	Saf 670 – Rb2 670	Oct 1271 – Dec 1271	Co-rulers. Held Mecca for 40 days. Deposed by Abu Numayy.	
Ghanim ibn Idris ibn Hasan ibn Qatadah	Saf 670 – Rb2 670	Oct 1271 – Dec 1271	Co-rulers. Held Mecca for 40 days. Deposed by Abu Numayy.	
Abu Numayy Muhammad ibn Abi Sa'd; Najm al-Din	Rb2 670 – 687	Dec 1271 – 1288/1289	Deposed by Jammaz ibn Shihah.	
Husaynid occupation
Jammaz ibn Shihah ‘Izz al-Din	687	1288/1289	Emir of Medina. Captured Mecca with an army provided by the Mamluk sultan al-Mansur Qalawun, but afterwards struck coins and had the khutbah pronounced in his own name. Returned to Medina after he was poisoned.	
Abu Numayy Muhammad ibn Abi Sa'd; Najm al-Din	687 – Saf 701	1288/1289 – Oct 1301	Reigned until his death.	
Humaydah ibn Abi Numayy; Izz al-Din	Saf 701 – Hij 701	Oct 1301 – Aug 1302		
Rumaythah ibn Abi Numayy; Asad al-Din	Saf 701 – Hij 701	Oct 1301 – Aug 1302		
Abu al-Ghayth ibn Abi Numayy; Imad al-Din	Hij 701 – Hij 704	Aug 1302 – Jul 1305		
Utayfah ibn Abi Numayy; Sayf al-Din	Hij 701 – Hij 704	Aug 1302 – Jul 1305		
Humaydah ibn Abi Numayy; Izz al-Din	Hij 704 – c. Hij 713	Jul 1305 – c. Mar 1314		
Rumaythah ibn Abi Numayy; Asad al-Din	Hij 704 – c. Hij 713	Jul 1305 – c. Mar 1314		
Abu al-Ghayth ibn Abi Numayy; Imad al-Din	c. Hij 713 – c. Saf 714	c. Mar 1314 – c. Jun 1314		
Humaydah ibn Abi Numayy; Izz al-Din	c. Saf 714 – Ram 715	c. Mar 1314 – Dec 1315		
Rumaythah ibn Abi Numayy; Asad al-Din	Ram 715 – c. Muh 718	Dec 1315 – c. Mar 1318		
Humaydah ibn Abi Numayy; Izz al-Din	c. Muh 718 – c. Rb2 718	c. Mar 1318 – c. Jun 1318		
Rumaythah ibn Abi Numayy; Asad al-Din	c. Rb2 718 – Hij 718	c. Jun 1318 – Feb 1319		
Utayfah ibn Abi Numayy; Sayf al-Din	Muh 719 – c. Rb1 731	Mar 1319 – c. Jan 1331		
Rumaythah ibn Abi Numayy; Asad al-Din	Qid 720 – c. Rb1 731	Dec 1320 – c. Jan 1331		
Egyptian occupation
Rumaythah ibn Abi Numayy; Asad al-Din	Jm1 731 – 744	Feb 1331 – 1343/1344		
Utayfah ibn Abi Numayy; Sayf al-Din	734 – Hij 734	1333/1334 – Aug 1334		
Utayfah ibn Abi Numayy; Sayf al-Din	Hij 735 – c. Shw 737	Jul 1335 – c. May 1337		
Thaqabah ibn Rumaythah; Asad al-Din	744 – Qid 744	1343/1344 – Mar/Apr 1344		
Ajlan ibn Rumaythah; Izz al-Din	744 – Qid 744	1343/1344 – Mar/Apr 1344		
Rumaythah ibn Abi Numayy; Asad al-Din	Qid 744 – Jm2 746	Mar/Apr 1344 – Oct 1345		

=== During the Mamluk Empire (1254–1517) ===
Flag of Mamluk Hejaz

Emir	Reign	Notes
Muhammed abul-Nubaj	1254–1301	First Mamluk Sharif after the fall of Ayyubid Empire
Rumaitha Abul-Rada	1301–1346	
Ajlan Abul-Sarjah	1346–1375	
Ali bin Ajlan	1375–1394	
Hasan ibn Ajlan	1394–1425	
Barakat ibn Hasan	1425–1455	
Malik ul-Adil ibn Muhammad ibn Barakat	1455–1473	
Barakat II bin Muhammed	1473–1525	Built the first Walls of Jeddah by order of Al-Ashraf Qansuh al-Ghawri

=== During the Ottoman Empire (1517–1917) ===
Emir	Reign	Notes
Barakat II bin Muhammed	1473–1525	Co-reigned with his son Abu Numayy II for the last thirteen years of his rule; first Ottoman Sharif; Hejaz became an Ottoman state after the fall of Cairo to Sultan Selim I.
Abu Numayy II bin Barakat	1512–1584	Co-reigned with his father Barakat II for the first thirteen years of his rule, and with his son Hassan for the last thirty-one years of his rule; rebuilt the walls of Jeddah in 1525 following the victory over the Portuguese in the Red Sea.
Hassan bin Abu Numayy II	1553–1601	Co-reigned with his father for the first thirty-one years of his rule.
Abd al-Muttalib bin Hassan	1601	Reigned for less than a year.
Abu Talib bin Hassan	1601–1603	Co-reigned with his brother Idris.
Idris bin Hassan	1601–1620	Co-reigned with his brother Abu Talib for the first two years of his rule, then with his brother Fuhaid for six years and nephew Muhsin for sixteen.
Fuhaid bin Hassan	1604–1610	Co-reigned with his brother Idris and his son Muhsin.
Muhsin bin Fuhaid	1604–1628	Co-reigned with his father for the first six years of his rule, and with his uncle Idris for the first sixteen.
Ahmed bin Abd al-Muttalib	1628–1629	
Masoud bin Idris	1629–1630	
Abdullah I bin Hassan	1630–1631	
Muhammed bin Abdullah	1631–1632	Co-reigned with his first cousin once removed, Zeid.
Zeid bin Muhsin	1631–1632	First reign, co-reigned with his first cousin once removed, Muhammed.
Namy bin Abd al-Muttalib	1632	Briefly co-reigned with his cousin Abd al-Aziz.
Abd al-Aziz bin Idris	1632	Briefly co-reigned with his cousin Namy.
Zeid bin Muhsin	1632–1666	Second reign.
Saad bin Zeid	1666–1672	First reign, co-reigned with his brother Ahmed for the last three years of his rule.
Ahmed bin Zeid	1669–1672	First reign, co-reigned with his brother Saad.
Barakat bin Muhammed bin Ibrahim bin Barakat bin Abu Numayy	1672–1682	
Said bin Barakat	1682–1683	
Ahmed bin Zeid	1672–1688	
Ahmed bin Ghalib bin Muhammed bin Musaid bin Masoud bin Hasan	1688–1690	
Muhsin bin Hussein	1690–1691	
Said bin Saad	1691	Ceded reign to his father Saad.
Saad bin Zeid	1691–1696	Second reign.
Abdullah II bin Hashim	1696	Co-reigned with Said.
Saad bin Zeid	1694–1702	Third reign.
Abdulkarim bin Muhammed	1704–1705	First reign.
Saad bin Zeid	1705	Fourth reign, lasted eighteen days.
Said bin Saad	1705	
Abdulkarim bin Muhammed	1705–1711	Second reign.
Said bin Saad	1711–1717	Second reign.
Abdullah III bin Said	1717–1718	First reign.
Ali bin Said	1718	
Yahya bin Barakat	1718–1720	
Mubarak bin Ahmad	1720–1723	
Yahya bin Barakat	1723–1725	
Abdullah III bin Said	1725–1731	Second reign.
Muhammed bin Abdullah	1731–1733	Co-reigned with his uncle Masoud for the last year of his rule.
Masoud bin Said	1732–1752	Briefly co-reigned with his nephew Muhammed for the first year of his rule.
Musaid bin Said	1752–1759	First reign.
Jafar bin Said	1759–1760	
Musaid bin Said	1760–1770	Second reign.
Abdullah IV bin Hussein bin Barakat	1770–1771	
Ahmed bin Said	1771–1773	
Surur bin Musaid	1773–1788	
Abd al-Muin bin Musaid	1788	First reign, only lasted a few days.
Ghalib bin Musaid	1788–1813	Co-reigned with his brother Abd al-Muin while Saudis held the city of Mecca.
Abd al-Muin bin Musaid	1796–1813	Second reign, co-reigned with his brother Ghalib.
Yahya bin Surur	1813–1827	
Abd al-Muttalib bin Ghalib	1827	First reign.
Muhammed bin Abd al-Muin bin Awn bin Muhsin bin Abdullah bin al-Hussain bin Abdullah I	1827–1851	First reign, placed in power by Muhammad Ali Pasha.
Abd al-Muttalib bin Ghalib	1851–1856	Second reign.
Muhammed bin Abd al-Muin	1856–1858	Second reign.
Abdullah bin Muhammed	1858–1877	
Hussein bin Muhammed	1877–1880	
Abd al-Muttalib bin Ghalib	1880–1881	Third reign.
Abd al-Ilah bin Muhammed	1881–1882	Was appointed again in 1908 after the deposition of Ali bin Abdullah, however he died before reaching Mecca.
Awn ar-Rafiq bin Muhammed	1882–1905	
Ali bin Abdullah bin Muhammed	1905–1908	
Hussein bin Ali Pasha	1908–1916	Later King Hussein
Ali Haidar Pasha	1916–1917	

=== During the Kingdom of Hejaz (1916–1925) ===
Flag of Kingdom of Hejaz

Portrait	Monarch	Reign	Notes	Prime Minister
	King Hussein bin Ali	1916–1924	Previously Hussein Pasha	Ali bin Hussein (1916–1924)
	King Ali bin Hussein	1924–1925	Conquered by the Nejd on 19 December 1925	Abd Allah Siraj (1924–1925)
	King Ali bin Hussein	1924–1925	Conquered by the Nejd on 19 December 1925	Muhammad at-Tawil (1925)

== Genealogy ==
Banu Hashim

Hashim ibn Abd Manaf
ʿAbd al-Muṭṭalib ibn Hashim
Abī Ṭālib ibn ʿAbd al-Muṭṭalib	Abdullah ibn ʿAbd al-Muṭṭalib
Muḥammad al-Muṣṭafā; The prophet
ʿAlī al-Murtaḍā; Caliph r. 656-661	Fāṭima al-Zahrāʾ bint Muḥammad
Al-Ḥassan al-Mujtabā; Caliph r. 661
Al-Ḥasan al-Mu'thannā
Abdullah al-Kāmīl
Mūsā al-Jawn ibn Abdullah
Abdullah as-Sālīh ibn Mūsā
Sālīh ibn Abdullah	Mūsā II ibn Abdullah	Sulaymanids of Yemen
Muḥammad ash-Shāʿīr	Muḥammad at-Thāʿīr	Dāʿwūd ibn Mūsā II	Sulayman ibn Abdullah
Husayn ibn Muḥammad	Qatādīds of Mecca	Dawud ibn Sulayman
Abu Hashim; Muḥammad ibn Husayn	Abu Ja'far; Muḥammad ibn Husayn	Abdullah ibn Muḥammad	Abu al-Fatik; Abdullah ibn Dawud
Abdullah ibn Muḥammad	Ja'far ibn Muḥammad r. 967-980	Ali ibn Abdullah	Abd al-Rahman ibn Abdullah
Muḥammad ibn Abdullah	Isa ibn Ja'far r. 980-994	Hasan ibn Ja'far r. 994-1012, 1012-1039	Sulayman ibn Ali	Dawud ibn Abd al-Rahman r. 1012
Ja'far ibn Muḥammad	Shukr ibn Hasan r. 1039-1061	Husayn ibn Sulayman	Wahhas ibn Dawud
Muhammad ibn Ja'far r. 1063-1094	Isa ibn Husayn	Hamza ibn Wahhas r. 1061-1063
Qasīm ibn Muhammad r. 1094-1123	ʿAbd Al-Karīm ibn ʿĪssā
Fulayta ibn Qasim r. 1123-1132	Mutā'īn ibn ʿAbd Al-Karīm
Hashim ibn Fulayta r. 1132-1154	Isa ibn Fulayta r. 1160-1174	Idris ibn Mutā'īn
Qasim ibn Hashim r. 1154-1160	Dawud ibn Isa r. 1174-1175, 1176-1189	Mukaththir ibn Isa r. 1175-1176, 1189-1201	Qatādah ibn Idris r. 1201-1220
Mansur ibn Dawud r. 1196-1201	Abu al-Hasan; Ali ibn Qatādah	Hasan ibn Qatādah r. 1220-1222	Rajih ibn Qatādah r. 1232-1241, 1254	Idris ibn Qatādah r. 1254-1270
Hasan ibn Ali r. 1250-1253	Jammaz ibn Hasan r. 1253-1254	Ghanim ibn Rajih r. 1254
Abu Numayy I ibn Hasan r. 1250-1301
Abu al-Ghayth ibn Abi Numayy r. 1302-1305	Rumaytha ibn Abi Numayy r. 1301-1344	Utayfa ibn Abi Numayy r. 1301-1330	Humayda ibn Abi Numayy r. 1301-1318
Thaqaba ibn Rumaytha r. 1344-1361	Sanad ibn Rumaytha r. 1349-1361	Mughamis ibn Rumaytha r. 1347-1349	Ajlan ibn Rumaytha r. 1344-1372	Muhammad ibn Utayfa r. 1359
Ali ibn Ajlan r. 1375-1394	Hasan ibn Ajlan r. 1396-1426	Ahmad ibn Ajlan r. 1361-1386	Muhammad ibn Ajlan r. 1391-1396
Abu al-Qasim ibn Hasan r. 1443-1446	Ali ibn Hasan r. 1441-1443	Ahmad ibn Hasan r. 1408-1416	Barakat I ibn Hasan r. 1425-1455	Rumaytha ibn Muhammad r. 1416-1417
Muhammad ibn Barakat r. 1455-1497
Barakat II ibn Muhammad r. 1497-1525	Ahmad; Jazan ibn Muhammad r. 1503	Hazza ibn Muhammad r. 1501	Qayitbay ibn Muhammad r. 1504-1512
Abu Numayy II ibn Barakat r. 1525-1583
Barakat ibn Abi Numayy	Ahmad ibn Abi Numayy r. 1540-1554	Hasan ibn Abi Numayy r. 1556-1601
Ibrahim ibn Barakat	Musa ibn Barakat	Abu Talib ibn Hasan r. 1601-1603	Idris ibn Hasan r. 1603-1624	Abdullah ibn Hasan r. 1630-1631	Husayn ibn Hasan	Fuhayd ibn Hasan r. 1603-1610	Abd al-Muttalib ibn Hasan	Mas'ud ibn Hasan r. 1629-1630
Muhammad ibn Ibrahim	Hamza ibn Musa	Mas'ud ibn Idris r. 1629-1630	Abd al-Aziz ibn Idris r. 1632	Hammud ibn Abdullah r. 1666	Husayn ibn Abdullah	Muhammad ibn Abdullah r. 1631-1632	Muhsin ibn Husayn r. 1603-1628	Nami ibn Abd al-Muttalib r. 1632	Muhammad ibn Abd al-Muttalib	Musa'id ibn Mas'ud
Barakat ibn Muhammad	Yala ibn Hamza	Abdullah ibn Husayn	Zayd ibn Muhsin r. 1631-1666	Hashim ibn Muhammad	Muhammad ibn Musa'id
Sa'id ibn Barakat r. 1682-1683	Yahya ibn Barakat r. 1722-1723	Muhammad ibn Yala	Muhsin ibn Abdullah	Sa'd ibn Zayd r. 1666-1705	Ahmad ibn Zayd r. 1669-1688	Husayn ibn Hasan	Abdullah ibn Hashim r. 1694	Ghalib ibn Muhammad
Barakat III ibn Yahya r. 1723	Husayn ibn Yahya	Abd al-Qadir ibn Muhammad r. 1704-1705, 1705-1711	Awn ibn Muhsin	Sa'id ibn Sa'd r. 1691-1717	Muhsin ibn Husayn r. 1691-1717	Ahmad ibn Ghalib r. 1688-1690
Abdullah ibn Husayn r. 1770	Abd al-Mu'in ibn Awn	Mas'ud ibn Sa'id r. 1732-1759	Ja'far ibn Sa'id r. 1759-1760	Musa'id ibn Sa'id r. 1752-1759, 1759-1760	Ali ibn Sa'id r. 1718	Ahmad ibn Sa'id r. 1770-1773	Abdullah ibn Sa'id r. 1717-1731
Muhammad ibn Abd al-Mu'in r. 1827-1851, 1856-1858	Ghalib ibn Musa'id r. 1788-1827	Abd al-Mu'in ibn Musa'id r. 1788-1803	Surur ibn Musa'id r. 1773-1788	Muhammad bin Abdullah r. 1731-1734
Husayn bin Muḥammad r. 1877-1880	Abdullah ibn Muḥammad r. 1858-1877	Ali ibn Muḥammad	Awn al-Rafiq ibn Muḥammad r. 1882-1905	Abdullah ibn Muḥammad r. 1882, 1908	Abd al-Muṭṭalib ibn Ghalib r. 1827-1882	Yahya ibn Surur r. 1813-1827
Ali ibn Abdullah r. 1905-1908	Husayn bin Ali r. 1908-1924	Jabir ibn Abd al-Muttalib
Ali ibn Husayn r. 1924-1925	Ali Haydar ibn Jabir r. 1916-1917

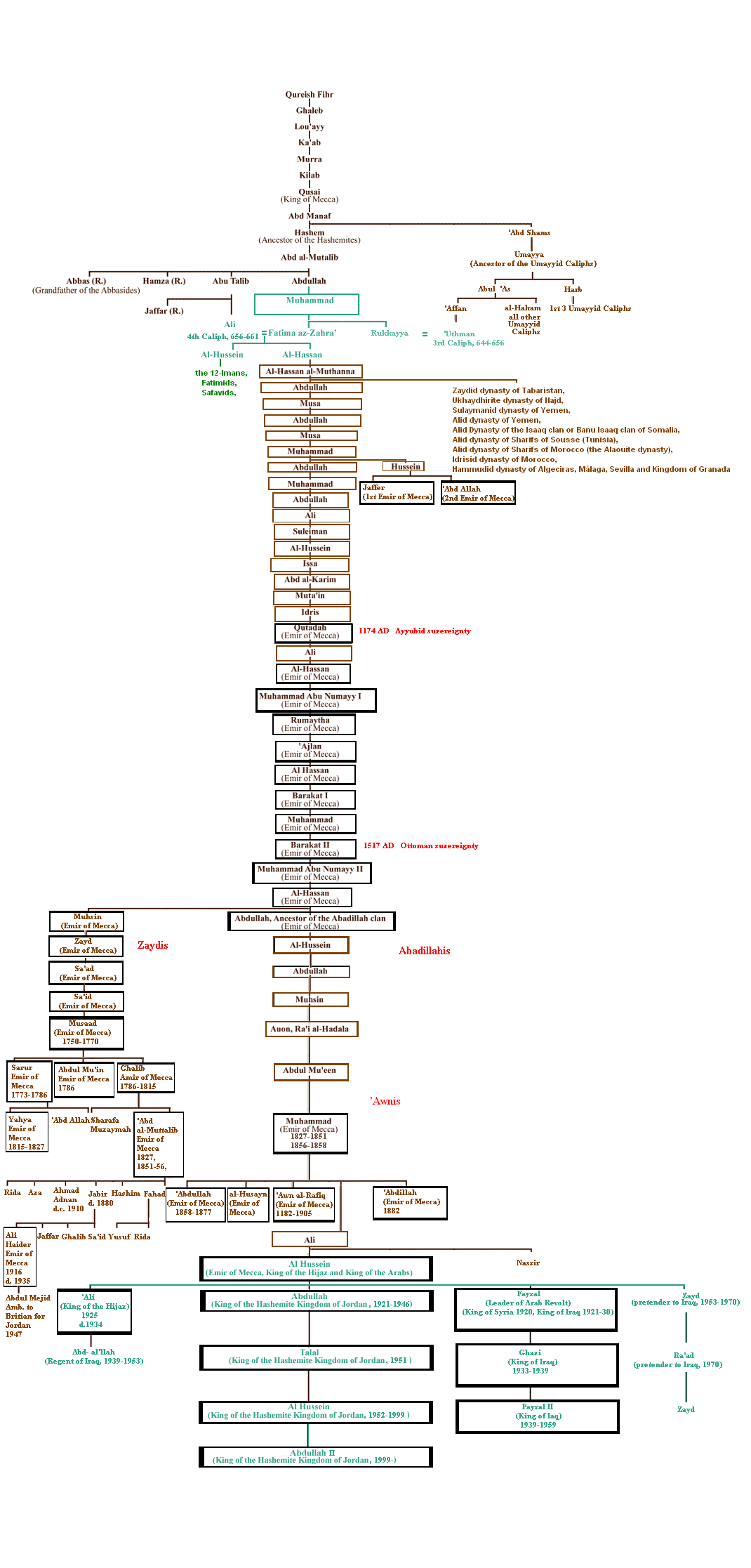
Genealogical tree of the Hashemite family showing their descent from Muhammad.

== See also ==
- Custodian of the Two Holy Mosques
- Hashemite custodianship of Jerusalem holy sites
- Hejaz Vilayet
- Kingdom of Hejaz
- Battle of Mecca (1916)
- Battle of Mecca (1924)
- Siege of Medina
- List of caliphs
- List of Sunni dynasties

== Bibliography ==
- Mortel, Richard T. (1985). "The Genealogy of the Ḥasanid Sharifs of Mecca". Journal of the College of Arts, King Saud University. 12: 221–250.
- Mortel, Richard T. (1987). "Zaydi Shiism and the Hasanid Sharifs of Mecca". International Journal of Middle East Studies. 19 (4): 455–472. doi:10.1017/S0020743800056518. JSTOR 163211. S2CID 161236719.
- Ibn Fahd, ‘Izz al-Din ‘Abd al-‘Azīz ibn ‘Umar (1986–1988) [Composed before 1518]. Shaltūt, Fahīm Muḥammad (ed.). Ghāyat al-marām bi-akhbār salṭanat al-Balad al-Ḥarām غاية المرام بأخبار سلطنة البلد الحرام (in Arabic) (1st ed.). Makkah: Jāmi‘at Umm al-Qurá, Markaz al-Baḥth al-‘Ilmī wa-Iḥyā’ al-Turāth al-Islāmī, Kullīyat al-Sharīʻah wa-al-Dirāsāt al-Islāmīyah.
- Ibn Fahd, Najm al-Din Umar ibn Muḥammad (1983–1984) [Composed before 1481]. Shaltūt, Fahīm Muḥammad (ed.). Itḥāf al-wará bi-akhbār Umm al-Qurá إتحاف الورى بأخبار أم القرى (in Arabic) (1st ed.). Makkah: Jāmi‘at Umm al-Qurá, Markaz al-Baḥth al-‘Ilmī wa-Iḥyā’ al-Turāth al-Islāmī, Kullīyat al-Sharīʻah wa-al-Dirāsāt al-Islāmīyah.
- al-Sinjārī, ‘Alī ibn Tāj al-Dīn ibn Taqī al-Dīn (1998) [Composed 1713]. al-Miṣrī, Jamīl ‘Abd Allāh Muḥammad (ed.). Manā'iḥ al-karam fī akhbār Makkah wa-al-Bayt wa-wulāt al-Ḥaram منائح الكرم في أخبار مكة والبيت وولاة الحرم (in Arabic) (1st ed.). Makkah: Jāmi‘at Umm al-Qurá.
