= Ja'far ibn Sa'id =

Ja'far ibn Sa'id جعفر بن سعيد

Sharif and Emir of Mecca
- Reign: August 1759 – c. 6 September 1759
- Predecessor: Musa'id ibn Sa'id
- Successor: Musa'id ibn Sa'id
- Died: 1764/1765
- House: Banu Hashim; Banu Qatadah; Dhawu Zayd
- Father: Sa'id ibn Sa'd

Ja‘far ibn Sa‘īd ibn Sa‘d (Arabic: جعفر بن سعيد بن سعد; d. 1764/1765) was a sharif of the Zayd clan who served as Sharif and Emir of Mecca in August–September 1759.

In May 1759 Çeteci Abdullah Pasha, Vali of Damascus and Emir of the Syrian Hajj, acquired an imperial firman authorizing him to depose Sharif Musa'id ibn Sa'id and replace him with his brother Ja'far, which he accomplished after the completion of the Hajj rituals in Dhu al-Hijjah 1172 AH (August 1759). After the departure of Çeteci Abdullah and the Hajj caravan from Mecca, Ja'far reached an agreement with Musa'id allowing him to return to the throne. He abdicated on 14 Muharram 1173 (c. 6 September 1759). He later moved to Ta'if, where he busied himself in buying and selling orchards and gardens. He remained on good terms with his brother until his death in 1178 AH (1764/1765).

== Notes ==
Ja'far ibn Sa'id ibn Sa'd ibn Zayd House of Zayd; Branch of the House of Qatadah
Regnal titles
Preceded by Musa'id ibn Sa'id	Sharif and Emir of Mecca; August–September 1759	Succeeded by Musa'id ibn Sa'id
