= Yahya ibn Surur =

Yahya ibn Surur يحيى بن سرور

Sharif and Emir of Mecca
- Reign: November 1813 – May/June 1827
- Predecessor: Ghalib ibn Musa'id
- Successor: Abd al-Muttalib ibn Ghalib
- Died: c. 1838; Egypt Eyalet, Ottoman Empire
- House: Banu Hashim; Banu Qatadah; Dhawu Zayd
- Father: Surur ibn Musa'id

Yahya ibn Surur ibn Musa‘id (Arabic: يحيى بن سرور بن مساعد, romanized: Yaḥyá ibn Surūr ibn Musā‘id; died c. 1838) was a sharif of the Zayd clan who served as Sharif and Emir of Mecca from 1813 to 1827.

Muhammad Ali Pasha appointed Yahya to replace his uncle Sharif Ghalib ibn Musa'id in late Dhi al-Qi'dah 1228 AH (November 1813). The imperial firman (proclamation) and khil'ah (robe of honor) were sent from Istanbul, dated Rabi al-Awwal 1229 AH (February/March 1814).

He was deposed by Muhammad Ali in Dhi al-Qi'dah 1242 AH (May/June 1827). He settled in Cairo with his family and died in 1254 AH (1838/1839).

== Notes ==
Yahya ibn Surur ibn Musa‘id ibn Sa‘id ibn Sa‘d ibn Zayd House of Zayd; Branch of the House of Qatadah Died: c. 1838
Regnal titles
Preceded by Ghalib ibn Musa'id	Sharif and Emir of Mecca; 1813–1827	Succeeded by Abd al-Muttalib ibn Ghalib
