= Abd Allah Pasha ibn Muhammad =

19th century sharif and emir

Sharif Abd Allah Pasha ibn Muhammad (Arabic: الشريف عبد الله باشا بن محمد al-Sharīf ‘Abd Allāh Bāshā ibn Muḥammad; Ottoman Turkish: شريف عبد الله پاشا بن محمد Şerif Abdullah Paşa bin Muhammed; d. 1877) was a sharif of the Awn clan who served as Emir and Sharif of Mecca from 1858 to 1877.

Raoul du Bisson was traveling down the Red Sea in the 1860s when he saw the chief black eunuch of the Sharif of Mecca being brought to Constantinople for trial for impregnating a Circassian concubine of the Sharif and having sex with his entire harem of Circassian and Georgian women. The chief black eunuch was not castrated correctly so he was still able to impregnate and the women were drowned as punishment. (Note: Abd Allah Pasha ibn Muhammad was the Sharif of Mecca during Raoul du Bisson's time in the Red Sea in 1863-5) 12 Georgian women were shipped to replace the drowned concubines.
