= Abu Tayeb Daoud bin Abdul Rahman =

- Reign: 1012 – 1039
- Predecessor: Shukr
- Successor: Muhammad
- Born: Mecca, Hijaz
- Died: 1041; Mecca, Hijaz
Names
- Abu Tayeb Daoud bin Abdul Rahman
- Tribe: Quraysh (Banu Hashim)
- Religion: Islam

Sharif Abu Tayeb Daoud bin Abdul Rahman bin Abi Al-Fatik Abdullah bin Daoud bin Suleiman bin Abdullah who took command of Mecca in 1012 AD was the first Banu Hashim to rule Mecca. He continued to lead the city through 1039. He founded the Mikhlaf al-Sulaymani, and ruled the surrounding areas. He yielded the rule of Hijaz to his brother Sharif Mohammed bin Abdul Rahman bin Abi Al-Fatak. His descendants today are Al-Fakher, Abu Omreen, Al-Mahdi and Al-Hamzah.

== Descendants ==
- Abu Tayeb Daoud bin Abdul Rahman bin Abi Al-Fatik
- Abdullah bin Dawood bin Suleiman bin Abdullah
- Al-Reza bin Musa bin Abdullah Al-Kamil bin Al-Hassan
- Muthanna bin Hassan Al-Sabt bin Ali ibn Abi Talib.

== Ruling on Mecca and Hijaz ==
Sharif Abu Tayeb Dawood bin Abdul Rahman took the command of Mecca in 1012. This was the first of the rule of the al'ashraf alsulimaniuwn of Bani Hashim, which ruled Mecca and Hijaz in 1012 AD. He continued to lead into 1039 and was then succeeded by his brother, Sharif Mohammed bin Abdul Rahman ibn Abi al-Fatik.
