= Abd Allah ibn Sa'id =

Abd Allah ibn Sa'id عبد الله بن سعيد

Sharif and Emir of Mecca
- Reign: May 1770
- Predecessor: Musa'id ibn Sa'id
- Successor: Ahmad ibn Sa'id
- Died: c. 1776
- House: Banu Hashim; Banu Qatadah; Dhawu Zayd
- Father: Sa'id ibn Sa'd

‘Abd Allāh ibn Sa‘īd ibn Sa‘d (Arabic: عبد الله بن سعيد بن سعد; d. c. 1776) was a sharif of the Zayd clan who was briefly Sharif and Emir of Mecca in May 1770.

His brother Sharif Musa'id gave bay'ah (allegiance) to him before his death as his chosen successor. He assumed the Emirate after Musa'id's death on 27 Muharram 1184 AH (c. 23 May 1770) and received his investiture from the Qadi of Mecca. However his brother Sharif Ahmad, desiring the Emirate for himself, deposed Abd Allah and appointed himself as Emir. Abd Allah died six years later.

== Notes ==
Abd Allah ibn Sa'id ibn Sa'd ibn Zayd House of Zayd; Branch of the House of Qatadah
Regnal titles
Preceded by Musa'id ibn Sa'id	Sharif and Emir of Mecca; May 1770	Succeeded by Ahmad ibn Sa'id
