= Surur ibn Musa'id =

Surur ibn Musa'id سرور بن مساعد

Sharif and Emir of Mecca
- Reign: 6 February 1773 – c. 27 January 1788
- Predecessor: Ahmad ibn Sa'id
- Successor: Abd al-Mu'in ibn Musa'id
- Born: c. 1754
- Died: c. 27 January 1788; Mecca, Ottoman Empire
- Burial: Jannat al-Mu'alla
- Spouse: Princess Lalla Lubabah bint Mohammed al-Alaoui (m. 1768)
- House: Banu Hashim; Banu Qatadah; Dhawu Zayd
- Father: Musa'id ibn Sa'id

Surūr ibn Musā‘id ibn Sa‘īd (Arabic: سرور بن مساعد بن سعيد, c. 1754 – c. 27 January 1788) was a sharif of the Zayd clan who served as Sharif and Emir of Mecca from 1773 to 1788.

On 6 February 1773 Sharif Surur entered Mecca and proclaimed himself Emir in opposition to his uncle Sharif Ahmad ibn Sa'id.

He died on 18 Rabi al-Thani 1202 AH (c. 27 January 1788) and was buried in Jannat al-Mu'alla, in the mausoleum of Khadijah bint Khuwaylid.

== Marriage and issue ==
In 1768, he wedded Princess Lalla Lubabah of Morocco, daughter of Sultan Sidi Mohammed III and of his wife Lalla Fatima bint Suleiman al-Alaoui.

His known children were:

- Abd Allah
- Yahya
- Sa'id
- Hasan
- Ahmad
- Muhammad

Surur ibn Musa'id ibn Sa'id ibn Sa'd ibn Zayd 'House of Zayd; Branch of the House of Qatadah'
Regnal titles
Preceded by Ahmad ibn Sa'id	Sharif and Emir of Mecca; 1773–1788	Succeeded by Abd al-Mu'in ibn Musa'id
