= Abu Omreen =

Abu Omreen آل ابوعمرين
- Arab tribe
- Descended from: Abu Tayeb Daoud bin Abdul Rahman
- Parent tribe: Banu Hashim, Sulaymanids
- Religion: Islam

ِAbu Omreen is a family of Banu Hashim from the Quraish tribe. They are a branch of the Sulaymanids of the Banu Hashim, who ruled Mecca in the fifth century AH. Today, they reside in Mecca, Medina, Tihamah Al Hijaz, Syria, Jordan, and Egypt.

== Descent ==
It is attributed to the percentage of all Abu Omreen to Fakhr bin Mahdi bin Mohammed bin Hassan bin Ezz al-Din bin Ibrahim bin Mohammed bin Yahya bin Fakhir bin Mohammed bin Qasim bin Mahdi bin Qasim bin Barka bin Qasim bin Mohammed bin Hamza bin Qasim bin (Abu Omreen) Abdullah bin Abu Tayeb Daoud bin Abdul Rahman ibn Abi al-Fatik Abdullah Bin Dawood bin Sulaiman bin Abdullah Al-Reza bin Musa Al-Jun ibn Abdullah Al-Mahdah bin Al-Hassan Al-Muthanna bin Al-Hasan Al-Sabt Ibn Al-Mu'minin Al-Mu'minin Ali Bin Abi Talib.

== Ruling on Mecca and Hijaz ==
They ruled Mecca at the beginning of the fifth century AH, and took the Emirate of Mecca grandfather Sharif Abu Tayeb Daoud bin Abdul Rahman bin Abi Fatik Abdullah ibn Dawood bin Suleiman and the year 403 AH / 1012 AD and then Hamza bin Whhas bin Abu Tayeb Daoud bin Abdul Rahman bin Abi Fatik Abdul Allah, the year 451 AH. Where their grandfather ruled ِabu omreen Abdullah bin Abu Tayeb Daoud bin Abdul Rahman bin Abi Fatik, the year 1050 AD.

== Most prominent figures ==
=== Hamza bin Wahhas ===
Sharif Hamza bin Wahhas ruler and Sharif Makkah Emirate in 451 AH and continued the rule to 454 AH and specifically on the sixth of the month of Dhu al-Hijjah where he was isolated by the owner of Yemen Ali bin Mohammed al-Sulayhi and thus Sharif Hamza bin Wahas the last rulers of the supervision of the Sulaymanids on Mecca Al-Mukarramah and Hijaz and the beginning of the rule of supervisors Hawashim princes (third class) in 455 AH by Sharif Mohammed bin Jaafar Abi Hashim.

=== Sharif Fakhir bin Mohammed bin Qasim Abu Omreen ===
Sharif Fakhir bin Mohammed bin Qasim Abu Omreen He was appointed among the leaders who fought the Portuguese colonization in (948 AH - 1541 AD) under the leadership of Sharif Abu Numayy II when they took over the Citadel of Jeddah, where he responded to Abu Numayy II call in Mecca for Jihad against colonialism. He was appointed Emir of Tihama al-Hijaz (974 AH – 1566 AD) under the reign of Sharif Muhammad Abu Numayy II and did not last long for his death.

=== Sharif Mohammed bin Othman bin Fakher Abu Omreen ===
Sharif Mohammed bin Othman bin Fakher Abu Omreen is Hashemi of the Abu omreen Family, which is attributed to the Hashemi of the Sulaymanids was one of the senior supervisors in the Emirate of Hussein bin Ali, Sharif of Mecca, and their influence had survived the Al-Khurma dispute, which was led by Prince Abdullah I on May 25, 1919, AD.
