= Musa'id ibn Sa'id =

Musa'id ibn Sa'id مساعد بن سعيد

Sharif and Emir of Mecca
- Reign: February 1752 – August 1759
- Predecessor: Mas'ud ibn Sa'id
- Successor: Ja'far ibn Sa'id
- Reign: c. 6 September 1759 – 23 May 1770
- Predecessor: Ja'far ibn Sa'id
- Successor: Abd Allah ibn Sa'id
- Died: 23 May 1770; Mecca, Ottoman Empire
- Issue: Surur, Sharif of Mecca; Ghalib, Sharif of Mecca; Abd al-Mu'in, Sharif of Mecca
- House: Banu Hashim; Banu Qatadah; Dhawu Zayd
- Father: Sa'id, Sharif of Mecca

Musā‘id ibn Sa‘īd ibn Sa‘d (Arabic: مساعد بن سعيد بن سعد; d. 23 May 1770) was a sharif of the Zayd clan who served as Sharif and Emir of Mecca from 1752 to 1770.

Musa'id assumed the Sharifate in Rabi al-Thani 1165 AH (February 1752) after the death of his brother Mas'ud. He was elected by agreement of the Vali of Jeddah, the Qadi of Mecca, and a majority of the ashraf. He received the imperial firman from Istanbul in Jumada al-Thani 1165 AH (April/May 1752). Musa'id's rule was initially opposed by his nephew Sharif Muhammad ibn Abd Allah, formerly Sharif of Mecca, who was supported by the rival Barakat clan and some of the Bedouin tribes. Muhammad captured Ta'if in May and twice attempted to take Mecca before the two sides reconciled in late June.

In 1171 AH (1758) Sayyid Abd Allah al-Fa'ar, a former ally, attempted to depose Musa'id with support from the Egyptian and Syrian Emirs of the Hajj, Keşkeş Hüseyin Bey and Çeteci Abdullah Pasha. On 21 Dhu al-Hijjah (c. 26 August 1758) soldiers took control of the Masjid al-Haram and proclaimed Sharif Mubarak ibn Muhammad ibn Abd Allah ibn Sa'id as Emir. The consequent battle within Mecca ended the next day with Musa'id victorious. The following year Çeteci Abdullah returned as Emir of the Syrian Hajj. This time aided by an official firman, he deposed Musa'id and replaced him with his brother Ja'far ibn Sa'id in August 1759. After the departure of Çeteci Abdullah and the Hajj caravan, Ja'far abdicated to his brother on 14 Muharram 1173 AH (c. 6 September 1759). Musa'id sent a complaint to Sultan Mustafa III against Çeteci Abdullah, to which he attached the testimonies of Mecca's four Muftis. The charges against Musa'id were determined to be unfounded and, as a result, Çeteci Abdullah was removed from his post as Vali of Damascus and Emir of the Hajj, and Musa'id was sent a renewed proclamation and khil'ah in late Jumada al-Thani 1173 AH (February 1760).

In 1182 AH (1768/1769) Sharif Abd Allah ibn Husayn ibn Yahya of the Barakat clan failed to capture Jeddah. He then formed an alliance with Ali Bey al-Kabir of Egypt, who in 1183 AH (1770) sent Muhammad Bey Abu al-Dhahab as Emir of the Hajj with the intention of deposing Sharif Musa'id. However, after the completion of the Hajj rites, Musa'id and Uthman Pasha al-Sadiq, Emir of the Syrian Hajj, compelled Abu al-Dhahab and his army to leave Mecca before they could complete their objective. Having lost his ally, Abd Allah ibn Husayn mounted his own offensive against Musa'id, only to be defeated in Muharram 1184 AH, after which he returned to Egypt.

Sharif Musa'id died on Wednesday, 27 Muharram 1184 AH (23 May 1770). Before his death he gave allegiance to his brother Abd Allah ibn Sa'id as his successor.

== Issue ==
Sons:

- Surur, Sharif of Mecca
- Mas'ud
- Abd al-Aziz
- Ghalib, Sharif of Mecca
- Abd al-Mu'in, Sharif of Mecca
- Muhammad
- Lu'ayy

== Notes ==
Musa'id ibn Sa'id ibn Sa'd ibn Zayd House of Zayd; Branch of the House of Qatadah
Regnal titles
Preceded by Mas'ud ibn Sa'id	Sharif and Emir of Mecca; 1752 – August 1759	Succeeded by Ja'far ibn Sa'id
Preceded by Ja'far ibn Sa'id	Sharif and Emir of Mecca; September 1759 – 1770	Succeeded by Abd Allah ibn Sa'id
