= Raoul du Bisson =

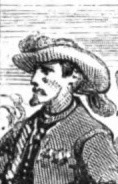
- Born: 11 January 1812
- Died: 27 February 1890 (aged 78)
- Resting place: Montmartre Cemetery

Count Raoul du Bisson (11 January 1812 – 27 February 1890) was a French aristocrat, adventurer and agent provocateur. He belonged to a Norman family ennobled by Louis XVIII and was a relative of Henri Conneau, a personal friend and physician of Napoleon III.

In 1863, Du Bisson recruited a band of directionless Europeans in the cafés of Egypt and marched them down to Khartoum, where he pronounced it his intention to establish a colony for the production of cotton. Crossing into the Sudan, his party had been inspected by Egyptian customs and was found to be in possession of numerous arms and even cannon. This has led to the supposition that he may have been acting on the orders of Khedive İsmail Paşa, who was planning an invasion of Ethiopia. After inquiries with the French authorities regarding his credentials, İsmail abandoned his plans and Du Bisson was on his own.

In Khartoum, Du Bisson made numerous demands on the governor-general, Musa Paşa Hamdi, who eventually declared him persona non grata. In early 1864 he led his band to Kassala, thence eastward to Kufit. There he claimed that he had the support of the French government to punish the Ethiopian emperor Tewodros II for having declared the French vice-consul Guillaume Le Jean persona non grata in Ethiopia. The British formally protested Du Bisson's presence, but the French government denied any involvement. Nevertheless, the presence of a group of sixty armed Europeans on his border—and who had only gotten there with the connivance of the khedive and the governor-general—led Tewodros to suspect a French–Turkish–Egyptian alliance against him.

Du Bisson also intrigued with the local Beja tribesmen and the Egyptian government eventually ordered him to leave. His men left via Kassala and Sawakin, but not before helping put down the mutiny of the 4th Regiment at Kassala. He published an account of his Sudan adventure in 1868.

After the Sudan, Du Bisson returned to France. There are contradictory reports of his ultimate fate. According to some, he was killed in the fighting during the siege of Paris by the Germans in 1870. According to others, he got involved in the Paris Commune in 1871 and was forced into exile, where he died. According to yet others, he was the leader of the republican Central Committee of the Twenty Arrondissements and boastfully claimed to have been a Carlist in Spain, a Legitimist under the Second Empire, and a general of King Ferdinand II of the Two Sicilies.

== Works by Du Bisson ==
- Du Bisson, Raoul. Les Femmes, les eunuques et les guerriers du Soudan [The Women, Eunuchs and Warriors of the Sudan]. Paris: H. Dufton, 1868.
