= Iraq–European Union relations =

European Union–Iraq relations
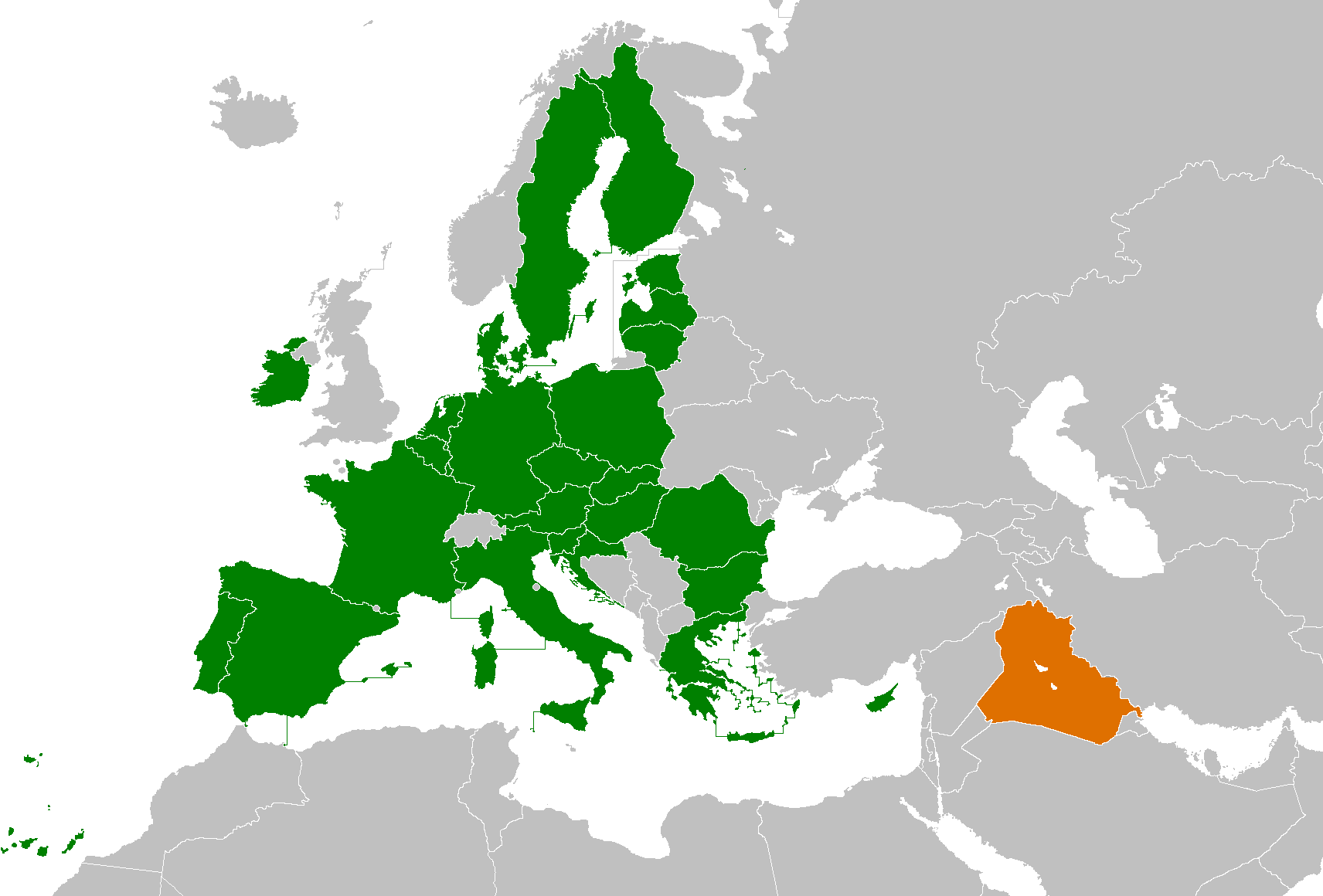
- European Union: Iraq

Iraq – European Union (EU) relations are the international relations between Iraq and the European Union. Relations have been strained from the early 1990s but are now gradually progressing. From Brussels, Iraq has mostly been considered as falling under the U.S. area of responsibilities, independently from the close economic ties between certain European states and Saddam Hussein’s Iraq prior to the international sanctions regime, or the participation of five European countries in the U.S.-led invasion and occupation of the country. Should Turkey, which is a candidate for EU membership, accede to the EU, Iraq will be a border neighbor with the European Union.

== Background ==
Differences in the European and U.S. approaches to the issue of Iraq began to emerge in the 1990s. This period, following the expulsion of Iraq from Kuwait in 1991, was characterized by a policy of containment. Alongside this policy, however, the United States became progressively more involved in advocating democracy for Arab states, a process which had no parallel in Europe. The slow movement in Washington from a policy of containment to one of regime change reached a significant milestone in 1998, with the Clinton Administration passing the Iraq Liberation Act. No parallel movement took place in Europe.

European opposition to a policy of regime change in Iraq meant that little deliberation had taken place in Europe as to what a post-Saddam Iraq may look like. There was also a pronounced wariness in continental Europe regarding the Iraqi opposition. Even a December 2002 conference on the subject of democracy in Iraq had to be moved from Brussels to London because of the sensitivity of the subject for continental Europeans. In Britain, the country closest to the United States on Iraq, relations between Iraqi oppositionists and official circles were few.

Europe's Common Foreign and Security Policy (CFSP) came into being following the Maastricht Treaty in 1993. In 1999, the CFSP was solidified through the creation of the position of its high representative. The Iraq crisis was the most significant test with which the CFSP had yet been required to contend. Iraq, however, saw the EU failing to act as one. Rather, the approach of real crisis resulted in the major powers of the EU splitting; with France and Germany opposing the U.S.-led plans for invasion of Iraq; and the UK aligning itself firmly alongside America and committing troops to the invasion. Other European countries sided with either position, many contributing to the multinational force in Iraq.

== Divisions in the approach to 2003 Iraq war ==
Concern at the ambitions of the Saddam Hussein regime and at the possibility that Iraq was concealing aspects of its weapons of mass destruction (WMD) program from United Nations inspection teams was common to the United States and all member states of the European Union. On the basis of this shared concern, Security Council Resolution 1441 was passed on November 9, 2002, with the appearance of unity within the EU. Evidence of a differing orientation toward the use of force among EU countries, however, was already discernible.

=== France and Germany ===
In France and Germany, the willingness to break openly with Washington on this issue was particularly noticeable from the outset. The U.S. Administration noted and was angered by the use of populist anti-war rhetoric made by then German Chancellor Gerhard Schroeder in his bid for re-election in September 2002. It was the first sign of a new atmosphere of mutual impatience and exasperation between the United States and certain countries in Western Europe. United States Secretary of Defense Donald Rumsfeld's much-quoted comments made at this time differentiating between "Old Europe", (France and Germany) and "New Europe", (countries of Central Europe), who were more sympathetic to America's stance on Iraq, confirmed the attitude of mutual suspicion emerging between the U.S. Administration and the French and German governments.

As military action began to look more and more inevitable in the first months of 2003, French President Jacques Chirac became the main spokesman for the view that UN weapons inspectors needed more time to search Iraq for banned arms. He backed a request by the UN's chief nuclear weapons inspector, Mohamed ElBaradei, for an extension of "several months." The French president noted that his country was coordinating its positions closely with Germany. Germany indeed voiced its opposition to a UN Security Council vote on military action and, unlike France, indicated that it would oppose any request for UN support for military action.

The French desire to act as a counterweight to the United States on the international stage is a perennial feature of international affairs. Germany, however, has been among the most pro-U.S. countries in Europe, and so its emergent opposition to the U.S. stand on Iraq was more surprising. It may be seen as an aspect of Berlin's increasing desire to play an independent, assertive role in international affairs in line with its own public opinion, as well as very deep skepticism in Europe regarding the reasons for war with Iraq.

=== UK and Spain ===
Opposed to the emergent Franco-German alliance against the war were countries representing both "Old" and "New" Europe, in Secretary Rumsfeld's terms. In the former category, both UK Prime Minister Tony Blair and Spanish Prime Minister Jose Maria Aznar were firmly with the U.S. view regarding the supposed danger represented by Iraq. There was clear resentment on the part of both these men for what they regarded as the high-handed attitude of the French president and the sense in which his attitude seemed to imply a situation of natural French leadership in Europe.

Blair placed more stress than did the United States on the need for a clear international mandate for action over Iraq, and was a leading voice in arguing for a second UN Security Council resolution before any further steps were taken. This position was vital from the point of view of the British prime minister's domestic standing, but in practice served only to sharpen the differences between the British and French positions, rendering less likely the possibility of a joint European response.

The rift between the UK and France over the Iraq question cast into bold relief two starkly different positions regarding the role of Europe in world affairs. Thus, broadly supportive of the French and German position were Belgium, Greece, Luxembourg, and neutral states such as the Republic of Ireland. In the Atlanticist corner, meanwhile, apart from the UK were to be found Spain, Italy, the Netherlands, as well as Portugal and Denmark. The support of Central European and Baltic EU member states for the U.S. position, as declared in February 2003, served to anger the French and led to President Chirac's famous outburst that the government of these countries had

"missed an excellent opportunity to keep silent."

These differing stances did not remain on the declarative level alone. With no second UN resolution forthcoming, the UK, along with Spain, Poland, Italy, and the Netherlands, committed troops to the invasion of Iraq. The war thus proceeded without the second UN resolution desired by the UK and with the open opposition of France and Germany. These latter countries found themselves in an unlikely alliance with Russia over the war.

== EU and European states policy on Iraq following the invasion ==
=== Politics and diplomacy ===
Following the invasion and the destruction of the Saddam Hussein regime, the initial stance taken by France, as the main Western opponent of the war, was for the rapid ending of the U.S. and British occupation, and, in its place, the creation of a UN administration of Iraq. The subsequent failure of the United States and its allies to find the Iraqi WMD, over which the war was fought, formed an important backdrop to the subsequent stance taken by France and Germany. It has been noted that France and other European countries were keener on UN involvement in Iraq than the UN itself.

The French were also highly critical of the political arrangements put in place by the United States following the war. On April 5, 2003, French Foreign Minister Dominique de Villepin was scathing about U.S. plans for reconstruction in postwar Iraq. The French foreign minister criticized the United States for the issuing of contracts to U.S. companies. Iraq, he said, should not be seen as a "paradise for invaders", or a pie in which all could have a finger. De Villepin's statements were made at a joint press conference with the German and Russian foreign ministers and are indicative of the atmosphere of anger and suspicion engendered by the war.

For France and its anti-war allies, the issue of the rapid recovery of Iraqi sovereignty and the ending of the American occupation was paramount from the outset. For the UK, leader of the pro-war faction among European countries, the most pressing diplomatic problem following the war was preventing further deterioration in U.S.-EU relations. The British had their own criticisms of U.S. handling of the occupation in the first months. There were differences with the United States over military tactics, with British observers critical of the performance of the 3rd Infantry Division in Baghdad, and particularly of the performance of the team under General Jay Garner, who for a short period administered postwar Iraq. Despite these misgivings, the British commitment of troops in Iraq remained the most significant after that of the United States.

On June 28, 2004, power was formally handed over by CPA Head Paul Bremer to an interim Iraqi government to be led by Ayad Alawi. The handover took place in secret, against the backdrop of the continuing insurgency and bloodshed in Iraq.

France again led the charge in its trenchant criticism of the new arrangements emerging after June 2004. The French were critical of the make-up of the new government, which they maintained did not represent a sufficient departure from the previous, U.S.-led administration.

From June 2004, the beginnings of a more general cautious re-engagement of EU countries with the new Iraq can begin to be discerned. A strategy paper produced by the EU the same month recommended an active European engagement with the new Iraqi government. The document envisaged the EU inviting Iraq to join the EU's Strategic Partnership for the Mediterranean and the Middle East. It also recommended that EU states join in pushing for Iraq to be admitted to the World Trade Organization, and that the EU should reinstate favored trading partner relations with Baghdad.

The essential dividing line in European perceptions on Iraq ran between France and Germany on one hand, and Britain, Poland and Spain on the other. Smaller neutral countries then tended to align with France and Germany, and a number of new member states were with the UK, Poland and Spain.In mid-2004, however, following José María Aznar's defeat in elections by the Spanish Socialist Workers' Party of José Luis Rodríguez Zapatero, Spain effectively crossed over to the other camp. Zapatero announced his intention of withdrawing his country's forces from Iraq. Spain had committed a force of 1,400 troops. Zapatero, demonstrating his fealty to the French view of events in Iraq, initially stated that he might be willing to see Spanish forces stay as part of a UN-led solution in Iraq. Since this was clearly not on the horizon, he ordered their withdrawal, which began on April 20, 2004, and was completed within six weeks.

The announcement on November 22, 2004 of elections in Iraq played a further important role in the slow, cautious re-engagement of European countries. The Netherlands, which had supported the war and which held the EU presidency in the year 2004, was keen to promote practical assistance in the elections. A mission was sent with the intention of exploring the possibility of European monitors taking part in the Iraqi polls.

In the run-up to the elections, U.S. Secretary of State Colin Powell publicly expressed his hopes that the Organization for Security and Cooperation in Europe (OSCE), which played an important role in supervising elections in Ukraine, would undertake similar tasks in Iraq. This did not take place, however, the responsibility for international supervision of the elections of January 30 was undertaken by a relatively small group of 35 UN staffers. The European Commission donated the sum of 31.5 million Euros toward preparation for the elections, which included a training program for Iraqi observers of the electoral process and the deployment of three European experts to Baghdad to work with the UN mission. The small size of this group was attributed to the problematic security situation in Iraq. In addition, an ad hoc group called the International Mission for Iraqi Elections monitored the electoral process from Jordan, because of fears related to the security situation. This mission included members from Britain, but no other EU country.

The elections were hailed as a success and the model of genuine but limited European support for the political process in Iraq was established, and has not been substantially deviated from in subsequent landmark events in Iraq. Thus, EU involvement in the referendum on the constitution consisted of a 20 million Euro contribution toward the constitutional process, which again was channeled through UN bodies working on the referendum. The successful conduct of the referendum was welcomed by European governments and by the Commission. Yet direct European involvement was not a feature of the referendum process.

The "hands off" policy of France, Germany, and the countries that had opposed the war seemed to them to be justified by the failure to return stability to Iraq following the toppling of Saddam Hussein. Further defections from the pro-U.S. camp took place in 2006. Elections in Italy in May 2006 brought to power a coalition called The Union. The new prime minister, Romano Prodi, used his first speech in parliament following his victory to issue a harsh criticism of the war in Iraq. He referred to it as a "grave error" that could ignite war across the Middle East. Prodi announced his intention to withdraw Italy's commitment of 2,700 troops in Iraq. This, together with the substantial cutting down of the Polish contingent in Iraq, left the United States with its British allies almost alone in attempting to maintain their commitments in Iraq.

== European economic relations with Iraq ==
European funding and aid for the reconstruction of Iraq has been limited. Once again, the opposition of principal European countries to the invasion has been the key factor here. At the Madrid donor conference in October 2003, shortly following the invasion, the total of $33 billion was contributed for the reconstruction of Iraq. Of this sum, fully $20 billion came from the United States, $5 billion was donated by Japan, and $1 billion by the UK. France declined to make any contribution. In total, $1.5 billion was donated by other EU member states. European levels of aid to the new Iraq have remained at a modest level. The European Commission as a body has donated €518.5 million. Individual contributions have varied according to the stance toward the war taken by the country, but have remained overall low.

In November 2004, the sensitive issue of Iraq's public debt was addressed in an agreement between the new government in Iraq and Paris Club member states. A major debt reduction plan was agreed upon, which would bring the debt down by 80 percent over three phases, linked to Iraq's compliance with the International Monetary Fund standard program.

Regarding trade with Iraq, the United States is its main trading partner, with 40.7 percent of the total amount traded. The EU is second, with 20.7 percent. The EU is also the second largest exporter to Iraq. Regarding imports, as Iraqi oil production has picked up, so energy exports to Europe have correspondingly increased. Iraq is now tenth among the major energy supplies to Europe. Iraq is responsible, however, for only 1.4 percent of the total of European energy imports. There is thus a long way to go before pre-1991 levels of trade are regained. Trade fell sharply in 1991, before picking up again after the beginning of the oil-for-food program in 1997. By 2001, the EU accounted for 33.3 percent of overall trade and 55 percent of Iraq's imports, after which it began to decrease once again.

European economic engagement with Iraq is thus increasing, and can be expected to continue to increase depending, ultimately, on the level of stability in Iraq. European aid for reconstruction in Iraq, however, has been modest, and here political factors are significant. Countries that opposed the war have been reluctant to contribute largely to the rebuilding of Iraq in a process that they regarded as fundamentally illegitimate. The French refusal to make a donation of any kind at the conference in Madrid in October 2003 offers perhaps the clearest example of this.

== Iraq's foreign relations with EU member states ==
- Austria
- Belgium
- Bulgaria
- Croatia
- Cyprus
- Czech Republic
- Denmark
- Estonia
- Finland
- France
- Germany
- Greece
- Hungary
- (Republic of Ireland) Ireland
- Italy
- Latvia
- Lithuania
- Luxembourg
- Malta
- Netherlands
- Poland
- Portugal
- Romania
- Slovakia
- Slovenia
- Spain
- Sweden

== See also ==
- Foreign relations of Iraq
- Foreign relations of the European Union
- Third country relationships with the European Union
- Euro-Mediterranean free trade area
- United Nations Assistance Mission in Iraq
- Polish involvement in the 2003 invasion of Iraq
- Iraqi diaspora in Europe
- Iraq–United Kingdom relations
- Iraq–United States relations
