= Austria–Iraq relations =

Bilateral relations between Austria and Iraq

- Austria: Iraq

Austria–Iraq relations are the bilateral relations between Austria and Iraq. Austria closed its embassy in Baghdad in 1991 during the Gulf War and did not maintain a diplomatic presence in Iraq for over three decades. The embassy was officially reopened on 12 September 2023 by Austrian Foreign Minister Alexander Schallenberg. Iraq maintains an embassy in Vienna.

== History ==
=== Early relations ===
Austrian Chancellor Bruno Kreisky visited Iraq on 16 March 1976, reflecting Austria's active engagement with the Middle East during the Cold War. Since the 1970s, Austria has also been a partner of the Kurdish population in Iraq, with bilateral relations continuously enhanced through visits and humanitarian cooperation.

=== 1990 Waldheim visit ===
On 25 August 1990, Austrian President Kurt Waldheim visited Baghdad, becoming the first Western head of state to travel to Iraq following its invasion of Kuwait on 2 August. Waldheim described the trip as a "humanitarian mission" and stated that he asked Iraqi President Saddam Hussein to release Western hostages held in Iraq. The European Community criticized the visit as a breach of solidarity among Western nations.

=== 1991 embassy closure ===
In 1991, during the Gulf War, Austria closed its embassy in Baghdad for security reasons. From that point, the Austrian embassy in Amman, Jordan, handled affairs related to Iraq. Austria maintained only a trade mission in Baghdad during the period of closure.

=== 2023 embassy reopening ===
In August 2022, the Austrian government decided to reopen its embassy in Baghdad. On 12 September 2023, Foreign Minister Alexander Schallenberg officially reopened the embassy during a two-day visit to Iraq. Schallenberg held meetings with Iraqi President Abdul Latif Rashid, Prime Minister Mohammed Shia' al-Sudani, and Foreign Minister Fuad Hussein. He was accompanied by representatives of ten Austrian companies active in healthcare, telecommunications, and transportation. Schallenberg also traveled to Erbil, where he opened a bilateral economic forum and met with the leadership of the Kurdistan Region.

At a joint press conference, Schallenberg stated: "Iraq plays an important role in the region's stability. When this country faces instability, it has repercussions for Austria as well."

=== 2024–2025 diplomatic developments ===
On 21 January 2024, Iraqi Foreign Minister Fuad Hussein visited Vienna, where he and Schallenberg signed a Memorandum of Understanding on Political Consultations between the two countries. The two ministers also discussed cooperation in combating illegal migration and internal security.

In October 2025, Iraq and Austria held a round of political consultations in Vienna. Iraqi Ambassador Mohammed Hussein Mohammed Bahr al-Uloom outlined Iraq's recent political progress, and the two sides discussed bilateral, regional, and international issues of common interest.

== Anti-ISIS coalition and security cooperation ==
Austria has been a member of the Global Coalition against Daesh since its inception in 2014. Austria's contribution has focused on humanitarian assistance, stabilization of areas liberated from ISIS, and actions against foreign terrorist fighters. Austria is also a partner contributor to NATO Mission Iraq (NMI), the alliance's non-combat advisory mission in Iraq.

Since the beginning of 2024, a police attaché has been stationed at the Austrian Embassy in Baghdad. A declaration of intent on police cooperation was signed in September 2023 by the police chiefs of both countries in the presence of Foreign Minister Schallenberg.

== Humanitarian aid and stabilization ==
Since 2012, Austria has provided over €20 million in humanitarian assistance to Iraq. In 2023 alone, Austria contributed €1.5 million in humanitarian aid.

During the ISIS crisis, Austria provided €1 million in emergency humanitarian aid for up to 100,000 people in northern Iraq. The Austrian government also delivered eight tons of medical supplies to the Kurdistan Region, enough to provide medical care for 100,000 internally displaced persons for approximately three months.

Austria has made multiple contributions to the UNDP Funding Facility for Stabilization in Iraq, supporting the rehabilitation of schools and infrastructure in areas liberated from ISIS.

== Trade and economic relations ==
In 2024, Austrian exports to Iraq were valued at approximately US$133 million, while Iraqi exports to Austria totaled US$145 million. The top Austrian exports to Iraq were cheese (US$19.6 million), iron pipes (US$14 million), and orthopedic appliances (US$11.7 million). According to the Austrian Federal Economic Chamber, Austrian exports to Iraq amounted to €94.5 million in 2022, an increase of 25% over the previous year.

=== Erste Group loan ===
In September 2024, Iraq's Ministry of Finance signed a €262 million (US$291 million) loan agreement with Austria's Erste Group Bank. The agreement was signed by Iraqi Finance Minister Taif Sami Mohammed and the Austrian Ambassador to Baghdad. The funds are directed toward an irrigation systems project aimed at enhancing Iraq's agricultural infrastructure and alleviating the impact of water scarcity. The Austrian company Bauer is providing technical and advisory support for the project.

=== TÜV Austria ===
Iraq's Ministry of Planning signed a contract with the Austrian company TÜV Austria, granting it a license to conduct inspections and issue certificates of conformity for goods exported to Iraq.

== Migration cooperation ==
Austria and Iraq cooperate on combating illegal migration, with Austria focusing on return and reintegration assistance as well as awareness-raising measures about the risks of irregular migration. Austria has signed cooperation agreements with Iraq on irregular migration, return, and readmission. An EU-funded project in Iraq actively warns potential migrants of the dangers of illegal entry and human smuggling.

== Iraqi diaspora in Austria ==
There are an estimated 5,000 to 10,000 people of Iraqi origin living in Austria, concentrated primarily in Vienna. Iraq has been among the most common countries of origin for asylum seekers in Austria, particularly during the 2015 European migrant crisis.

== Resident diplomatic missions ==
- Iraq has an embassy in Vienna, located at Johannesgasse 26, 1010 Vienna.
- Austria has an embassy in Baghdad, reopened in September 2023.
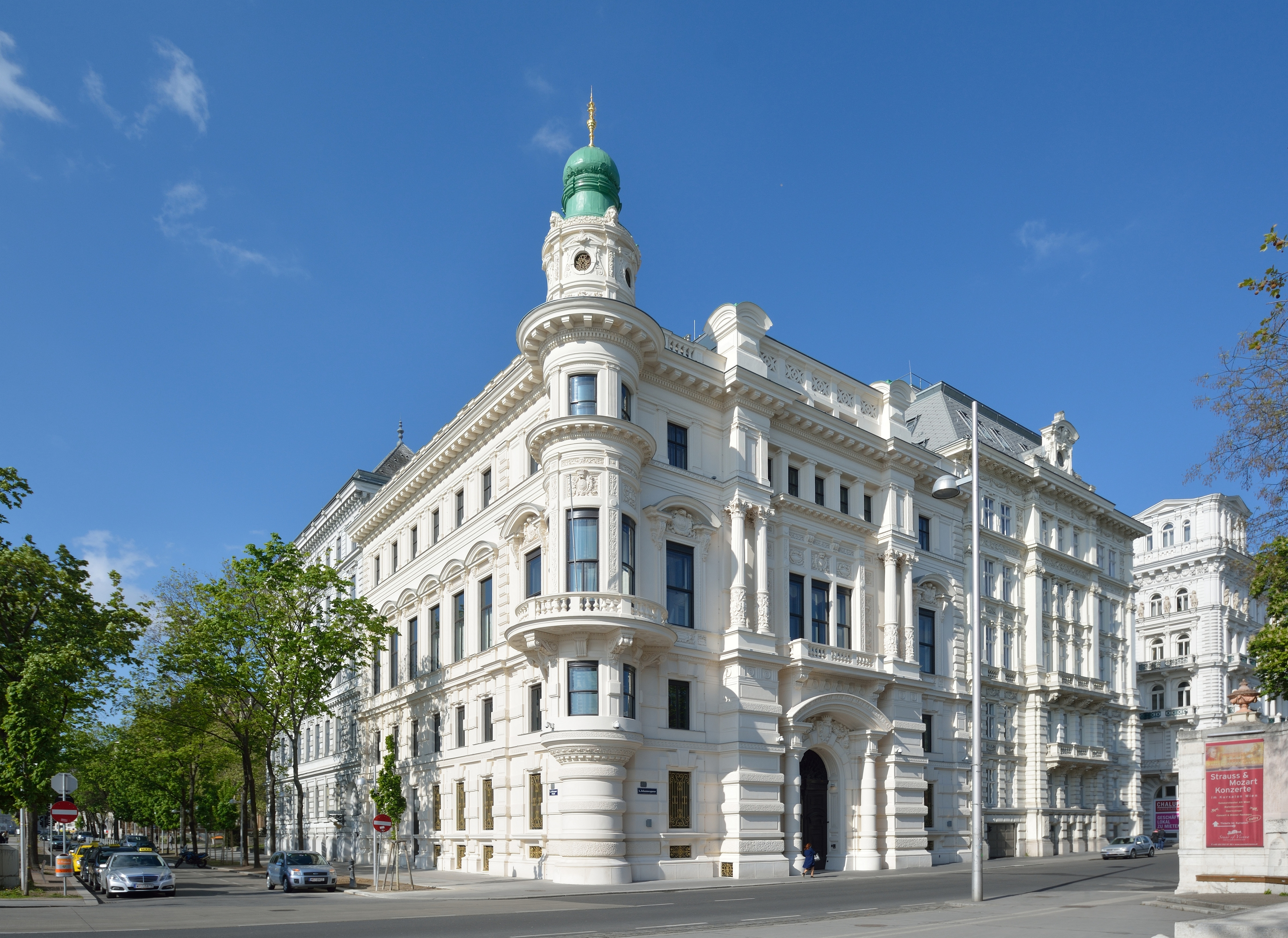
Embassy of Iraq in Vienna

== See also ==
- Foreign relations of Austria
- Foreign relations of Iraq
- Austria–Kurdistan Region relations
- Iraqi diaspora in Europe
