= Iraq–Spain relations =

Bilateral relations between Iraq and Spain

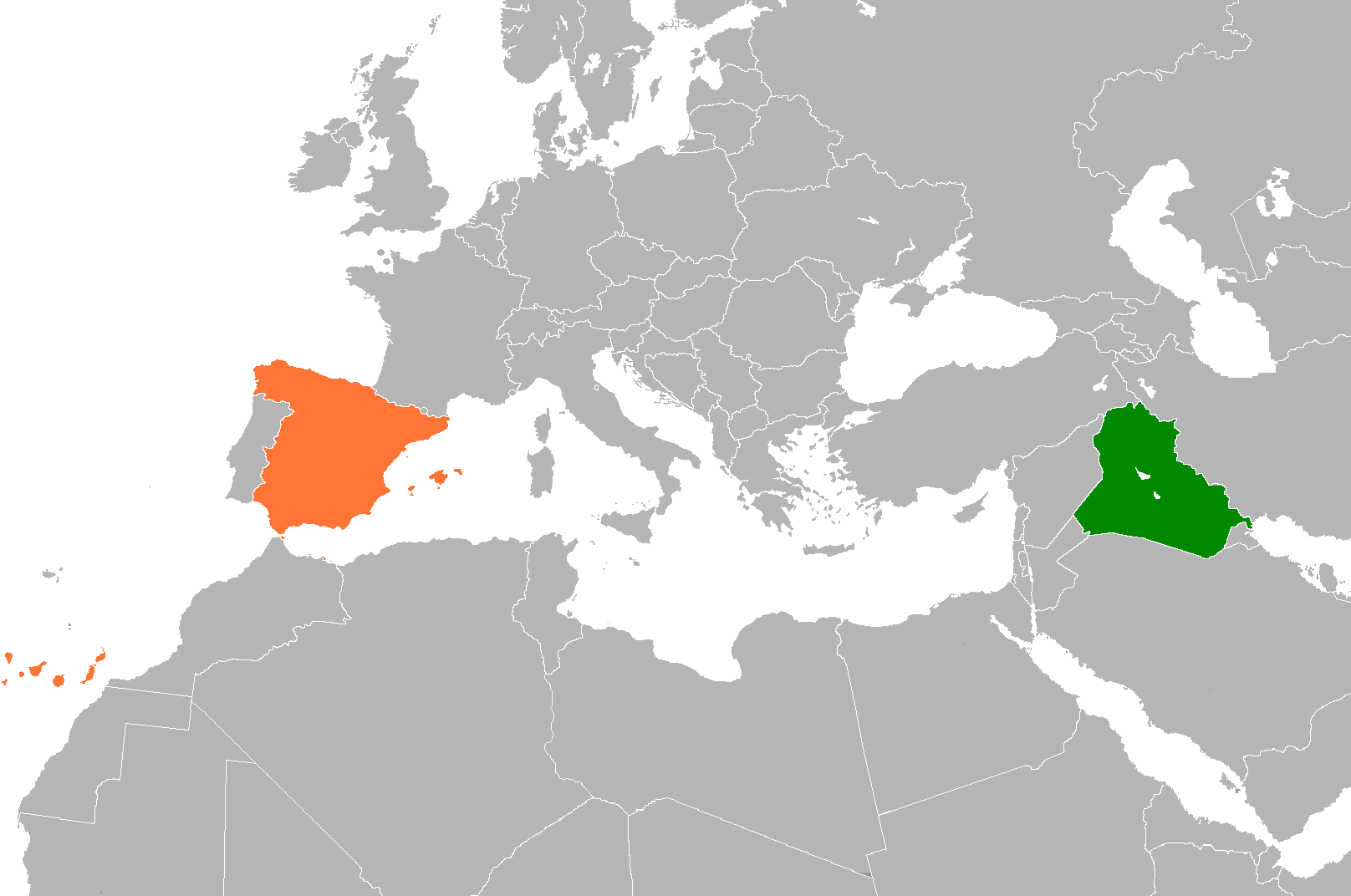
- Iraq: Spain

Iraq–Spain relations are the bilateral relations between Iraq and Spain. Diplomatic relations were established in 1946. Iraq maintains an embassy in Madrid, and Spain maintains an embassy in Baghdad and an honorary consulate in Erbil. Spain deploys approximately 300 military personnel in Iraq as part of the international coalition against ISIS and NATO Mission Iraq.

== History ==
=== Kingdom of Iraq (1946–1958) ===
Diplomatic relations were established between Spain and the Kingdom of Iraq in 1946. In 1948, the Spanish legation was opened in Baghdad, under the Spanish Embassy in Cairo. Spain raised the level of its representation in Iraq to the rank of Embassy in 1955. Prince Regent Abd al-Ilah visited Spain in 1952, and King Faisal II visited in 1956.

=== Republic and Ba'athist era (1958–1990) ===
The regime change of 1958 barely affected bilateral relations. During the 1960s and 1970s, the Hispano-Arab Institute of Culture provided scholarships that allowed many Iraqi students to access Spanish universities for studies in language and literature, medicine, and engineering. Spanish companies began arriving in Iraq in the late 1960s, becoming prominent in civil construction and infrastructure. Iraq was an important client of the Spanish shipbuilding industry, and Spain was a major buyer of Iraqi crude oil.

The Kings of Spain visited Baghdad in 1978, in one of their first state visits to an Arab country. During the 1970s and first half of the 1980s, Spain was one of the European countries of reference in Iraq, with Iraqi Airways maintaining direct flights between Madrid and Baghdad several times a week.

During the Iran–Iraq War (1980–1988), the intensity of the bilateral relationship decreased due to Spanish neutrality in the conflict.

=== Gulf War and aftermath (1990–2003) ===
The invasion of Kuwait in August 1990 led the United Nations to adopt resolutions 660 and 678 and to establish a coalition to liberate Kuwait. Spain participated with a discreet naval and logistical support role. After the Gulf War, diplomatic relations were reduced to the level of Chargé d'Affaires. During the 1990s, Spain participated in the Oil-for-Food Programme. Spain did not reappoint an Ambassador to Baghdad until 2005.

=== Iraq War and withdrawal (2003–2004) ===
On 19 March 2003, the invasion of Iraq commenced, with Spain among the participating nations alongside the United States, the United Kingdom, Australia, and Poland. The Plus Ultra Brigade, comprising some 1,300 Spanish troops, was deployed to support operations in Iraq. A first Spanish humanitarian contingent arrived in Iraq in April 2003. In July 2003, the Spanish contingent was assigned to a multinational division under Polish command, based in Diwaniyah and Karbala.

On 18 April 2004, the Government of Spain ordered the withdrawal of troops, which was completed at the end of June 2004.

== Anti-ISIS Coalition ==
Spain is an active participant in the Global Coalition against Daesh. Since 2015, Spain has been involved in Iraq to contribute to strengthening the Iraqi armed forces through training and capacity-building activities. Spain's contribution involves approximately 480 military personnel delivering training and capacity-building to Iraqi Security Forces. Spain has deployed over 500 personnel in Iraq to support the training of Iraqi security forces.

In October 2024, Spanish Defence Minister Margarita Robles attended a meeting of the Global Coalition against ISIS, reaffirming Spain's commitment to the fight against ISIS in Iraq.

== NATO Mission Iraq ==
Since October 2018, Spain has advised the Iraqi government as part of NATO Mission Iraq (NMI). In May 2026, Lieutenant General Ramón Armada Vázquez of Spain assumed command of NATO Mission Iraq. The Spanish Armed Forces plan to maintain the level of operations abroad during 2026, including the ongoing command of NMI in Iraq.

=== 2026 troop relocation ===
In March 2026, Spain temporarily relocated special forces from Iraq over security fears amid escalating regional tensions. Spain began moving troops out of Iraq as the broader regional conflict pushed security risks higher across the region. Spain prepared to evacuate and relocate military personnel in Iraq following NATO's decision to adjust its mission because of security concerns.

== Recent diplomatic engagement ==
In November 2024, Spanish Prime Minister Pedro Sánchez received Iraqi Prime Minister Mohammed Shia' al-Sudani in what was the first visit to Spain by an Iraqi Prime Minister. Sánchez highlighted the strong ties of friendship and cooperation between the two countries, and Spain's commitment to the reconstruction and modernisation of Iraq through the expansion of bilateral trade and investment. A joint declaration was issued reaffirming commitment to deepening cooperation in priority areas including agriculture, infrastructure, railways, and energy.

In April 2025, Spain and Iraq signed a bilateral cooperation agreement on security and the fight against crime. The two home affairs ministers agreed to extend their cooperation to the areas of civil protection and emergencies.

In 2025, the Iraqi Undersecretary for Bilateral Relations met with the Spanish Ambassador to Iraq to discuss ways to enhance bilateral cooperation across various areas.

== Trade ==
Iraq has a trade surplus of US$974 million with Spain. In 2024, Iraqi exports to Spain reached US$1.2 billion (primarily oil), while Spanish exports to Iraq totalled US$230 million. Spain exported 206 million euros to Iraq in 2023, an 18-percent increase on the previous year.

The Spanish–Iraqi Chamber of Commerce works to expand economic, commercial, and social relations between the two countries.

== Humanitarian aid and development cooperation ==
Spain, the UNDP, and the Government of Iraq have cooperated to strengthen support for the reintegration of Iraqis returning from the Al-Hol camp in Syria. At least 150 families benefit from livelihoods assistance, while 1,000 returnees receive free legal aid to access civil documentation.

== Iraqi diaspora in Spain ==
Since the Iraq War, Spain has hosted 45 Iraqi refugees. An additional 42 Iraqis requested asylum in Spain in 2006.

== Resident diplomatic missions ==
- Iraq has an embassy in Madrid.
- Spain has an embassy in Baghdad and an honorary consulate in Erbil.

== See also ==
- Foreign relations of Iraq
- Foreign relations of Spain
- Iraq–EU relations
- NATO Mission Iraq
- Plus Ultra Brigade
- Operation Inherent Resolve
