= Iraq–Lithuania relations =

Bilateral relations between Iraq and Lithuania

- Iraq: Lithuania

Iraq–Lithuania relations are the bilateral relations between Iraq and Lithuania. Diplomatic relations were established on 24 January 2006. Iraq is accredited to Lithuania through its embassy in Warsaw, Poland. Lithuania maintains an Honorary Consulate in Baghdad.

== History ==
Lithuania and Iraq established diplomatic relations on 24 January 2006, when Lithuanian Foreign Ministry Undersecretary Dalius Čekuolis exchanged diplomatic notes with the Iraqi Ambassador. Iraq was the 147th state with which Lithuania established diplomatic relations. From 2007 to 2011, Dr Walid H. Shiltagh served as the first Ambassador of Iraq to Lithuania, residing in Poland.

In January 2026, Lithuania and Iraq marked the twentieth anniversary of diplomatic relations. The Lithuanian government noted promising opportunities to expand cooperation in the areas of trade, digital transformation, energy, education, and culture.

=== Vilnius letter ===
In 2003, Lithuania was among the ten Central and Eastern European countries known as the "Vilnius 10" group that signed the Vilnius letter, a declaration of support for the US-led 2003 invasion of Iraq. The letter stated that Iraq had violated UN resolutions and pledged support for the United States' position on Iraq.

== Military cooperation ==
=== NATO Training Mission – Iraq ===
Lithuania deployed three trainers to Iraq in September 2007 as part of the NATO Training Mission – Iraq (NTM-I). Lithuania later discontinued its participation in NTM-I, with the last rotation of personnel returning to Lithuania.

=== Global Coalition against ISIS ===
Since 2019, Lithuania has taken part in the Global Coalition against Daesh. Lithuania took part in the US-led Operation Inherent Resolve in Iraq, with an overall contribution of 50 soldiers. Lithuania currently deploys 30 soldiers to the mission.

=== NATO Mission Iraq ===
Lithuania is a permanent contributor to NATO Mission Iraq (NMI), the alliance's non-combat advisory and capacity-building mission in Iraq. Seven Lithuanian servicemembers have been deployed to Iraq with NATO forces as part of the NATO Signal Battalion.

== Humanitarian aid ==
Lithuania has provided humanitarian aid to Iraq on multiple occasions. The Ministry of Foreign Affairs of Lithuania allocated EUR 40,000 in humanitarian aid to Iraq through the UNHCR. Lithuania also provided €30,000 in urgent medical supplies to Iraq.

== Migration crisis ==
In 2021, Lithuania faced a significant irregular migration crisis at its border with Belarus, as Belarusian authorities facilitated the movement of migrants, predominantly from Iraq, toward the EU's external borders. Over 4,100 people crossed the Lithuanian border illegally in 2021, of whom 2,797 were Iraqi nationals.

The crisis became a central topic in bilateral discussions between Iraq and Lithuania. In 2021, Iraqi Foreign Minister Fuad Hussein met with Lithuanian Foreign Minister Gabrielius Landsbergis to discuss the file of migration and the necessary procedures for the return of Iraqi migrants. Minister Hussein affirmed that some Iraqis were still in Lithuania and that Iraq was awaiting their decision to voluntarily return to Baghdad.

On 2 January 2022, 98 Iraqi citizens left Lithuania for Iraq on a charter flight, volunteering to return to their homeland.

== Diplomatic engagement ==
In September 2021, Lithuanian Foreign Minister Gabrielius Landsbergis met with Iraqi Foreign Minister Fuad Hussein in New York. In July 2021, Fuad Hussein received Landsbergis in Baghdad.

Iraqi Prime Minister Mustafa Al-Kadhimi received an official invitation to visit Lithuania. Al-Kadhimi affirmed Iraq's aspiration to build relations with Lithuania, especially in the economic and investment aspects.

Lithuania and Iraq signed a Memorandum of Understanding on deeper diplomatic relations.

== Trade ==
Bilateral trade between Iraq and Lithuania is limited. In 2024, Lithuania exported approximately US$7.93 million to Iraq. The main Lithuanian exports to Iraq were refined petroleum (US$3.91 million) and peat (US$740,000). Both countries participate in the broader EU–Iraq trade framework governed by the European Union–Iraq Partnership and Cooperation Agreement.

== Resident diplomatic missions ==
- Iraq is accredited to Lithuania through its embassy in Warsaw, Poland.
- Lithuania maintains an Honorary Consulate in Baghdad, located at Karaded Meriam, Dour AlSikak Quarter 220, Street 8, House 39.

== See also ==
- Foreign relations of Iraq
- Foreign relations of Lithuania
- Vilnius letter
- NATO Mission Iraq
- Belarus–European Union border crisis
