= Iraq–Latvia relations =

Bilateral relations between Iraq and Latvia

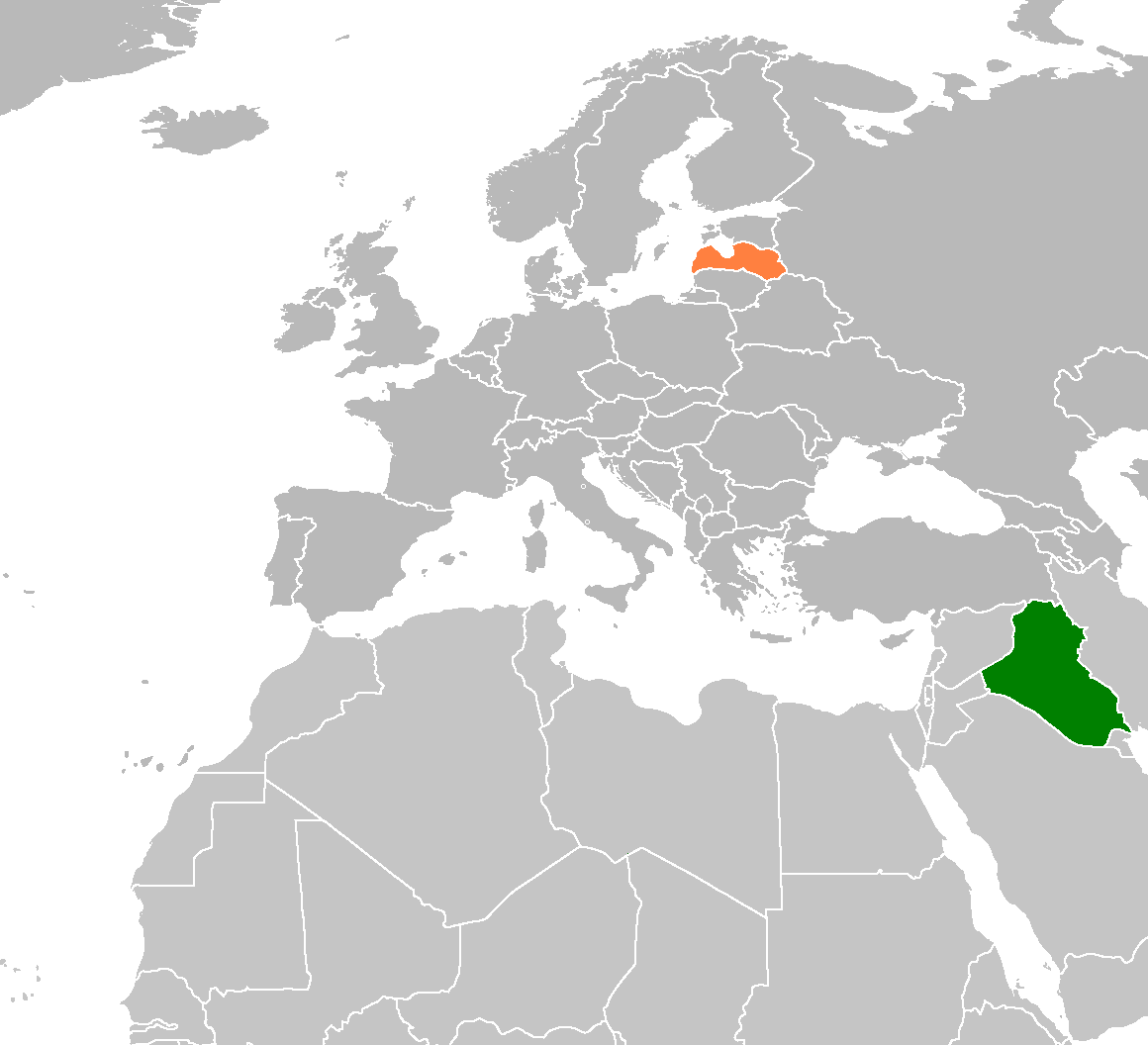

- Iraq: Latvia

Iraq–Latvia relations are the bilateral relations between Iraq and Latvia. Iraq recognized the independence of Latvia on 1 January 1992. Neither country maintains a resident embassy in the other. Latvia's diplomatic affairs with Iraq are handled through its embassy in Ankara, Turkey, while Iraq is accredited to Latvia through its embassy in Helsinki, Finland.

== History ==
Iraq recognized the restored independence of Latvia on 1 January 1992, following the dissolution of the Soviet Union. Diplomatic relations between the two countries were subsequently established.

== Iraq War (2003–2007) ==
Latvia's participation in the Iraq War commenced in May 2003, when the country sent troops to Iraq as a contribution to post-war stabilisation. The Latvian contingent included a logistics support platoon and an explosive ordnance disposal (EOD) unit. At their peak, approximately 100 Latvian soldiers were deployed in Iraq.

The Saeima (Latvian parliament) voted to extend the mission of Latvian troops in Iraq to the end of 2006. Latvia's participation in the Iraq War continued from May 2003 until June 2007. Three Latvian soldiers died during the deployment.

== NATO Mission Iraq ==
Latvia is a contributor to NATO Mission Iraq (NMI), the alliance's non-combat advisory and capacity-building mission in Iraq. Latvia has participated in all NATO-led operations in the Balkans, Iraq, and Afghanistan. The Saeima adopted a decision supporting the participation of National Armed Forces troops in the NATO mission in Iraq until 1 November 2022. In 2025, Latvia planned to send 34 troops to participate in the latest iteration of the NATO mission in Iraq.

== EU Advisory Mission in Iraq ==
Latvia has contributed to the European Union Advisory Mission in Iraq (EUAM Iraq). In January 2024, the Latvian Cabinet approved Ilvars Dreimanis as the first Latvian civilian expert for EUAM Iraq, serving as Senior Strategic Adviser. EUAM Iraq has supported Iraqi border authorities through study visits to Latvia, covering Latvia's integrated border management model, immigration control, and criminal investigation practices.

At the EU–Iraq Cooperation Council meeting, Latvia's Foreign Minister emphasized that Latvia continues to work closely with Iraqi authorities, sharing its experience and best practices in border management.

== Humanitarian aid ==
The Latvian Cabinet approved a donation of €50,000 to the UNHCR for humanitarian aid in Iraq. Latvia has also provided technical assistance to Iraq through the UNDP.

== Diplomatic engagement ==
In September 2024, Iraqi Foreign Minister Fuad Hussein met with Latvian Foreign Minister Baiba Braže on the sidelines of the 79th session of the United Nations General Assembly in New York. The two sides discussed bilateral cooperation, particularly in the fields of security, technology, and digital governance.

== Trade ==
Bilateral trade between Iraq and Latvia is minimal. In 2024, Latvian exports to Iraq were valued at a low level, with Iraqi exports to Latvia remaining negligible. Both countries are members of the broader EU–Iraq trade framework governed by the EU–Iraq Cooperation Agreement.

== Migration ==
Iraq has been among the main countries of origin for asylum seekers in Latvia. During the 2021 Belarus–European Union border crisis, Latvia detained 218 migrants, mostly Iraqis, over a four-day period in August 2021, and declared a three-month state of emergency at its border.

== Resident diplomatic missions ==
- Latvia does not maintain a resident embassy in Iraq. Diplomatic affairs are handled through the Latvian embassy in Ankara, Turkey.
- Iraq does not maintain a resident embassy in Latvia. Iraq is accredited to Latvia through its embassy in Helsinki, Finland.

== See also ==
- Foreign relations of Iraq
- Foreign relations of Latvia
- NATO Mission Iraq
- Operation Inherent Resolve
- 2021 Belarus–European Union border crisis
