= EUAM =

EUAM may mean :

- European Union Administration of Mostar,
- EUAM Ukraine: European Union Advisory Mission for Civilian Security Sector Reform in Ukraine (2022–),
- European Union Advisory Mission in Iraq (EUAM Iraq, 2017–)
