= Belgium–Iraq relations =

Bilateral relations between Belgium and Iraq

- Belgium: Iraq

Belgium–Iraq relations are the bilateral relations between Belgium and Iraq. Diplomatic relations were established on 5 December 1946. Iraq maintains an embassy in Brussels, which also serves as Iraq's mission to the European Union. Belgium does not have a resident embassy in Baghdad; its ambassador to Iraq is accredited from the Belgian embassy in Amman, Jordan.

== History ==
Diplomatic relations between Belgium and Iraq were formally established on 5 December 1946. During the Iraq War, a Belgian-registered Airbus A300 cargo aircraft operated by the Belgian division of European Air Transport (DHL) was struck by a surface-to-air missile shortly after takeoff from Baghdad International Airport on 22 November 2003. The aircraft sustained severe wing damage and a complete loss of hydraulic systems but landed safely.

In February 2020, Belgian Minister of Foreign Affairs and Defence Philippe Goffin visited Baghdad and Erbil, meeting with Iraqi Foreign Minister Mohammed al-Hakim and Iraqi President Barham Salih. The two sides agreed to continue cooperation in combating terrorism. Goffin also visited the Kurdistan Region, where he expressed gratitude for the region's hosting of internally displaced persons.

In March 2022, the Iraqi Ministry of Foreign Affairs called on Belgium to open a resident embassy in Baghdad. Iraqi Foreign Minister Fuad Hussein reiterated the request, emphasizing the importance of strengthening bilateral relations and expanding cooperation in education, diplomatic training, and aviation.

In 2023, Iraqi Prime Minister Mohammed Shia' al-Sudani met with Serge Dickschen, the non-resident Ambassador of Belgium to Iraq, to discuss bilateral relations and investment opportunities. In June 2025, the Iraqi Undersecretary for Bilateral Relations received Ambassador Dickschen at the Ministry's headquarters in Baghdad to discuss prospects for cooperation across various sectors.

== Anti-ISIS coalition ==
On 24 September 2014, Belgium announced its participation in the US-led coalition against the Islamic State (ISIS). The Belgian contribution, codenamed Operation Desert Falcon, involved the deployment of six F-16 fighter jets and approximately 120 military personnel to Muwaffaq Salti Air Base near Azraq, Jordan. Belgian F-16s conducted their first airstrikes against ISIS positions in Iraq on 6 October 2014.

Operation Desert Falcon was conducted in three phases over seven years:

- October 2014 – June 2015: Initial deployment of six F-16s and 120 personnel to Jordan.
- July 2016 – December 2017: Second deployment, with Belgian F-16s replacing Dutch aircraft. The Belgian government approved the extension of operations to include strikes in Syria.
- October 2020 – September 2021: Final deployment of 120 soldiers to Jordan to prevent an ISIS resurgence.

Over a total of 37 months of operations, Belgian pilots conducted 1,291 missions (approximately 5% of all coalition air missions), dropping nearly 1,000 precision-guided bombs during 11,800 flight hours.

In addition to air operations, Belgium contributed to the training of Iraqi security forces. Under Operation Valiant Phoenix, 23 Belgian soldiers were stationed near Baghdad to provide training and advice to elite Iraqi army units. As of 2026, approximately ten Belgian military personnel remain deployed in Kuwait, supporting the headquarters of coalition Operation Inherent Resolve.

== Humanitarian aid and stabilization ==
Belgium has provided humanitarian and stabilization assistance to Iraq through multiple channels. In 2014, Belgium allocated EUR 13.5 million in humanitarian aid to support vulnerable populations in Iraq, including internally displaced persons and Syrian refugees. The funding was distributed through UNHCR (EUR 2 million for refugee camps in Iraqi Kurdistan), the FAO (EUR 2 million for agricultural programmes), the OCHA (EUR 1 million for coordination), and the UN Humanitarian Coordinator (EUR 6 million for immediate needs). An additional EUR 2 million was directed to the UNDP Funding Facility for Immediate Stabilization, and EUR 500,000 was earmarked for demining projects.

In November 2022, Belgium made its eighth contribution to the UNDP Funding Facility for Stabilization, adding EUR 1.5 million and bringing its total support to over US$15 million. The funding supported the rehabilitation of infrastructure in five governorates: Anbar, Diyala, Kirkuk, Ninewa, and Salah al-Din.

Belgium also contributed EUR 1 million to UNHCR for cash assistance to vulnerable Syrian refugees in Iraq and EUR 1 million to the World Food Programme (WFP) for displaced families.

== Trade ==
In 2024, Belgian exports to Iraq were valued at approximately US$237 million, while Iraqi exports to Belgium totaled US$12.2 million, giving Belgium a trade surplus of US$224 million. The top Belgian exports to Iraq were vaccines and pharmaceutical products (US$40.8 million), animal food (US$27.9 million), and packaged medicaments (US$26.2 million). Iraqi exports to Belgium consisted primarily of coal tar oil (US$9.61 million) and precious metal scraps (US$1.4 million).

In 2025, Iraqi Prime Minister al-Sudani called on Belgian companies to invest in Iraq, citing the country's improved security and stability. Discussions between the two countries have focused on cooperation in clean energy, infrastructure, and water management.

== Iraqi diaspora in Belgium ==
There are approximately 21,000 people of Iraqi origin living in Belgium. Iraq and Syria have been among the most common countries of origin for asylum seekers in Belgium. The International Organization for Migration (IOM) has assisted Iraqi refugees in resettling from Jordan and Syria to Belgium.

== Resident diplomatic missions ==
- Iraq has an embassy in Brussels, which also serves as its mission to the European Union.
- Belgium does not maintain a resident embassy in Iraq. The Belgian ambassador to Iraq is accredited from the embassy in Amman, Jordan.

== See also ==
- Foreign relations of Belgium
- Foreign relations of Iraq
- 2003 Baghdad DHL attempted shootdown incident
- Operation Inherent Resolve
- Iraqi diaspora in Europe
