= Iraq–Ireland relations =

Bilateral relations between Iraq and Ireland

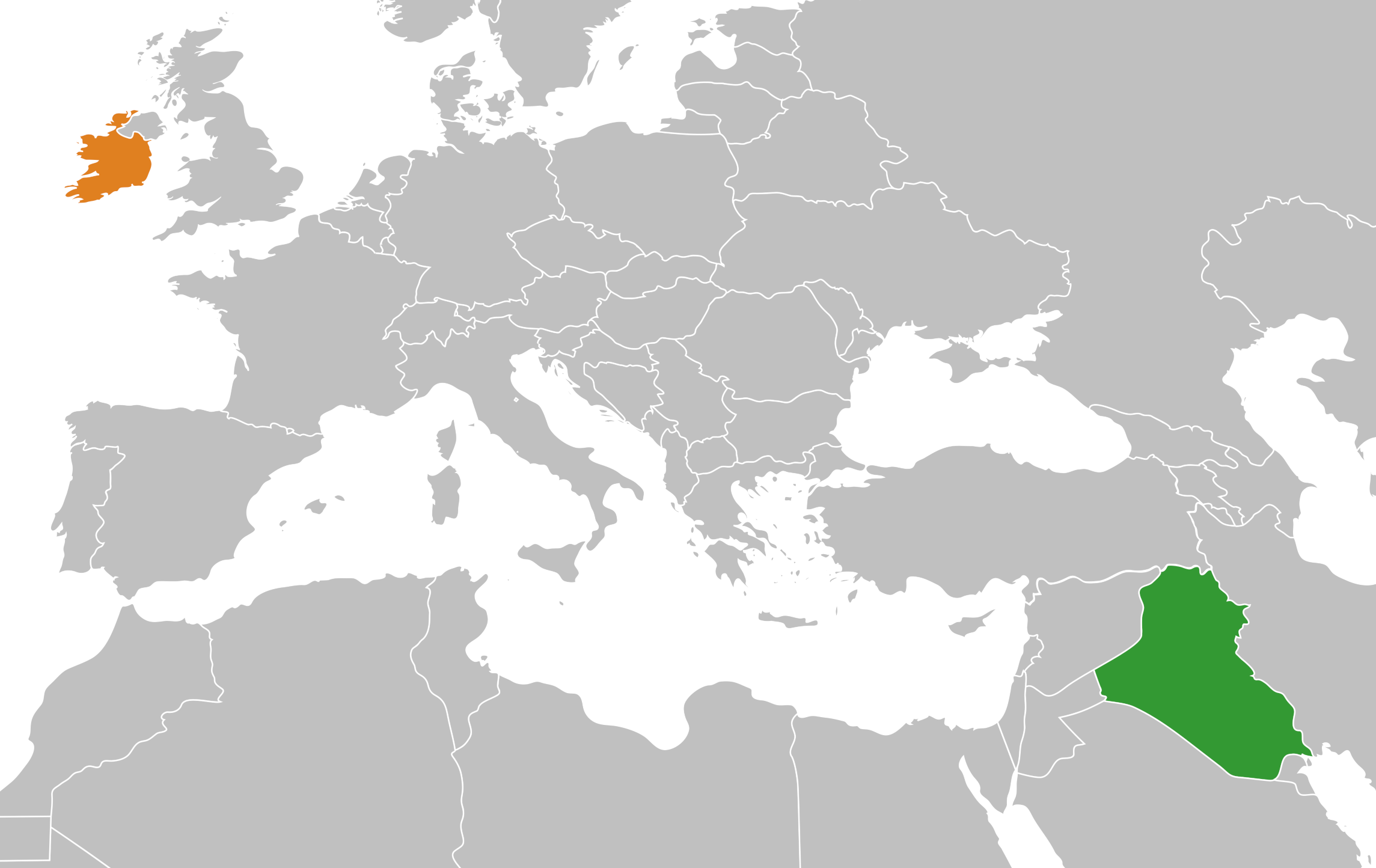

- Iraq: Ireland

Iraq–Ireland relations are the bilateral relations between the Republic of Iraq and the Republic of Ireland. Diplomatic relations were established on 15 January 1964. Ireland is represented in Iraq through its embassy in Amman, Jordan. Iraq maintains an embassy in Dublin, which was officially opened in October 2024.

== History ==
Diplomatic relations between Iraq and Ireland were formally established on 15 January 1964. Ireland did not enter into non-residential diplomatic relations with Iraq until June 1980. In 1978, Ireland's exports to Iraq totalled IR£3.74 million. The United Nations trade embargo on Iraq following the 1990 invasion of Kuwait significantly reduced Irish exports to the region throughout the 1990s.

== UN peacekeeping ==
Following the conclusion of the Iran–Iraq War in 1988, Ireland sent 177 personnel to supervise the ceasefire as part of the United Nations Iran–Iraq Military Observer Group (UNIIMOG). Ireland has maintained a continuous presence on UN peacekeeping operations since 1958.

== Humanitarian aid ==
The Irish Government has provided humanitarian assistance to Iraq on multiple occasions. The Government announced €5 million in humanitarian assistance for the alleviation of suffering of innocent civilians in Iraq. Ireland also announced €6 million in humanitarian aid to Iraq and Yemen during periods of active conflict. Irish Aid delivered 80 tonnes of aid to Iraq for Oxfam to distribute to vulnerable people fleeing the conflict in Mosul.

== 2024 embassy opening in Dublin ==
In October 2024, the Iraqi government officially opened its embassy in Dublin, in an attempt to strengthen bilateral relations and consolidate the foundations of cooperation and friendship between the two countries. The Iraqi Foreign Minister inaugurated the embassy, which is expected to serve as a platform for advancing bilateral engagement and providing services to the growing Iraqi community in Ireland. The embassy is located at 8 Fitzwilliam Place, Dublin.

== Diplomatic engagement ==
In October 2024, Iraqi Foreign Minister Fuad Hussein visited Ireland as part of a European tour. During the visit, President Michael D. Higgins received Fuad Hussein at Áras an Uachtaráin on a courtesy call. The Iraqi and Irish Foreign Ministers discussed strengthening bilateral relations, with Minister Hussein highlighting Iraq as a promising investment environment.

== Trade ==
Bilateral trade between Iraq and Ireland is heavily weighted in Ireland's favour. In 2024, Ireland exported approximately US$183 million to Iraq, while Iraqi exports to Ireland totalled only US$14,100, giving Iraq a trade deficit of US$183 million. Irish exports to Iraq are primarily composed of pharmaceutical products, medical equipment, and agricultural goods. Both countries participate in the broader EU–Iraq trade framework governed by the European Union–Iraq Partnership and Cooperation Agreement, which was signed in 2012 and entered into force in August 2018.

== Iraqi diaspora in Ireland ==
There are approximately 1,081 Iraqis living in Ireland. Sources estimate that there are 340 Iraqi refugees living in Ireland. The Iraqi embassy in Dublin provides consular services and supports the Iraqi community in Ireland.

== Resident diplomatic missions ==
- Iraq has an embassy in Dublin, opened in October 2024.
- Ireland does not maintain a resident embassy in Iraq. Diplomatic affairs are handled through the Irish embassy in Amman, Jordan.

== See also ==
- Foreign relations of Iraq
- Foreign relations of Ireland
- United Nations Iran–Iraq Military Observer Group
- Iraqi diaspora in Europe
