= Iraqis in Norway =

Total population
- 33,924 (2019 Official Norway estimate) 0.64% of the Norwegian population

Regions with significant populations
- Oslo

Languages
- Norwegian and Mesopotamian Arabic also Kurdish (Sorani and Kurmanji dialects), Turkish (Iraqi Turkmen/Turkoman dialects), Neo-Aramaic, (Assyrian and Mandaic)

Religion
- Predominantly Islam (Shia and Sunni); Minority Syriac Christianity and Chaldean Catholicism

Related ethnic groups
- Arabs, Armenians, Assyrians, Azeris, Iranians, Kurds, Mizrahim, Turks; Some descendants Norwegians

Iraqis in Norway make up approximately 33,924 people. They are mostly refugees from the Iran–Iraq War, the Saddam regime and in particular the Iraq War.

== Demographics ==
As of 1 January 2012, the Norwegian Statistisk Sentralbyrå reported that there were 28,935 Iraqis in Norway of which 21,784 are first generation immigrants and 7,151 are born in Norway to two Iraqi parents. Iraqis are a group of refugees with a relatively short duration of residence in Norway (80 percent have lived in Norway less than 10 years). Around one fourth of all Iraqis in Norway lives in the city of Oslo.

== Crime ==
According to Statistics Norway, in the 2010-2013 period, the proportion of Iraqi-born perpetrators of criminal offences aged 15 and older in Norway was 125.3 per 1000 residents. When corrected for variables such as age and gender as well as employment, the total decreased to 102.1. This is higher compared to the averages of 44.9 among native Norwegians. Iraqi-born perpetrators of criminal offences were higher than other Asian immigrants. For Iranian-born perpetrators of criminal offences it was 108,6 and 97,7 after age and gender adjustment. For Chinese-born perpetrators of criminal offences it was 34.4 and 29.3 after age and gender adjustment.

== See also ==
- Iraqi diaspora
- Iraqi diaspora in Europe
- Demographics of Norway
- Immigration to Norway
- Iraqis in Denmark
- Iraqis in Finland
- Iraqis in Sweden
