= Estonia–Iraq relations =

Bilateral relations between Estonia and Iraq

- Estonia: Iraq

Estonia–Iraq relations are the bilateral relations between Estonia and Iraq. Estonia recognized the Republic of Iraq on 21 August 1991, and diplomatic relations were established on 24 September 1991. Iraq is represented in Estonia through its embassy in Helsinki, Finland. Estonia does not maintain a resident embassy in Iraq; diplomatic affairs are handled through the Estonian Ministry of Foreign Affairs in Tallinn and the Estonian embassy in Ankara, Turkey.

== History ==
Diplomatic relations between Estonia and Iraq were established on 24 September 1991, shortly after Estonia regained its independence from the Soviet Union. Estonia recognized Iraq on 21 August 1991.

In 2023, the Ambassador of Iraq to Estonia (resident in Helsinki) presented credentials to Estonian officials, reaffirming bilateral ties.

== Anti-ISIS coalition ==
Estonia joined the US-led coalition against the Islamic State (ISIS) in 2014. The Estonian contribution to Operation Inherent Resolve included the deployment of military personnel to Iraq to support coalition operations. Estonian troops served alongside coalition forces in Iraq, contributing to training and advisory missions.

In 2023, the Riigikogu (Estonian parliament) extended the mandate for Estonian forces serving in Iraq. In 2024, Estonian soldiers completed their deployment and returned from Iraq.

Estonia is also a partner contributor to NATO Mission Iraq (NMI), the alliance's non-combat advisory and capacity-building mission in Iraq.

== Humanitarian aid and stabilization ==
In April 2022, Estonia, along with the Czech Republic and Slovakia, contributed over US$334,041 to humanitarian mine action initiatives in Iraq through the United Nations Mine Action Service (UNMAS). The funding supported the clearance of explosive hazards in areas previously controlled by ISIS, facilitating the safe return of displaced populations.

Estonia has also contributed to the UNDP Funding Facility for Stabilization in Iraq, supporting the rehabilitation of infrastructure in areas liberated from ISIS.

== Trade ==
In 2024, Estonian exports to Iraq were valued at approximately US$3.26 million. The top Estonian exports to Iraq were broadcasting equipment (US$1.3 million), scenting mixtures (US$347,000), and packaged medicaments (US$314,000). Over the five-year period from 2019 to 2024, Estonian exports to Iraq grew at an annualized rate of 11.9%, increasing from US$1.87 million to US$3.26 million. Iraqi exports to Estonia remain minimal.

== Resident diplomatic missions ==
- Iraq is accredited to Estonia through its embassy in Helsinki, Finland.
- Estonia does not maintain a resident embassy in Iraq. Diplomatic affairs are handled through the Estonian Ministry of Foreign Affairs in Tallinn and the Estonian embassy in Ankara, Turkey.

== See also ==
- Foreign relations of Estonia
- Foreign relations of Iraq
- Operation Inherent Resolve
- NATO Mission Iraq
