= Arjan Goljahanpoor =

Finnish footballer (born 1995)

Personal information
- Date of birth: 7 June 1995 (age 31)
- Place of birth: Jyväskylä, Finland
- Height: 1.82 m (6 ft 0 in)
- Positions: Midfielder; winger

Team information
- Current team: JJK
- Number: 9

Youth career
- –2011: FCJ Blackbird
- 2012–2014: JJK

Senior career*
Years	Team	Apps	(Gls)
2015–2016	JJK	8	(2)
2016	→ JJK II / Villiketut	8	(2)
2016	→ FC Vaajakoski (loan)	8	(1)
2017	FC Vaajakoski	18	(8)
2018	GBK	23	(13)
2019	TPV	26	(4)
2020	MyPa	10	(0)
2021–2022	MP	41	(5)
2021	→ Savilahden Urheilijat	1	(0)
2023–	JJK	96	(33)
- * Club domestic league appearances and goals as of 7 November 2026

Arjan Goljahanpoor (born 7 June 1995) is a Finnish professional footballer who plays as a midfielder for Ykkönen club JJK Jyväskylä.

== Club career ==
On 13 January 2023, Goljahanpoor signed with JJK and returned to his former club in his hometown Jyväskylä.

== Personal life ==
Born in Finland, Goljahanpoor is of Iraqi descent. He holds a dual Finnish-Iraqi citizenship. Besides football, Goljahanpoor has played futsal.
