= Iraqis in Germany =

Iraqis in Germany Iraker in Deutschland
- Distribution of Iraqi citizens in Germany (2021)

Total population
- 500,000+ (2025) (Note: 1st and 2nd generation only (omits 3rd generation and onward))

Regions with significant populations
- Berlin, Cologne, Hamburg, Munich, Frankfurt, Stuttgart, Hanover

Languages
- German and Mesopotamian Arabic, also Kurdish (Sorani and Kurmanji dialects), Turkish (Iraqi Turkmen/Turkoman dialects), and Northeastern Neo-Aramaic

Religion
- Islam (Shia and Sunni), Syriac Christianity, Mandaeism and Yezidism

Iraqis in Germany (Arabic: عراقيون في ألمانيا, romanized: ʻIrāqīyūn fī Almāniyā) include migrants from Iraq to Germany, as well as their descendants. The number of Iraqis and Iraqi-Germans in Germany was estimated at around 500,000+ people in 2025, including the new generation. The Iraqi community is ethnically, culturally and linguistically diverse and includes Mesopotamian Arabs, Kurds, Iraqi Turkmen, Mandaeans, Assyrians and Yezidis.

== History and population ==
The number of Iraqi citizens in Germany is estimated at around 250,000. Between 2010 and 2019, Germany granted around 70% of Iraqi asylum applications, although most of these are subject to regular review.

In 2019, Germany received 13,700 applications for asylum from Iraqis. The country is already home to a sizeable Iraqi population, many of whom were granted protection by the German authorities after fleeing persecution from Saddam Hussein’s former regime.

However, Germany has adopted another policy towards Iraqi refugees which has distinguished it from all other EU states, the German Federal Ministry of the Interior has taken the unique step of systematically revoking the refugee status of thousands of Iraqis who were granted protection before 2003. Since the threat of persecution from the Iraqi Ba’ath regime is no longer present, 18,000 Iraqi refugees who entered the country before the 2003 invasion have thus had their refugee status revoked, placing them in a situation of uncertainty and precariousness. In June 2007, the German government asked the asylum authorities to temporarily suspend the revocation of refugee status for certain groups of Iraqis, such as those from Baghdad, single women, and members of religious or ethnic minorities such as Iraqi Assyrians. 70,000+

Number of Iraqis in larger cities
#	City	People
1.	Munich	11,093
2.	Berlin	9,396
3.	Cologne	8,341
4.	Bielefeld	5,561
5.	Hamburg	5,400
6.	Essen	5,367
7.	Hanover	4,913
8.	Nuremberg	4,745
9.	Oldenburg	3,635
10.	Pforzheim	3,563

== Notable people ==
- Reem Alabali-Radovan, politician
- Laith Al-Deen, pop musician born to Iraqi father and German mother
- Dunja Hayali, journalist and television presenter.
- Yasemin Mansoor, crowned Miss Germany in 1996 (Turkish-Iraqi origin)
- Karo Murat, professional boxer
- Najem Wali, novelist and journalist
- Khalid al-Maaly, writer and publisher
- Iqbal al-Qazwini, journalist and novelist.
- Claudia Basrawi, German actress and writer born to Iraqi father and German mother
- Rafid Ahmed Alwan al-Janabi, German citizen who defected from Iraq
- Faris Al-Sultan, Ironman World Championship Born to Iraqi father and German mother
- Alexander Ridha, Electronic music record producer, songwriter, and DJ

== See also ==
- Iraqis
- Iraqi diaspora
- Iraqi diaspora in Europe
- Immigration to Germany
- Germany–Iraq relations
- Assyrians in Germany
- Iranians in Germany
- Kurds in Germany
- Turks in Germany
- Arabs in Germany
