= Iraqis in Finland =

Iraqis in Finland / Finnish Iraqis Irakilaiset Suomessa / Suomen irakilaiset

Total population
- 31,215 of Iraqi ancestry (23,474 Iraqi-born, 12,586 Iraqi citizens, 12,522 dual citizens) (2025)

Regions with significant populations
- Helsinki, Turku and Tampere regions

Languages
- Finnish and Mesopotamian Arabic also Kurdish (Sorani and Kurmanji dialects), Turkish (Iraqi Turkmen/Turkoman dialects), and Neo-Aramaic (Assyrian and Mandaic)

Religion
- Islam (Shia and Sunni), Christianity, Mandaeanism

Related ethnic groups
- Swedish Iraqis, Iraqis in Denmark, Iraqis in Norway

Iraqis in Finland (Arabic: العراقيون في فنلندا, romanized: al-ʻIrāqīyūn fī Finlandā) are residents of the Republic of Finland who have Iraqi ancestry. Among them are Finnish-born native citizens, Iraqi-born naturalised citizens, as well as Iraqi nationals residing in Finland. As of 2025, a total number of 31,215 people of Iraqi ancestry live in Finland. Of the total number of Iraqis in the country, 23,474 people were born in Iraq, 12,586 have Iraqi citizenship and 12,522 have dual citizenship.

== Migration ==
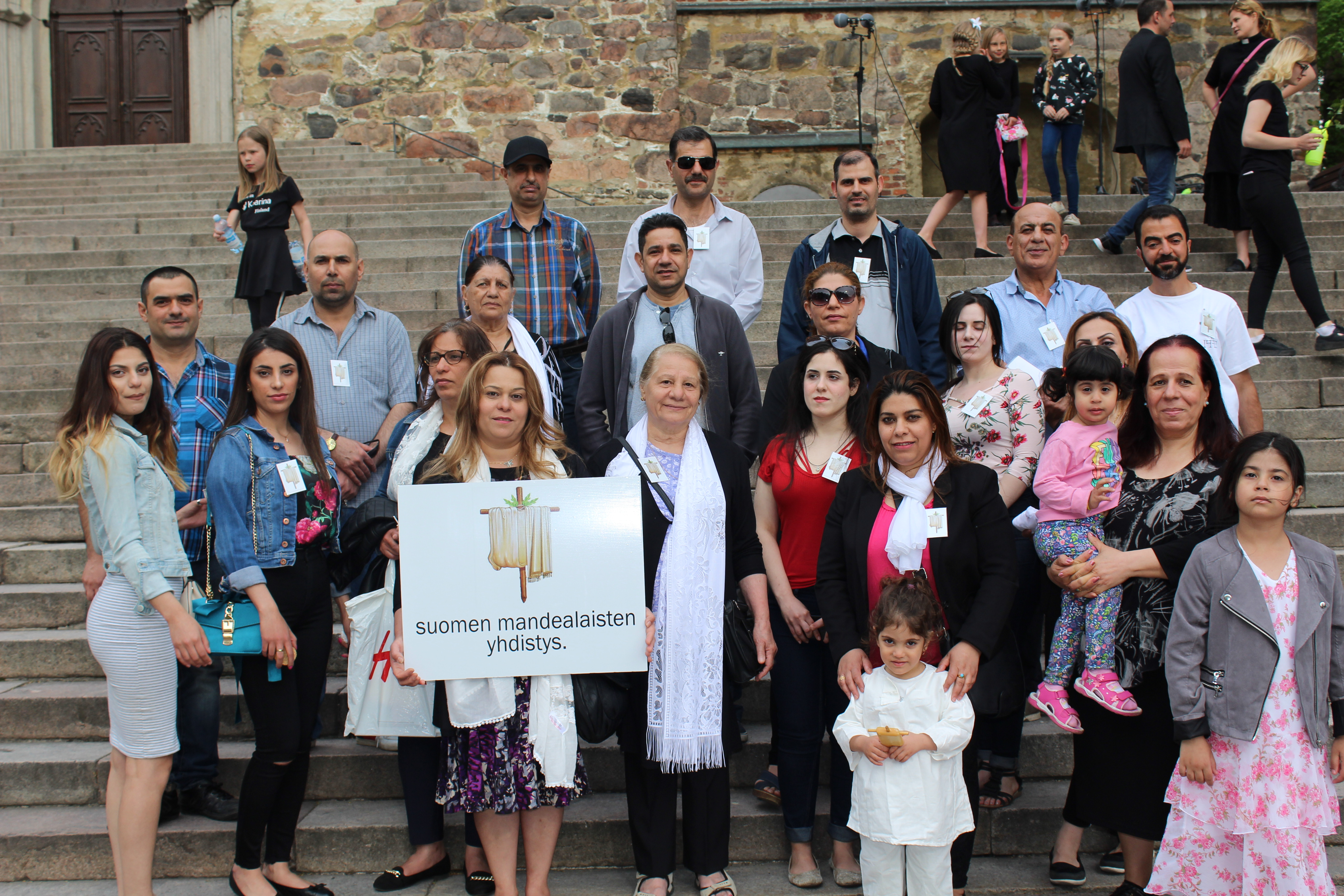
Iraqi Mandaean community in Finland, May 2018

Most Iraqis in Finland have come as refugees. Of the 32,000 people who sought asylum in Finland in 2015, 21,000 were Iraqis, or two-thirds of all asylum seekers.

=== Asylum based on clan feuds ===
Iraq is a clan-based society like many in the Middle East. Many Iraqis claim asylum in Finland on the basis that they are threatened by rival clans in their home country, but the refugee conventions state that asylum is granted on the basis of being persecuted by authorities of a country. Persecution by other civilians is primarily a concern of police in the country of origin. This creates contradictions because officials in Iraqi police authorities might themselves be members of a rival clan.

=== Mandaeans ===
Finland has a community of Iraqi Mandaeans.

== Demographics ==
Historical population
| Year | Pop. | ±% p.a. |
|---|---|---|
| 1990 | 194 | — |
| 1995 | 1,351 | +47.42% |
| 2000 | 3,209 | +18.89% |
| 2005 | 4,352 | +6.28% |
| 2010 | 7,167 | +10.49% |
| 2015 | 10,723 | +8.39% |
| 2020 | 20,090 | +13.38% |
| 2025 | 23,474 | +3.16% |
Iraqi-born. Source: Statistics Finland

People born in Iraq and living in Finland, according to Statistics Finland.

Country of birth Iraq by municipality (2024)
| Municipality | Population |
|---|---|
| Whole country | 23,120 |
| Helsinki | 6,377 |
| Vantaa | 3,619 |
| Espoo | 3,425 |
| Turku | 2,462 |
| Tampere | 1,192 |
| Lahti | 695 |
| Oulu | 527 |
| Vaasa | 346 |
| Jyväskylä | 303 |
| Hämeenlinna | 260 |
| Salo | 260 |
| Kerava | 212 |
| Kuopio | 185 |
| Pori | 176 |
| Raseborg | 170 |
| Kaarina | 147 |
| Kotka | 131 |
| Rovaniemi | 123 |
| Raisio | 121 |
| Kirkkonummi | 117 |
| Porvoo | 106 |
| Kouvola | 99 |
| Seinäjoki | 92 |
| Pirkkala | 82 |
| Järvenpää | 71 |
| Mikkeli | 70 |
| Kajaani | 67 |
| Hyvinkää | 66 |
| Lohja | 66 |
| Rauma | 63 |
| Forssa | 61 |
| Lieto | 61 |
| Joensuu | 59 |
| Nurmijärvi | 51 |
| Lempäälä | 50 |
| Kauniainen | 48 |
| Kokkola | 47 |
| Vihti | 44 |
| Kangasala | 43 |
| Raahe | 37 |
| Tuusula | 36 |
| Uusikaupunki | 35 |
| Nokia | 34 |
| Lappeenranta | 32 |
| Kemi | 30 |
| Naantali | 30 |
| Jakobstad | 30 |
| Tornio | 30 |
| Loimaa | 29 |
| Riihimäki | 29 |
| Jämsä | 25 |
| Pargas | 24 |
| Sipoo | 24 |
| Laitila | 23 |
| Hanko | 20 |
| Kuusamo | 17 |
| Heinola | 16 |
| Orimattila | 16 |
| Imatra | 15 |
| Nykarleby | 15 |
| Ylöjärvi | 15 |
| Loviisa | 14 |
| Rusko | 14 |
| Sastamala | 14 |
| Karkkila | 13 |
| Kristinestad | 13 |
| Lieksa | 13 |
| Kankaanpää | 12 |
| Akaa | 11 |
| Janakkala | 11 |
| Kittilä | 11 |
| Mariehamn | 11 |
| Savonlinna | 11 |
| Iisalmi | 10 |
| Kemijärvi | 10 |
| Muurame | 10 |
| Pudasjärvi | 10 |

People with Iraqi citizenship living in Finland according to Statistics Finland.

Citizens of Iraq by municipality (2024)
| Municipality | Population |
|---|---|
| Whole country | 13,993 |
| Helsinki | 4,045 |
| Vantaa | 2,320 |
| Espoo | 2,066 |
| Turku | 1,091 |
| Tampere | 629 |
| Lahti | 442 |
| Oulu | 321 |
| Vaasa | 201 |
| Salo | 167 |
| Jyväskylä | 165 |
| Kerava | 145 |
| Pori | 141 |
| Hämeenlinna | 118 |
| Kuopio | 110 |
| Rovaniemi | 110 |
| Raseborg | 102 |
| Seinäjoki | 80 |
| Kotka | 79 |
| Kirkkonummi | 75 |
| Porvoo | 74 |
| Kouvola | 73 |
| Mikkeli | 69 |
| Raisio | 62 |
| Joensuu | 49 |
| Järvenpää | 49 |
| Lohja | 48 |
| Rauma | 48 |
| Pirkkala | 47 |
| Kaarina | 46 |
| Forssa | 42 |
| Kajaani | 39 |
| Kauniainen | 37 |
| Vihti | 37 |
| Raahe | 36 |
| Hyvinkää | 35 |
| Nurmijärvi | 32 |
| Uusikaupunki | 29 |
| Jakobstad | 28 |
| Kokkola | 27 |
| Kemi | 26 |
| Kangasala | 22 |
| Loimaa | 21 |
| Jämsä | 19 |
| Laitila | 19 |
| Nokia | 19 |
| Lieto | 18 |
| Tuusula | 17 |
| Lappeenranta | 16 |
| Lempäälä | 16 |
| Nykarleby | 16 |
| Hanko | 15 |
| Kuusamo | 15 |
| Kemijärvi | 14 |
| Loviisa | 14 |
| Riihimäki | 14 |
| Tornio | 14 |
| Imatra | 13 |
| Kankaanpää | 13 |
| Kittilä | 12 |
| Kristinestad | 12 |
| Sastamala | 11 |
| Sipoo | 11 |
| Iisalmi | 10 |
| Janakkala | 10 |
| Naantali | 10 |
| Pargas | 10 |
| Ylöjärvi | 10 |

== Notable people ==
- Mohammad Al-Emara, football referee
- Hussein al-Taee, politician
- Asaad Abu Gilel al-Taie, politician
- Hassan Blasim, film director
- Arjan Goljahanpoor, footballer
- Dario Naamo, footballer

== See also ==
- Finland–Iraq relations
- Iraqi diaspora
- Immigration to Finland
