= Bulgaria–Iraq relations =

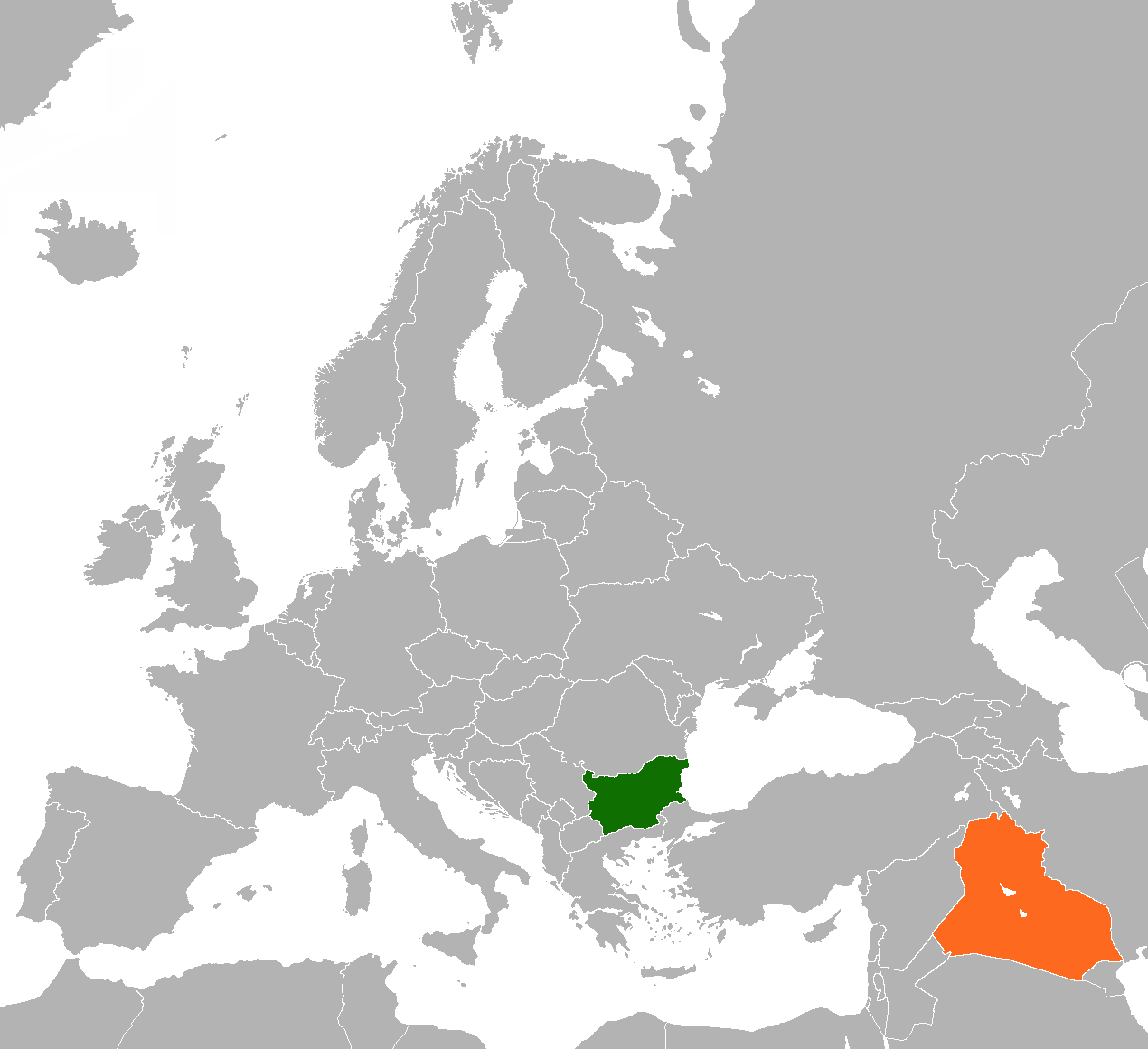

- Bulgaria: Iraq

Bulgaria–Iraq relations (Bulgarian: Отношения между България и Ирак, Arabic: العلاقات بين بلغاريا والعراق) are the international relations between Bulgaria and Iraq. Bulgaria has an embassy in Baghdad and Iraq has an embassy in Sofia.

From 1944 until 1989 in Bulgaria's case and 1968 until 2003 in Iraq's case, both countries were non-electoral single-party autocracies.

In the 1960s, Bulgarian workers and advisors were sent to Iraq. In the mid-1960s there was a community of about 500 Bulgarians in Baghdad.

Bulgaria was part of the Multinational force in Iraq between May 2003 and December 2008. Initially, Bulgarian troops were stationed in Al Diwaniyah and had many losses. Those troops were withdrawn in late 2005. Shortly afterwards, non-combat troops were stationed to guard the Camp Ashraf.

== Resident diplomatic missions ==
- Bulgaria has an embassy in Baghdad.
- Iraq has an embassy in Sofia.

== Notes ==
=== References ===
- Dimitrov, Martin K.; Sassoon, Joseph (2014). "State Security, Information, and Repression: A Comparison of Communist Bulgaria and Ba'thist Iraq". Journal of Cold War Studies. 16 (2): 3–31. doi:10.1162/JCWS_a_00448. S2CID 57560750.
- Filipova, Nadya (2021). "Bulgarian Temporary Labour Migration in Iraq during the 1960s and 1970s". Bulgarian Historical Review (1–2): 130–157.
- Kavalski, Emilian; Zolkos, Magdalena (2007). "The Hoax of War: The Foreign Policy Discourses of Poland and Bulgaria on Iraq, 2003–2005". Journal of Contemporary European Studies. 15 (3): 377–393. doi:10.1080/14782800701683763. S2CID 154003999.

== See also ==
- Foreign relations of Bulgaria
- Foreign relations of Iraq
- Iraq–European Union relations
- Bulgaria–Iran relations
