= Croatia–Iraq relations =

Bilateral relations between Croatia and Iraq

- Croatia: Iraq

Croatia–Iraq relations are the bilateral relations between Croatia and Iraq. The two countries established diplomatic relations on 4 January 2005 in New York. Prior to Croatia's independence, Iraq maintained relations with the Socialist Federal Republic of Yugoslavia, of which Croatia was a constituent republic. Iraq maintains an embassy in Zagreb, opened in October 2024. Croatia maintains an embassy in Baghdad.

== History ==
=== Yugoslavia era ===
Iraq established diplomatic relations with the Socialist Federal Republic of Yugoslavia in 1958. Yugoslav President Josip Broz Tito visited Iraq in August 1967. Croatia was a constituent republic of Yugoslavia until its declaration of independence in 1991, which was followed by the Croatian War of Independence.

=== Establishment of relations ===
Croatia and Iraq established diplomatic relations on 4 January 2005 in New York, through the signing of a Joint Statement on the Establishment of Diplomatic Relations.

In 2014, Croatian First Deputy Prime Minister and Minister of Foreign and European Affairs Vesna Pusic met with Iraqi Oil Minister Adil Abdul Mahdi in Baghdad.

== Military cooperation ==
=== Croatia–Kurdistan Region ===
In 2014, during the fight against the Islamic State, Croatia provided weapons to Kurdish forces in Iraq. The weapons were mostly of Yugoslav origin and included 20,000 pieces of HS Produkt VHS rifles. Croatian arms donated to the US government were also transferred to Iraqi forces and Kurdish troops fighting Islamic State insurgents.

=== VHS-2 in Iraqi government forces ===
The VHS-2 rifle, manufactured by Croatia's HS Produkt, has been adopted by Iraqi government forces, including the Iraqi Counter Terrorism Service, the Emergency Response Division, and the Iraqi Federal Police. Up to 30,000 VHS rifles are in service with the Iraqi Federal Police. The VHS-2 became one of the most frequently seen rifles during the Iraqi counter-offensives against ISIS. In 2024, Croatia exported US$18.1 million in weapons to Iraq.

=== Troop withdrawal ===
In January 2020, Croatia withdrew troops from Iraq amid escalating tensions following the Baghdad airstrike. Croatian President Zoran Milanović ordered the immediate withdrawal of seven Croatian soldiers from Iraq and one soldier from Lebanon.

== Economic cooperation ==
=== Construction and energy ===
Croatian companies are present in Iraq in the construction sector, energy, oil industry, and mine action. Croatia's Končar Group signed an agreement worth EUR 65 million (US$69 million) for a power plant contract in Iraq.

In 2014, Minister Pusic stated that Croatian food, energy, construction, IT, and pharmaceutical companies were ready to work in Iraq. Iraqi Foreign Minister Fuad Hussein later invited Croatian companies to participate in the reconstruction of the infrastructure of Iraqi cities.

=== Demining ===
Croatia offers expertise in demining and infrastructure rebuilding to Iraq, with companies such as DOK-ING, HS Produkt, and Končar. Croatia's own post-war demining experience is relevant to Iraq, as Croatia was declared mine-free in March 2026 after nearly 30 years of work, having cleared 1,835 km² of land containing 107,000 landmines and 407,000 unexploded ordnance.

=== Trade ===
Bilateral trade between Croatia and Iraq is limited. In 2024, Croatian imports from Iraq were valued at approximately US$534,900. Both countries participate in the broader EU–Iraq trade framework governed by the European Union–Iraq Partnership and Cooperation Agreement, signed in 2012 and entered into force in August 2018.

== Diplomatic engagement ==
=== 2024: First Iraqi foreign minister visit to Croatia ===
In October 2024, Iraqi Foreign Minister Fuad Hussein paid an official visit to Croatia from 21 to 23 October, marking the first-ever visit of an Iraqi foreign minister to Croatia in the history of diplomatic relations. During the visit, Hussein officially opened the Embassy of the Republic of Iraq in Zagreb. He met with Croatian Foreign Minister Gordan Grlić Radman, Croatian Minister of Economy Ante Šušnjar, and the President of Croatia.

On 22 October 2024, Iraq and Croatia signed a Memorandum of Understanding on Political Consultations, aimed at enhancing bilateral cooperation and intensifying political coordination between the two countries. During the signing ceremony, the two Ministers affirmed the keenness of Iraq and Croatia to expand bilateral relations across various fields.

=== 2025: Croatian foreign minister visit to Baghdad ===
On 25–26 October 2025, Croatian Foreign Minister Gordan Grlić Radman paid an official visit to Iraq at the invitation of Iraqi Foreign Minister Fuad Hussein. During the visit, Grlić Radman met with Iraqi President Abdul Latif Rashid, Iraqi Prime Minister, and Iraqi Foreign Minister Fuad Hussein.

The discussions focused on enhancing cooperation in political, economic, and cultural fields, including energy, agriculture, tourism, and mine clearance. Croatia offered its expertise in demining and infrastructure, noting that Croatia and Iraq share the experience of post-war reconstruction. The two sides also discussed the role of Croatian companies operating in Iraq, especially in the electricity sector. Grlić Radman flagged prospects in oil, gas, energy, and armaments, while Hussein said discussions also covered Iraq's ties with the European Union.

Croatia affirmed its support for the unity and sovereignty of Iraq and its stability.

== Humanitarian aid ==
Croatia has maintained a long-standing humanitarian engagement in Iraq, including mine-awareness education for children.

== Migration ==
During the 2015 European migrant crisis, Iraq was the third country of citizenship of asylum seekers in the EU, with 121,500 first-time applicants. Croatia, located on the Western Balkan migration route, received a significant number of migrants and asylum seekers, many of whom were Iraqi nationals. Iraq has been among the countries of origin for refugees and asylum seekers in Croatia.

== Iraqi diaspora in Croatia ==
The Embassy of the Republic of Iraq in Zagreb organized the first gathering of the Iraqi community in Croatia at the Sheraton Zagreb Hotel.

== Resident diplomatic missions ==
- Iraq has an embassy in Zagreb, located at Tuškanac 20, opened on 21 October 2024.
- Croatia has an embassy in Baghdad, located at Al Jadryah, Quarter 913, Street 45, House 14.

== See also ==
- Foreign relations of Croatia
- Foreign relations of Iraq
- Croatia–Kurdistan Region relations
- Iraq–Yugoslavia relations
- Breakup of Yugoslavia
- HS Produkt VHS
