= NATO Training Mission – Iraq =

Training mission

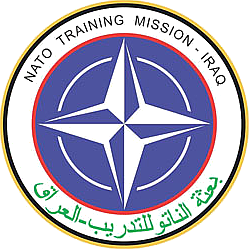
The crest of the NATO Training Mission-Iraq

The NATO Training Mission-Iraq (NTM-I) was a military training and advisory mission. It was under the control of NATO's North Atlantic Council. It was established in 2004 at the request of the then-unelected Iraqi Interim Government under the provisions of UN Security Council Resolution 1546. The aim of NTM-I was to assist Iraqi security forces’ training structures and institutions so that the Iraqi Interim Government could build an effective and sustainable capability. Its operational emphasis was on training and mentoring. The activities of the mission were coordinated with Iraqi authorities and United States Forces – Iraq, who was also dual-hatted as the Commander of NTM-I. The mission ended in December 2011 and was succeeded by NATO Mission Iraq (NM-I) in October 2018.

== Activity ==
NTM-I delivered training, advice and mentoring support in three main areas:

- Support to the Iraqi command and control structure.
- Iraqi Armed Forces Officers training and education and the professional development at the non-commissioned officer Academy both within Iraq and abroad. Complementing institutional education is the NTM-I role in developing Iraqi doctrine. Over 1800 members of the Iraqi security forces also attended NATO out-of-country specialized training from 2004 to 2011.
- Italian Carabinieri-led training of the Iraqi Police.

The challenge for NTM-I was to transition from being a training provider to becoming a mentor of trainers. 2010 was a significant year in Iraq, as the United States continued to withdraw their combat forces, and the Iraqi Armed Forces and Ministry of Interior took on further security responsibilities. The main activities during transition were the standardisation of Iraqi Officer Education and Training (OET), the training of the Iraqi Federal Police, and the assistance to the Directorate of Border Security.

Through its activities NTM-I helped pave the way for a long-term relationship between the Alliance and Iraq under a Structured Cooperation Framework.

NTM-I operated in four different areas:

- The NTM-I Headquarters was located at Forward Operating Base Union III in the Green Zone of Baghdad. NATO staff traveled to different locations within the Green Zone to provide training, advising and mentoring.
- The NTM-I Forward base at the Iraqi Military Academy Rustamiyah, some 15 km south east of Baghdad, supported the Iraqi Military Academy and the Joint Staff College, as well as the Base Defence Battalion that maintained security at Rustamiyah.
- NTM-I activities at Camp Taji (Taji Air Base), 27 km north west of Baghdad, supported the training of the Iraqi Senior Non-Commissioned Officer courses and the Battle Staff Training.
- The fourth location was Camp Dublin, located south of Baghdad International Airport. This is where the Italian Carabinieri Training Unit trained the Iraqi Federal Police.

23 NATO member countries and one partner country contributed directly to the training effort through the provision of personnel, funding or equipment donations. The NTM-I footprint was a small tactical force of around 170 NATO/Partnership for Peace personnel, representing 13 member nations (as at August 2010).

== Primary NATO Contributions ==
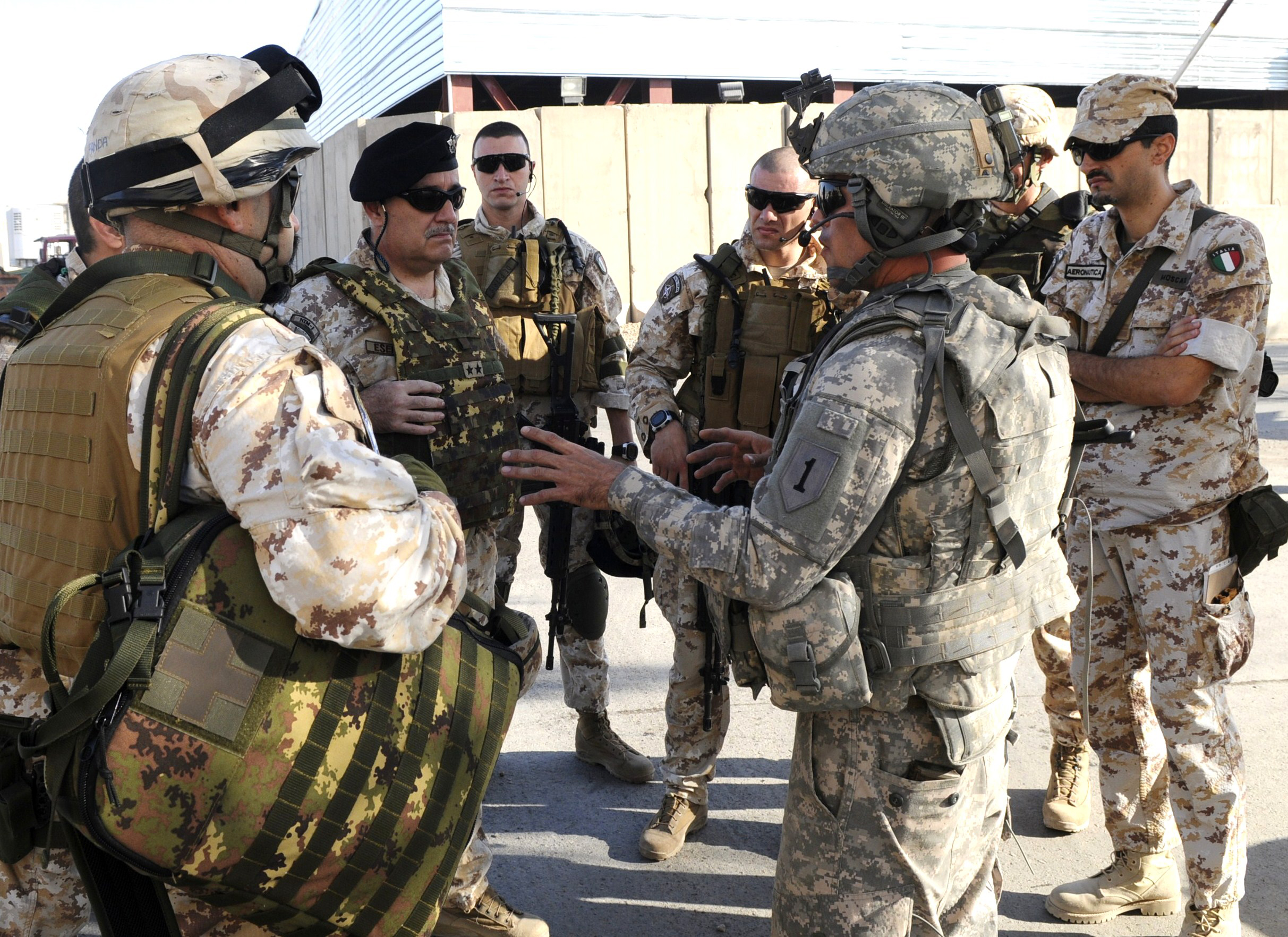
Italian Major General Giovanni Armentani, Deputy Commanding General for the NATO Training Mission, meets with a U.S. Advise and Assist Brigade in 2011

- United States – 60 instructors and a protection company in addition to airlift support and logistics.
- Italy – In July 2010, the Italian Army deployed 90 soldiers to Iraq under NTM-I, with a team of about 60 Carabinieri. A senior officer of the Italian Navy served as the Advisor of the Commander of Naval Forces in Iraq.
- Denmark – A contingent of Danish troops deployed to train Iraqi forces under NTM-I, numbering 10 trainers and seven soldiers for force protection in September 2007.
- Netherlands – 10 military police and 15 trainers deployed to Iraq in September 2007
- United Kingdom – The UK deployed 11 soldiers to Iraq under NTM-I.
- Croatia – Croatian contingent of 14 soldiers were sent to Iraq in support of NATO's military advisor and training programs.
- Turkey – As of September 2007, 2 Turkish soldiers served in Baghdad.
- Romania – As of September 2007, there were 2 instructors in Iraq, while the deployment of 5 more was a possibility.
- Lithuania – 3 Lithuanian trainers deployed to Iraq in September 2007.
- Estonia – Three officers as of October 2008.
- Poland – One officer deployed under NTM-I in September 2008.
- Portugal – Portuguese Army contributed from February 2005 until the end of NTM-I mission usually with six officers and two NCOs.
- Bulgaria – In October 2006, the Bulgarian government sent 4 officers.
- Albania - As of September 2009, the Albanian government sent 1 officer and 1 NCO with rotation bases, as part of NTM-I in Baghdad.

== Withdrawn ==
- Czech Republic – Four soldiers deployed under NTM-I in December 2008
- Iceland – A 'public information officer' was withdrawn in September 2007.
- Slovakia – 5 instructors were withdrawn in April 2007.
- Slovenia – Sent 4 trainers to Iraq in 2006, these men have since been withdrawn.
- Norway – 10 trainers were withdrawn in September 2007.
- Hungary – There were 3 Hungarian soldiers serving under NTM-I as of November, 2008.

== Other NATO Contributions ==
- Germany, Japan, United Arab Emirates – Jointly conducted a training programme for Iraqi police officers in the UAE from December 2003. Germany also trained Iraqi logistics troops in a separate UAE-based mission as of December 2004. Belgium offered 10 instructors to the latter programme.
- Canada, France – Separately offered to conduct training outside Iraq; the former did not specify where, while the latter suggested Qatar.
- Hungary – Donated second-hand tanks to the Iraqi Army.
- Poland, Bulgaria, Spain, Norway, Germany – Each hosted domestic training programmes for Iraqi security forces. Latvia, Lithuania and Turkey offered to host similar programmes.
- Canada, Germany, Spain, United States – Each contributed over $500,000 in cash to a mission trust fund.

== Non-NATO Contributions ==
- Jordan – Although not a NATO member, Jordan's contribution was by far the most extensive, having graduated 50,000 Iraqi police officers by February 2007, plus smaller numbers of Iraqi Army soldiers and Air Force personnel. Jordan also donated a substantial number of tanks.
- Egypt – Invited an Iraqi Army company to participate in joint military training in 2004.
- Ukraine – since December 2006, when 8 officers were sent to Iraq. There were 8 officers in January 2010, and all withdrew by December 2011.

== See also ==
- NATO Mission Iraq
- Multi-National Force – Iraq
