= Iraqi diaspora =

Iraqi people living outside of Iraq

Countries with a significant population of Iraqis and their descendants. Iraq ≥1,000,000 ≥100,000 ≥10,000 ≥1,000

The Iraqi diaspora refers to native Iraqis who have left for other countries as emigrants or refugees, and is now one of the largest in modern times, being described by the UN as a "humanitarian crisis" caused by the 1991 Gulf War and 2003 invasion of Iraq and by the ensuing war.

The diaspora is formed of various ethnic and religious groups from Iraq, including: Sunni and Shia Arabs, Kurds, Turkmens, and Circassians, Yazidis, Christians (such as Assyrians and Armenians), and Jews.

== History ==
The Iraqi diaspora is not a sudden exodus but one that has grown exponentially through the 20th century as each generation faced some form of radical transition or political conflict. There were at least two large waves of expatriation. A great number of Iraqis left the country during the dictatorship of Saddam Hussein, and large numbers have left during the Iraq War and its aftermath.

Various ethnic and religious populations have also been displaced or relocated. Assyrians, for example, have dealt with a century long dispersion of its people as a result of persecution and massacre. Another ethnic group are the Mandeans, who numbered around 70,000 before the current war. Now, the last practising Gnostic sect in the Middle East has almost entirely left Iraq.

During the first Gulf War, Iran provided refuge for 1.4 million Iraqis, though many did not settle there permanently. Facing international pressure, the United States agreed to allow Iraqis in the Rafha refugee camp in Saudi Arabia to resettle in America. Through 2002, over 32,000 Iraqi refugees had been resettled in the United States; they joined a population of non-refugee Iraqis in America, bringing the total to over 400,000 Iraqis in the US, most notably in Detroit, Chicago, San Diego and Phoenix.

The history of emigration and of the diaspora community then drastically changed with the 2003 invasion of Iraq. There are many sources claiming different amounts of displaced Iraqis. Some claim as low as 1.2 million people have left Iraq, while others claim this number to be around 4–5 million. It is difficult to gauge an accurate number of how many Iraqis seek refuge in other nations because of the constant outflow of Iraqis.

According to "UN statistics on displaced Iraqis around the world" of September 2007, Syria and Jordan are absorbing 44 per cent of displaced Iraqis globally. Other countries have also received Iraqis. Egypt, which has pledged to end Iraqi immigration, already has 150,000 Iraqi people. The United Kingdom, whose Iraqi population comes largely if not entirely from before the 2003 Iraq War, has a population numbering between 250,000 and half a million. Iran also has approximately 204,000 Iraqi expatriates. And, in Lebanon, 100,000 refugees have settled. Sweden has allowed 18,000 refugees to enter, by far the most of any European country, but has indicated that it too plans on tightening restrictions.

== Population by country ==
Country	Capital	Centres of Iraqi population	No. of Iraqis	Further info
Iraq	Baghdad	Entire Country	46,500,000	Iraqis
United States	Washington, D.C.	Detroit, Chicago, San Diego, Phoenix, Nashville	160,598	Iraqi Americans & Iraqis in USA
Israel	Jerusalem	Jerusalem, Ramat Gan	600,000	Iraqi Jews in Israel
Iran	Tehran	Tehran, Qom, Ahvaz, Ilam, Shiraz, Mashhad	500,000	Iraqis in Iran
Germany	Berlin	Munich, Berlin, Cologne	455,000	Iraqis in Germany
United Kingdom	London	London, Birmingham, Manchester, Leeds, Derby, Cardiff and Glasgow.	93,285	Iraqis in the United Kingdom
Sweden	Stockholm	Stockholm (Södertälje), Malmö	146,000	Iraqis in Sweden
Jordan	Amman	Amman	130,000	Iraqis in Jordan
United Arab Emirates	Abu Dhabi		100,000	Iraqis in the United Arab Emirates
Canada	Ottawa	Mississauga, Toronto, Windsor, Ontario	84,130	Iraqi Canadians and Iraqis in Canada
Australia	Canberra	Perth, Sydney, Melbourne, Victoria (Australia)	80,000-130.000	Iraqis in Australia
Turkey	Ankara	Ankara, Istanbul, Konya, Trabzon, Bodrum	50,000-115,000	Iraqis in Turkey
Lebanon	Beirut	Beirut, Roumieh, Baalbeck, Beqaa, Nabatiyeh, Baabda, Aley, Matn, Tyre, Sidon, Hermel, Zahlé, Bint Jbeil, Chouf, Byblos, Tripoli, Koura	50,000	Iraqis in Lebanon
Finland	Helsinki	Greater Helsinki, Tampere, Turku	33,000	Iraqis in Finland
Denmark	Copenhagen	Metropolitan Copenhagen, Aarhus, Aalborg	33,000	Iraqis in Denmark
Norway	Oslo	Oslo, Bergen, Stavanger, Bærum, Trondheim, Drammen, Kristiansand, Fredrikstad, Asker	29,000	Iraqis in Norway
Egypt	Cairo	Cairo, Alexandria	20,000-70,000	
Kuwait	Kuwait City		20,000	
Algeria	Algiers		20,000	
Belgium	Brussels		10,000-13,000	
Qatar	Doha		6,100	
New Zealand	Wellington	Auckland, Wellington, Christchurch	6,000+ (2006 Census)	Iraqis in New Zealand
Greece	Athens		5,000-40,000	Iraqis in Greece

== Locations ==
The following countries have hosted Iraqi refugees. This list is by no means conclusive.

== Americas ==
=== United States ===
There are about 200,000 Iraqis or Americans of Iraqi descent. According to the Arab American Institute, the Iraqi population in the USA is 350,000–400,000 and the hub of Iraqi Americans is in Chicago. Since 2000, more than 33,000 have gained legal entry to the United States.

=== Canada ===
An estimate of over 50,000 Iraqis live in Canada.

=== Puerto Rico ===
25,000 Iraqis, either permanent residents or refugees awaiting entry to the United States, live in the Commonwealth of Puerto Rico.

=== Brazil ===
Approximately 340,000 Iraqi refugees have emigrated to Brazil, where there's already a large Arab population. Although not all of the refugees are Arabs. Some of the refugees include Palestinians in Iraq who were originally displaced from their homes in 1948 when Israel was created and then were forced to leave again in the 2000s due to the Iraq War.

=== Argentina ===
Approximately 120,000 Iraqis live in Argentina, including around 72,000 refugees, followed by even more Syrian refugees fleeing the Syrian Civil War (2011–), and they settle in Argentina's Arab communities.

== Europe ==
=== Austria ===
The total Austrian population of Iraqi refugees is 5,559

=== Finland ===
According to the UN, there are 32,778 Iraqis in Finland.

=== France ===
The current population of Iraqis in France is estimated at 8,200. However, it has been reported that since the invasion of Iraq, France has only accepted 13 refugees.

Some reports claim that there are 1,300 Iraqi refugees living in France.

=== Germany ===
The number of Iraqis in Germany is estimated at 150,000 In 2006, out of 2,727 asylum applications for Iraqi refugees, only 8.3 percent were accepted. Some sources claim there to be just around 40,000 Iraqi refugees residing in Germany. In 2006, Germany granted just 8.3 percent of Iraqi asylum demands, according to the ministry.

=== Greece ===
Over 80,000 Iraqi refugees are believed to have come into Greece since 2003. The Greek government wants to resettle most of the refugees, though some refugees are using Greece as a path of entry to other European countries. Greece has long attracted Iraqis and other Arabic-speaking peoples from the Middle East for centuries during Ottoman Turkish times (the late 16th to early 20th centuries) and in the 2000s, many Iraqi and Syrian workers are thought to have arrived from Cyprus to find jobs in Greece.

=== Hungary ===
Approximately 1,200 Iraqi refugees have immigrated to Hungary.

=== Ireland ===
Sources claim there to be 340 Iraqi refugees living in Ireland.

=== Italy ===
The current population of Iraqis in Italy stands at around 6,035, in addition almost 800 Iraqis have acquires Italian citizenship between 2008 and 2020 and are now Italian citizens.

However one source claims there to be 56,300, which is approximately 50 families. Most of these are priests, nuns and seminarians who have come to pursue their studies in Italy. The majority are residents of Rome.

There have been recent appeals from the Iraqi community living in Italy to free any Italian and Iraqi Italian residents currently working in Iraq.

In November 2007, 1,800 Iraqi Kurds sought refugee in Italy, of which only 20 of them applied for asylum and the other received 15-day expulsion orders.

=== Portugal ===
Sources claim there are currently almost 600 Iraqi living in Portugal as of 2021, the majority being refugees. In addition, 49 Iraqis have acquired Portuguese citizenship in recent years

=== Romania ===
Sources claim there are at least 450 Iraqi refugees living in Romania as of 2007.

=== Russia ===
Significant groups of Iraqis have emigrated to Russia as early as the 1990s. Iran credits Russia with being one of the first countries to provide concrete assistance in processing Iraqi refugees; Russia's Emergency Situations Ministry began preparing two sites for refugee camps in western Iran in April 2003. However, Iraqis admitted to Russia often find themselves the targets of racism; as with Afghan refugees, they are mistaken for migrants from the Caucasus, who are stereotyped in Russia as drug dealers and criminals. The number of Iraqi refugees in Russia is unknown, but may exceed 50,000 in the year 2009. Iraqi Christians like Assyrians migrated to Russia in the early 20th century.

=== Spain ===
The current population of Iraqis in Spain are unknown; however, since the Iraq War, Spain has been host to 45 Iraqi refugees. An additional 42 Iraqis requested asylum in 2006. There are roughly about 13,700 asylum seekers in Spain, and a further 642 Iraqis hold residency permits.

Iraqi immigration to Spain accounted for 1,706 permanent residents in the year 2006.

=== Sweden ===
Iraqis in Sweden numbered over 135,000, are one of the largest ethnic groups living in Sweden as of 2005, second to Swedes and Finns. The mass influx of Iraqi refugees has increased dramatically during the last years, with up to 40,000 Iraqis expected to seek asylum in 2007. Some sources claim there to be around 80,000 Iraqis living in Sweden with Swedish citizenship, along with hundreds of new applications for asylum from Iraqis every month.

=== Switzerland ===
The current population of Iraqis in Switzerland is estimated to be around 5,000. However, the Swiss government is currently closing doors to future Iraqi refugees, and offering to send external aid instead. Christoph Blocher, the Swiss Justice and Police Minister, stated that "We already have 5,000 Iraqis in Switzerland and our country is in second place in Europe in accepting them".

=== United Kingdom ===
The United Kingdom has the largest Iraqi community in the Western World with estimates ranging from 250,000 to 450,000.

== Kuwait ==
The current Iraqi population in Kuwait is difficult to determine, as there are no official figures. In 2018, it was estimated that 16,000 to 20,000 Iraqi citizens reside in Kuwait. Estimates in 2006 ranged from 10,000 to 13,000. According to the UNHCR, only 427 Iraqis have been registered as asylum seekers and 18 Iraqis have been recognized as refugees in Kuwait.

Due to the historic Iraqi–Kuwaiti wars, Kuwait had previously announced that it will not provide shelter for Iraqi refugees and will prevent them from entering the country by guarding the border with Saudi Arabian troops. However, Kuwait did announce that they will hold any refugees in a 15 kilometer-wide demilitarized strip on the Iraqi side of the border, where it would provide humanitarian assistance.

Kuwait has maintained strict regulations when considering refugees; however, the country hosted 15,000 Iraqis throughout the 1990s, most of which have resided in Kuwait. In 2007, the country sheltered 13,000 Iraqi refugees according to the UNHCR.

== Turkey ==
The UNHCR reported that more than 81,000 refugees from Iraq and Afghanistan have arrived to Turkey in 2014. Most of the Iraqi refugees had to flee their cities due to the ISIS attacks.

== Qatar ==
The current population of Iraqis in Qatar stood at 8,976 as of 2014, according to the Iraqi embassy in Doha.

== United Arab Emirates ==
The current population of Iraqis in the United Arab Emirates is estimated to be around 100,000.

== Yemen ==
Since the war in 2003, despite not sharing a border with Iraq, Yemen has become a host country for many Iraqi refugees. However, in 2004, the Yemeni government has changed its policy and currently requires Iraqi nationals to hold visas before letting them into Yemen; this has restricted their entry into the country. It is difficult to estimate how many Iraqis are in Yemen, as the numbers vary frequently, with many arriving and leaving quickly. In 2004, the UNHCR estimated that 100,000 Iraqis were living in Yemen.

== See also ==
- Iraqi people
- Assyrian diaspora
- List of Iraqis
- List of Iraqi Americans
- List of Iraqi Britons
- Refugees of Iraq
- Iraqi conflict (2003–present)
