= Iraq–Slovakia relations =

- Iraq: Slovakia

Iraq–Slovakia relations are the bilateral relations between Iraq and Slovakia. Modern ties are a continuation of relations between Iraq and Czechoslovakia, which lasted until 1993. During the Cold War, Czechoslovakia was a major supplier of military equipment and a significant trade partner to Iraq. In the 21st century, bilateral cooperation has centered on humanitarian aid, development grants, and military training. Iraq maintains an embassy in Bratislava, while Slovakia operates an embassy in Baghdad and a consulate general in Erbil.

== History ==
=== Czechoslovak era (1945–1993) ===
Before the 1993 dissolution of Czechoslovakia, the government in Prague maintained extensive trade and military ties with Baghdad. Czechoslovakia supplied arms to Iraq before World War II, and later became one of the largest Soviet Bloc arms exporters to the country during the Cold War. During the Iran–Iraq War in the 1980s, Czechoslovakia exported industrial military equipment to Iraq, including a forge for ammunition production, and offered to license the production of L-39 trainer aircraft.

=== Modern relations (1993–present) ===
Following its independence in 1993, Slovakia established its own foreign policy toward the Middle East. During the 2003 invasion of Iraq, the country joined the US-led coalition. On 19 June 2003, the National Council of the Slovak Republic approved the deployment of an engineer unit to participate in Operation Iraqi Freedom. The Slovak contingent operated within the Polish-led stabilization forces between Baghdad and Basra, focusing on de-mining operations and training local Iraqi police. Slovak troops remained in Iraq until 2007. The government later approved a smaller deployment of 25 soldiers to continue security training efforts.

In May 2014, Slovak Foreign Minister Miroslav Lajčák met with Kurdish Foreign Minister Falah Mustafa Bakir at the Globsec forum in Bratislava. Lajčák stated that Slovakia views relations with Iraq, including the Kurdistan Region, as "highly prospective," emphasizing the importance of trade and commerce. During the conflict with the Islamic State (ISIS), Slovakia provided military hardware to Kurdish Peshmerga forces.

In 2025, Iraq's Ambassador to Slovakia met with Rastislav Chovanec, the Slovak State Secretary of the Ministry of Foreign and European Affairs, to discuss bilateral relations. Chovanec noted the potential for increased economic cooperation and referenced the historical trade links between the two nations.

== Humanitarian and development cooperation ==
Iraq has been a primary recipient of Slovak humanitarian aid. Slovakia has contributed to post-conflict stabilization and mine clearance efforts. In April 2022, Slovakia joined the Czech Republic and Estonia in contributing over $334,041 to humanitarian mine action initiatives in Iraq.

The Slovak Agency for International Development Cooperation (SlovakAid) periodically offers small development grants for projects in Iraq and Lebanon. The Slovak government also provides state scholarships for Iraqi students to study at Slovak universities.

== Economic relations ==
Bilateral trade between Iraq and Slovakia remains relatively low. Because there are no preferential trade agreements between the two countries, Iraqi exports to Slovakia are subject to standard European Union tariffs. In the first quarter of 2018, Slovak exports to Iraq were valued at approximately $535,000.

== Diplomatic missions ==
- Iraq has an embassy in Bratislava.
- Slovakia has an embassy in Baghdad, and a consulate in Erbil.
- The Embassy of the Slovak Republic in Beirut, Lebanon, is also accredited to Iraq.

== See also ==
- Foreign relations of Iraq
- Foreign relations of Slovakia
- Czech Republic–Iraq relations
