= Finland–Iraq relations =

- Finland: Iraq

Finland–Iraq relations are bilateral relations between Finland and Iraq. Finland has an embassy in Baghdad. Iraq has an embassy in Helsinki. Both countries established diplomatic relations on 15 May 1959. Both nations are full members of United Nations.

== Diaspora ==
=== Iraqis in Finland ===
Iraqis in Finland are people who have a background from the country of Iraq and who live in Finland. People can be born in Iraq, have Iraqi ancestry and/or be citizens of Iraq. As of 2024, there were 23,120 people born in Iraq living in Finland. Similarly, the number of people with Iraqi citizenship was 13,993. Most Iraqis in Finland have come as refugees. Of the 32,000 people who sought asylum in Finland in 2015, 21,000 were Iraqis, or two-thirds of all asylum seekers.

== Resident diplomatic missions ==
- Finland has an embassy in Baghdad.
- Iraq has an embassy in Helsinki.
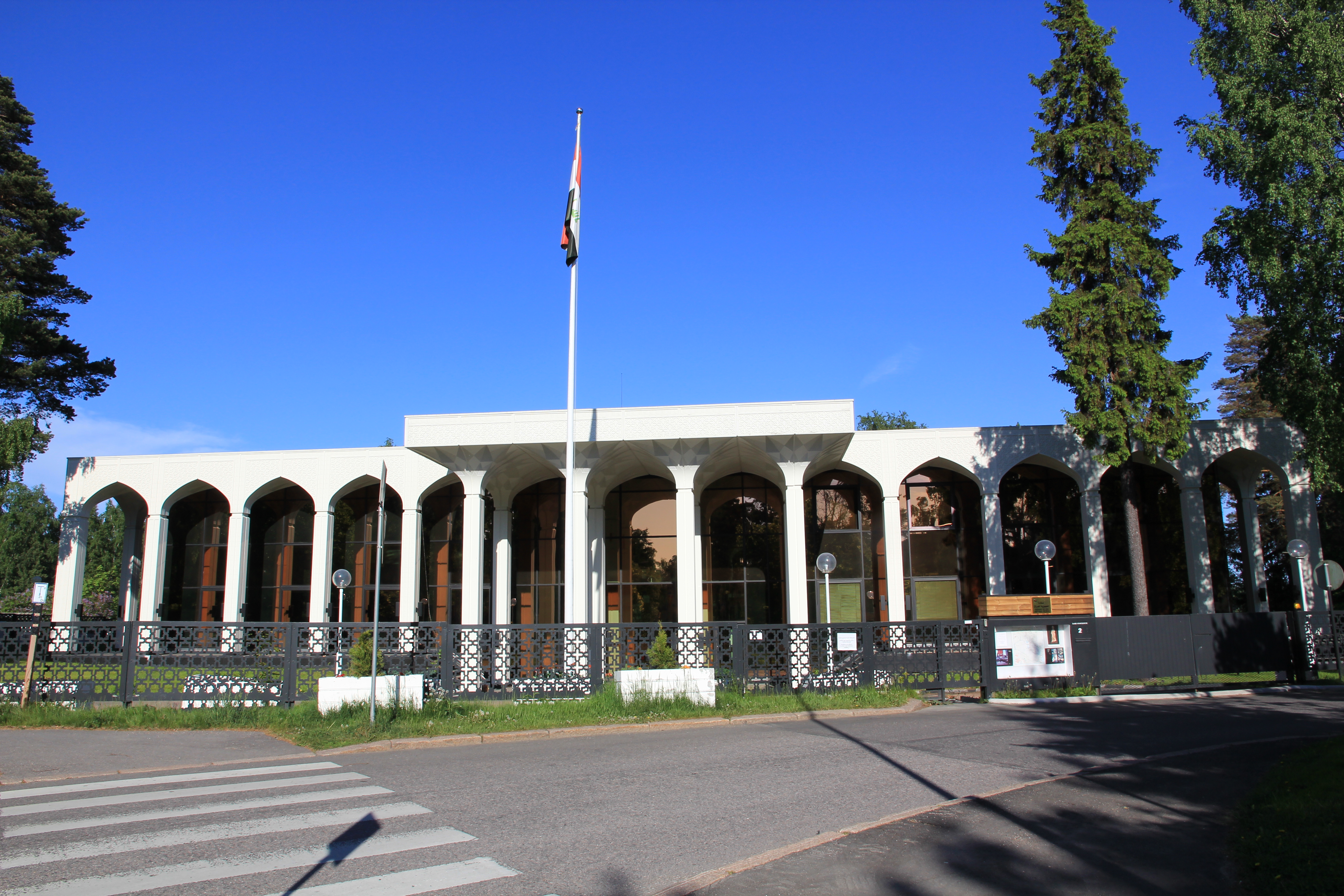
Embassy of Iraq in Helsinki

== See also ==
- Foreign relations of Finland
- Foreign relations of Iraq
