= Iraqi diaspora in Europe =

There have been many waves of refugees and emigrants from Iraq since the late 1970s until the present. Major events the modern history of Iraq resulted in the flight of what are now millions of Iraqis: more than three decades of repression and occasional violent attacks and massacres against the Kurdish population in the north and the Shi'a in the south perpetrated by Saddam Hussein's regime, the Iran–Iraq War of 1980–1988, the 1991 Gulf War, the economic sanctions that lasted from 1991 until the toppling of Saddam Hussein, and the 2003 US-led invasion of Iraq.

Europe has hosted an important population of Iraqi exiles since the 1980s with the outbreak of the Iran–Iraq War. In particular, the Iraqi diaspora has had a strong presence in the UK, Sweden, Norway and the Netherlands (which has hosted refugees since the 1991 Gulf War). Nevertheless, Europe's performance in addressing the refugee crisis that resulted from the US-led invasion of Iraq has been widely criticized by the UNHCR, which denounced the small number of asylum applicants accepted by the EU. By the end of 2008, only 10 per cent of the Iraqi refugees resettled by the UNHCR were hosted by EU countries, mainly Sweden and the Netherlands.

In 2007 while the sectarian violence intensified in Iraq after the Al-Askari mosque bombing , the UN called on western nations to accept more Iraqi refugees. After 18 months of pressure by the UNHCR, the EU reached a (non-binding) agreement in November 2008 for accepting up to 10,000 Iraqi refugees, giving special treatment to those living in extreme conditions in Syria and Jordan. Unpleasant living and working conditions for Iraqi refugees in Jordan continued to trigger further migration to Europe.

== Background ==
Over a period of decades significant numbers of displaced persons have fled Iraq as refugees. This intensified after the 2006 al-Askari mosque bombing in the city of Samarra. In 2003 as a result of the Iraq War the UNHCR adopted the position that every asylum-seeker from the central and southern regions of Iraq should be granted refugee status.

By 2008, the continuous violence in Iraq had displaced a total of 4.7 million people: 2.7 million were internally displaced persons (IDPs), and the remaining 2 million fled the country in search of refuge. Iraqis became the third largest refugee population after the Afghans and the Palestinians. According to some estimates, over 15 per cent of Iraq's population had been displaced.

=== UNHCR position ===
Many European countries did not follow UNHCR's 2003 guidelines and argued that the post-war situation in these areas of Iraq was not enough for qualifying Iraqis as refugees. These discrepancies about the violence in Iraq—which had important political connotations, especially for those countries that participated in the invasion—and whether Iraqis should be eligible for protection enabled some countries not only to reject asylum applications, but also to repatriate asylum-seekers back to Iraq. The UNHCR repeatedly condemned the UK, Sweden, the Netherlands and Norway, among other European countries, for forcibly repatriating Iraqis when the situation back in their homeland is still not safe for them. UNHCR's spokesman in Geneva, Adrian Edwards, said in September 2010 that "[w]e strongly urge European governments to provide Iraqis with protection until the situation in their areas of origin in Iraq allows for safe and voluntary returns. In this critical time of transition, we also encourage all efforts to develop conditions in Iraq that are conducive to sustainable and voluntary return".

=== European Union policy ===
The EU does not have a unified system towards asylum-seekers. In 2000 Brussels announced the establishment of a Common European Asylum System that, however, has not been fully applied. A UNHCR research paper, "Fortress Europe and the Iraqi 'intruders': Iraqi asylum-seekers and the EU, 2003–2007," points out that the only commonality among EU countries lies on their efforts for preventing refugees from reaching their territory in the first place. First, the EU does not accept the 'S' series passport—the most common one in Iraq—, but require the 'G' series one, which are only issued in one office situated in Baghdad. Second, if the valid series of passport is obtained, the step is obtaining a visa, a process that is "virtually impossible". Third neither coalition troops based in Iraq nor embassies in Iraq accept petitions for asylum. Therefore, Iraqis who want to reach Europe are left with two options. They can either access the UN resettlement program by arriving to Damascus or Amman and wait indefinitely for being resettled; or they can try to reach Europe illegally. The majority of Iraqis that enter the EU illegally do so through Greece, either by land crossing the Greco-Turkish border, or by reaching one of the numerous Greek islands by sea. Once in Greece, the majority travels to northern European countries and applies for refugee status from there. The estimated cost of this second and illegal option is around $10,000, an expensive alternative that only those with financial means can afford. In addition to the UNHCR, the European Council on Refugees and Exiles along with human rights groups have denounced the EU's strict policies, which force many Iraqis to undertake long, dangerous and expensive journeys in order to find refuge in Europe. These tough policies executed by the EU result in a small number of asylum petitions: out of the many hundreds of thousands of Iraqis who sought resettlement in third countries from 2003 to 2007, only 60,000 had applied for asylum in the EU.

== Current number of Iraqis in all countries ==
Rank	Country	Capital	Centres of Iraqi population	No. of Iraqis	Further info
1	Germany	Berlin	Berlin, Cologne, Hamburg	450,000	Iraqis in Germany
2	United Kingdom	London	London, Birmingham, Manchester, Leeds, Derby, Cardiff and Glasgow.	250,000	Iraqis in the United Kingdom
4	Sweden	Stockholm	Stockholm (Södertälje), Malmö	135,129	Iraqis in Sweden
5	Netherlands	Amsterdam	Amsterdam, The Hague, Utrecht	43,000 (0.3%)	Iraqis in the Netherlands
6	Finland	Helsinki	Helsinki, Tampere, Turku, Espoo, Vantaa	32,778 (0.6%)	Iraqis in Finland
7	Greece	Athens	Athens	5,000–40,000	Iraqis in Greece
8	Norway	Oslo	Oslo, Bergen, Stavanger, Bærum, Trondheim, Drammen, Kristiansand, Fredrikstad, Asker	30,144 (2014)	Iraqis in Norway
9	Denmark	Copenhagen	Copenhagen	12,000	Iraqis in Denmark
10	Belgium	Brussels	Brussels, Antwerp, Liège, Leuven	10,000-15,000	Iraqis in Belgium
11	Austria	Vienna	Vienna	5,000–10,000	Iraqis in Austria
12	Italy	Rome	Lazio, Trentino-Alto Adige, Calabria	6,043	Iraqis in Italy

== Present-day Iraqi diaspora communities in Europe ==
=== Austria ===
The total Austrian population of Iraqi refugees is around 10,897

=== Belgium ===
The total Belgium population of Iraqi refugees is around 13,000.

=== Bulgaria ===
The total Bulgarian population of Iraqi refugees is around 1,200.

=== Denmark ===
Denmark has been a strong host nation to Iraqi refugees, where there are approximately 12,000. Kurdish Iraqis are one of the largest Iraqi ethnic groups living in Denmark. This is partially due to the large number of Kurds who have emigrated from northern Iraq.

=== Finland ===
The number of Iraqis in Finland is 32,778, which is the fourth largest in Europe, after Sweden, Germany and the UK.

=== France ===
The current population of Iraqis in France is estimated at 8,200.

Some reports claim that there are 1,300 Iraqi refugees living in France.

=== Germany ===
The number of Iraqis in Germany is estimated at 150,000. In 2006, out of 2,727 asylum applications for Iraqi refugees, only 8.3 percent were accepted. Some sources claim there to be just around 40,000 Iraqi refugees residing in Germany. In 2006, Germany granted just 8.3 percent of Iraqi asylum demands, according to the ministry.

In 2006, Germany received 2,117 applications for asylum from Iraqis, which is the third highest number in the EU. The country is already home to a sizeable Iraqi population, many of whom were granted protection by the German authorities after fleeing persecution from Saddam Hussein's former regime. However, the recognition rate for Iraqis has fallen from an average of 57 per cent between 1997 and 2001, to a mere 11 per cent for the year 2006, which is one of the lowest in the European Union.

However, Germany has adopted another policy towards Iraqi refugees which has distinguished it from all other EU states, the German Federal Ministry of the Interior and Community has taken the unique step of systematically revoking the refugee status of thousands of Iraqis who were granted protection before 2003. Since the threat of persecution from the Iraqi Ba'ath regime is no longer present, 18,000 Iraqi refugees who entered the country before the 2003 invasion have thus had their refugee status revoked, placing them in a situation of uncertainty and precariousness. In June 2007, the German government asked the asylum authorities to temporarily suspend the revocation of refugee status for certain groups of Iraqis such as those from Baghdad, single women, and members of religious minorities such as Christians.

It was estimated in April 2007 that 14,000 Iraqis were living with 'tolerated status' in Germany, with the threat of possible imminent deportation hanging over them.

=== Greece ===
Greece is the most common entry point into the EU for Iraqis. A large proportion enter the country after a treacherous journey across the quasi-border separating Central and Southern Iraq from the northern regions, from where they cross the mountains into Turkey. Thereafter, they continue along the same routes as thousands of illegal migrants, arriving at one of the Greek islands by speedboat or crossing the Greek–Turkish land border. From Greece, Iraqis generally travel on before making an asylum claim, either to the northern European countries, or to Madrid, Spain from where the USA or Latin America can be reached.

=== Hungary ===
Approximately 1,200 Iraqi refugees have immigrated to Hungary.

=== Ireland ===
Sources claim there to be 340 Iraqi refugees living in Ireland.

=== Italy ===
The current population of Iraqis in Italy stands at 6,043 according to ISTAT, representing an increase compared to 2016, when they were around the half of the current population.; however one source claims there to be 1,068, which is approximately 50 families. Most of these are priests, nuns and seminarians who have come to pursue their studies in Italy. The majority are residents of Rome.

There have been recent appeals from the Iraqi community living in Italy to free any Italian and Iraqi Italian residents currently working in Iraq.

In November 2007, 800 Iraqi Kurds sought refugee in Italy, of which only 20 of them applied for asylum and the other received 15-day expulsion orders.

=== Romania ===
As of 2019, there are at least 3.000 Iraqi-born people living in Romania.

=== Russia ===
Significant groups of Iraqis have emigrated to Russia as early as the 1990s. Iran credits Russia with being one of the first countries to provide concrete assistance in processing Iraqi refugees; Russia's Emergency Situations Ministry began preparing two sites for refugee camps in western Iran in April 2003. However, Iraqis admitted to Russia often find themselves the targets of racism; as with Afghan refugees, they are mistaken for migrants from the Caucasus, who are stereotyped in Russia as drug dealers and criminals.

=== Spain ===
The current population of Iraqis in Spain is unknown; however, since the Iraq War, Spain has been host to 45 Iraqi refugees. An additional 42 Iraqis requested asylum in 2006. There are roughly about 3,700 asylum seekers in Spain, and a further 642 Iraqis hold residency permits.

Iraqi immigration to Spain accounted for 1,706 permanent residents in the year 2006.

=== Switzerland ===
The current population of Iraqis in Switzerland is estimated to be around 5,000. However, the Swiss government is currently closing doors to future Iraqi refugees, and offering to send external aid instead. Christoph Blocher, the Swiss Justice and Police Minister, stated that "We already have 5,000 Iraqis in Switzerland and our country is in second place in Europe in accepting them".

=== United Kingdom ===
The UK—a country that not only had historically hosted a large number of Iraqi refugees but one that had also participated in the invasion of Iraq—granted refugee status or complementary protection to only 8.7 percent of the Iraqi asylum-seekers in 2005, a significant decrease if considered that from 1997 to 2001 that rate averaged 44 percent.
