= European Union Advisory Mission in Iraq =

Civilian security mission in Iraq

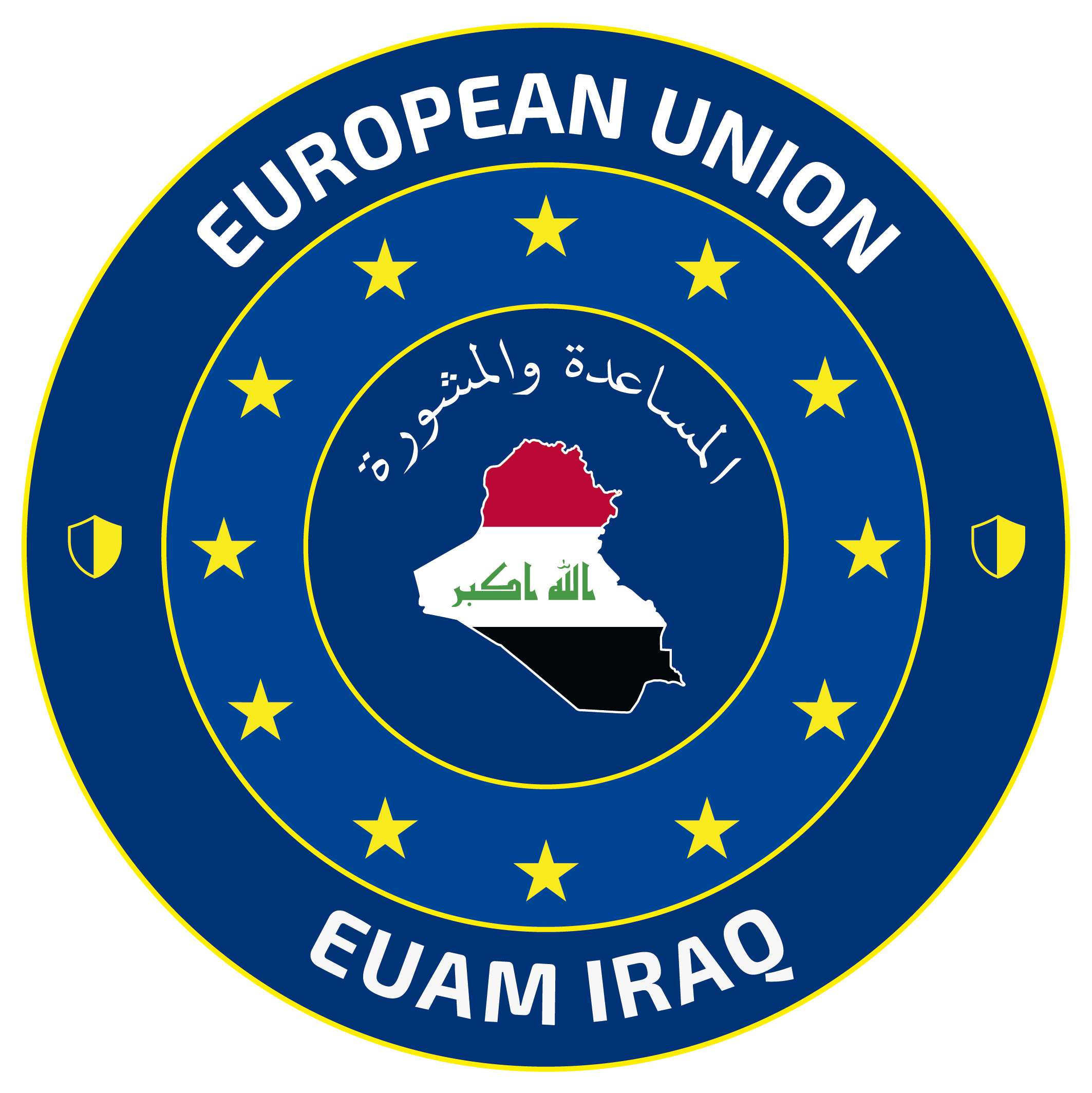
Logo of European Union Advisory Mission in Iraq

The European Union Advisory Mission in Iraq (EUAM Iraq) is a civilian European Union Mission under the Common Security and Defence Policy (CSDP), providing strategic advice and capacity support to strengthen Iraq's Security Sector Reform (SSR) and institutional response to Terrorism, Organised Crime, and Violent Extremism. The Mission supports the implementation of Iraq's National Security Strategy (NSS) while promoting the rule of law, human rights, women empowerment, and international obligations.

Working primarily with the Office of the National Security Advisor (ONSA) and the Ministry of Interior (MoI), EUAM Iraq strengthens Iraqi institutional capacity, supports the development and implementation of national security strategies, and promotes coordination among the EU, Member States, NATO, the United Nations, and other international partners. This contributes to a more effective and accountable security system for a stable and safe Iraq.

== Mission Headquarters and Scope of work ==
EUAM Iraq’s headquarters are located in Baghdad, at the Al Rasheed Hotel. The Mission also has a regional presence in Erbil, the capital of the Kurdistan Region of Iraq. Its work is mostly carried out in the format of workshops, seminars, trainings or official meetings.

In addition to its work in Baghdad and the Kurdistan Region of Iraq, the Mission also regularly conducts visits at regional and provincial levels in support of Iraqi efforts to strengthen countrywide coordination as it relates to civilian Security Sector Reform.

== Heads of Mission ==
The current Commander of Mission of the European Union Mission in Iraq is Ralf Schroeder, of the German Police.

Head of Mission (HoM)	Country	Term of office
Markus Ritter	Germany	2017 - 2019
Christoph Buik	Germany	2020 - 2022
Anne Meskanen	Finland	2022 - 2022
Anders Wiberg	Sweden	2022 - 2025
Ralf Schroeder	Germany	2025 - Now

== Advisory Work ==
Thematic Areas and Priorities:

- National Security Strategy
- Security Sector Reform Coordination
- National Security Legislation
- Command & Control and Crisis Management
- Human Resource Management
- Countering Terrorism and Violent Extremism
- Countering Organised Crime and Narcotics
- Integrated Border Management
- Human Rights and Women's Participation
- Cultural Heritage Protection
