= NATO Mission Iraq =

Non-combat advisory military mission by NATO in Iraq

NATO Mission Iraq (NMI)
- Active: October 2018 – present
- Country: North Atlantic Treaty Organization
- Type: Advisory and capacity-building mission
- Role: Security sector reform Defense institution building
- Size: Approx. 500 personnel (military and civilian)
- Part of: Allied Joint Force Command Naples
- Headquarters: Allied Joint Force Command Naples, Italy; Baghdad, Iraq (office reopening August 2026)
- Website: www.nato.int/en/what-we-do/operations-and-missions/nato-mission-iraq

Commanders
- Commanders: Senior Civilian Representative and Force Commander

NATO Mission Iraq (NMI) is a non-combat advisory and capacity-building mission conducted by the North Atlantic Treaty Organization (NATO) in Iraq. Established at the 2018 Brussels Summit, the mission operates at the invitation of the Government of Iraq to assist in the development of the country's security institutions.

Originally headquartered in Baghdad, NMI focuses on security sector reform and defense institution building. It advises the Iraqi Ministry of Defence, the Office of the National Security Adviser, and the Ministry of Interior. The mission is strictly non-combat; NATO personnel do not participate in direct action or accompany Iraqi forces on combat operations. In March 2026, amid escalating regional security tensions, NATO relocated all mission personnel from Baghdad to Allied Joint Force Command Naples in Italy. In August 2026, Iraq and NATO agreed to establish a dedicated NMI office in Baghdad.

== History ==
=== Background ===
NATO's previous engagement in the country was NATO Training Mission – Iraq (NTM-I), which operated from 2004 to 2011 and focused on training Iraqi security forces and conducting equipment donations. Following the territorial defeat of the Islamic State (ISIL) in late 2017, the Iraqi government requested NATO's assistance to transition from active combat operations to long-term institutional reform and security sector governance.

=== Establishment (2018) ===
At the July 2018 Brussels Summit, NATO Allies agreed to launch NMI to provide strategic-level advice to Iraqi security institutions. Initial operational capability was declared in October 2018, and the mission began its advisory activities in Baghdad shortly thereafter.

=== Enhanced Mandate (2021–2023) ===
At the June 2021 Brussels Summit, NATO leaders agreed to expand NMI's mandate. In August 2023, the North Atlantic Council formally extended the scope of NMI to include advisory and capacity-building activities in support of the Iraqi Ministry of Interior and the Federal Police Command.

=== High-level dialogue, relocation, and return to Baghdad (2024–present) ===
In August 2024, NATO and Iraq launched a high-level political dialogue to build on their practical cooperation and institutional reform efforts.

In March 2026, amid escalating regional security tensions in the Middle East, NATO adjusted its posture and relocated all personnel from NATO Mission Iraq out of Baghdad. The final contingent of mission staff safely departed Iraq on 20 March 2026. Following the relocation, NMI continued its advisory and capacity-building operations remotely from Allied Joint Force Command Naples in Italy. The alliance emphasized that despite the physical relocation, the mission's non-combat advisory mandate in support of Iraqi security forces remained active.

By May 2026, NATO was considering resuming its mission presence in Iraq. On 2 August 2026, Iraq's National Security Advisor and NMI Commander Lieutenant General Ramón Armada agreed to open a dedicated NATO Mission Iraq office in Baghdad, reaffirming continued cooperation on military training and institutional capacity building. The agreement marked a significant step toward restoring NATO's physical presence in Iraq following the March 2026 relocation.

== Mandate and Operations ==
NMI operates under a strict non-combat mandate. Unlike the Global Coalition against Daesh or Operation Inherent Resolve, which have conducted kinetic strikes and direct combat advising, NMI personnel operate exclusively at the institutional and ministerial levels.

Key areas of advisory focus include:

- Defense Institution Building: Assisting the Iraqi Ministry of Defence in developing transparent personnel management, budgeting, and strategic planning.
- Logistics and Maintenance: Advising on the sustainment of military equipment, including Western-donated armored vehicles and aircraft.
- Military Medicine: Developing Iraqi military medical corps capabilities and casualty evacuation protocols.
- Counter-Improvised Explosive Devices (C-IED): Advising on the strategic management of C-IED centers and explosive ordnance disposal (EOD) training standards.
- Good Governance: Promoting human rights, gender perspectives, and the rule of law within Iraqi security forces.

The mission coordinates its activities with the European Union Advisory Mission in Iraq (EUAM Iraq) and the United Nations Assistance Mission for Iraq (UNAMI) to prevent duplication of effort in the security sector reform space.

== Structure and Command ==
NMI utilizes a dual-command structure consisting of both civilian and military leadership:

- Senior Civilian Representative (SCR): Leads the civilian component of the mission and serves as the primary diplomatic liaison to the Iraqi government and international organizations.
- Force Commander: A general officer responsible for the military advisory teams and the security of NATO personnel. Since May 2026, the position has been held by Lieutenant General Ramón Armada.

Prior to 2026, the mission was headquartered in the Green Zone in Baghdad. It comprises several hundred military and civilian personnel contributed by both NATO member states and partner nations, including Australia, Finland, Jordan, Sweden, and the United Kingdom.

== See also ==
- NATO Training Mission – Iraq
- Operation Inherent Resolve
- Foreign relations of Iraq
- Iraqi Armed Forces
