= Foreign relations of Kurdistan Region =

Foreign policy of the Iraq's Kurdistan Region

Relations of the Kurdistan Region of Iraq (KRI) with foreign states and organizations are managed by the Kurdistan Regional Government (KRG). The KRG's primary body for directing its foreign affairs is the Department of Foreign Relations (DFR). The DFR's foremost objectives are to raise the global profile of the Kurdistan Region, improve the Region's international ties with various governments and international organizations, and present emerging business opportunities in the Kurdistan Region to regional and international actors. Kurdistan Region does not have a foreign policy independent of the Iraqi federal government. Instead, KRG follows the foreign policy laid out by the Iraqi government.

A total of 31 countries have a diplomatic presence in Erbil. Multinational bodies, including the EU, UN, ICRC, JICA and the KOICA also have offices in Kurdistan. The KRG's presence abroad has grown significantly since 2007. Currently the KRG has representative offices in 14 countries.

== Department of Foreign Relations ==
Kurdistan Region established the Department of Foreign Relations (DFR) in September 2006 to conduct relations with the international community. Today, the DFR is an integral part of the government, with a wide-ranging portfolio of responsibilities. DFR used to be headed by Foreign Minister Falah Mustafa Bakir from 2006. It has been headed by Minister Safeen Dizayee since 2019. The KRG Department of Foreign Relations is mandated to promote the interests of the Kurdistan Region and its people in regard to relations with the international community and in accordance with the Region's legislation and the Constitution of Iraq.

The key responsibilities of the department include:

- Strengthening bilateral relations with the international community
- Promoting trade, investment, tourism and institutional ties
- Supervising the KRG's offices overseas
- Liaising with the diplomatic community in the Kurdistan Region
- Organising the visits of political and economic delegations to the Kurdistan Region
- Coordinating and organising KRG relations with the Iraqi Ministry of Foreign Affairs and Iraqi embassies abroad
- Conducting and supporting activities that enhance the image of the Kurdistan Region
- Communicating between official KRG institutions and the international community
- Providing legal and authentication services to the people of the region and its citizens abroad

== Bilateral relations ==
=== Americas ===
Country	Notes
United States	US Secretary of Defense Robert Gates talks with KRG President Massoud Barzani in Erbil, on 8 April 2011. See Kurdistan Region–United States relations: The United States developed an official, institutionalized relationship with the Kurdistan Regional Government, evolving into a strategic and political partnership; The Kurdistan Region maintains a representative office in the United States since 2007.; The Consulate General of the United States in Erbil was established in 2011 and reinaugurated in 2025 following the construction of a new compound, becoming the largest US consulate in the world.
Canada	See Canada–Kurdistan Region relations

=== Asia ===
Country	Notes
Armenia	See Armenian–Kurdish relations: Armenia has a consulate general in Kurdistan Region.; Relations are described as 'cordial'.
India	See India–Kurdistan Region relations: Diplomatic relations between India and the Kurdistan Regional Government remain limited despite historical ties, with cooperation mainly in energy (including Indian purchases of Kurdish oil via Turkey), labor, and education/medical travel.; In 2014, Hemin Hawrani called for stronger political and economic ties, describing India as an important partner and encouraging investment and a diplomatic presence in Erbil.; The same year, India sent special envoy Suresh K. Reddy to the region, expressing support for the Kurdistan Region and the Peshmerga, and announcing plans to open an Indian consulate in Kurdistan.
Israel (denied)	See Israel–Kurdistan Region relations: Relations between Israel and the Kurdistan Regional Government have been informally positive, with reports since 2004 of contacts between Israeli officials and Kurdish leaders such as Masoud Barzani and Jalal Talabani, alongside acknowledgment by Ariel Sharon.; Kurdish leadership has signaled openness to formal ties, with Barzani stating in 2006 that relations with Israel were not problematic and could expand if Baghdad normalized relations.; In 2014, Israeli Prime Minister Benjamin Netanyahu publicly supported the establishment of an independent Kurdish state, citing Kurdish political moderation and legitimacy for independence.; In 2026, Masrour Barzani stated that KRG has no relations with Israel.
Jordan	See Jordan–Kurdistan Region relations
Kuwait	See Kurdistan Region–Kuwait relations
Palestine	See Kurdistan Region–Palestine relations
South Korea	See Kurdistan Region–South Korea relations: The Kurdistan Regional Government and South Korea maintain strong diplomatic, economic, and military relations.; Zaytun Division, a Republic of Korea Army contingent, was deployed to the Kurdistan Region from 2004 to 2008, focusing on reconstruction and humanitarian support, with troop levels peaking at around 3,600 personnel in Erbil.; South Korea established a consulate in Erbil in 2004, reflecting its ongoing diplomatic presence in the region.
Syria	See Kurdistan Region–Syria relations
Turkey	See Kurdistan Region–Turkey relations: The Kurdistan Regional Government and Turkey developed economic and geopolitical ties from the late 2000s, marked by expanding trade, energy cooperation, and the opening of the Consulate General of Turkey in Erbil in 2010.; The partnership deepened through major energy agreements, including pipeline deals in 2012, and was symbolized by Recep Tayyip Erdoğan's landmark visit to the Kurdistan Region in 2011, the first by a Turkish leader.; Relations were strained following the 2017 Kurdistan Region independence referendum, which Turkey strongly opposed, leading to temporary flight suspensions and media restrictions, though trade and border access largely continued.; Ties began to normalize afterward, highlighted by a 2019 meeting between Nechirvan Barzani and Erdoğan in Istanbul, signaling renewed political engagement.

=== Australia ===
Country	Notes
Australia	See Australia–Kurdistan Region relations

=== Europe ===
Country	Notes
Albania	Albania sent weapons to Kurdistan Region in 2014 in the fight against Islamic State.
Armenia	See Armenian–Kurdish relations: Armenia has a consulate general in the Kurdistan Regional's capital.
Austria	See Austria–Kurdistan Region relations: Austria has a commercial office in Erbil.; Kurdistan Region has a representation in Vienna.
Belgium	See Belgium–Kurdistan Region relations: Belgium has no representation in Kurdistan Region.; Kurdistan Region has no representation in Belgium.
Bulgaria	See Bulgaria–Kurdistan Region relations: Bulgaria has a commercial office in Erbil, and has plans to open a consulate in Erbil.; Kurdistan has no representation in Bulgaria.
Croatia	See Croatia–Kurdistan Region relations: Croatia plans on opening a consulate in Erbil.; Kurdistan has no representation in Croatia.
Cyprus	Cyprus sent weapons to Kurdistan Region in 2017 in the fight against Islamic State.
Czech Republic	See Czech Republic–Kurdistan Region relations: Czech Republic has a consulate general in Erbil.; Kurdistan has no representation in the Czech Republic.
Estonia	Estonia sent weapons to Kurdistan Region in 2014 in the fight against Islamic State.
Finland	Finland has a military presence in Kurdistan Region, having 50 soldiers training Kurdish soldiers. As of April 2017, about 1,700 Kurdish soldiers have finished training.
France	See France–Kurdistan Region relations: France has a consulate general in Erbil.; Kurdistan Region has a representation in Paris.
Germany	See Germany–Kurdistan Region relations: Germany has a consulate general in Erbil.; Kurdistan Region has a representation in Berlin.
Greece	See Greece–Kurdistan Region relations: Greece has a consulate general in Erbil.; Kurdistan Region has no representation in Greece.
Holy See	See Holy See–Kurdistan Region relations: Kurdish President Masoud Barzani has visited the three Popes; Pope John Paul II, Pope Benedict XVI and Pope Francis in Vatican City.
Hungary	See Hungary–Kurdistan Region relations: Hungary has a consulate general in Erbil.; Kurdistan has no representation in Hungary.
Italy	See Italy–Kurdistan Region relations: Italy has a consulate in Erbil.; Kurdistan Region has a representation in Rome.
Netherlands	See Kurdistan Region–Netherlands relations: Netherlands has a consulate general in Erbil.; Kurdistan Region has no representation in the Netherlands.
Norway	Norway has a military presence in Kurdistan Region, training Kurdish soldiers.
Poland	See Kurdistan Region–Poland relations: Poland has a consulate general in Erbil.; Kurdistan Region has a representation in Warsaw.
Romania	See Kurdistan Region–Romania relations: Romania has a consular office in Erbil.; Kurdistan Region has no representation in Romania.
Russia	See Kurdistan Region–Russia relations: Russia has a consulate general in Erbil.; Kurdistan Region has a representation in Moscow.
Slovakia	See Kurdistan Region–Slovakia relations
Slovenia	Slovenia has a military presence in Kurdistan Region, training Kurdish soldiers.
Spain	See Kurdistan Region–Spain relations: Spain has no representation in Kurdistan Region.; Kurdistan Region has a representation in Madrid.
Sweden	See Kurdistan Region–Sweden relations: Sweden has a consulate office in Erbil.; Kurdistan Region has a representation in Stockholm.
Switzerland	Switzerland has no representation in Kurdistan Region.; Kurdistan Region has a representation in Bern.
United Kingdom	UK Minister for Trade and Investment Ian Livingston talks with Prime Minister of Kurdistan Region Nechervan Barzani in London, on 19 May 2014.: United Kingdom has a consulate general in Erbil.; Kurdistan Region has a representation in London.

=== Non-state actors ===
Country	Notes
Rojava	See Rojava–Kurdistan Region relations

== Participation in international sports federations ==
Kurdistan Region holds 'member' status in two international sports federations.

International organisation	Status	Representation	Application date	Admission date	Notes
N.F.-Board	member	Iraqi Kurdistan Football Association		December 2008	In 2008, an Iraqi Kurdistani team participated for the first time in the Viva World Cup. Iraqi Kurdistan hosted Viva World Cup in 2012 and won it.
CONIFA	member	Iraqi Kurdistan Football Association		June 2013	In May 2016, an Iraqi Kurdistan team will participate in the ConIFA World Football Cup hosted by Abkhazia.

== See also ==
- List of diplomatic missions in Kurdistan Region
- Foreign relations of Iraq
