= Kurdistan Region–Syria relations =

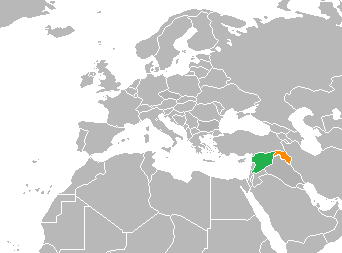
- Syria: Kurdistan Region

Kurdistan Region–Syria relations are bilateral relations between Kurdistan Region (Note: While Kurdistan Region refers to the autonomous Kurdish region in Northern Iraq, Iraqi Kurdistan is a geographical term referring to the Kurdish area of Iraq) and Syria. Kurdistan Region and Syria are neighbors, but Kurdistan Region only borders PYD-held Rojava since the Syrian civil war. Kurdistan Region and Syria share two border-crossings, and 237,364 Syrian refugees remained in Kurdistan Region in December 2023.

== History ==
Due to the strained relations between Syria and Iraq under Hafez al-Assad and Saddam Hussein respectively, Assad supported Kurdish rebels in Northern Iraq as they fought Iraqi forces. In 1975, the Patriotic Union of Kurdistan was established in Damascus by Jalal Talabani and the Syrian regime established formal ties with Kurdistan Democratic Party in 1979, as Idris Barzani visited Damascus. Damascus tried to unite the various Iraqi Kurdish fractions against the Iraqi regime and offices for both parties were opened in Qamishli.

When the Syrian civil war reached the Kurdish areas of North Syria in 2012, President of Kurdistan Region Masoud Barzani gathered the various Kurdish factions of Syria in Erbil to unite them against Syrian President Bashar al-Assad. Many Syrian soldiers of Kurdish origin deserted at the early stages of the Syrian civil war and fled to Kurdistan Region to form "Rojava Peshmerga" which is funded by Kurdistan Region. Kurdish Foreign Minister Falah Mustafa Bakir stated that: "We want to a see a democratic and representative government in Damascus, and the opposition must take into consideration the recognition, rights and future of all the minority groups." In 2015, Syrian MP Sharif Shahada visited Erbil, where he mentioned that Barzani declined to visit Damascus back in 2011. Responding to the Kurdistan Region's independence referendum in September 2017, Syrian MP Riyaz Taus stated that Syria did not support the referendum, because it was a unilateral decision without Baghdad's consent. Advisor to the Council of Ministers Said Azzouz also echoed that any unilateral action will be rejected and that Syria cannot accept the division of Iraq. Furthermore, he stated that independence needed legal provisions from the Iraqi constitution.

In August 2017, Syrian Minister of Tourism Bishr Yaziji visited Erbil to strengthen tourism ties.

== Relations after the fall of the Assad regime ==
Following the fall of the Assad regime in December 2024, relations between the Kurdistan Region and the new Syrian authorities saw notable developments. In January 2025, Kurdistan Regional Government Prime Minister Masrour Barzani met Syrian Foreign Minister Asaad al-Shaibani on the sidelines of the World Economic Forum in Davos. The two discussed bilateral relations between the Kurdistan Region and Syria, as well as political and security developments in Syria and the wider region. During the meeting, al-Shaibani stated that Kurds were an essential part of Syrian society and that their rights would be protected. He also invited Barzani to visit Damascus.

On 11 April 2025, President of the Kurdistan Region Nechirvan Barzani met Syrian President Ahmed al-Sharaa on the sidelines of the Antalya Diplomacy Forum in Turkey. The two discussed the future of Syria's relations with Iraq and the Kurdistan Region on the basis of good-neighbourly relations and mutual interests, as well as efforts to combat the Islamic State. Barzani stressed the importance of reaching a political solution in Syria that would guarantee the rights of all communities, particularly the Kurds, while al-Sharaa expressed Syria's desire to strengthen relations with Iraq and the Kurdistan Region.

The Kurdistan Region's leadership also played a role in contacts concerning relations between the new Syrian authorities and Syrian Kurdish forces. In March 2025, Nechirvan Barzani welcomed the agreement reached between Ahmed al-Sharaa and Syrian Democratic Forces commander Mazloum Abdi, describing it as a constructive roadmap for the transitional period and reaffirming the Kurdistan Region's support for peace and stability in Syria and for guaranteeing the rights of all its communities. In April of the same year, Barzani received Abdi in Erbil, where they discussed relations between the Syrian Democratic Forces, the Syrian government and Kurdish political parties, as well as counterterrorism and the future participation of Kurds and other communities in Syria's governance.

Direct contacts between Erbil and Damascus continued during 2026. In April, Nechirvan Barzani and Ahmed al-Sharaa held another meeting on the sidelines of the Antalya Diplomacy Forum, where they discussed expanding relations between the Kurdistan Region, Iraq and Syria, particularly economic and commercial cooperation, as well as the situation of Kurds and other Syrian communities.

Nechirvan Barzani with Ahmed al-Sharaa during an official meeting in Damascus.

On 3 August 2026, Nechirvan Barzani visited Damascus and met Ahmed al-Sharaa at the People's Palace, marking the first visit by a president of the Kurdistan Region to Syria since the fall of Bashar al-Assad's regime. Their talks focused on bilateral relations, economic cooperation, coordination between the two sides and regional issues. Barzani also stressed the importance of Syria's role in promoting peace, security and stability in the region.

Nechirvan Barzani and Ahmed al-Sharaa during an official meeting in Damascus.

Nechirvan Barzani and his delegation meeting with Ahmed al-Sharaa in Damascus.

== See also ==
- Iraq–Syria relations
- AANES–Syria relations
- Kurdistan Region–Rojava relations
- Kurdish National Council
- Rabia, Iraq
