= Kurdistan Region–Slovakia relations =

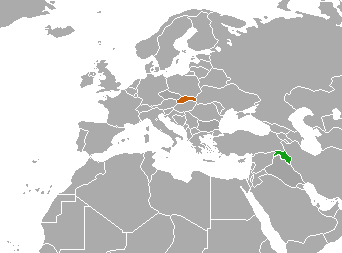
- Kurdistan Region: Slovakia

Kurdistan Region–Slovakia relations are bilateral relations between Kurdistan Region (Note: While Kurdistan Region refers to the autonomous Kurdish region in Northern Iraq, Iraqi Kurdistan is a geographical term referring to the Kurdish area of Iraq) and Slovakia. Kurdistan Region has no representation in Slovakia, and the latter has no representation in Kurdistan Region. Chairman of the Kurdistan Investment Board Herish Muharam visited Bratislava in 2012 to boost economic ties. Muharam met with Slovak Ministry of Foreign and European Affairs, Minister of Economy, the Executive Director of the Slovak Investment and Trade Development Agency, and the Secretary General of the Slovak Chamber of Commerce and Industry.

In April 2014, Slovak ambassador to Iraq Miroslav Nad met with Kurdish Foreign Minister Falah Mustafa Bakir in Erbil, discussing to strengthen bilateral ties. In May 2014, Mustafa Bakir travelled to Bratislava for the Globsec 2014, where he met with Slovak Foreign Minister Miroslav Lajčák. Lajčák stated that: "We see the relations with Iraq, including Kurdistan, as highly prospective – and trade-and-commerce is of key importance in this regard". In the same year, Slovakia sent an undisclosed amount of arms cache to Kurdish soldiers in their fight against ISIS. Humanitarian aid has also been sent to Kurdistan Region. In 2015 and 2017, Mustafa Bakir was present at the Globsec as well, meeting Miroslav Lajcak again to strengthen political and economic ties.

== See also ==
- Foreign relations of Kurdistan Region
- Foreign relations of Slovakia
