= Greece–Kurdistan Region relations =

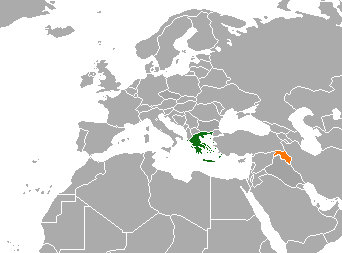
- Greece: Kurdistan Region

Greece–Kurdistan Region relations are bilateral relations between Greece and Kurdistan Region. (Note: While Kurdistan Region refers to the autonomous Kurdish region in Northern Iraq, Iraqi Kurdistan is a geographical term referring to the Kurdish area of Iraq) Greece has an economic and commercial office in Erbil, while Kurdistan Region has no representation in Greece. In February 2017, Greek Foreign Minister Nikos Kotzias described Kurdistan as having a geostrategic role in the region and constituting an important element in Greek geostrategic policy, and these were the reasons Greece opened a consulate general in Erbil in May 2016.

Kurdish Foreign Minister Falah Mustafa Bakir visited Athens in November 2015 and met with Greek Deputy Foreign Minister Dimitris Mardas and Secretary General for International Economic Relations Giorgos Tsipras. In the fight against ISIS, the Greek government decided to aid Kurdish soldiers (Peshmerga) by donating Kalashnikov rifles and ammunition and also sending humanitarian aid. In addition, Greece served as a staging point for Belgian F-16s participating in airstrikes against ISIS in Iraq during the American-led intervention in Iraq.

In an interview with Kurdistan 24, Greek Minister for Migration Ioannis Mouzalas stated that Greeks and the Kurds of Greece have exceptional ties. The Greek community in Kurdistan Region is estimated to be about 30–50. A 2004 report guessed the total number of Iraqis in Greece as being between 5,000 and 40,000.

Many Greek companies are present in Kurdistan Region, including construction companies, food companies and energy companies. Greek investments in the region amount to about 2 billion euros.

== Greek position to Kurdish independence ==
In an interview with Alpha Radio, Kotzias stated that the Kurdish independence referendum in September 2017 was guaranteed by the Iraqi constitution and that Kurdistan Region has a right to hold it. Vice-President of the Greek party New Democracy Adonis Georgiadis has stated that his party supports the referendum and the Kurdish right to self-determination.

== History ==
In 2012, Greek ambassador to Iraq Merkourios Karafotias visited Erbil and met with Kurdish President Masoud Barzani, where the latter stated that: "Our people have an old relationship with each other. We appreciate the ties that already exist between us, and we are ready to coordinate and work together to further develop these relations." Greek Deputy Secretary General for International Economic Relations and Development Cooperation Magdalini Karakoli visited Erbil in 2014 and met with Kurdish Foreign Minister Falah Mustafa. The two discussed in which areas the two parties could increase cooperation and Karakoli said that: "We enjoy a strong bond of friendship with Kurdistan". In an interview with Kathimerini in 2014, Chief of Staff to the Prime Minister and Kurdistan Regional Government Safeen Dizayee stated that Greece had a dynamic business and diplomatic presence in Kurdistan Region and that the Kurdish government appreciated the solidarity towards the Kurds.

In 2017, the Greek Ambassador to Iraq, Dionyssios Kyvetos, visited Erbil and announced the Greek Government's decision to upgrade its representation in the Kurdistan Region from Trade Office to Consulate General. The head of the Kurdistan Region's Department of Foreign Relations Falah Mustafa welcomed the decision.

== See also ==
- Foreign relations of Greece
- Foreign relations of Kurdistan Region
