= Kurdish Canadians =

Canadians of Kurdish origin

Total population
- 50,000 (stimate); 23,130 (2021 census); 16,315 (2016 census)

Regions with significant populations
- Toronto, Montreal, Vancouver, Calgary, Edmonton, Ottawa

Languages
- Kurdish Turkish language, Canadian English, Canadian French

Religion
- Majority Islam (Sunni Muslim, Shia Islam) with minorities of Kurdish Alevism, Yazidism, Yarsanism, Zoroastrianism, Judaism, Christianity

Related ethnic groups
- Kurdish diaspora

Kurdish Canadians refers to people of Kurdish origin who are born in or living in Canada.

The Kurdish community in Canada is 16,315 based on the 2016 Canadian Census, among which the Iraqi Kurds make up the largest group of Kurds in Canada, exceeding the numbers of Kurds from Turkey, Iran and Syria.

In Canada, Kurdish immigration was largely the result of the Iran–Iraq War, the Gulf War and Syrian Civil War. Thus, many Iraqi Kurds immigrated to Canada due to the constant wars and suppression of Kurds and Shiites by the Iraqi government. Many Kurds arrived in Canada in the 1980s and the 1990s, most of whom were refugees resettled by the Government of Canada. However, smaller numbers of them also immigrated to Canada in the 1960s and 1970s.

Like all Canadians with origins in West Asia, Kurdish Canadians are legally defined as a visible minority, irrespective of their appearance.

== 2011 census ==
Provinces and territories	Kurdish as mother tongue
Ontario	6,830
Alberta	1,465
British Columbia	1,435
Quebec	1,415
Manitoba	260
Saskatchewan	110
Nova Scotia	55
New Brunswick	40
Prince Edward Island	30

== 2016 census ==
Province or territory	Number of Kurdish speakers
Ontario	8,095
British Columbia	1,915
Alberta	1,680
Quebec	1,040
Manitoba	440
Saskatchewan	155
Nova Scotia	125
New Brunswick	55
Newfoundland and Labrador	10
Nunavut	5
Northwest Territories	–
Prince Edward Island	–
Yukon	–

== Notable people ==
- Arezu Jahani-Asl,
- Jalal Barzanji, contemporary Kurdish poet, writer and activist
- Zaynê Akyol, film producer
- Azad Bonni, Canadian/American neuroscientist
- Amir Hassanpour, Kurdish scholar and researcher
- Ebrahim Karimi (physicist)
- Michael Haykin, Professor of Church History and Biblical Spirituality and Director of The Andrew Fuller Center for Baptist Studies at the Southern Baptist Theological Seminary.
- Madeh Piryonesi, Kurdish-Canadian writer and engineer

== See also ==
- Middle Eastern Canadians
- West Asian Canadians
- Kurdish population
- Kurdish Americans
- Iranian Canadians
- Iraqi Canadians
- Syrian Canadians
- Turkish Canadians
- Canada–Kurdistan Region relations
