= Iraq–Romania relations =

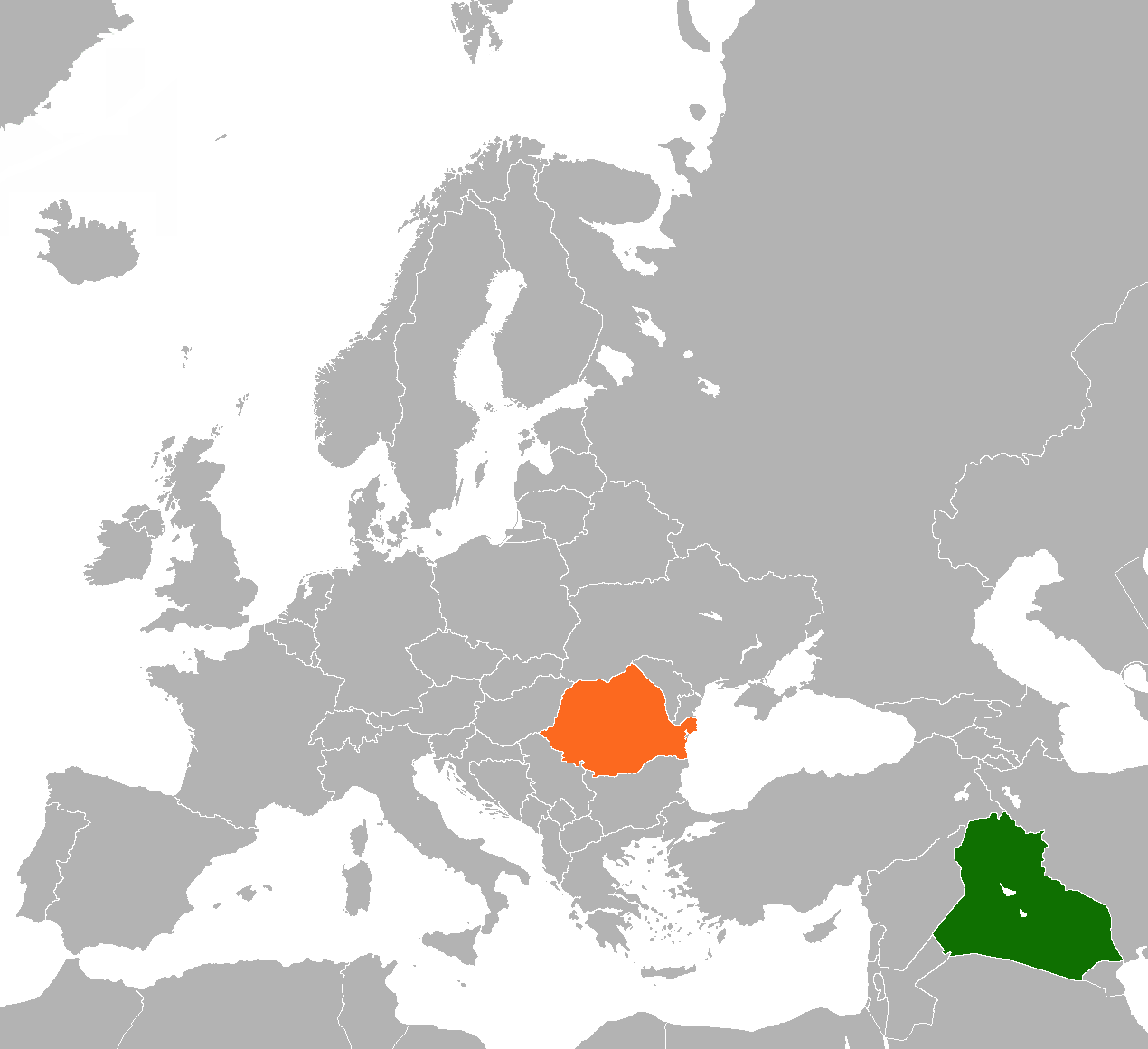
- Iraq: Romania

Iraq–Romania relations are the bilateral relations between Iraq and Romania. Iraq has an embassy in Bucharest, while Romania has an embassy in Baghdad and a consulate in Erbil. Both countries officially established diplomatic relations on 14 August 1958.

On 5 November 2012, the Romanian consulate in Erbil, capital of the Kurdistan Region, was opened. The Romanian Minister of Foreign Affairs Titus Corlățean visited the city to inaugurate it. The act was well perceived by both the Iraqi authorities and the regional Kurdish ones. Corlățean said that "Romania is keen to strengthen relations with Iraq, and this consulate will have a significant role in strengthening the relations between Romania and Iraq and the Kurdistan Region".

On 23 November 2017, Teodor Meleșcanu, the Romanian Minister of Foreign Affairs, met with Ibrahim al-Jaafari, Minister of Foreign Affairs of Iraq. Both discussed various points of political and economic cooperation, and agreed to intensify the dialogues between the two countries. Meleșcanu also highlighted Romania's interest in participating in the reconstruction of Iraq after the civil war.

On 7 January 2020, due to the tensions between Iran and the United States, Romania removed its 14 training troops in Iraq. Romanian President Klaus Iohannis, concerned about Romanian citizens working in Iraq and nearby countries, called for an "a calm, diplomatic approach" for the de-escalation of the conflict.

== Resident diplomatic missions ==
- Iraq has an embassy in Bucharest.
- Romania has an embassy in Baghdad and a consulate-general in Erbil.

== See also ==
- Foreign relations of Iraq
- Foreign relations of Romania
- Kurdistan Region–Romania relations
