= Kurds in the Netherlands =

Ethnic group in the Netherlands

Kurds in the Netherlands Koerden in Nederland Kurdên Holendayê
Regions with significant populations
- from 40,000 up to almost 100,000

Languages
- Kurdish and Dutch

Religion
- Sunni Islam, Alevi

Related ethnic groups
- Iranian peoples, Kurdish diaspora

Kurds in the Netherlands (Dutch: Koerden in Nederland; Kurdish: Kurdên Holendayê) may refer to people born in or residing in the Netherlands of Kurdish origin.

There are different accounts for the actual Kurdish population within the Netherlands. "The number of Kurds in the Netherlands is not clear, as the Kurds hold different nationalities (Turkish, Iranian, Iraqi and Syrian) and are categorized on the basis of their nationalities in governmental statistics; the figures run from 15,000 up to almost 100,000." Other sources claim that the number of ethnic Kurds in the Netherlands is around 70,000 people.

The Kurdish community in the Netherlands among which the Turkish Kurds and Iraqi Kurds make up the largest group of Kurds in the Netherlands, exceeding the numbers of Iranian Kurds and Syrian Kurds.

== Immigration history ==
In the Netherlands, Kurdish immigrant workers from Turkey first arrived in the second half of the 1960s. Thousands of Kurdish refugees and political refugees fled from Turkey during the 1970s and onward, from Iraq and Iran during the 1980s and 1990s, and from Syria especially during the Syrian Civil War.

== Political activism ==
On 6 October 2014, the Kurds in the Netherlands "stormed the national parliament building in The Hague on Monday night in a protest against ISIS" offensive on the Syrian town of Ayn al-Arab, known in Kurdish as Kobani.

On 13 May 2015, "Dutch police raided a secret meeting of members of the Kurdistan Workers Party (PKK) in the Netherlands". The office of Dutch prosecutors explained "that the Kurdish PKK recruits young Kurds in the Netherlands for its armed struggle against the Turkish army".

On 8 June 2015, the Kurds in the Netherlands celebrated the success of "the left-wing pro-Kurdish party, which won 13 percent of the votes in the Turkish parliamentary elections, leading to much joy and celebrations among Kurds.". The Kurdish minority within the state of Turkey "who want more autonomy for Turkish Kurdistan, but Turkey refuses to give it". In October 2019, thousands of Dutch Kurds staged a protest in Amsterdam, Rotterdam and The Hague over Turkey's military operation in northeastern Syria.

== Notable people ==
- Naaz (singer), Dutch-Kurdish singer
- Rewan Amin, professional footballer
- Venus Faiq, Dutch writer, poet, translator, editor, and journalist
- Olcay Gulsen, Dutch fashion designer
- Fuad Hussein, Iraqi Kurdish politician

== See also ==
- Kurdistan Region–Netherlands relations
- Kurdish population
- Kurds in Belgium
- Kurds in France
- Kurds in Germany
- Kurds in the United Kingdom
