= Croatia–Kurdistan Region relations =

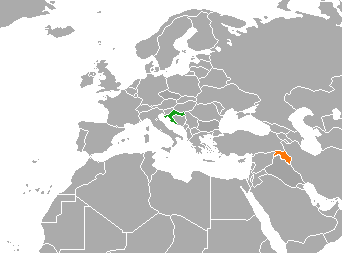

- Croatia: Kurdistan Region

Croatia–Kurdistan Region relations are bilateral relations between Croatia and Kurdistan Region. (Note: While Kurdistan Region refers to the autonomous Kurdish region in Northern Iraq, Iraqi Kurdistan is a geographical term referring to the Kurdish area of Iraq) Croatia has plans of opening a consulate in Erbil, while Kurdistan Region has no representation in Croatia. In August 2014, after a request by the United States, Croatian authorities sent an undisclosed amount of weapons to Kurdistan Region. The weapons were mostly of Yugoslav origin. Later, it was revealed that the military aid included 20,000 pieces of HS Produkt VHSs.

== Strengthening of ties ==
In 2009, Kurdish Minister of the Interior Mahmood Mohammed met with Mayor of Zagreb Milan Bandić. Croatian Foreign Minister Vesna Pusić visited Erbil and met with Deputy Prime Minister of Kurdistan Region Qubad Talabani to discuss military and humanitarian aid and cooperation in May 2015. In July 2015, Croatian Defence Minister Ante Kotromanović visited Erbil and it was decided that Croatia would send soldiers to train Kurdish soldiers, after a meeting with Kurdish officials. During the visit, Kotromanović stated that: "Croatia is proud to be a member of the anti-ISIS Coalition. We have provided military assistance to the Peshmerga forces and we are determined to continue cooperation with Kurdish security forces until ISIS is defeated." Kurdish Foreign Minister Falah Mustafa Bakir and a delegation visited Zagreb for the 49th International Folklore Festival, where a Kurdish-Croatian cultural week was held. At the event, Bakir stated that: "The event provided a good opportunity for participants to experience authentic culture and heritage of Kurdistan. Such events can further promote cultural exchanges and enhance mutual understanding between the people of Kurdistan and the people of Croatia."

Kurdistan Region President Masoud Barzani held a meeting with Croatian President Kolinda Grabar-Kitarović at the sidelines of Munich Security Conference in Berlin in February 2016. Kitarović told reporters that: "Croatia will definitely continue supporting Peshmerga forces".

== Trade and economic ties ==
In 2009, Croatian construction company Ingra signed an agreement with Kurdistan Region, contracting the company to build hospitals and other facilities in Kurdistan Region. In 2013, a Croatian conference was held in Erbil aiming strengthen Croatian export to Kurdistan Region, with the presence of the Croatian companies Ericsson Nikola Tesla, Intea, Croatia Pumpe Nova, Studio BF and Iskra Impuls. In August 2014, A tanker containing Kurdish oil arrived at the Croatian Omišalj port and was unloaded by Croatian authorities. The tanker contained 80,000 cubic meters of crude oil. In November 2016, Croatian Ambassador to Iraq Evan Yorick stated that Croatia would help improving Kurdistan's tourism sector and general economic development.

== See also ==
- Foreign relations of Croatia
- Foreign relations of Kurdistan Region
