= Kurdistan Region–Netherlands relations =

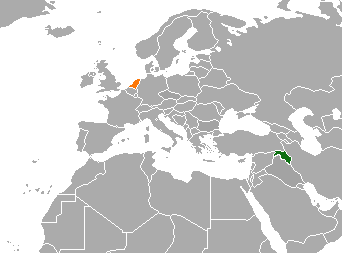
- Kurdistan Region: Netherlands

Kurdistan Region–Netherlands relations are bilateral relations between Kurdistan Region (Note: While Kurdistan Region refers to the autonomous Kurdish region in Northern Iraq, Iraqi Kurdistan is a geographical term referring to the Kurdish area of Iraq) and the Netherlands. While Kurdistan Region has no representation in the Netherlands, the Netherlands has a consulate general in Erbil since 2012. The Netherlands has a military presence in Kurdistan Region and have aided the region with humanitarian aid. The Netherlands also contributed to reforms of the Kurdish economy with 250,000 euros in 2017. In August 2016, Dutch Prime Minister Mark Rutte visited Kurdistan Region and met with high-ranking Kurdish officials and deployed Dutch soldiers. Concerning Kurdish independence, Dutch MP Harry Van Bommel stated that: "I will ask my party to support independent Kurdistan because I think independence is the best way to secure the future of the people in this Region".

There are reportedly 6,000 Dutch Kurds living in the Kurdistan Region.

== History ==
In the early 1990s, the Netherlands took part in the Operation Provide Comfort, which insured Kurdish autonomy in the northern Kurdish region of Iraq. The Dutch government contributed to the American-led operation with an army unit consisting of a medical company, an engineer construction company, headquarters and combat service support company. For this, Aérospatiale Alouette III helicopters from the Royal Netherlands Air Force and 13 personnel were deployed to the region. In the aftermath of the operation, the Dutch government participated in the international effort to send humanitarian aid to Kurdish refugees stuck in the region.

The Netherlands opened a Liaison Office in the region to strengthen ties, especially economic ties, in 2012. At that time, there were 32 registered Dutch companies in Kurdistan Region. In 2014, it was decided to upgrade the Dutch representation to a consulate general. In August 2014, the Dutch government supplied the Kurdish government with humanitarian aid for the growing number of internally displaced people from the war against ISIS and non-lethal military equipment for the Kurdish soldiers (Peshmerga). In December that year, Dutch Foreign Minister Bert Koenders visited Erbil, where he met various high-level Kurdish officials including Prime Minister Nechirvan Barzani, Foreign Minister Falah Mustafa Bakir and Chief of Staff of the Presidency Fuad Hussein. The Netherlands also commenced a training program in the region, where 100 Dutch soldiers were to train Kurdish soldiers. In May 2015, Dutch Defence Minister Jeanine Hennis-Plasschaert visited Erbil and met with Prime Minister Nechirvan Barzani. In May 2016, A Dutch parliamentary delegation visited Erbil to oversee the Dutch contribution in the war against ISIS and the country's aid to Kurdistan Region, and in January 2017 Dutch Defence Minister Jeanine Hennis-Plasschaert and Minister for Development Cooperation Lilianne Ploumen visited Kurdistan Region.

== See also ==
- Foreign relations of Kurdistan Region
- Foreign relations of the Netherlands
