= Kurdistan Region–Spain relations =

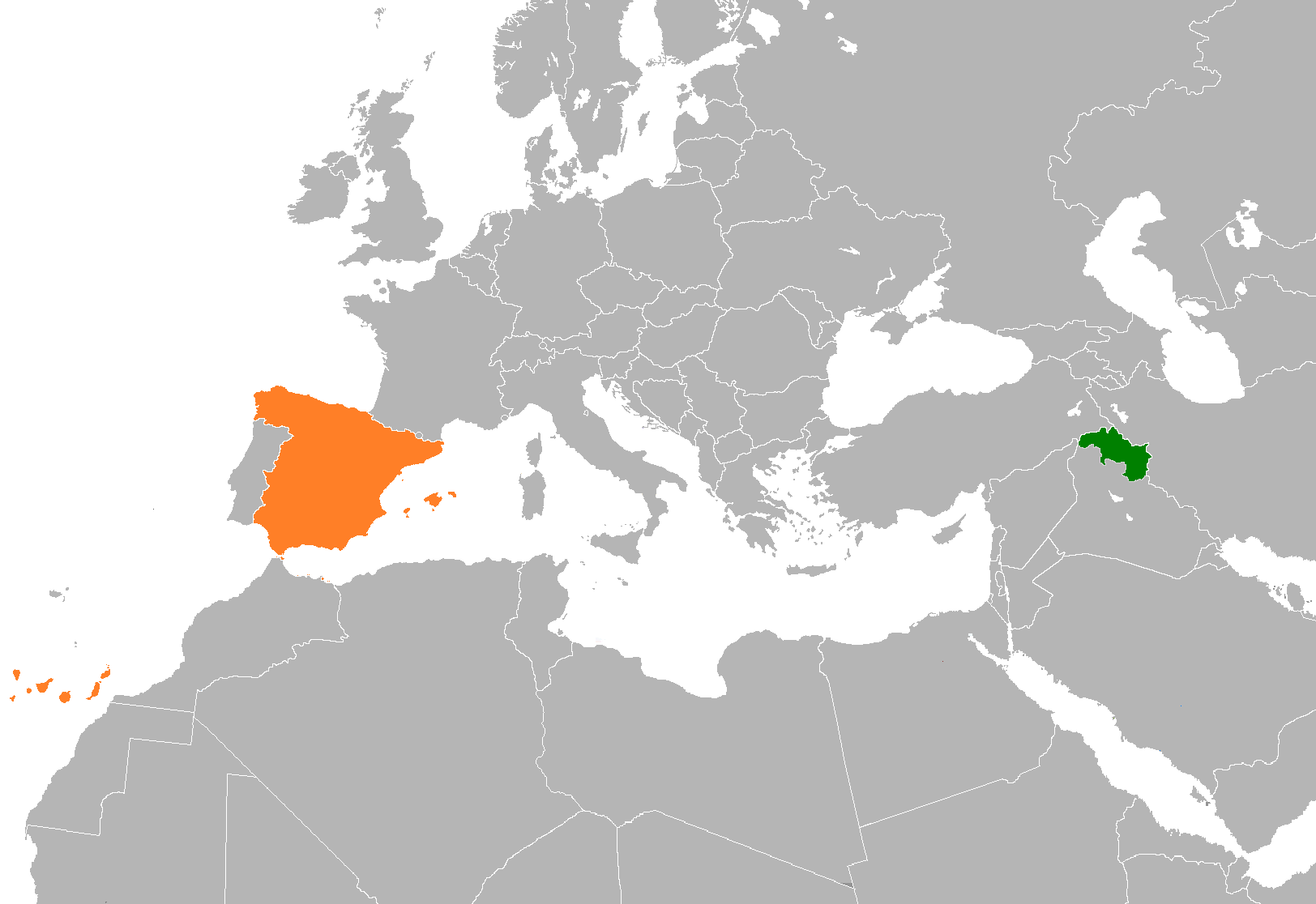
- Kurdistan Region: Spain

Kurdistan Region–Spain relations are bilateral relations between Kurdistan Region (Note: While Kurdistan Region refers to the autonomous Kurdish region in Northern Iraq, Iraqi Kurdistan is a geographical term referring to the Kurdish area of Iraq) and Spain. Kurdistan Region is represented in Spain through a representation in Madrid since 2010, while Spain has no representation in Kurdistan Region. When the Kurdish representation opened in Madrid, the representative Daban Shadala stated that their activities primarily focused on building confidence, trust and friendship between the two parties. These goals were accomplished according to Shadala and Spanish Foreign Minister Jose Garcia-Margallo held a meeting with Deputy Prime Minister of Kurdistan Emad Ahmad which resulted in the opening of a Spanish honorary consulate in Erbil.

In 2014, Kurdish President Masoud Barzani stated that Kurdistan values its relations with Spain.

== Political relations ==
Spain has had a careful policy towards the Kurdish region since they do not want to foster Kurdish separatism, as they have their own separatist issues.

In January 2014, Shadala expressed that the economic relations between the two were minimal with only few Spanish companies present in the region. In August same year, after the ISIS' invasion of Iraq Foreign Minister García-Margallo stated that military support for Kurdistan Region would always be with the consent of the central government in Baghdad. Later it was reported that Spain avoided aiding Kurdish forces. The Spanish government rejected the Kurdish independence referendum taking place in September 2017.

== Catalonia-Kurdish relations ==
After Kurdistan's independence referendum in September 2017, Catalan President Carles Puigdemont congratulated the Kurdish authorities for the referendum. Artur Mas, leader of Convergence and Union, Catalan European Democratic Party and former president of Catalonia also said that he supported the Kurdish bid for independence and applauded the leadership for "defending democracy". Kurdish Foreign Minister Falah Mustafa Bakir visited Catalonia in May 2017 to strengthen the bilateral relations between Kurdistan and Catalonia. During the trip, he met with the President of the Catalan Parliament Carme Forcadell and with Josep Lluís Alay as well. During their meeting, Forcadell stated that Catalonia supported to Kurdistan's right to self-determination and also expressed gratitude to the Peshmerga in defeating ISIS and the role played by the Kurdistan Region in securing stability and hosting a great number of displaced people.

== See also ==
- Foreign relations of Kurdistan Region
- Foreign relations of Spain
- Iraq–Spain relations
