= List of diplomatic missions in Kurdistan Region, Iraq =

Diplomatic missions in Kurdistan Region Kurdistan Region within Iraq States with consulate or representative office in Kurdistan Region

The page lists official representative offices of states and international organisations in Kurdistan Region, a semi-autonomous federal region of Iraq. First fully accredited consulates general was opened by Iran and Russia in 2007. Currently, 31 countries have official representation in Kurdistan Region, while Belarus, Cyprus, Denmark, Slovakia, Spain, Sri Lanka have honorary consulates.

All representatives offices in Kurdistan Region are subordinate to the main diplomatic missions and/or main offices of international organisations based in Baghdad. All except one office are based Erbil, with the only exception being Iran's consulate, which is also in Sulaymaniyah.

The list includes honorary consulates but does not include countries that have expressed interest or plans in opening a representation.

== Consulate General ==
=== Erbil ===
- Armenia
- China
- Czech Republic
- Egypt
- France
- Germany
- Greece
- Hungary
- India
- Iran
- Italy
- Jordan
- Kuwait
- Netherlands
- Palestine
- Poland
- Qatar
- Russia
- Saudi Arabia
- Sudan
- Syria (planned but may be cancelled)
- Turkey
- United Arab Emirates
- United Kingdom
- United States

=== Sulaymaniyah ===
- Iran

== Consular Office ==
- Japan
- Philippines
- Romania
- South Korea

== Honorary consulate ==
- Cyprus
- Denmark
- Spain
- Sri Lanka
- Ukraine

== Representative offices ==
- Austria (Commercial office)
- Bulgaria (Commercial office)
- Canada (Embassy office)
- European Union (Delegation office)
- Sweden (Embassy office)

== NGOs ==
- International Committee of the Red Cross (Regional office)
- Japan International Cooperation Agency (Office)
- Korea International Cooperation Agency (Representative office)
- United Nations Assistance Mission for Iraq (Regional representation office)

== See also ==
- Foreign relations of Iraq
- Foreign relations of Kurdistan Region, Iraq
- List of representative offices of Kurdistan Region, Iraq
