= Kurdistan Region–Poland relations =

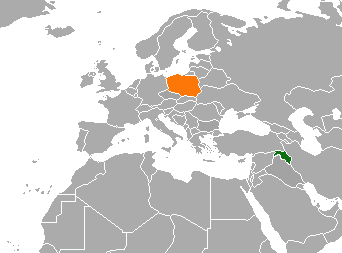
- Kurdistan Region: Poland

Kurdistan Region–Poland relations are bilateral relations between Kurdistan Region (Note: While Kurdistan Region refers to the autonomous Kurdish region in Northern Iraq, Iraqi Kurdistan is a geographical term referring to the Kurdish area of Iraq) and Poland. Kurdistan Region is represented in Poland through a representation in Warsaw since 2004, while Poland has a consulate general in Erbil since 2012. In 2005, Polish prime minister Marek Belka, Foreign Minister Adam Rotfeld, Minister of National Defense Jerzy Szmajdziński and Minister of Culture Waldemar Dąbrowski met Kurdish president Masoud Barzani and Prime Minister Nechirvan Barzani in Erbil and stated their support for the reconstruction of Iraq, including Kurdistan Region.

== History ==
During a meeting with head of the KDP Foreign Relations Office, Polish diplomat Beata Pęksa said that relations between Poland and Kurdistan dated back to the 1940s, when Polish forces were stationed in the Kurdistan Region during the Second World War. She added that the Polish forces had a positive experiences with the local population.

In 1991, humanitarian aid and a medical mission was organized in Kraków, Poland, for Kurds who fled Iraqi troops. In 1992, the Polish–Kurdish Friendship Society was founded in Kraków, later turned into the Kurdish Information and Documentation Center.

When Poland joined the American-led invasion of Iraq in 2003, it wanted to have responsibility for the northern parts of the country including Kurdistan Region, mostly due to the security of the region. Eventually, Poland acquired responsibility for the Multinational Division Central-South (Polish zone in Iraq), but good relations with Kurdistan Region became a result of the Polish involvement in the war. In the first years after Kurdistan Region achieved autonomy in 2005, Poland had a careful policy towards the region, for the sake of Iraqi territorial integrity and the good relations to Baghdad. Nevertheless, this policy slowly changed with the opening of a Polish consulate in 2012, but can still be seen in the lack of military support for Kurdish soldiers (Peshmerga).

In 2014, the Polish government sent eight tonnes of humanitarian aid to Erbil for the growing number of internally displaced persons. In 2017, after Kurdish Minister of Martyrs and Anfal Affairs Mahmood Salih Hama visited Poland and the state-owned Auschwitz-Birkenau Memorial and Museum, Kurdistan Region and experts from the museum reached an agreement concerning the documentation of the genocide against Kurds. Deputy Marshal of the Sejm Stanisław Tyszka stated that Poland would approve the Kurdish independence referendum held in September 2017.

In 2018, a tree named Kraków was planted in Erbil, capital of the Kurdistan Region, to commemorate the hundredth anniversary of the restoration of Poland's independence.

== Resident diplomatic missions ==
- Kurdistan Region has a representative office in Warsaw.
- Poland has a consulate-general in Erbil.
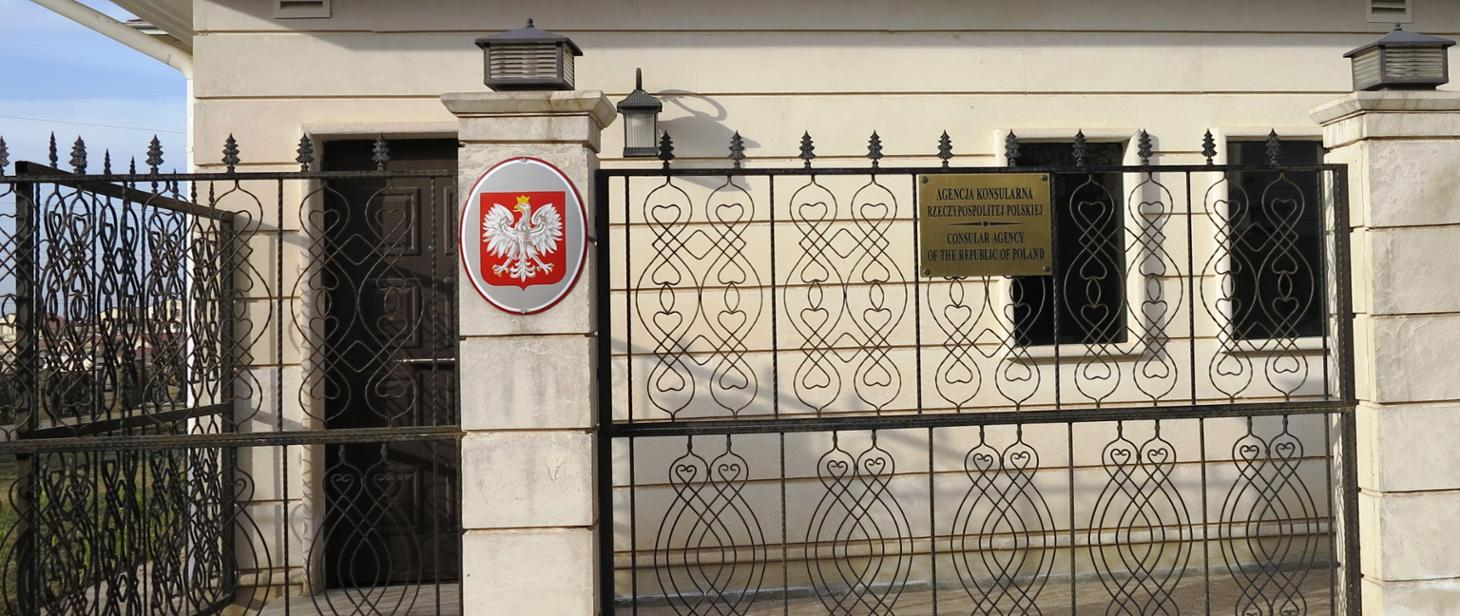
Consulate-General of Poland in Erbil

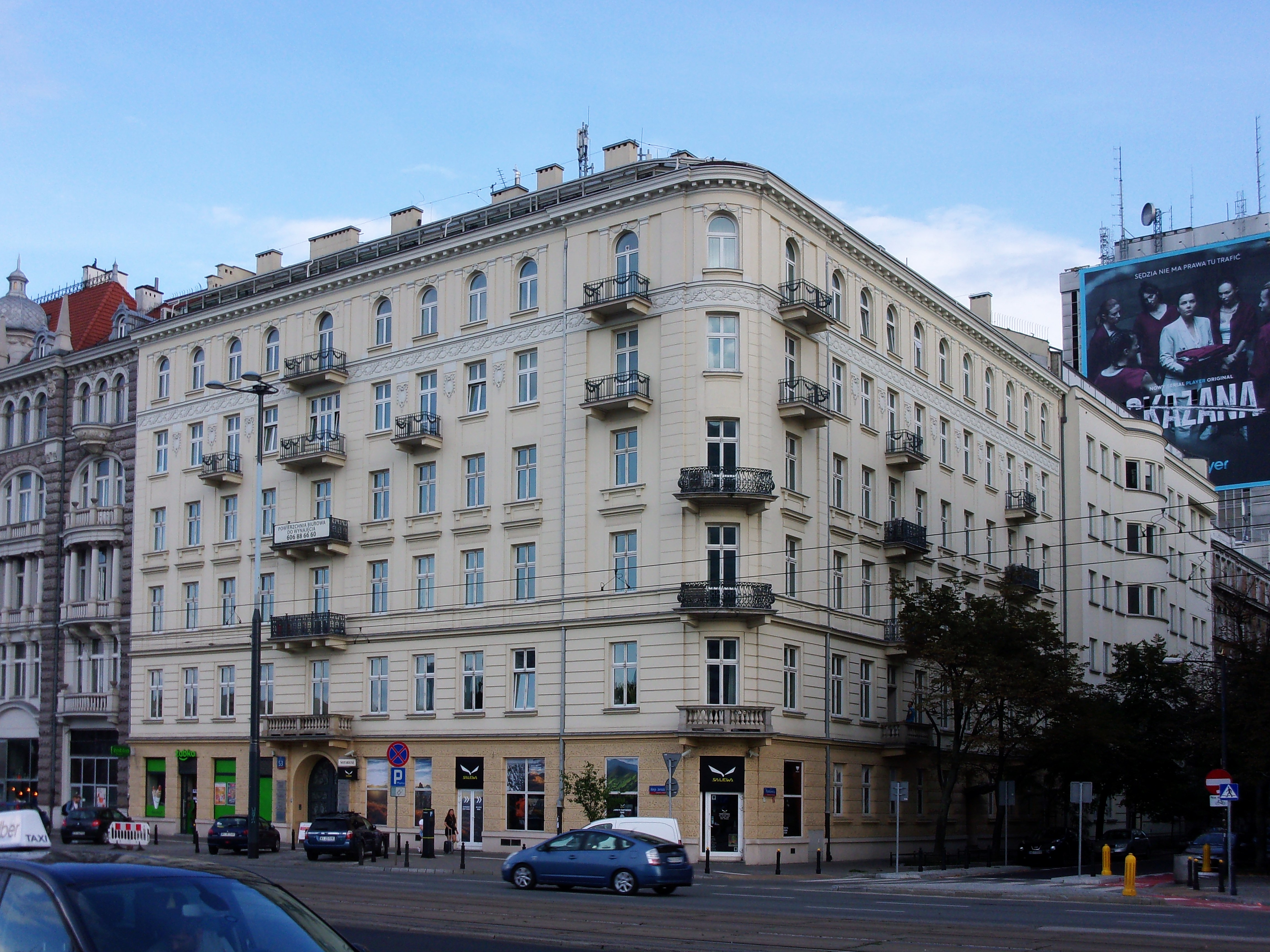
Building hosting the Kurdistan Regional Government Representation in Warsaw

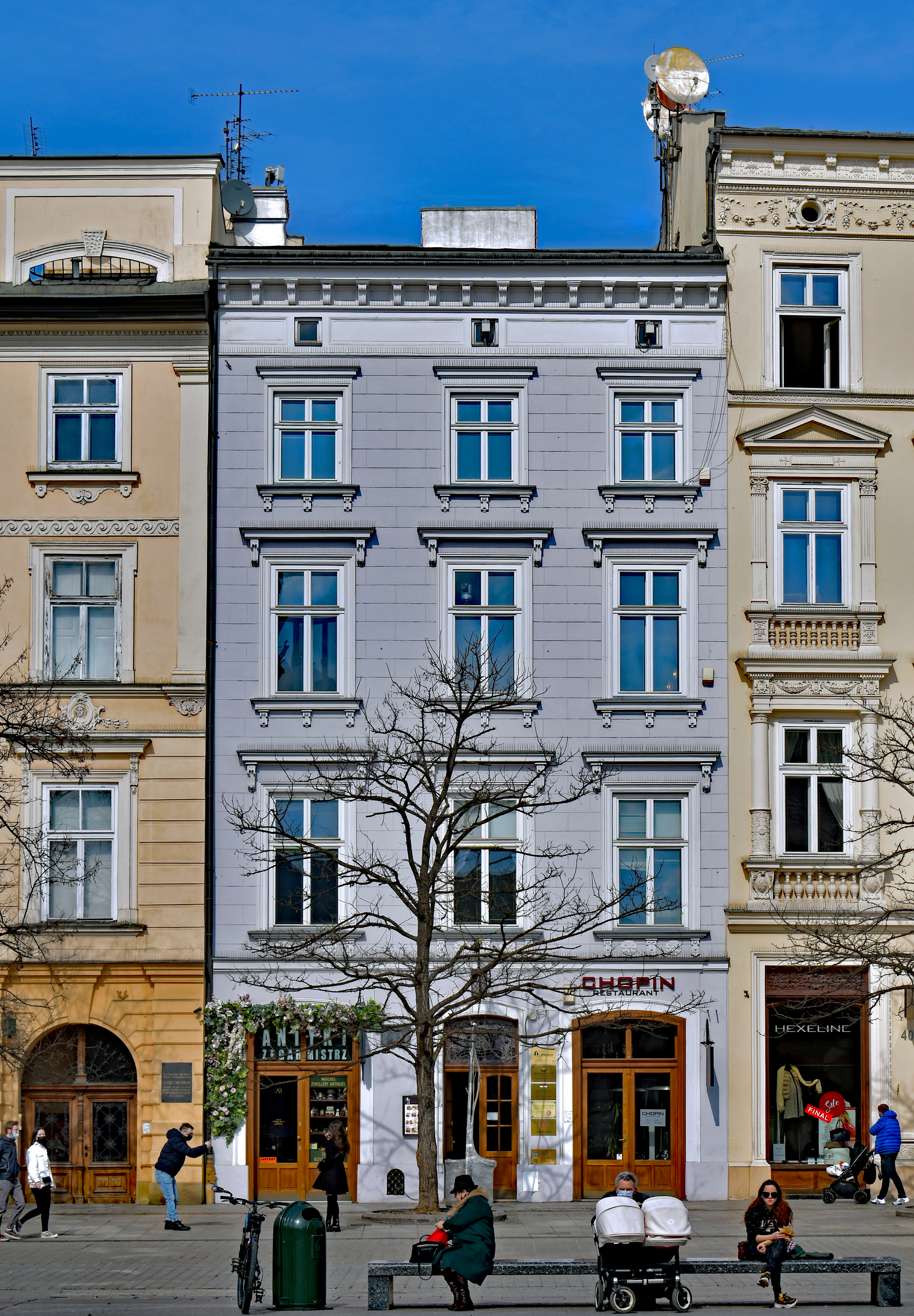
Building hosting the Kurdistan Regional Government Representation in Kraków

== See also ==
- Foreign relations of Kurdistan Region
- Foreign relations of Poland
- Iraq–Poland relations
