= Hungary–Kurdistan Region relations =

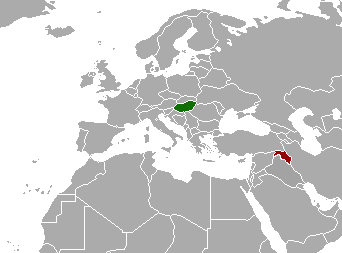

- Hungary: Kurdistan Region

Hungary–Kurdistan Region relations are bilateral relations between Hungary and the Kurdistan Region. (Note: While Kurdistan Region refers to the autonomous Kurdish region in Northern Iraq, Iraqi Kurdistan is a geographical term referring to the Kurdish area of Iraq. They are therefore not identical, though most of Iraqi Kurdistan is incorporated in Kurdistan Region.) Hungary is represented in the Kurdistan Region through a consulate general since November 2014, while the Kurdistan Region has no representation offices in Hungary.

Relations are characterized by several high-level talks and close ties. Massoud Barzani, the president of the Kurdistan Region at the time, visited Hungary in 2012 and in 2015 on official visits. Moreover, Hungarian Prime Minister Viktor Orbán uttered support for the independence of Kurdistan Region from Iraq in 2015 causing concern among the Islamic Supreme Council of Iraq.

Between 2014 and 2018, Hungarian provided military support to the Kurdistan Region, amounting to 250—275 tons of weapons including ammunition, and the Hungarian Chief of Staff of Defense Ferenc Korom used the word "loyalty" to describe the Hungarian-Kurdish military relations. Hungary also took in many Peshmerga fighters for medical treatment in Hungarian hospitals.

The Hungarian oil and gas company MOL Group has been active in the Kurdistan Region since 2007.

== History ==
=== Communist Hungary and Kurdish rebels ===
When Abd al-Karim Qasim ruled Iraq from 1958 to 1963, Communist Hungarian People's Republic began assisting Iraqis and the Kurdish minority with educational matters, and Kurdish students were allowed to study in Budapest. After the Ba'athist takeover in 1963, the First Iraqi–Kurdish War intensified and many of the Kurdish guerillas of Kurdistan Democratic Party were sent for treatment to Hungary. This assistance continued under the Second Iraqi–Kurdish War from 1974 to 1975. In the same decade, Patriotic Union of Kurdistan was founded and held close diplomatic ties to the Hungarian Socialist Workers' Party, both being members of the Socialist International. During the Iran–Iraq War, Hungarian ambassadors in Baghdad occasionally reported back to Budapest regarding the situation of the Kurdish guerillas against Saddam Hussein.

=== Strengthen of relations between Kurdistan Region and Hungary ===
Even though the autonomy of Kurdistan Region was established in 1992, ties between Kurdistan Region and Hungary were not strengthened until the Government of Viktor Orbán in 2012. In that year, Kurdish President Massoud Barzani led a delegation to Hungary, where they met Prime Minister Viktor Orbán, President László Kövér, Foreign Minister János Martonyi, Economic Minister György Matolcsy and Deputy Speaker of Parliament István Jakab to discuss ways to develop cooperation in various sectors, including investment, agriculture, education and energy. After the meeting, President Barzani stated that the meeting was an "important step towards establishing strong bilateral relations", while Martonyi described it as of "historical significance". The following year, Kurdish Foreign Minister Falah Mustafa visited Hungary to meet State Secretary at the Ministry of Foreign Affairs Zsolt Németh to discuss political, economic, cultural, and educational ties. Hungarian Deputy State Secretary for Global Affairs Péter Wintermantel visited Erbil in April 2014, while a memorandum of understanding was signed between the two parties in November 2014.

In this period, the Hungarian multinational oil and gas company MOL Group opened an office in the Kurdish capital of Erbil and has since developed a major oil field and purchased Kurdish oil. In 2016, MOL Group reached a deal with Kurdistan Region to relinquish its share in Akri-Bijeel block.

== Military aid to Peshmerga ==
After the so-called Islamic State (ISIS) entered Iraq and captured Mosul during the Northern Iraq offensive, Hungary began aiding Kurdish soldiers (the Peshmerga) militarily. In August 2014, Hungary dispatched over 50 tonnes of ammunition to the Peshmerga, while 116 Hungarian soldiers were sent to Kurdistan to train the Peshmerga in September 2015. In December 2015, Minister of Foreign Affairs and Trade Péter Szijjártó visited Kurdistan and pledged humanitarian aid worth US$300 million, whilst visiting the Hungarian soldiers stationed there. Hungarian Defence Minister István Simicskó visited Kurdistan in May 2016 to discuss the war against ISIS and the ties between Hungary and Kurdistan. During his trip, he announced that 110 types of advanced weapons would be sent to Kurdistan. Hungary has also taken in dozens of Peshmerga for medical treatment. In November 2018, a Peshmerga delegation went to Hungary to expand the administrative and medical assistance. In the subsequent month, A delegation led by Chief of Staff of Hungary's defense Ferenc Korom visited Kurdistan to discuss the continuation of military support.

== Cultural relations ==
To strengthen the ties between Hungary and the autonomous region, the main street in Rawanduz was renamed after the Hungarian revolutionary leader Lajos Kossuth. An anthology of Kurdish poems was also published in Hungarian by the state-funded Balassi Institute. In January 2017, Kurdistan Region offered scholarships for Hungarian students. Hungarian archeologists have also explored Kurdistan, with a geodetic survey of the Castle of Dwin near Erbil and an excavation mission in 2018 at Grd-i Tle in Ranya Plain. Hungary has also assisted in the rebuilding of the Chaldean Catholic Mariyama Private Elementary School through a donation of $700,000. The Hungarian Minister of Human Resources Zoltán Balog visited the region for the inauguration.

In December 2018, Hungarian broadcaster ATV Spirit and Kurdish broadcaster Rûdaw signed an agreement to cooperate and share information on the coverage of the region.

== See also ==
- Kurd, Hungary
