= Austria–Kurdistan Region relations =

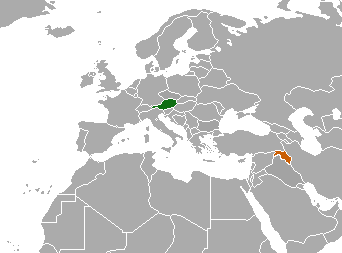
- Austria: Kurdistan Region

Austria–Kurdistan Region relations are bilateral relations between Austria and the Kurdistan Region (Note: While Kurdistan Region refers to the autonomous Kurdish region in Northern Iraq, Iraqi Kurdistan is a geographical term referring to the Kurdish area of Iraq). Austria is represented in Kurdistan Region through a commercial office in Erbil since 2006, while Kurdistan Region has a representation in Vienna since 2012.

== History ==
Kurdish rebel leader Mustafa Barzani met with the later Austrian Foreign Minister Bruno Kreisky in 1957 in Moscow. Ties between Austria and Kurdistan Region intensified in the 1970s when Austria granted asylum to Kurdish refugees from Iraq. Kurdish representative in Austria Mustafa Ramazan Goran stated that: "During these difficult times throughout the 1980s, the Austrian government never wavered in their support." As the new leader of Kurdistan Democratic Party, Masoud Barzani visited Vienna in 1979, where he escaped an assassination attempt. During the general elections of 1992 in Kurdistan Region, Austria sent a high-ranking delegation to observe the elections.

After the so-called Islamic State (ISIS) entered Iraq and captured Mosul during the Northern Iraq offensive, Austria decided to send 1.25 million dollars to the Kurdish government to cope with the growing number of Internally displaced persons.

== High level visits ==
Kurdish President Masoud Barzani has met the Austrian President Heinz Fischer on three occasions in Vienna; in 2011, 2014 and in 2015 on official visits. Austrian Foreign Minister Sebastian Kurz visited Erbil in 2015 and 2016 to boost ties and humanitarian aid.

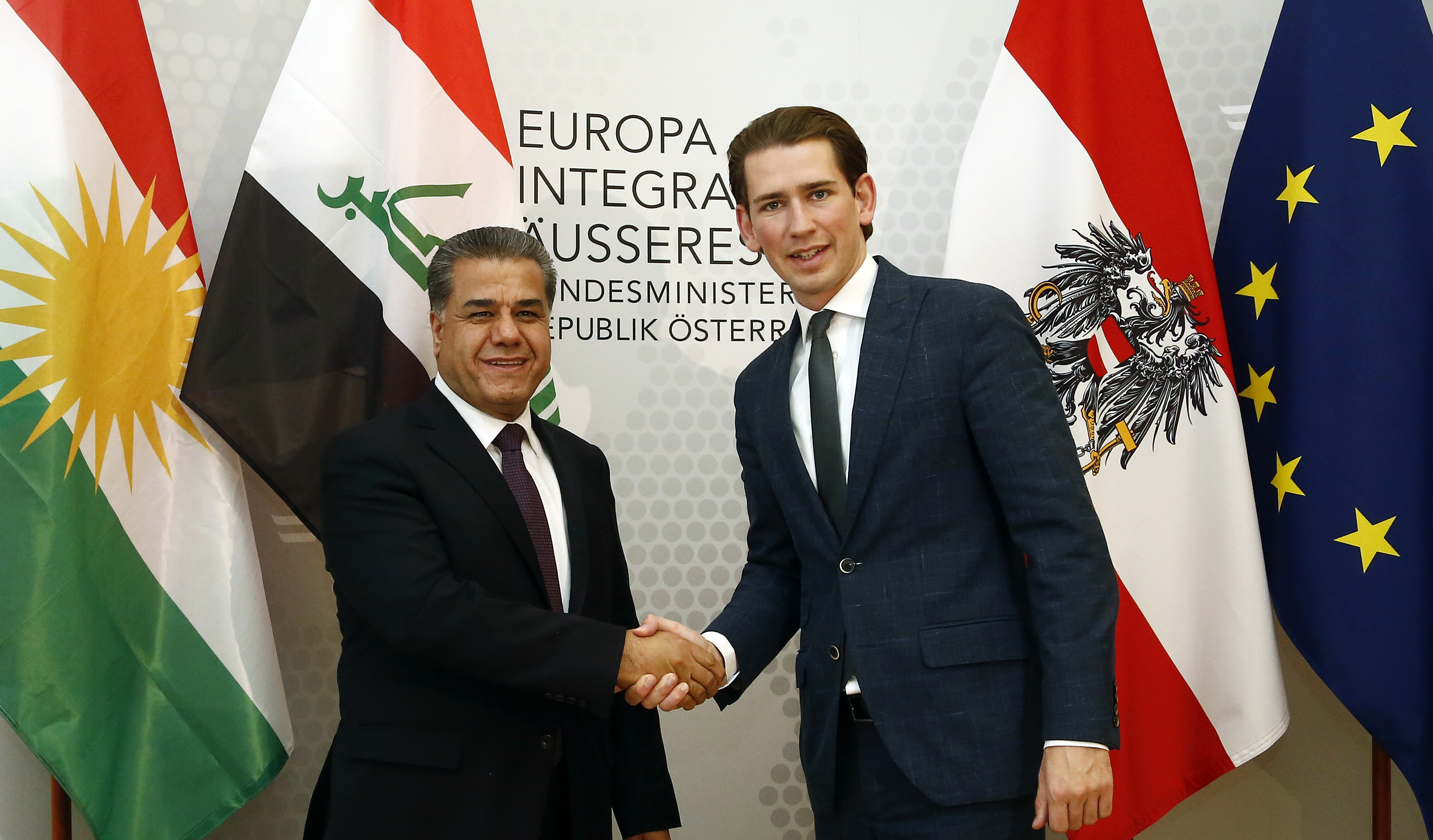
Kurdish Foreign Minister Falah Mustafa meets his Austrian counterpart Sebastian Kurz in 2015

== See also ==
- Foreign relations of Austria
- Foreign relations of Kurdistan Region
- Kurds in Austria
- Attempted assassination of Massoud Barzani
