= Kurdistan Region–Romania relations =

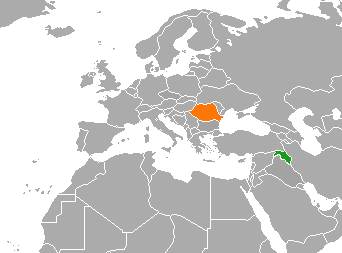
- Kurdistan Region: Romania

Kurdistan Region–Romania relations are the bilateral relations between Kurdistan Region (Note: While Kurdistan Region refers to the autonomous Kurdish region in Northern Iraq, Iraqi Kurdistan is a geographical term referring to the Kurdish area of Iraq.) and Romania. Ties between Romania and the Kurdistan date back to the mid-20th century when Romanian leader Nicolae Ceaușescu held meetings with Kurdish rebels fighting the regime of Saddam Hussein.

While Kurdistan Region has no representation in Romania, the latter has a consular office in Erbil since 2012 when Romanian Foreign Minister Titus Corlăţean visited Erbil to inaugurate it. Corlăţean stated that: "Romania is keen to strengthen relations with Iraq, and this consulate will have a significant role in strengthening the relations between Romania and Iraq and the Kurdistan Region." The Patriotic Union of Kurdistan stated that the Romanian representation would strengthen economic, scientific and cultural ties between the two parties. In October 2013, Kurdish Foreign Minister Falah Mustafa Bakir visited Bucharest with an Iraqi delegation.

In 2012, the first Kurdish–Romanian economic forum was held in Erbil, hosting a Romanian trade delegation composed of many Romanian companies. The Romanian ambassador to Iraq, Jacob Prada stated that: "The good relationship between Romania and Iraq, and Romania and the Kurdistan Region, has been there for a long time. What the Romanian government has been able to do today with the assistance of the KRG is to enable Romanian and Kurdish businessmen to enjoy increased cooperation."

In 2015, Romanian Foreign Minister Bogdan Aurescu met with Mustafa Bakir at the Globsec 2015 in Bratislava, where they discussed bilateral ties and Aurescu stated that Romania is ready to reconstruct Kurdistan Region. Furthermore, they discussed strengthening ties in the fields of energy, oil and gas, infrastructure, agriculture, transportation, Information technology and education. At the GLOBSEC 2016, Aurescu's successor, Lazăr Comănescu met with Falah Mustafa and discussed bilateral ties as well.

As support for Kurdistan Region as they fight ISIS, Romania has treated 10 wounded Kurdish soldiers (Peshmerga) and 400 Yezidi Kurds received psychotherapeutic and medical help in Romania. In August 2016, 82 tonnes of Romanian ammunition were sent to Kurdistan Region.

== See also ==
- Foreign relations of Kurdistan Region
- Foreign relations of Romania
