= Italy–Kurdistan Region relations =

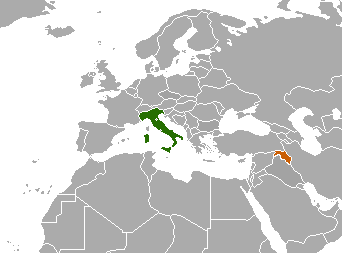
- Italy: Kurdistan Region

Italy–Kurdistan Region relations are bilateral relations between Italy and the Kurdistan Region. (Note: While Kurdistan Region refers to the autonomous Kurdish region in Northern Iraq, Iraqi Kurdistan is a geographical term referring to the Kurdish area of Iraq) Italy has a consulate general in Erbil, while Kurdistan Region has a representation in Rome. Relations are described as "strong" and Italy has a military presence in Kurdistan Region. About 800 Italian soldiers were present in Kurdistan in 2018.

== History ==
Many high-level meeting have been held between Italy and Kurdistan Region. In November 2005, Kurdish President Massoud Barzani visited Italian Prime Minister Berlusconi in Rome, and again in 2009. In September 2012, President Barzani met with the Italian Foreign Minister Giulio Terzi in Rome to discuss economic and cultural ties. Barzani visited Italy again in May 2014, meeting Foreign Minister Federica Mogherini. Three months later, Prime Minister Matteo Renzi visited Erbil to strengthen political and military ties. In February 2020, Kurdish President Masrour Barzani was received by Italian President Giuseppe Conte to discuss regional security and economic relations.

The two parties signed an environmental agreement in July 2017, aimed at assisting the Kurdish government with technology concerning climate change.

Prime Minister Giorgia Meloni visited Kurdistan Region in late December 2022 to meet Kurdish counterpart and moreover the Camp Singara military base where Italian soldiers are staying.

=== Italian military aid to Kurdistan ===
In December 2015, Prime Minister Renzi decided to dispatch 450 Italian soldiers to Kurdistan Region, to protect Kurdish-controlled Mosul Dam as it underwent reconstruction by the Italian company Trevi Sp.A. Furthermore, Italian soldiers have trained about 7,000 Kurdish soldiers, as of January 2017. Regarding military aid, Italy has sent 100 machine guns, an undisclosed amount of anti-tank missiles and a Boeing CH-47 Chinook helicopter to Kurdistan. Other aid include 2,000 rocket propelled grenades and one million rounds of ammunion, which Italy seized from a vessel bound to blockaded Serbia in 1994. Kurdistan Region is also the base for 8 Italian helicopters; four Agusta A129 Mangustas and four NHIndustries NH90s. In April 2017, the Italian Consul General Serena Muroni stated that Italy would receive 11 wounded Kurdish soldiers for proper medical treatment.

During her trip to Erbil in July 2015, Italian Defence Minister Roberta Pinotti stated that "Italy stands behind Kurdistan in the “common challenge” of fighting the Islamic State group".

In 2018, Kurdish President Nechirvan Barzani visited Italy and met with Defense Minister Lorenzo Guerini.

== See also ==
- Foreign relations of Italy
- Foreign relations of Kurdistan Region
