= List of representative offices of Kurdistan Region =

Diplomatic missions of Iraqi Kurdistan Kurdistan Region within Iraq States hosting representative office of Kurdistan Region

This article lists the representative offices of Kurdistan Region, autonomous region of Iraq. The Kurdish presence abroad has grown significantly since 2007. The KRG currently has representative offices in 13 countries and a mission to the EU.

Iraqi constitution guarantees the right of the Kurdistan Region to continue its practice of maintaining representative offices abroad in order to promote its economic, cultural and educational interests. Some countries are of particular importance to the KRG because of its longstanding relationship with them, because of their political and economic status, or because a significant portion of the Kurdish diaspora resides within their borders. The primary responsibilities of these representative offices are promoting international awareness and interest in regional politics, culture, economics, education, and business and investment opportunities. Additionally, given the large number of Iraqi Kurds living abroad, the KRG representative offices also assist with some legal services such as the ratification and authentication of documents belonging to members of Kurdish diaspora overseas, for use within the Kurdistan Region, in coordination with the Iraqi Ministry of Foreign Affairs. The KRG representative can also grant power of attorney and assist in helping people of the Kurdistan Region living abroad to obtain legal counsel in the Region.

== Americas ==
- United States
  - Washington, D.C. (Representative office)

== Asia ==
- Iran
  - Tehran (Representative office)

== Europe ==
- Austria
  - Vienna (Representative office)
- France
  - Paris (Representative office)
- Germany
  - Berlin (Representative office)
- Italy
  - Rome (Representative office)
- Poland
  - Kraków (Representative office)
- Russia
  - Moscow (Representative office)
- Spain
  - Madrid (Representative office)
- Sweden
  - Stockholm (Representative office)
- Switzerland
  - Bern (Representative office)
- United Kingdom
  - London (Representative office)

== Oceania ==
- Australia
  - Sydney (Representative office)

== Multilateral organisations ==
- European Union
  - Brussels (Mission to the European Union)

== See also ==
- Foreign relations of Kurdistan Region
- List of diplomatic missions in Kurdistan Region
