= Germany–Kurdistan Region relations =

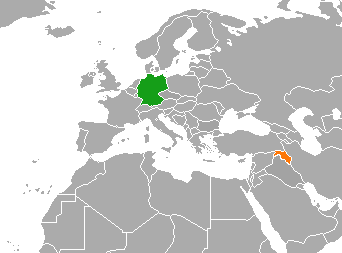

- Germany: Kurdistan Region

Germany–Kurdistan Region relations are bilateral relations between Germany and Kurdistan Region (Note: While Kurdistan Region refers to the autonomous Kurdish region in Northern Iraq, Iraqi Kurdistan is a geographical term referring to the Kurdish area of Iraq). Germany has a consulate general in Erbil since 2012, and Kurdistan Region has a representation in Berlin since 1992. Many high-level meetings have been held between the two parties, including a visit to Berlin by Kurdish President Masoud Barzani in 2009, where he met with German Chancellor Angela Merkel and Foreign Minister Frank-Walter Steinmeier. In 2014, President Barzani described Germany as "one of Kurdistan Region’s staunch allies in the war against the Islamic State." German Consul General Marc Eichhorn described the relations as "excellent".

== History ==
In 1992, the Kurds of Iraq established a mission in Berlin, establishing direct contacts with the German government. Furthermore, the mission had to coordinate humanitarian and development aid from Germany to the Kurdish region, and informed the German public and media about the general situation in Kurdistan.

=== Strengthening of ties and German aid to Kurdistan Region (2014-2017) ===
To combat Islamic State's advance into Northern parts of Iraq, the German government decided to aid the Kurdish soldiers (Peshmerga) militarily. Steinmeier stated that: "We cannot on the one hand praise the Kurdish security forces, pat them on the back for fighting ISIS on behalf of all of us, then when they ask for help just say ‘see how you get on’". The first dispatched aid containing non-lethal military equipment was sent in August 2014. In early September that year, Germany sent lethal equipment and logistics support including assault rifles, machine guns, pistols, anti-tank weapons, night-vision devices and radios. Aid which was enough to equip 4,000 Kurdish soldiers. Germany also established a military liaison team in Erbil to coordinate the distribution of the aid. This delivery amounted to 89 million dollars and was received by Kurdish authorities on 5 September. On 28 September 2014, German Defence Minister Ursula von der Leyen went to Erbil and stated that Germany would continue to support the Kurdish soldiers, and German soldiers commenced the training of Kurdish soldiers in October that year.

In January 2015, Defence Minister von der Leyen visited Kurdistan Region again and visited a camp where German soldiers trained Kurdish soldiers, where she commented the training and reassured that Germany would support Kurdistan further. During the Munich Security Conference in February 2015, Barzani met with Merkel and German Defence Minister von der Leyen to discuss the military aid for the Kurdish soldiers. In May 2015, Germany chose to send 500 more MILAN anti-tank guided missiles, 30 rocket launchers, panzerfaust rockets, G-3 and G-36 assault rifles and ammunition. From April to May 2015, five planeloads of military aid was dispatched for Kurdistan Region. In October 2015, Defence Minister von der Leyen stated that 4,700 Kurdish soldiers had been trained. In January 2016, Germany opened a training base in Erbil to train more Kurdish soldiers.

In August 2016, the German government mulled to send more military aid to Kurdistan Region, as a spokesperson from the German defense ministry stated that 70 tonnes of weapons had already been sent. The shipment was received by Kurdish authorities in early November 2016. German Foreign Minister Sigmar Gabriel met with President Barzani in April 2017 praising the Kurds' efforts against ISIS.

== See also ==
- Foreign relations of Germany
- Foreign relations of Kurdistan Region
- Germany–Iraq relations
