= Bulgaria–Kurdistan Region relations =

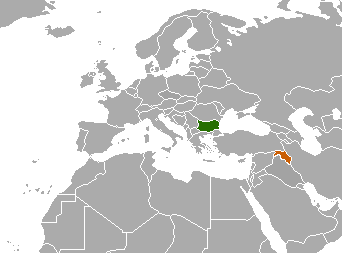

- Bulgaria: Kurdistan Region

Bulgaria–Kurdistan Region relations are bilateral relations between Bulgaria and the Kurdistan Region. (Note: While Kurdistan Region refers to the autonomous Kurdish region in Northern Iraq, Iraqi Kurdistan is a geographical term referring to the Kurdish area of Iraq. They are therefore not identical, though most of Iraqi Kurdistan is incorporated in Kurdistan Region.) Bulgaria is represented in Kurdistan Region through a commercial office in Erbil since 2014, while Kurdistan Region has no representation in Bulgaria. In 2012, Kurdish President Massoud Barzani travelled to Bulgaria on an official visit and met with Bulgarian President Rosen Plevneliev and Prime Minister Boyko Borisov. In May 2017, President Barzani met with Prime Minister Boyko Borisov on an official visit to Bulgaria.

== Early ties with Communist Bulgaria ==
In 1959, Bulgaria and Iraq signed a cultural agreement, allowing Iraqi students to study in Bulgaria. 190 Kurds of Iraq studied there. In the early 1960s, the Bulgarian government uttered support for Kurdish rights and meant that Kurds had a right to exist and to practice and develop their national culture. Kurdish leader Mustafa Barzani visited Bulgaria in 1960.

Bulgaria expressed support for improved relations between the government of Iraq and the wider Kurdish population of Iraq, and applauded the Kurdish declaration on 2 November 1963, which expressed a peaceful resolution with Baghdad. In the early 1970s, ties between Kurdistan Region and Bulgaria strengthened, beginning with a visit by a Bulgarian Agrarian National Union-delegation led by Georgi Andreev to Kurdistan. The delegation met with Mustafa Barzani who stated that Bulgaria and the other socialist European counties had healthy ties with Kurdistan Region. In July 1970, a Kurdistan Democratic Party delegation led by party secretary Habib Karim visited Sofia after being invited by the Fatherland Front, while a delegation from the Fatherland Front led by Gruda Atanasov visited Kurdistan Region to visit Mustafa Barzani in October same year. A KDP-delegation also attended the Fatherland Front congress of April 1972, where the delegation leader Darik Kamil Akrayi said that they were trying to expand relations between the two "countries" on the basis of anti-imperialism. In October 1972, a delegation from the Bulgarian Communist Party travelled to Iraq and visited the Kurdistan Democratic Party in the Kurdish region. In this period, Bulgaria continued giving scholarships to Kurdish students, thus supporting the creation of a Kurdish intelligentsia that would lead the Kurdish struggle for liberation. According to Bulgarian historian Nadia Filipova, the Kurdish resistance in Iraq was not a major issue for the Eastern bloc.

== Strengthening of ties and Bulgarian aid ==
In 2008, Kurdistan Region imported small arms and ammunitions from Bulgaria without Iraqi consent. While Kurdish officials argued that Kurdistan needed weapons to fight Islamists, Bulgaria declined to comment on the shipment. Later on, the spokesman for the Foreign Ministry Dragovest Draganov denied that this transaction ever took place, while the Kurdish government denied it as well. In 2012, Bulgarian Deputy Prime Minister Simeon Djankov visited Kurdistan to develop the cooperation in especially financial, cultural and agricultural sectors. In 2013, Bulgarian Foreign Minister Nickolay Mladenov visited Kurdish Prime Minister Nechervan Barzani in Erbil. In 2014, Bulgarian Deputy Minister of Economy and Energy Krassin Dimitrov visited Erbil to strengthen bilateral relations and to pave way the opening of a Bulgarian consulate in the region. Later that year, when ISIS invaded Iraq in summer 2014, Bulgaria decided to send military aid to the Kurdish soldiers (Peshmerga). The aid constituted of gun machines and cartridges worth 6 million lev. In 2015, Foreign Minister of Kurdistan Region Falah Mustafa met the Bulgarian Foreign Minister Daniel Mitov at Globsec 2015, expressing a will to deepen the ties. Mustafa and Mitov held a meeting at Globsec 2016 as well.

== See also ==
- Foreign relations of Bulgaria
- Foreign relations of Kurdistan Region
- Bulgaria–Iraq relations
