= France–Kurdistan Region relations =

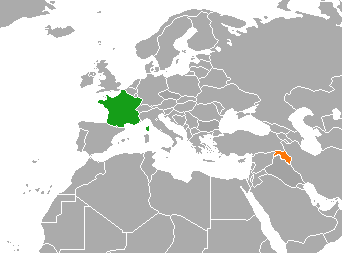
- France: Kurdistan Region

France–Kurdistan Region relations are bilateral relations between France and Kurdistan Region, a semi-autonomous federal region of Iraq. (Note: While Kurdistan Region refers to the autonomous Kurdish region in Northern Iraq, Iraqi Kurdistan is a geographical term referring to the Kurdish area of Iraq) France has a consulate general in Erbil and Kurdistan Region has a representation in Paris. The ties between France and Kurdistan Region have been very close since the presidency of François Mitterrand (1981–1995), when his wife Danielle Mitterrand played an instrumental role in the campaign for the no-fly zone over the Kurdistan Region in 1991. France has a military presence in the Kurdistan Region, and Consul General Dominique Mas described their relations as being "historic" and "long-term".

== History ==
=== Mitterrand (1981–1995) ===
In 1982, First Lady Danielle Mitterrand played an active role in the formation of the Kurdish Institute of Paris by making public awareness around it. In 1989, she organized that 1,000 Kurdish refugees would be taken in by France with consent from the President and the government. She also visited Kurdistan Region in 1991, visiting refugees at the Iran-Iraq border, and again in July 1992 to witness the establishment of the Kurdistan Region Parliament. In 2011, Jonathan Randal wrote that: "In France, Danielle Mitterrand, the former President’s wife and vociferous defender of the Kurds and other downtrodden minorities, needed no encouragement to bring their plight to her husband’s attention. When in late March 1991 the Iraqi counteroffensive gathered steam, she alerted specialists inside and outside the government to prepare contingency plans. She had been sensitized to the Kurds by, among others, Bernard Dorin, a diplomat who abruptly gave up his career to work for the Kurds without knowing much about them."

=== Chirac (1995–2012) ===
In an interview with L'essentiel in 2012, Kurdish President Massoud Barzani stated that Kurdistan Region had no direct relations with President Chirac, but had contacts to several ministers including Minister of the Interior Nicolas Sarkozy.

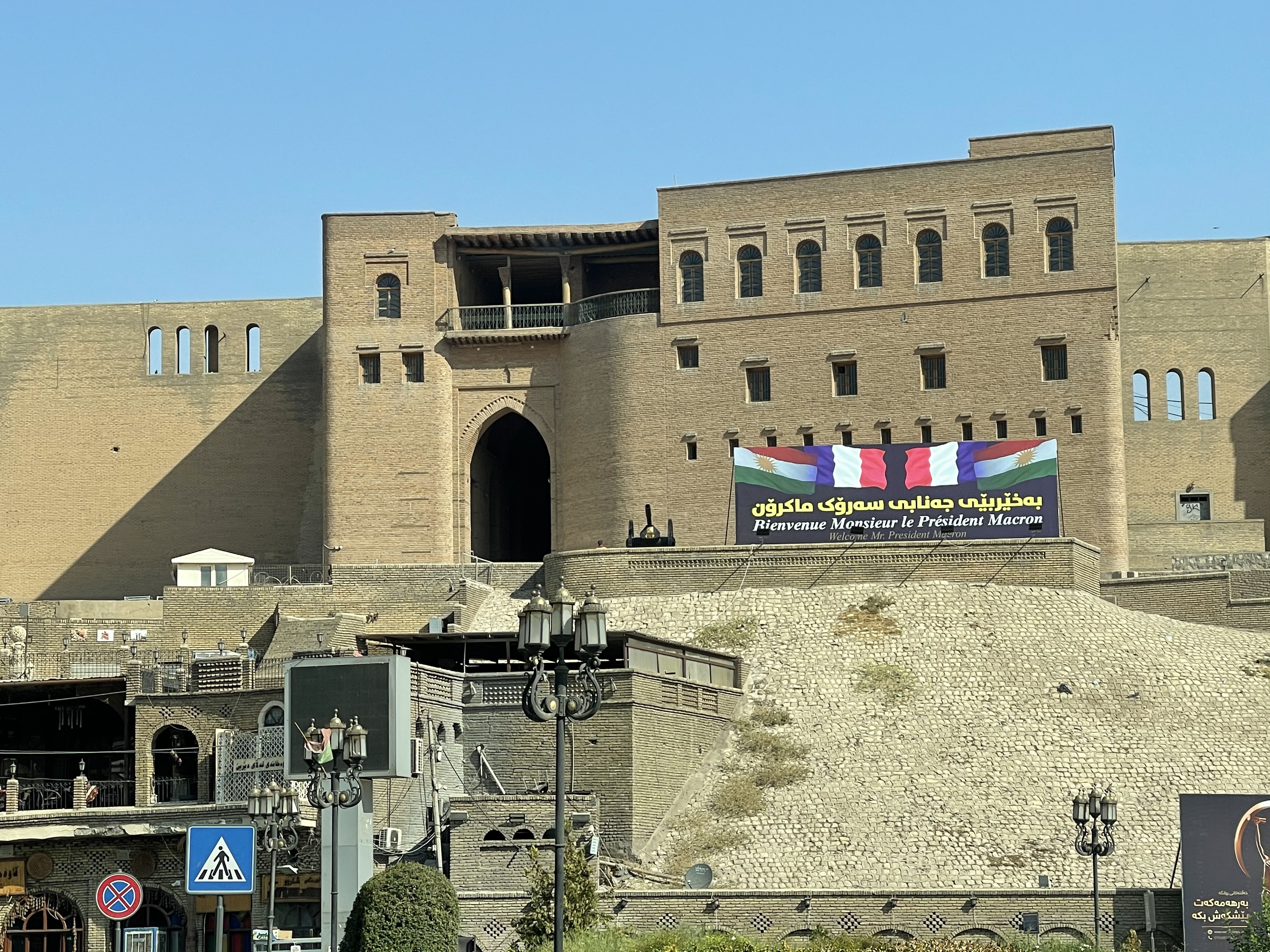
Banner welcoming President Emmanuel Macron on the Erbil Citadel for his visit in August 2021.

=== Sarkozy (2007–2012) ===
Under the presidency of Sarkozy, a French embassy office was opened in Erbil with the presence of French Foreign Minister Kouschner. In 2010, Kouschner described Sarkozy's approachment to the Kurds as being a revitalizing of their relations. In the same year, Massoud Barzani met with President Nicolas Sarkozy and Foreign Minister Bernard Kouchner in Paris, where they signed a protocol strengthening ties in various fields, including trade, education and culture. Sarkozy commented at the relations and stated that: "France is happy with its friendship with Kurdistan and attaches great importance to this friendship."

=== Hollande (2012–2017) ===
Kurdish President Massoud Barzani has met with French President François Hollande in Paris on three occasions; in 2014, 2015 and in 2016, while Hollande visited Erbil in 2014 and 2017. French Defence Minister Jean-Yves Le Drian met Kurdish officials twice in 2016, once at the Munich Security Conference and once in Erbil.

==== Military aid ====
In August 2014, France sent soldiers to Kurdistan Region to train Kurdish soldiers (Peshmerga). In January 2015, 40 more soldiers were sent to the region. In August 2014, France also supplied Kurdish soldiers with an undisclosed amount of weapons and 20 tons of humanitarian aid. In early February 2015, a Kurdish military delegation led by Minister of Peshmerga Sayid Qadir met with Hollande to discuss military cooperation. French Defence Minister Jean-Yves Le Drian made an unannounced visit to Erbil in April 2016, where he stated that: "I also came here to meet with the Kurdistan Region President Masoud Barzani and Prime Minister Nechirvan Barzani to reiterate the support of France to Peshmerga forces in the fight against Da’esh,” and furthermore that: “The Peshmerga plays an important role in this fight." In June 2016, two shipments of military aid reached Kurdistan Region consisting of MM89 rockets, thousands of different types of ammunition, defense and attacking grenades and night-vision goggles.

== See also ==
- France–Iraq relations
