= Rojava–Kurdistan Region relations =

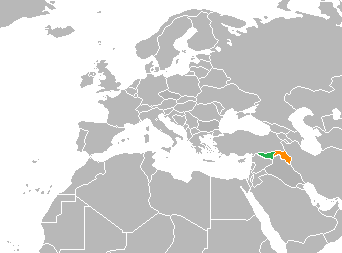
- Democratic Autonomous Administration of North and East Syria: Kurdistan Region

Kurdistan Region Rojava

The relationship between the Democratic Autonomous Administration of North and East Syria and the Kurdistan Region refers to the political and cultural relationship between the Democratic Autonomous Administration of North and East Syria (also known as Rojava) in Syria and the Kurdistan Region in Iraq. These relations continued until the integration of Rojava into the Syrian state in 2026.

While they shared much culturally, they also had many political differences. There had been military cooperation with the Kurdistan Region and the United States in the conflict against the Islamic State, although neither gave official support for Rojava or its People's Defense Units (YPG). The Kurdistan Regional Government enforced a unilateral economic blockade against Rojava which damaged and limited the region's economy. The "Sultanistic system" of Iraqi Kurdistan stood in stark contrast to the democratic confederalist system of the Rojava.

The dominant political party in Rojava, the Democratic Union Party (PYD), was a member of the Kurdistan Communities Union (KCK) organisation. Although KCK member organisations in the neighbouring states with autochthonous Kurdish minorities are either outlawed (as in Iran and Turkey) or politically marginal with respect to other Kurdish parties (as in Iraq), the PYD-governed NES region had acquired the role of a model for the KCK political agenda and blueprint in general.

There was much sympathy for Rojava, in particular among Kurds in Turkey. During the Siege of Kobanî, a large number of ethnic Kurdish citizens of Turkey crossed the border and volunteered in the defence of the town. Upon their return to Turkey, some of these took up arms in the renewed Kurdish–Turkish conflict, where skills acquired by them during combat in Kobanî brought a new quality of urban warfare to the conflict in Turkey.

Like the KCK umbrella in general, and even more so, the PYD was critical of any form of nationalism, including Kurdish nationalism, putting them at odds with the Kurdish nationalist visions of the KDP-sponsored Kurdish National Council in Rojava.

== See also ==
- Foreign relations of the Democratic Autonomous Administration of North and East Syria
- Foreign relations of Kurdistan Region
- Rojava conflict
- Syrian civil war
- Iraq–Syria relations
