= Kurdistan Region–Kuwait relations =

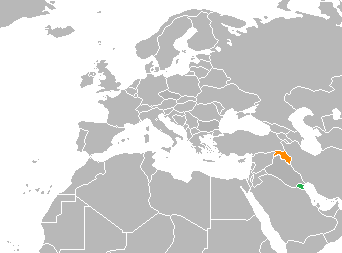

- Kuwait: Kurdistan Region

Kurdistan Region–Kuwait relations are bilateral relations between the Kurdistan Region (Note: While Kurdistan Region refers to the autonomous Kurdish region in Northern Iraq, Iraqi Kurdistan is a geographical term referring to the Kurdish area of Iraq) and Kuwait. While Kurdistan Region has no representation in Kuwait, the latter has a consulate general in Erbil, the capital city in the Kurdistan Region of Iraq, since 2015. Relations were described as a 'historic friendship' and 'brotherly in 2018, and as "deep-rooted" in 2022. Kuwait has substantial economic investments in the Kurdish region which amounted to over $2 billion in 2017.

Politically, Kuwait is interested in establishing close relations to Kurdistan, especially since it could fragment Iraq more, which would reduce the threat of a second invasion.

== High-ranking meetings ==
In 2013, Kurdish President Barzani visited Kuwait City and met with the Emir of Kuwait Sabah Al-Ahmad Al-Jaber Al-Sabah In 2015, a Kuwaiti governmental delegation visited Kurdistan and met with the Kurdish President Masoud Barzani. In 2017, Kuwait responded to the Kurdish independence referendum by expressing their concern about the referendum breaching the Iraqi constitution or damage Iraqi–Kurdish relations. In November 2018, Barzani visited Kuwait again and met with the Emir of Kuwait Sabah Al-Ahmad Al-Jaber Al-Sabah and Defence Minister Nasser Sabah Al-Ahmad Al-Sabah to discuss the regional political developments.

After Nawaf Al-Ahmad Al-Jaber Al-Sabah was announced Emir of Kuwait in September 2020, the Emir and the Kurdish President held talks in October that year.

== See also ==
- Iraq–Kuwait relations
