= Kurdistan Region–Palestine relations =

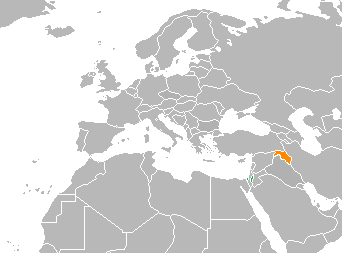

- Palestine: Kurdistan Region

Kurdistan Region–Palestine relations (Arabic: علاقات فلسطين وكردستان; Kurdish: پەیوەندییەکانی کوردستان و فەلەستین) covers the diplomatic, political, and cultural relations between the autonomous Kurdistan Region and the State of Palestine led by the Palestinian Authority.

The Palestinian Authority has had a diplomatic representation in the Kurdistan Region via a General Consulate, and is one of the first Arab governments to have relations with Kurdistan. The president of Kurdistan described the opening of the consulate as a positive step, as "an historical day for the two brotherly and persecuted nations." Ambassador Khudhouri commented, "And here today, we are opening this consulate to continue our historical relations."

== Political relations ==
In April 2009, Mahmoud Abbas visited Baghdad, where he held talks with Jalal Talabani. A week later, Abbas visited Erbil and met Masoud Barzani, becoming the first foreign head of state to visit the Kurdistan Region. Abbas stated "we did not need any invitation to visit this brotherly nation and we have felt for a long time that the doors were always open to us without even needing to make an appointment, the honourable president Barzani was not even told of our visit until 24 hours beforehand." Barzani stated "we are used to our Palestinian brothers always being in the forefront of aid of our people in the past and present, this visit will cement the relationship between our two peoples with their similar suffering. Just as he is the first president to visit the region, we expect and we hope that the Palestinian consulate will be the first consulate to open in Erbil."

On November 29, 2011, the Palestinian government opened its general consulate in Kurdistan Region in Erbil. Nadhmi Khudhouri, the first Palestinian consul general to Kurdistan, described the opening of the consulate as a "great achievement" for the Palestinian people. The ambassador also claimed that Kurds supporting Israel was just "propaganda" and stated "what I feel here is that Kurds support Palestine." He also stated that "our great leader Yasser Arafat had good relations with Mullah Mustafa Barzani, and later with Masoud Barzani and Jalal Talabani. What we have in common is that we both are victims of the Sykes–Picot Agreement of 1916. It led to Israel occupying Palestine, and to the division of Kurdistan", he refuted claims of Palestinians being Ba'athists, stating "all Arab governments were supporting us. The PLO had asked them to support the Palestinian revolution, and Iraq was just one of them. Palestinians should not pay for that relation, as they were not looking for war, but for their land and its independence. Tunisia is not rich, but paid for Palestine, so did Yemen, Algeria, all Arab governments. We had the support from all Arabs. We had Arab soldiers who paid in blood for Palestine. Yet, at the same time that our leader Yasser Arafat had a relation with Saddam Hussein, he also had one with Mullah Mustafa Barzani."

During the 2017 Kurdistan independence referendum, when Nouri al-Maliki claimed that an independent Kurdistan would be a "second Israel", Taysir Khalid, a DFLP official, stated that "whatever the choice and the results and repercussions of the referendum were, the comparison between Kurdistan and Israel is an unfair comparison and must be rejected from the first place for many reasons, perhaps the most important of which is that the Kurds in northern Iraq and in the region in general are not an invasive or foreign people, but they are an authentic and great people who lived in the land of their fathers and grandfathers and preserved their authentic identity, heritage, history and civilization, and had contributed to the defense of our region in the face of foreign ambitions and invasions, while Israel is completely different, it is a country formed in the context of a colonial process imposed on the region from outside by colonial countries, still messing in this region."

Although Saeb Erekat strongly opposed Kurdish independence and referred to it as a "poisoned sword against Arabs" in 2017, Nechirvan Barzani sent condolences after Erekat's death.

In 2021, there was a conference in Erbil of over 300 Iraqis, including many Sunni Arab tribal leaders, who called for an Iraqi-Israeli peace deal. The Kurdistan Region claimed that they were not informed about and did not give permission for the conference, while the PUK criticised the conference, "whether held in the Kurdistan Region or in Iraq" and claimed they support "the just cause of Palestine."

Kurdish politicians, including Masoud Barzani and Adham Barzani, announced their support for Palestine during the 2021 Israel–Palestine crisis. In 2023, during the Gaza war, Nechirvan Barzani stated his support for an independent Palestinian state. Also in 2023, the Barzani Charity Foundation sent aid to Gaza thru Egypt. In 2024, Nechirvan Barzani reiterated that "the Kurdistan Region supports the creation of an independent Palestinian state."

While the Kurdistan Region maintains formal diplomatic ties with the Palestinian Authority, its government has not been vocal in supporting the Palestinian cause, and public support for Palestine within the region has appeared limited compared to other parts of the Arab world.

== Cultural relations ==
In April 2012, the Iraqi Kurdistan national football team was invited to participate in the 2012 Palestine International Cup. The KFF held an emergency meeting and eventually decided to let the team participate. Salam Hussein, the KFF Secretary, said "We finally decided to let the team participate in the Palestine competition after we found out that the competition will not coincide with the VIVA World Cup".
