= Venus Faiq =

Iraqi-Dutch writer, poet, and translator

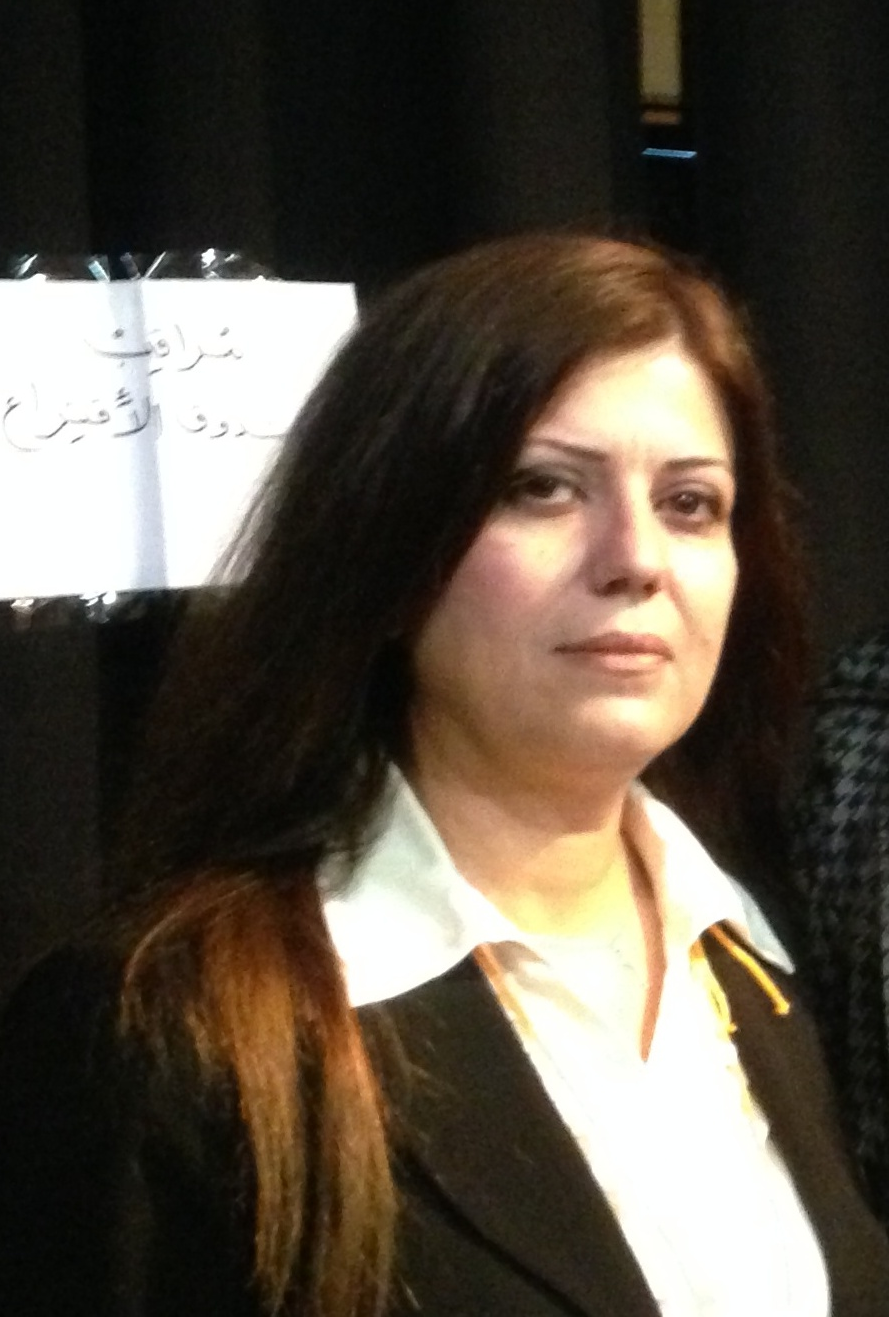
- Born: 1963 (age 62–63); Sulaymaniyah, Kurdistan Region, Iraq
- Education: University of Baghdad
- Occupations: Writer, journalist, poet, editor, translator
- Awards: International Traveling Phoenix Prize for Literary Creativity, Iraq, 2005. Recognition certificate from the International Society of Arab Translators and Linguists, Qatar, 2008. Recognition Award from Walla Press Foundation for Studies, Printing and Publishing, 2009.

Venus Faiq (Arabic:فينوس فائق) (born in 1963) is an Iraqi-Kurdish and Dutch writer, poet, translator, editor, and journalist. Her works includes poetry, articles, in both Kurdish and Arabic languages, as well as working as a volunteer translator for the refugee organization in the Dutch city of Rijswijk.

== Early life and education ==
Venus was born in Sulaymaniyah in the east of the Kurdistan Region of Iraq. She grew up in the city of Oran, Algeria, where she completed her elementary studies in Arabic and French, she later moved to Iraq, where she finished both middle school in Kurdish and preparatory school in Arabic, in Kurdistan.

She continued her education at the University of Baghdad. She earned a Bachelor of Philosophy degree from the College of Arts at the University of Baghdad in 1989. In 1996, she moved from Iraq to the Netherlands. She studied television editing at the Media Academy in the Netherlands in 2004, followed by radio production at Dutch World Radio's Courses Centre in 2005.

== Career ==
As an Arab broadcaster, editor, presenter and translator, she began working for Kurdistan's People Television in Sulaymaniyah, shortly after its founding. In 1993 she worked for the Iraqi opposition newspaper, Al-Mutamar as an editor; while simultaneously working as a correspondent for Al-ittihad newspaper; and writing for the Kurdistan National Union. All of her writing up to that time were in Arabic, but also has published in the Sorani Kurdish dialect.

She began working as an editor and presenter after she moved to the Netherlands, where she joined Radio Foreigners, Kurdish and Arab section, in the Dutch city of Rotterdam. During 2002, she worked for two years in the Department of Relations with Foreign Citizens in governorate on the Municipality of Delft, and then at Al-Hurrah University in Hague, where she was in charge of the Department of Relations and follow-up.

In 2010, she was a supervisor in the software section at Nalia Independent Radio and Television Network in the city of Sulaymaniyah, Kurdistan, Iraq. Her experience in elections includes working as a supervisor in computer networks and managing the Iraq election website outside Iraq, as well as being a supervisor and instructor in electoral station in the first election. During the 2005 parliamentary election, she was a member of the Netherlands supreme committee. In 2015, she worked as a station supervisor during Iraq's parliamentary elections at the polling station in Holland.

Her work has been included in anthologies such as My poetry depicts you: An anthology of contemporary Kurdish poetry (2017), edited by Rebwar Fatah.

== Published works ==
- Beautiful Sins (original title: ālkhāṭāyā ālǧmylā), 2001.
- Concept of Reform in Kurdistan and Reform of the Wing’s Reform (original title: mfhwm āl eṣlāḥ fy kwrdstān wā eṣlāḥ ǧanāḥ āl eṣlāḥ), Dar-Sardam for Printing and Publishing, Kurdistan, 2008.
- Nail Polish (original title: ṭylāaʾ ālāḏāfr), Dar-Al Hadarah for Publishing, Cairo, 2008.
- Faiq, Venus (2013). إتجاهات العشق الأربعة [Four Trends of Adoration] (poetry). Beirut: (Arab House of Sciences Publishers). ISBN 9786140107199.
- Last Samurai (original title: ālsāmwrāy ālākhyr), Arab Scientific Publishers, Beirut, 2013.
- I Will Have a Man From my Right Rib (original title: sā ārzq byrāǧwl mn ḍlʿy ālāymn), Dar Nasher Al-Taif, Baghdad, 2015.
- Last Daughters of God (original title: Ākhr bnāt ālālh), Jamal Irfan Cultural Foundation, Sulaymaniyah, 2016.
