= Holy See–Kurdistan Region relations =

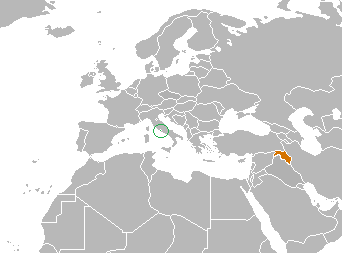
- Holy See: Kurdistan Region

Holy See–Kurdistan Region relations are bilateral relations between Holy See and Kurdistan Region. (Note: While Kurdistan Region refers to the autonomous Kurdish region in Northern Iraq, Iraqi Kurdistan is a geographical term referring to the Kurdish area of Iraq) The Holy See has no representation in Kurdistan Region and the latter has no representation in the Holy See.

== High-ranking visits ==
Kurdish President Masoud Barzani has met with Pope John Paul II and his two successors Pope Benedict XVI and Pope Francis on official visits to the Vatican City in November 2005, February 2011 and May 2014. Kurdish Prime Minister Nechirvan Barzani also met with Pope Francis in March 2015, discussing the humanitarian crisis in the Kurdish region and Barzani stressed his hope for a papal encouragement for the international society to support Kurdistan Region humanitarianly. At the meeting, Pope Francis praised the atmosphere in Kurdistan. Shortly after, Pope made an unspecified donation for Kurdistan Region to cope with the displaced Christian population.

In the same month, the Pope's personal envoy was sent to Erbil, including Cardinal Fernando Filoni and a delegation from the Congregation for the Evangelization of Peoples. It was the envoy's second visit to Erbil after a similar visit took place in August 2014. In 2016, the Pope donated 110,000 dollars to the St. Joseph's Clinic in Erbil, which is home to thousands of internally displaced persons, and sent a financial donation to displaced Iraqi Christians in Erbil through the Aid to the Church in Need.

In March 2016, a Papal delegation led by Archbishop Alberto Ortega Martín and met with President Barzani, expressing the Holy See's gratefulness for Kurdistan Region's treatment of displaced Christians. In January 2018, Nechirvan Barzani met with Pope Francis in Rome, where they addressed the current humanitarian situation in Kurdistan Region, while Cardinal Secretary of State Pietro Parolin visited Kurdistan in December that year. In February 2020, Pope Francis received Kurdish President Masrour Barzani at the Vatican for bilateral discussions.

Pope Francis visited Kurdistan Region in March 2021.
