= Australia–Kurdistan Region relations =

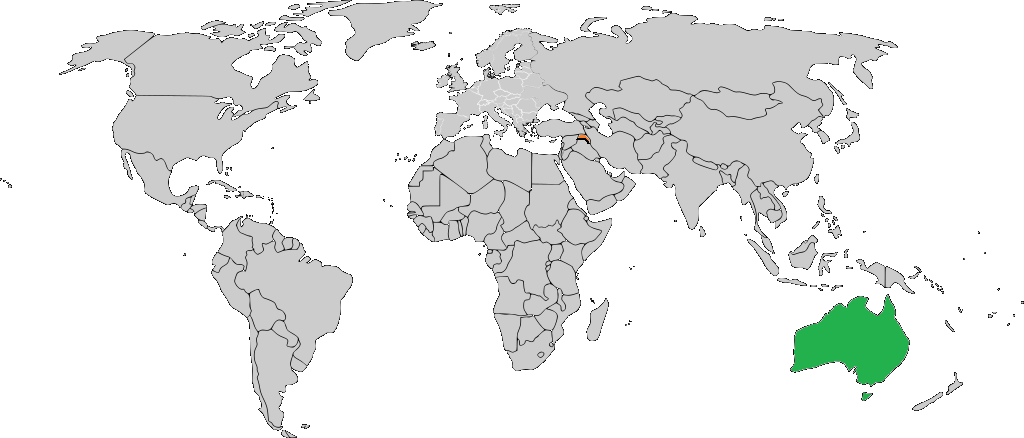

- Australia: Kurdistan Region

Australia–Kurdistan Region relations are bilateral relations between Australia and Kurdistan Region. (Note: While Kurdistan Region refers to the autonomous Kurdish region in Northern Iraq, Iraqi Kurdistan is a geographical term referring to the Kurdish area of Iraq) While Australia has no representation in Kurdistan, Kurdistan has a representative office in Canberra. Moreover, there is a Kurdish lobby in Australia. In late 2014, Australian Prime Minister Tony Abbott authorized the training of the Kurdish soldiers or Peshmerga and also supplied the Kurds with ordnance in September 2014. A C-130J was involved in the airlift of arms and munitions to the Kurdish forces. In April 2016, it was disclosed that an Australian Army Special Operations Task Group personnel were assisting at the "divisional level" embedded with senior Kurdish Peshmerga commanders.

In 2015, Kurdish Foreign Minister Falah Mustafa travelled to Australia and met with Australian Foreign Minister Julie Bishop to discuss the security circumstances in Kurdistan and bilateral relations. Moreover, Mustafa met with Attorney-General George Brandis.

== See also ==
- Kurdish Australians
- Operation Okra
