= Kurdistan Region–Russia relations =

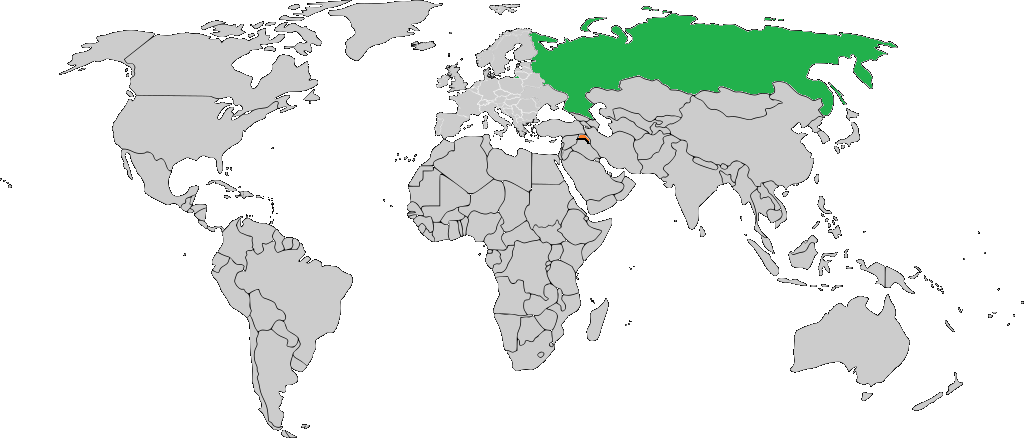
- Russia: Kurdistan Region

Kurdistan Region–Russia relations are bilateral relations between Kurdistan Region (Note: While Kurdistan Region refers to the autonomous Kurdish region in Northern Iraq, Iraqi Kurdistan is a geographical term referring to the Kurdish area of Iraq) and Russia. While Kurdistan Region has a representation in Moscow, Russia has a consulate general in Erbil which opened on 28 November 2007. Relations between the Kurds and the Russians date back to the second half of the 1800s when Russian interest in Kurds because of expansionist ambitions. During the Cold War, the Soviet Union supported the Kurdish rebels against Iraq until the European power withdrew politically from the Middle East in the late 1970s because of the Middle-Eastern backlash from the Soviet invasion of Afghanistan.

After the Cold War, Russia established ties with the newly founded autonomous Kurdistan Region and relations are described as ambivalent and contradictory but Moscow has been sympathetic to the Kurdistan independence movement for decades which also included military support for the Kurds. Today, the two parties mainly cooperate in the energy sector. Unlike most of the other European powers, Russia did not criticize the unilateral 2017 Kurdistan Region independence referendum and continued to invest in the Kurdish region despite growing tensions between Kurdistan and Iraq. This made analysts believe that Russia was attempting to fill the gap which America had created from its criticism of the referendum. Russian President Vladimir Putin met with Kurdish Prime Minister Nechirvan Barzani in June 2017 and in May 2018.

According to Kurdish officials, the Russian investments worth billions of dollars in the 2010s, prevented the Kurds from going bankrupt as a large portion of their budget went to the fight against ISIL.

== Kurdish-Soviet relations (1945-1980s) ==
=== Barzani's exile in the Soviet Union (1945-1958) ===
The Kurdish leader of the nationalist movement Mustafa Barzani went to exile in the Soviet Union in 1945 after the Kurdish rebellion was quelled and remained there for 13 years until he returned to Kurdistan in 1958 to resume the independence campaign. During his exile, he received an education and also established close ties to the KGB and the Soviet Army which generated the belief among Americans that he was a Russian agent. Despite ideological differences and Barzani's nationalist ideology, the Soviets began supporting his men militarily throughout the 1960s and 1970s. During the Cold War, Barzani had close ties to the Soviet Union, believing that an independent Kurdistan could only be established with Soviet support.

=== Military assistance amid ambiguous relations (1958-1980) ===
Just one year after returning to Kurdistan, Barzani returned to Moscow to hold talks with First Secretary Khrushchev wherein the Soviets uttered their support for Kurdish autonomy and willingness to support the Kurds militarily and financially. As Barzani returned from his trip to Russia, he began strengthening his grip on Kurdistan and defeated the Pro-Iraq Kurdish tribes. By 1961, the Kurdish rebels amounted to between 5,000 and 7,000 fighters as Iraq lost all influence in Iraqi Kurdistan. As Iraqi-Kurdish relations deteriorated, the Soviet support for the Kurds was delicate since Iraqi General Qasim was leaning towards communism and any antagonizing move would tilt Iraq towards the United States. When the Ba'athist coup of 1963 took place, the Soviet Union took the opportunity to pressure Iraq to recognize Kurdish rights which resulted in the Iraqi–Kurdish Autonomy Agreement of 1970 in which Baghdad would recognize Kurdish autonomy. However, with the failure of negotiations, the Soviets signed a friendship treaty with Iraq in April 1972 which shifted the Kurdish-Soviet relations to the worse in spite of a high-level meeting between the Kurdistan Democratic Party and the Communist Party of the Soviet Union in August 1972. After the treaty with Baghdad, Moscow stopped publicly mentioning the Kurds. In the second half of 1972, Kurdish and Soviet media began a smear campaign against each other. In 1975, the Second Iraqi–Kurdish War ended when Iraqi forces crushed the Kurdish uprising with Soviet weapons. However, Soviet military support for the Kurds continued even after their collapse in 1975, as Mitrokhin documents confirm that Moscow aided the Kurds in the early 1980s. In the aftermath of the Soviet invasion of Afghanistan, Moscow withdrew from the region politically because of criticism to the invasion.

== Russian return to Kurdistan (2003-) ==
The American invasion of Iraq in 2003 made it possible for the Kurds and the Russians to open a new chapter in their relations. Russia became one of the first countries to open a representation in Kurdistan Region which was inaugurated in 2007, however relations remained unexploited due to fear of Turkish antagonism. The relations are mainly focused on the energy sector as Russian companies have invested billions of dollars in the region during the 2010s. In 2012, Gazprom and Kurdistan Region signed a contract for the exploration and oil production of two oil blocks which later rose to three oil blocks. In February 2017, Rosneft injected $2.1 billion as Russia received its first 600,000 barrels of Kurdish oil in April 2017, while Gazprom signed an agreement with the Kurdish authorities in June 2017 worth $400 million.

ISIL entering Iraq in the spring of 2014, prompted the World to deliver weapons to the Peshmerga. The Russian involvement in the equipping of the Kurdish soldiers was limited to three shipments in total. In the third dispatch, the Russians solely delivered five batches of the Soviet-era ZU-23-2 anti-aircraft.

On the Russian approach to Kurdistan in the 2010s, Russian analyst Barmin argued that:

Russia’s ambivalence about its priorities in Iraq resulted in an odd stance on the Kurdish referendum. In official comments, Russian diplomats openly and repeatedly say they support Iraq's territorial integrity — although apparently not for Iraq's sake, but rather because Iraq's unity is “important for maintaining stability and security in the region and for resolving those critical problems that [abound in this region].” However, the narrative that Russia feeds to Kurdistan is significantly more nuanced. In an August interview with Kurdish media, the deputy head of Russia’s consulate in Erbil made a bold statement that Moscow would “support the decision made by the people of Kurdistan because it is a decision through referendum.

Analyst Varfolomeeva argued that Russia needed Kurdistan to be viable to maintain its business relations and to not antagonize with the region which is why Russia did not criticize the referendum in 2017.

== See also ==
- Republic of Mahabad
