= Canada–Kurdistan Region relations =

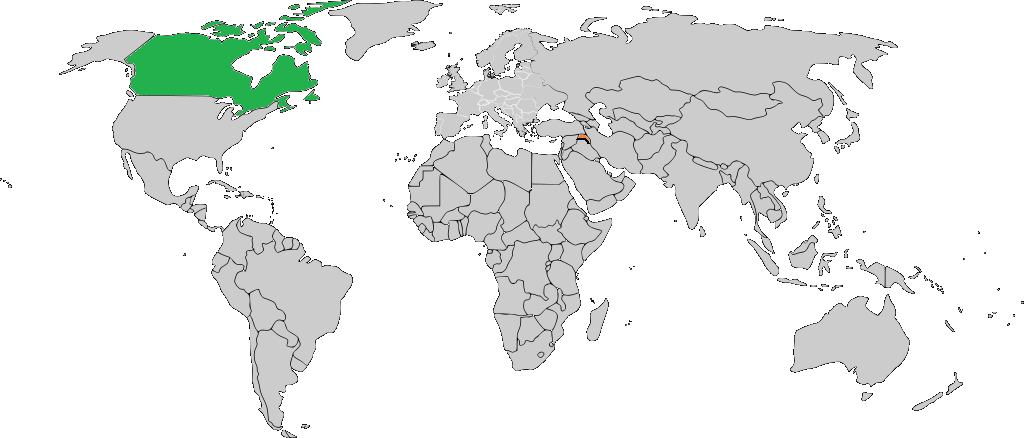

- Canada: Kurdistan Region

Canada maintains bilateral relations with the Kurdistan Region in Iraq. (Note: While Kurdistan Region refers to the autonomous Kurdish region in Northern Iraq, Iraqi Kurdistan is a geographical term referring to the Kurdish area of Iraq) Canada has an embassy office in Erbil, while the Kurdistan Region has no representation in Canada. Diplomatic relations are described as "close" and a "Parliamentary Friends of the Kurds" group was formed in 2016 by MP Tom Kmiec. Canada also had a military presence in Kurdistan Region by training the Peshmerga. This presence ended in 2017, but the Kurdish government has since asked Canada to resume the training.

Canadian Prime Minister Justin Trudeau stated that Canada respected the Kurdish independence referendum in 2017 despite being unilateral.

In July 2016, a controversy occurred regarding the Canadian military uniforms as they included the Flag of Kurdistan and could be interpreted as support for Iraq's disunity. Nevertheless, the Canadian Defense Chief Jonathan Vance decided to keep the Kurdish flag patches. Another such gesture was the hoisting of the Kurdish flag in Toronto on 16 March 2019 to commemorate the Halabja massacre in 1988.

Regarding the oil sector, Six Canadian oil companies were granted license by Kurdistan Region to operate in the region

== Canadian visits to Kurdistan ==
In March 2015, a Canadian delegation led by Robert Nicholson visited Kurdistan to discuss strengthening relations and stated that: "We will continue our support and cooperation with the Kurdistan Region in this difficult time." Canadian Prime Minister Stephen Harper visited the region two months later in May where he met with the Kurdish President Masud Barzani and Prime Minister Nechirvan Barzani and visited the frontline with the so-called Islamic State. In August and November 2015, Richard Fadden, National Security Advisor to the Prime Minister visited Kurdistan as well to discuss bilateral relations. In December 2015, Foreign Minister Harjit Sajjan visited Kurdistan as well having held talks with the Kurdish Foreign Minister Falah Mustafa, while a Canadian military delegation led by Defence Chief Vance met with the Kurdish President in February 2016.
