= Falah Mustafa Bakir =

Iraqi Kurdish politician

- فەلاح مستەفا بەکر
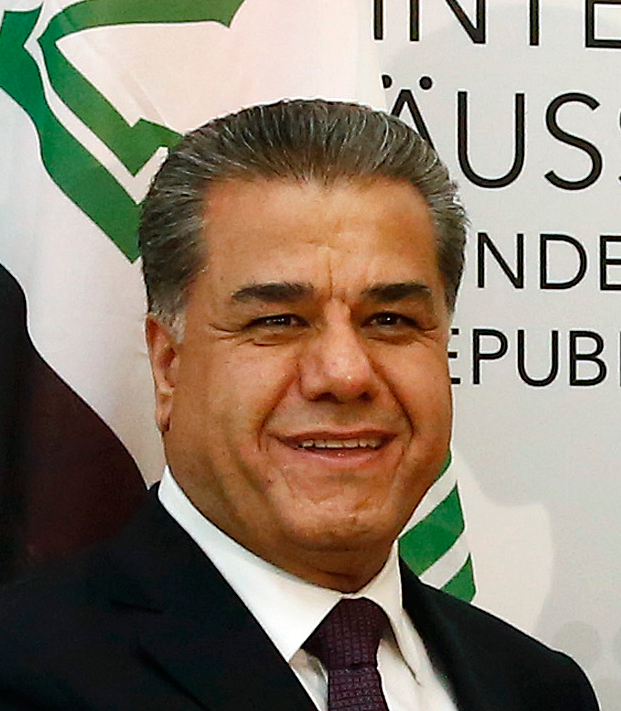
- Falah Mustafa Bakir at a conference in June 2015

Senior Foreign Policy Advisor to the President of Kurdistan Region
- In office August 2019 – Present
- Prime Minister: Nechirvan Barzani

Personal details
- Born: April 2, 1964 (age 62) Erbil, Kurdistan Region, Iraq
- Citizenship: Iraq
- Children: 4
- Education: University of Mosul (undergraduate), University of Bath (graduate in Development Studies), Harvard Kennedy School of Government (Executive Program)
- Alma mater: University of Mosul, University of Bath, Harvard Kennedy School of Government
- Occupation: Politician, Foreign Affairs Expert
- Known for: Senior Foreign Policy Advisor, First Head of the Kurdistan Regional Government (KRG) Department of Foreign Relations
- Cabinet: Cabinet 5-9 (as Foreign Minister)
- Portfolio: Foreign Relations, Policy Advisory

Falah Mustafa Bakir (Sorani Kurdish: فەلاح مستەفا بەکر; born 1964) is a Kurdish politician from Kurdistan Region, Iraq serving as Senior Foreign Policy Advisor to President Nechirvan Barzani with a ministerial rank.

He was appointed to this position in August 2019, after having served as (Minister) the first Head of the Kurdistan Regional Government (KRG) Department of Foreign Relations (DFR) from 2006 to 2019.

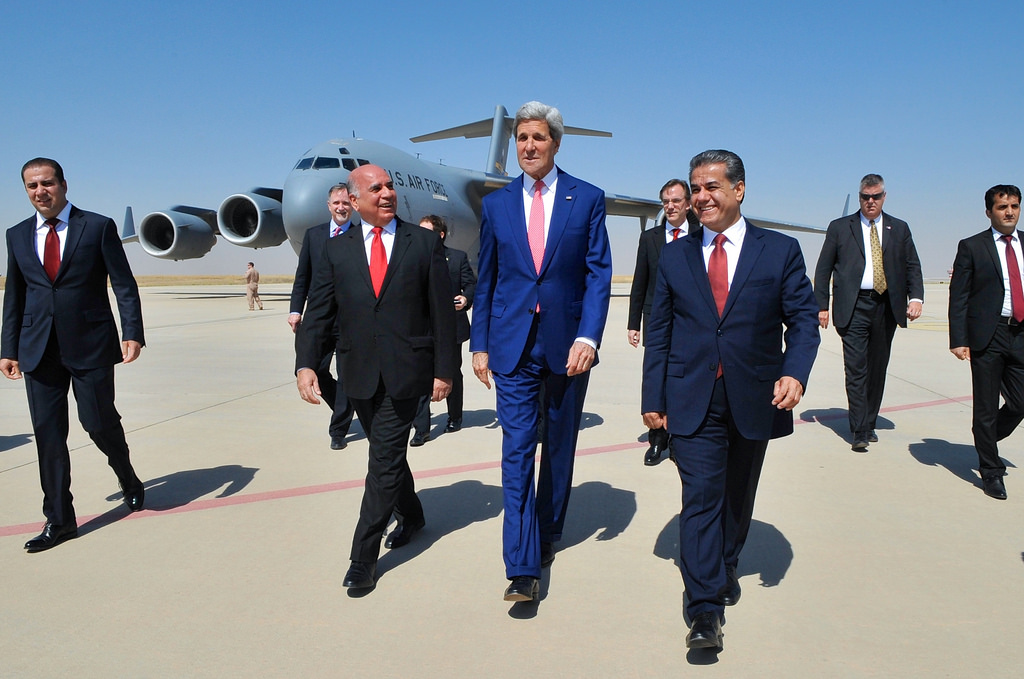
Falah Mustafa and Secretary Kerry Following His Arrival in Iraq

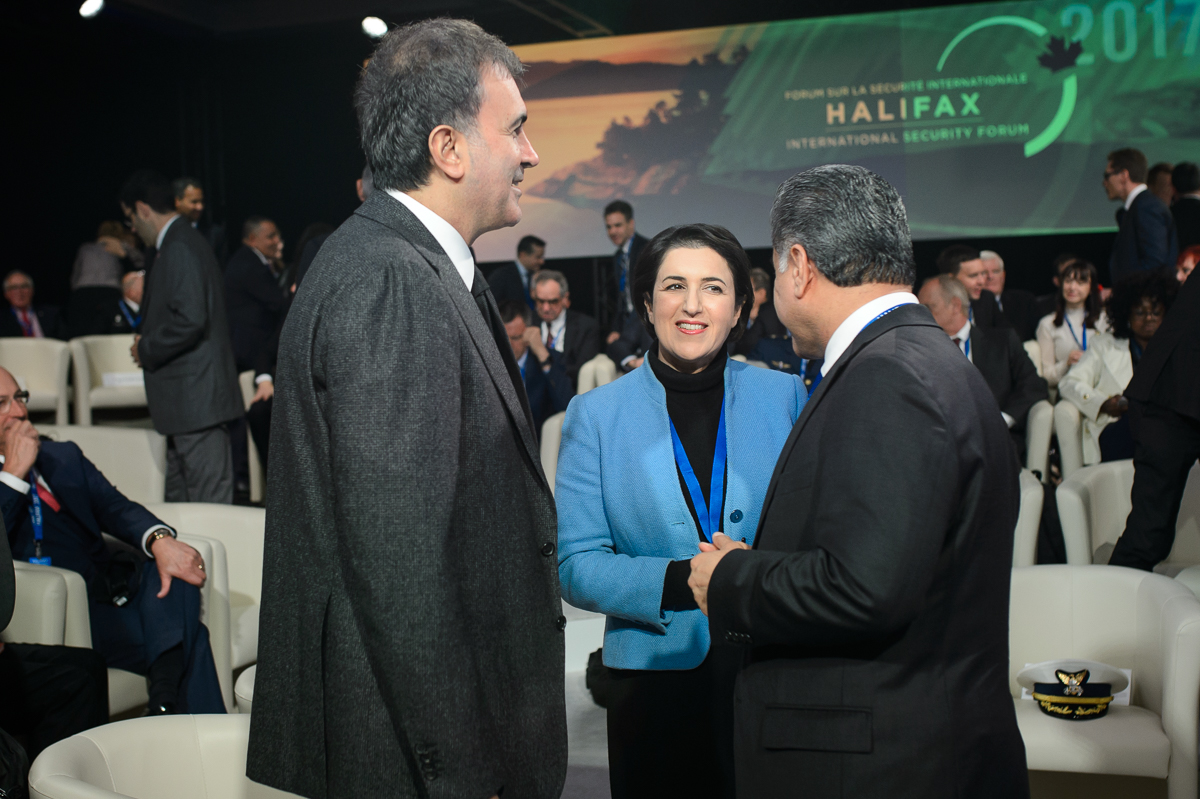
Ömer Çelik, Minister of European Union Affairs of Turkey, with Kurdistan Regional Government Head of Foreign Relations Falah Mustafa Bakir.

== Early life and education ==
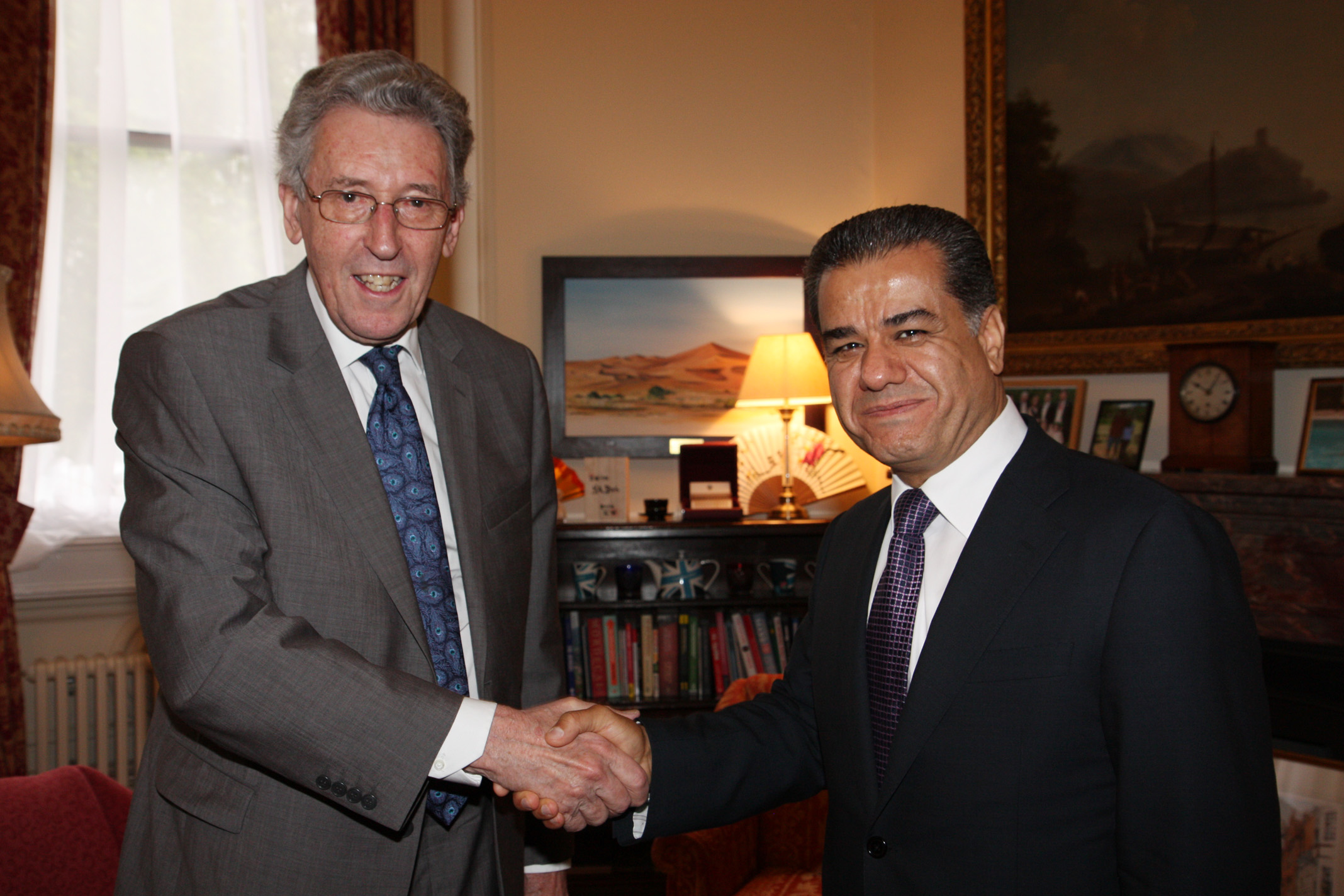
Lord Howell meeting Falah Bakir Mustafa

Falah Mustafa Bakir was born in Erbil in 1964. He obtained his undergraduate degree at the University of Mosul, his graduate degree in Development Studies at the University of Bath, and a senior manager's executive program certificate at Harvard University’s Kennedy School of Government. He is fluent in Kurdish, Arabic, and English.

== Career ==
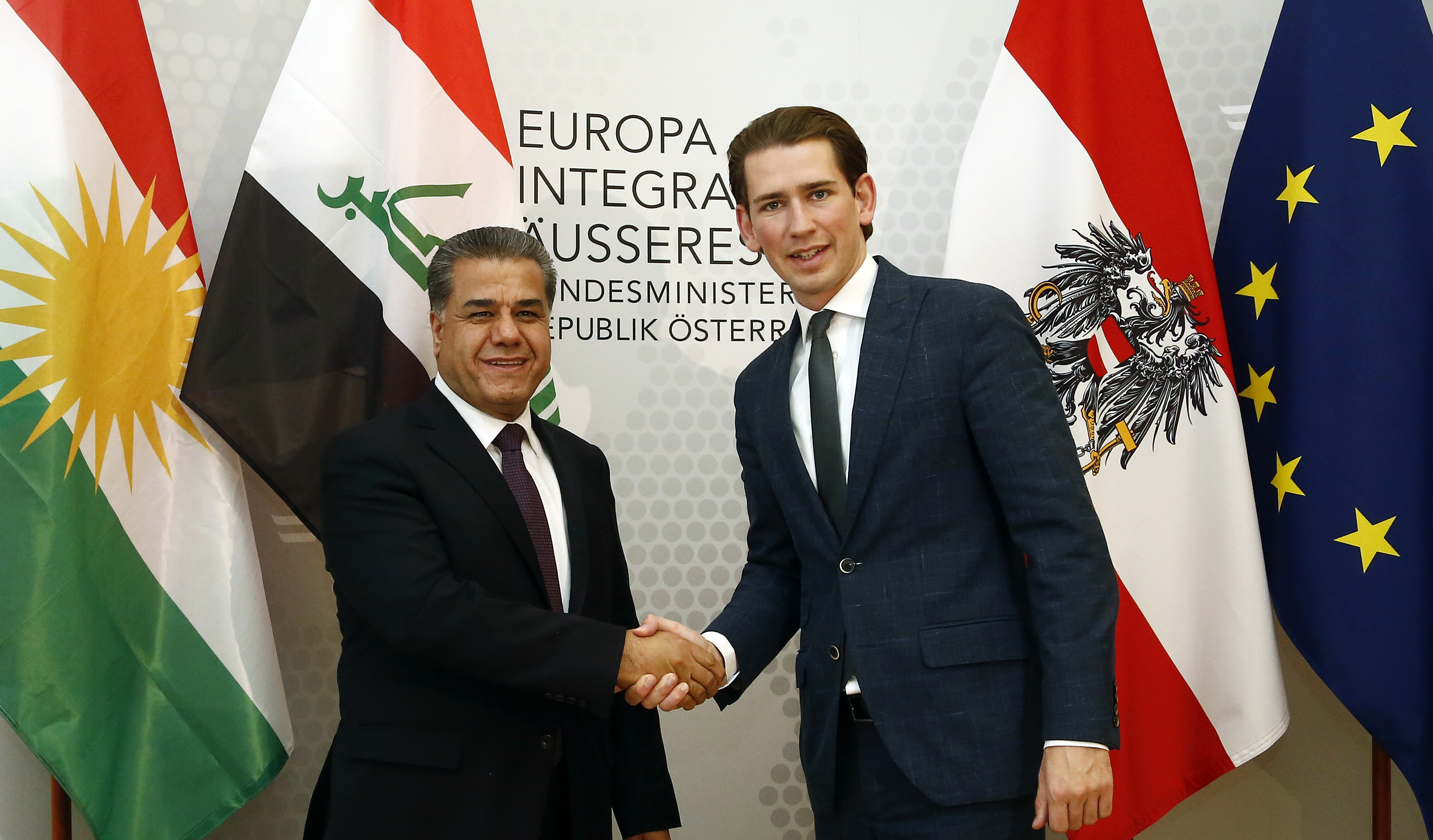
Bakir and Austrian Foreign Minister Sebastian Kurz in June 2015.

In 2006, he created the Kurdistan Department of Foreign Relations, and he has served as its Foreign Minister since then after taking the role in September 2006.

In September 2016, he remained Kurdistan Regional Government's minister of foreign relations. That month he asserted that "if we reach an agreement with Baghdad (on statehood), there may not be a need for a referendum."

In October 2016, he stated publicly that the Peshmerga were suffering casualties due to a lack of air support.

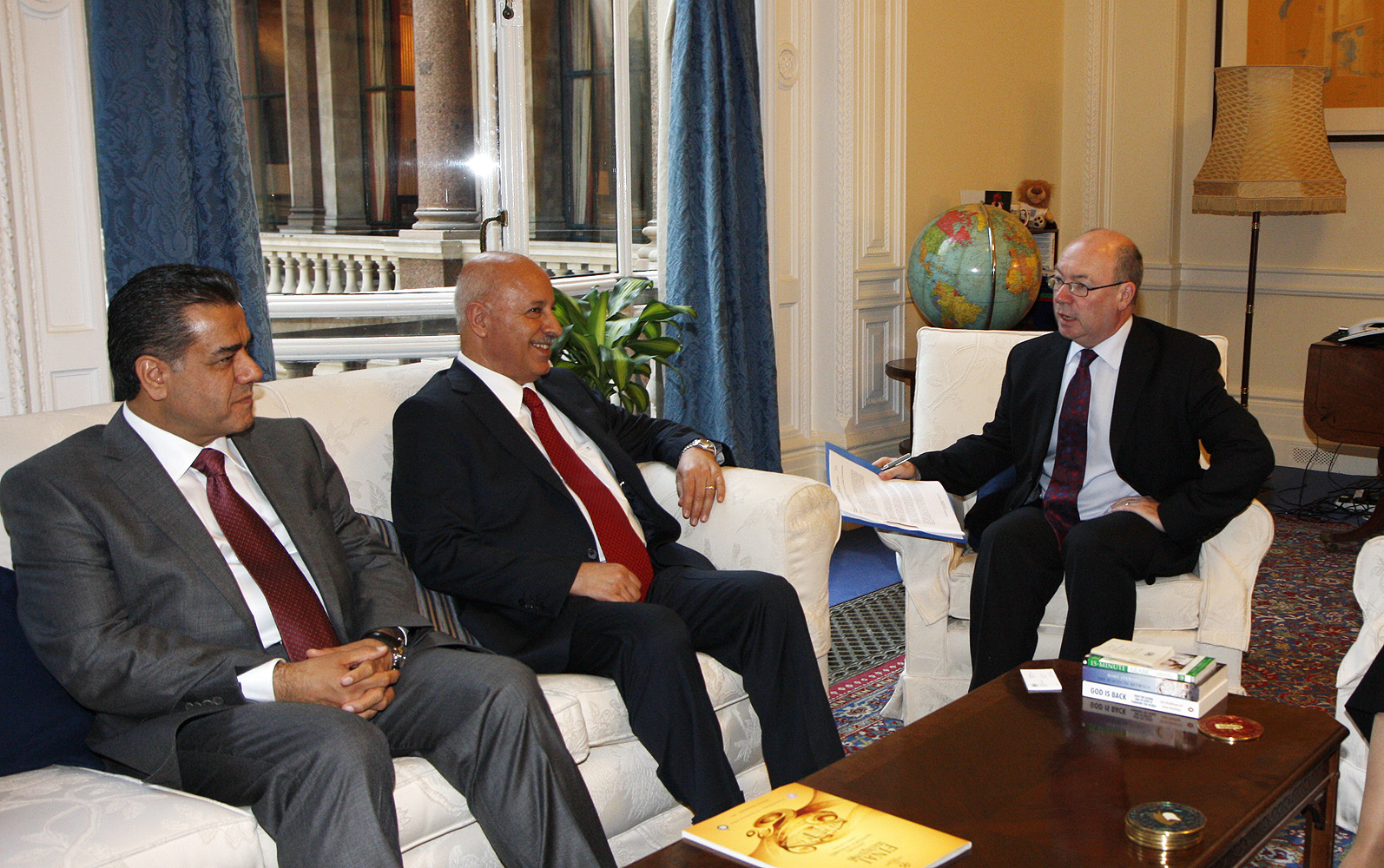
Foreign Office Minister Alistair Burt meeting Minister Falah Mustafa Bakir, Kurdistan Regional Government, Department of Foreign Relations in London, 15 June 2010.

He is a frequent guest lecturer at Salahaddin University and University of Kurdistan - Hewler (UKH) in Erbil.

== Personal life ==
Falah Mustafa Bakir is deeply connected to his Kurdish heritage and enjoys spending time with his family in Erbil, where he lives with his wife and four children. His personal interests include traditional Kurdish music, fine arts, and various sports. He is fluent in Kurdish, Arabic, and English.

== See also ==
- List of current foreign ministers
- List of foreign ministers in 2017
- List of foreign ministers in 2006
- Foreign relations of Kurdistan Region

Political offices
Preceded by Position created	1st Foreign Minister of Iraqi Kurdistan; September 2006-2019	Incumbent
