= Iraqis in Syria =

Regions with significant populations
- Mainly Damascus (Jaramana, Sayyidah Zaynab, Yarmouk), with smaller communities in Aleppo, Homs, Hama, Tartus, Latakia, Deir ez-Zor, Abu Kamal, Hasaka, Qamishli

Languages
- Mesopotamian Arabic, also Kurdish (Sorani and Kurmanji dialects), Turkish (Iraqi Turkmen/Turkoman dialects), and Neo-Aramaic, Assyrian, and Mandaic)

Religion
- Mostly Islam a significant Christianity minority (Syriac Christianity and Catholicism) and a small number of Mandaeism.

Related ethnic groups
- Arabs, Armenians, Assyrians, Mizrahim, Iranians, Azeris, Turkmen

Iraqis in Syria are Syrian citizens of Iraqi origin and Iraqi residents in Syria.

== History ==
Syria has traditionally served as a refuge for exiles and displaced peoples in the region, and notably maintained a pan-Arabist tradition of keeping its borders open to other Arabs since 1960. Since 1948, several waves of Palestinians entered the country, where over 400,000 live today. During the 2006 Lebanon War, around 100,000 Lebanese citizens fled to Syria to find short-term shelter. Syria welcomed several small waves of Iraqis beginning in the 1930s, including exiles from political opposition movements and later Shi'a and Kurds seeking refuge from the Hussein government. Syria closed its border with Iraq in the aftermath of the 1991 Gulf War, though it was re-opened in 1997. By 1999 the flow of Iraqis into Syria resumed, and by 2003 an estimated 250,000 Iraqis had fled to Syria.

The present wave of refugees was sparked by the 2003 invasion of Iraq. The first to leave were officials and military officers with close ties to the former government, followed by people fleeing the violence in Al Anbar Governorate in 2004. At the same time, minority groups (including Christians, Mandaeans, and Yezidis) as well as secular-leaning families and professionals fled to escape being targeted amidst the increasingly violent and sectarian atmosphere in Baghdad and the country's south. Beginning with the bombing of the Shi'a shrine in Samarra in February 2006, Syria witnessed a massive influx of Shi'a and Sunni refugees who sought to escape the spiraling violence throughout the country. As the number of Iraqi refugees in Syria reached crisis levels in 2007, the government came under considerable pressure to introduce a visa requirement. Additionally, many officials expressed frustration at the world's perceived indifference to their country's efforts. After the Iraqi Prime Minister Nouri al-Maliki welcomed the idea of introducing the visa, the government implemented a new policy in October 2007 which sealed the border to many Iraqis.

Though there is no consensus on the community's size, most estimates indicate that the number of displaced Iraqis in Syria remains well over 1,000,000 in 2010. The refugee population who was registered with the UNHCR was 90,000 in 2012, 127,859 in 2011, and 151,000 in 2010.

The vast majority of refugees have left due to the immediate threats posed by Iraq's sectarian-related violence, while others have left due to a variety of related factors, which include reduced religious and social freedoms for minorities in homogenized neighborhoods, threats posed by MNF operations, reduced business and economic opportunities, and the collapse of Iraq's health care system. While many Iraqis, particularly the wealthy, have also fled to Jordan, Syria has been a popular destination.

== Profiles, origins, and locations ==
UNHCR estimates that 63% of Iraqis in Syria are Sunni, 19% Shi'a, and lists an additional 3% as Islam unspecified. Iraq's vulnerable minority groups are represented in disproportionately high numbers in Syria, with Christians at 11%, Mandaeans between 1 and 4%, and Yezidis at just under 1%. The majority of refugees are from Iraq's urban areas, with up to 80% hailing from Baghdad alone. Large portions of Iraq's Christians and Mandaeans, in particular, have fled to Syria due to the targeting and dissolution of their urban communities in Iraq. The number of Palestinians in Iraq, which was around 30,000 prior to 2003, has also shriveled as well, with most settling in the Yarmouk neighborhood of Damascus until 2006, when the Syrian government chose to restrict their entry.

In 2007, Syrian officials estimated that 80% of Iraqi refugees in Syria were living in greater Damascus. The largest Iraqi communities are found in the southern suburbs of Jaramanah, which is largely Christian, and Sayyidah Zaynab, a predominantly Shi'a neighborhood. Damascene Iraqis also maintain a visible presence in Yarmouk and Qudsiyya. Many Sunnis, in particular, have been drawn to the northern municipalities of Aleppo, Homs, and Hama, while other Iraqis have settled in Tartus, Lattakia, Hasaka, Qamishli as well as the tribal areas of Deir ez-Zor and Abu Kemal. A camp at Al-Tanf, located at the border with Iraq, at times hosted over 1,000 Palestinian refugees who fled Iraq until its closure in February 2010. UNHCR ran the refugee camp for four years before relocating the majority of its inhabitants to Europe, while the remainder have been moved to al-Hol camp in northeast Syria.

== Living conditions in Syria ==
=== Livelihoods ===
Iraqis in Syria do not live in tented refugee camps or collective centers, but many are forced to stay in dirty and overcrowded apartments. Most lease agreements are made without a written contract, leaving tenants vulnerable to exploitation by Iraqi and Syrian landlords as rental prices spiral increasingly upwards. Due to their status as "guests," Iraqi refugees are not permitted to work legally in Syria. Consequently, Iraqi unemployment rates are high: 80% for women, and 53% for men. Most Iraqis initially live off limited savings; when these run out, some improvise ways to find employment in Syria's informal economy, where they work in a variety of positions. However, Iraqis are often forced to work for meager wages and can be subject to exploitation at the hands of their employers. A number of the refugees also subsist on rental income from their properties in Iraq, remittances, or live off government pensions or salaries. While the Syrian government occasionally offers work permits to well-established Iraqi professionals and entrepreneurs, Syrian partners are usually necessary to register businesses. Nevertheless, Iraqi businesses flourish in neighborhoods with a prominent Iraqi presence. Furthermore, overcrowding and declining living standards in areas with high concentrations of Iraqi refugees coincided with a crime rate increase exceeding 20%. During this period, local authorities noted an emergence of non-traditional crimes, including kidnapping for ransom, blackmail, organized prostitution, and targeted intimidation, leading Syrian law enforcement to allocate an estimated additional $15 million toward maintaining public order in 2006.

=== Education ===
Iraqi children have access to Syrian elementary and secondary schools, where attendance is free for Syrians and Iraqis alike, though refugee families usually incur the cost of supplies, uniforms, and occasionally textbooks. Unfortunately, many Syrian schools were already crowded prior to 2003; since then, the education system has strained to accommodate the massive influx of refugee children, particularly in the Damascus area. In 2007, the Syrian Ministry of Education indicated that only 30,000 Iraqi children—only 10% of the estimated number of school-age refugees—were enrolled in public schools. Analysts attribute the low enrollment numbers to the difficulty of enrolling after the beginning of the school year or without the requisite documentation, overcrowding, curriculum and proficiency gaps between Syrians and Iraqis of the same age, long commutes between home and school, financial conditions which force some families to have their children work, and social fears due to high levels of psychological trauma among children. Though enrollment rose to nearly 50,000 in the 2007–8 school year, the number fell back down to 32,000 in 2008–09. Sadly, nearly half of the small fraction of children who manage to enroll ultimately drop out. As a consequence, illiteracy is rapidly on the rise among Iraqi children in Syria, prompting a number of aid organizations and concerned teachers in Syria to offer remedial lessons and summer classes to help Iraqis catch up to their Syrian classmates. In 2007, it was estimated that only 770 Iraqis were attending university in Syria, with a large number at the private Syrian International University outside Damascus.

=== Health care ===
All Iraqi citizens in Syria received free public health care until 2006, at which time prohibitive costs forced Syrian authorities to introduce restrictions. Though government hospitals sometimes treat Iraqis nationals for free, especially in emergency cases, refugees usually rely on clinics managed by charities, churches, or humanitarian organizations such as the Syrian Arab Red Crescent. At SARC clinics, UNHCR-registered patients were only responsible for 20% of the costs until 2009, at which time the UNHCR replaced the percentage system with a flat rate. Today, the Syrian government and various NGOs are still working the standardize the healthcare system for Iraqi refugees. In addition, the UNHCR has found that there is a serious need for psychological support to the refugees, nearly all of whom have been traumatized to varying degrees over recent years, with many still under overwhelming psychological stress today.

=== Families, women and children ===
Some Iraqi families, particularly wealthier ones, have managed to flee together to Syria. However, a large number of refugees have either experienced the death of an immediate family member, belong to families which have been split up, or have left Iraq on their own. Occasionally male family heads send their children, spouses, or entire families to Syria for security reasons, while they continue to work in Iraq or commute back and forth as drivers or traders. As such, SARC has estimated that 13% of Iraqi households in Syria are managed by women, roughly half of whom have no source of income and struggle to scrape by. Children from poor families are increasingly forced to work as shophands, street vendors, errand-runners, maids, or engage in menial labor to contribute to the family income, making on average under $2 income per day's work. A number of children are separated from their immediate families and live with relatives, while estimates suggest 1% of all Iraqi nationals in Syria are children who are fully unaccompanied.

One result of these conditions is that prostitution in Syria, though already on the rise prior to 2003, has rapidly expanded and systematized due to the Iraqi refugee crisis. A number of Iraqi women and girls have been tricked, sold, or forced to engage in prostitution. Some Iraqis have been trafficked into Syria, while others are kidnapped after they arrive. Young girls may be pressured or forced into the sex trade by their own parents or new husbands, while older girls and women may work at nightclubs or brothels for lack of better options. As the situation has developed, networks of Iraqi men and sometimes women have organized to profit from the trade. Additionally, in 2009, UNHCR identified 900 victims of sexual and gender-based violence, indicating that a number of Iraqi refugees face the threat of sexual and economic exploitation in domestic and public contexts.

== Impact on Syrian economy and society ==
In some ways, the Syrian economy has benefited from the arrival of the Iraqis, causing the International Monetary Fund (IMF) to go as far as crediting the refugees for propelling the recovery of the Syrian economy beginning in 2004. According to one of the government's chief economists, Syria's GDP doubled between 2004 and 2010 to $60 billion. The Iraqis have raised national consumption, invested in Syrian businesses, and stimulated the housing market, while cross border trade has opened up new markets for Syrian industries in Iraq. After the boon to Syrian manufacturing and commercial activity, the Syrian Ministry of Finance reported that unemployment among Syrian citizens had fallen substantially. Yet while the economic indicators suggest Syria has benefited from the arrival of the Iraqis, the rewards have only been enjoyed by a small percentage of the population. The costs induced by rising inflation, real estate prices, and demand for subsidized goods has been shouldered by Syrian consumers and the state budget. Prices for groceries and transportation have spiraled upward, while demand has also spiked for electricity, gas, and water. Nevertheless, it is difficult to tell how much Syria's changing economic conditions are directly related to the refugees rather than the state's undergoing structural adjustment programs, market reforms, and decreasing oil revenues. Regardless, Syrian officials still complained in 2007 that the Iraqi refugees had cost the state over $1 billion.

=== Public perceptions ===
Most residents of Damascus believe Iraqis have pushed the capacity of their city and country far past its limits: one taxi driver imagined there were eight million refugees in Syria, while other Damascenes routinely quote numbers ranging between three and six. Many Syrians blame Iraqis for overcrowding Damascus, stealing jobs and housing from Syrian citizens, and raising costs of all kinds. Iraqis are also often blamed for any number of domestic problems, including perceived increases in crime and prostitution. Consequently, tensions between refugees and Syrians have increased in some urban areas, though security services have prevented any open violence. Some Sunni Syrians are anxious about the influx of Shi'a refugees, though instances of open sectarian violence seem rare. In fact, it seems that living under trying conditions in a foreign country, along with escaping the divisive discourses and politics of post-2003 Iraq, has engendered tolerance and noticeable cross-socialization among Iraqis of different sects. While some Syrians view Iraqis as arrogant thugs, Iraqis sometimes view Syrians as "greedy and corrupt," particularly blaming local landlords for charging exorbitant rent costs. At the same time, many Syrians appear proud of their government's efforts to live up to its ideals of pan-Arab solidarity, while many refugees admit that they could not expect better treatment elsewhere.

== Official responses ==
=== Syria ===
Syria didn't sign the 1951 Refugee Convention and therefore considers refugees as ‘guests’ and does not give them the opportunity to apply for asylum or get refugee status. The government has been forced to balance the needs of the displaced Iraqs with its commitment to the Syrian people. The Syrian government feels that it has undergone considerable stress to deal with the effects of the American invasion of Iraq, and shows some concern that Iraqi refugees could undermine the country's stability. By assisting the Iraqi refugees, the government does attract some international funds and gains a measure of moral and pan-Arab legitimacy. It also deters the United States from hostile posturing while compelling diplomatic engagement, though the US has resisted incorporating the issue into a broader dialogue. Some observers, though, have expressed surprise that Syria has not done more to strategically advertise its efforts on the international stage to attract more funds or gain political leverage.

The government has partnered closely with the Syrian Arab Red Crescent Society and has, after initial reluctance, increasingly coordinated with the UNHCR and other international agencies, including those with close links to the United States. It appears Syrian officials did not foresee the refugee presence as a long-term problem, but imagined Iraqis would return home once their nation stabilized, resulting in their hesitance to accept outside help and relatively passive stance toward the inflow of Iraqis until it reached crisis levels in 2007. Since then, the government's initial satisfaction with the beleaguered American occupation of Iraq has evolved into concern for Iraq's stability and the potential for spillover violence. In 2007, Syrian authorities asserted that the aggregate cost of hosting the Iraqi refugees amounted to a billion dollars per year, and asked the international community to provide $257 million to help expand its health, education, and security structures to better manage the crisis. While the Syrian government has expressed disappointment with the response from foreign governments, the state donors have noted that their assistance is obstructed by long approval processes and the government's inhibitory requirements for oversight and control. As of 2010, no plans have been made to facilitate permanent or prolonged Iraqi settlement in Syria.

Syria permitted Iraqi nationals unhindered entry at the border through 2006, granting three-month visas which were renewable at immigration centers throughout the country. By 2007 the influx of refugees had risen to over 2,000 refugees per day, causing Syria to implement a requirement that temporary residents return to the border every three months for a new visa. As refugee numbers continued to spiral upward, the government finally implemented a restricted visa policy in after Iraqi Prime Minister Nouri al-Maliki gave the idea his blessing in October 2007, catching Syrian officials by surprise. Though the new policy stemmed the tide of Iraqi refugees considerably, visa regulations permit 14 categories of Iraqis to enter the country, including anyone who shows documentation proving they need medical assistance in Syria. By 2010, the number of Iraqi residents in Syria had stabilized, with about 500 entering and exiting per day. Nevertheless, many Syrian officials remain ambivalent about abrogating from the tradition of a pan-Arab borders policy, and the issue is still debated within the government today.

=== Iraq ===
In 2007, the UN High Commissioner for Refugees, António Guterres, called upon Iraq to engage more closely with its refugee populations in Syria and Jordan. That December, the Government of Iraq delivered $15 million in bilateral assistance for education and health services, which was regarded as a token gesture by some Syrian officials. Iraq's Ministry of Migration and Displacement remains under-resourced, and its efforts to recruit displaced nationals back to Iraq have been largely unsuccessful. While Iraq's government desires to retain its population, Syrian officials have expressed disappointment in Iraq's weak enthusiasm to lend assistance.

=== United States ===
In 2007, the U.S. State Department created the Iraq Refugee and Internally Displaced Persons Task Force, signaling an acceleration of humanitarian assistance and resettlement efforts. In 2008 the Bush administration doubled its funding for Iraqi refugee aid programs to $318 million. Later that year, the Obama administration announced that "America has moral obligation and a responsibility" to assist the Iraqi refugees and pledged to provide $2 billion to aid programs. In 2009, the Department of State spent $1.58 billion in Migration and Refugee Assistance, while it plans to spend another $2 billion in 2010 with $50 million earmarked for Iraqi refugees. In contrast to Jordan, which has reportedly received over $700 million in refugee-related economic aid since 2003, Syria has not received direct aid from the United States, prompting frustration among Syrian officials. While the US increased its support to UNHCR's Iraq budget to over 50% of the costs, humanitarian organizations have called upon the US to do more. The US had only taken in a total of 466 Iraqis by the end of 2007, but UNHCR records show that over the next two years it accepted over 11,000 Iraqi refugees from Syria alone. Other countries which have resettled a noteworthy, but still limited, number of Iraqi refugees from Syria include Germany, Canada, Finland, and Sweden.

=== Obligations under international law ===
Syria, like Jordan, is not a party to the 1951 UNHCR Convention and 1967 Protocol Relating to the Status of Refugees, which explicitly prohibit refoulement. However, the principle of non-refoulement is recognized as customary international law, and therefore binding on the entire international community. It is nevertheless evident that Syria has worked hard, through 2007, to take on as many refugees as possible in absence of substantial international funding. Up to this point, Syrian officials have not made any wide-scale effort to deport illegal refugees from the country. While the US may have a "moral responsibility" to the Iraqi refugees, under existing international law it has been difficult to establish a case that the United States bears primary legal responsibility.

== NGO responses and organized aid ==
Through 2008, the majority of international assistance funding was channeled through the Syrian Red Crescent, which has struggled to expand its infrastructure rapidly enough to effectively manage the funds. The 14 foreign NGOs which are active in the country have also been required to partner with the SRC to permit government oversight of their activities. International religious charities, including Caritas and the Greek Orthodox Patriarchate, have also played a substantial role, in addition to domestic aid organizations and a number of refugee self-help groups.

Since 2003, UNHCR has registered over 260,000 refugees in Syria and currently maintains around 165,000 active files. By registering with the UNHCR, Iraqis receive a letter intended to protect them from deportation, subsidized health-care, and the opportunity to apply for resettlement to third countries. The UNHCR, which mainly partners with the Syrian Red Crescent, also runs a number of educational, professional development, and psychosocial support programs; it additionally offers food, critical household goods, and direct cash assistance to some refugees.

== Voluntary return and resettlement ==
Most permanent voluntary returns to Iraq occur out of financial necessity. While several hundred thousand Iraqis have reportedly left Syria since 2007, the population of Iraqis in Syria has remained mainly stable, suggesting the rate of arrivals matches that of departures. Generally, Iraqis are not deported from Syria unless they have been charged with a crime, which includes prostitution. While Iraqis who lack documentation, entered illegally, or have overstayed their residence permit are rarely forced to leave, many non-legal residents harbor anxieties of this prospect. The number of refugees who voluntarily return to Iraq remains low. In 2009, Syria's UNHCR office, which does not actively promote repatriation due to security and political concerns, only assisted the return of 646 individuals to Iraq. In the first six months of 2010, only 109 individuals repatriated, of whom 65 received assistance from UNHCR. Assistance is $100 per adult and $50 per child. The refugees, by and large, are reluctant to return to Iraq, and generally do so only to make short trips on personal or business errands. Increasing violence during the Syrian Civil War led to an increasing number of Iraqis returning to their native country. UNCHR reported that more than 13,000 Iraqis left Syria in the first half of 2012 with the majority of them returning to Iraq. Figures continued to increase after the Battle of Damascus, by early August, more than 23,000 Iraqis had returned since mid July. As of August 17, the number of returnees had reached 26,000, by August 31 more than 31,000 had returned. By March 2013, more than 76,000 had returned since the beginning of the conflict.

Since February 2007 the UNHCR has referred a total of 34,015 resettlement cases. Around 17% of Iraqis that registered with UNHCR have been considered and submitted for resettlement. Between January 2007 and September 2008 an average of 1,000 Iraqi refugees per month were resettled to third countries. 30,000 Iraqis were resettled to USA. Canada has taken in 1,890 Iraqi refugees, Australia 1,757, Sweden, 1,180, and Germany 2,000.

== Notable people ==
- Amal Al Khedairy, academic, lecturer and founder and director of the cultural centre "Al Beit Al Iraqi" ("The Iraqi House")
- Solhi Al-Wadi, musician
- Alia Mamdouh, novelist and journalist
- Jack Marshall (author), author and poet
- Sharif Hikmat Nashashibi co-founder and chairman of Arab Media Watch
- Ibn Rajab, scholar
- Ahmed ibn Yusuf, mathematician

== See also ==
- Iraq-Syria relations
- Iraqi refugees
- Iraqis in Jordan
- Iraqis in Lebanon
- Iraqis in Turkey
- United Nations High Commissioner for Refugees
- Syrian-Assyrians
- Syrian Kurds
- Syrian Turkmen
- Syrians in Iraq
