= Iraqis in Turkey =

Ethnic group in the Republic of Turkey

Total population
- 125,000

Regions with significant populations
- Istanbul, Konya, Trabzon, Ankara and Bodrum.

Languages
- Mesopotamian Arabic, Turkish (Iraqi Turkmen/Turkoman dialects), Kurdish (Sorani and Kurmanji dialects), and Neo-Aramaic (Assyrian and Mandaic)

Religion
- Predominantly Islam with a significant Christianity minority (Syriac Christianity and Eastern Catholic) and a small number of Mandaeans.

Related ethnic groups
- Arabs, Armenians, Assyrians, Azeris, Iranians, Kurds, Mizrahim, Iraqi Turkmen

Iraqis in Turkey includes Turkish citizens of Iraqi origin, Iraqi-born citizens and Iraqi expat workers.

== History ==
Turkey experienced a large influx of Iraqis between the years of 1988 and 1991 due to both the Iran–Iraq War and the first Gulf War, with around 50,000 to 460,000 Iraqis entering the country. However, Turkey took a different approach following the 2003 invasion of Iraq in 2003, when the government took strong measures in ensuring there be no mass influx of Iraqis for the third time. Thus, despite an approximate of two million Iraqis fleeing to neighbouring Syria and Jordan, only 10,000 had arrived in Turkey. Despite Turkey being Iraq's only neighbour to be a party to the Convention Relating to the Status of Refugees, Turkey has restricted the possibility for Iraqi refugees who escaped armed conflict, like all non-Europeans, to be issued refugee status.

Nowadays, ever since the end of Iraq’s war with ISIS and the return of stability to the country, most refugees returned to Iraq. Iraqis living in Turkey number about 125,000, and most of them are expats who come to the country for work or are foreign students that settle in the country for education. Iraqi people are among the nationalities that purchase the most properties in the country, alongside Iranians, Russians, Germans, and Brits.

== Refugees during the Gulf War ==
Large movements of Kurdish refugees took place after revolts that broke out in Kurdish areas in northern Iraq during the Gulf War (August 2, 1990 – February 28, 1991) were curtailed by raids of the Iraqi military. While Iran allowed 1.3 million Kurds into its borders, Turkey attempted to block the entry of more than 450,000 Kurds who were headed its way in an attempt to flee violence, leaving them trapped in the Iraqi-Turkish mountain range. In an attempt to avoid a humanitarian crisis, a US-led force intervened in northern Iraq, establishing a security zone and a no-fly zone to protect the Kurds. Backed by UN Security Council resolution 688, operation Provide Comfort represented the first time the military was involved in humanitarian emergencies. The 450,000 Kurds were brought down from the Iraqi-Turkish mountain range into flat areas on the Iraqi side of the border near Zakho and Donuk, where the US Army set up refugee camps, handing them to be managed by UN High Commissioner for Refugees (UNHCR). The Kurdish refugees were first protected by coalition military, and once they left, by UN guards. Historically, this was the only time that Iraqi refugees were in camps.

The Kurdish issue seriously tested UNHCR's protection mandate, as while it is obliged to protect and assist people who are outside of their own countries, the refugees camps were located inside Iraq. At the same time, UNHCR could not persuade Turkey to accept the Kurds into its area as states are obligated not to return people to situations where they might be persecuted, but they could not be forced to provide them asylum. UNHCR promoted voluntary repatriation, and by June 1991 all Kurds who stayed at the camps near Iraqi-Turkish border had returned to their towns in northern Iraq.

== Refugees during the Iraq War ==
In an attempt to prevent large movements of Iraqi refugees into its country resulting from the 2003 invasion of Iraq, the Turkish government tightened its security at its border with Iraq during the Iraq War. As a result of Turkey's efforts, only 6,000-10,000 Iraqi refugees made it to Turkey, of whom 5,400 were registered in 2008. By 2007, UNHCR had 8 national staff in Turkey.

By November 2010, there were 5,235 Iraqis in Turkey registered by UNHCR. Of those, 59.7% were male, and 63.9% were between the ages of 18–59. Additionally, 49.3% originated in Baghdad, and while 47.3% arrived to Turkey in 2010, 7.8% arrived prior to 2006. While 36.4% are Arab, 28.5% are Assyrian, and 6.2% are Kurd. Finally, 10.5% of registered Iraqis in Turkey are Christian, 78.6% are Sunni, and 10.9% are Shia.

By January 2011, there were 6,600 registered Iraqi refugees and 1,700 registered Iraqi asylum seekers in Turkey.

== Profiles and locations ==
Iraqis are predominantly situated in Istanbul The Iraqi Assyrian community in Turkey constitute one of the largest Catholic communities in Istanbul, most of whom are women.

== See also ==
- Iraq–Turkey relations
- Iraqi Turkmen
- Iraqi refugees
- Iraqis in Iran
- Iraqis in Syria
- Iraqis in Jordan
- Iraqis in Lebanon
- United Nations High Commissioner for Refugees
