= Jordan–Kurdistan Region relations =

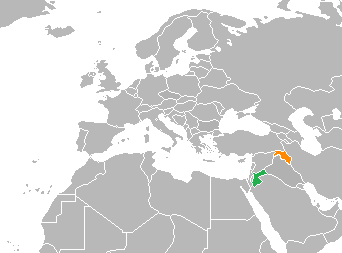

- Jordan: Kurdistan Region

Jordan–Kurdistan Region relations are bilateral relations between Jordan and the Kurdistan Region (Note: While Kurdistan Region refers to the autonomous Kurdish region in Northern Iraq, Iraqi Kurdistan is a geographical term referring to the Kurdish area of Iraq). Jordan is represented in Kurdistan Region through a consulate general in Erbil since 2011, while Kurdistan Region has no representation in Jordan. Relations are described as historical, dating back to the times of Mullah Mustafa Barzani and King Hussein bin Talal. As a response to the unilateral Kurdish independence referendum in September 2017, Jordanian foreign minister Ayman Safadi stated that the issue was an internal Iraqi affair and that Jordan did not interfere in other countries' domestic affairs. The Jordanian Consul General in Erbil described ties as "strong and solid" in August 2018.

== High-ranking meetings ==
In 1996, Iraqi Kurdish rebel leader Jalal Talabani and King Hussein of Jordan met to press for the Iraqi opposition to unite. At the inauguration of the Jordanian consulate general, Jordanian prime minister Marouf Bakhit visited Kurdistan Region with a delegation including Minister of Agriculture Samir Habashneh, Minister of Trade and Industry Hani Mulki and Minister of Energy and Natural Resources Khaled Toukan and four other ministers. During the visit, seven Memoranda of Understandings were signed between the two parties. Jordanian King Abdullah II of Jordan and Kurdish president Masoud Barzani has met on five occasions; March 2007, in May 2014, in May 2015, in February 2016 and in May 2017. Kurdish prime minister Nechirvan Barzani also met with the King in January 2018 during the World Economic Forum in Davos and relations were described as 'excellent'. In January 2019, Masoud Barzani visited Jordan and met with King Abdullah for regional talks.

== See also ==
- Iraq–Jordan relations
