= 2005 Al Hillah bombing =

Suicide bombing at a police recruiting center in Al Hillah, Iraq

- Part of Iraqi insurgency (2003–2006) in Iraqi insurgency (2003–2011)
- Location: Al Hillah, Iraq
- Date: February 28, 2005
- Target: Iraqi police recruiting center
- Attack type: Suicide car bomb
- Deaths: 127
- Injuries: Hundreds
- Perpetrators: Al-Qaeda in Iraq; Raed Mansour al-Banna (suicide bomber)

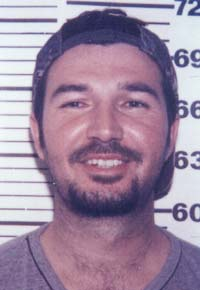
Raed al-Banna (1973–2005), the AQI Jordanian suicide bomber who detonated his truck in the Al-Hillah attack

The Al Hillah bombing killed 127 people, chiefly men lining up to join the Iraqi police forces, at the recruiting centre on February 28, 2005 in Al Hillah, Iraq.

The bombing caused a worsening of Iraqi-Jordanian diplomatic relations after it was learned that suicide bomber, Raed Mansour al-Banna, had come from Jordan. Banna's family in Jordan gave him a heroic funeral, angering many Iraqi Shia. Thousands protested outside the Jordanian embassy in Baghdad and demanded it close, and the dispute led to both countries recalling their respective ambassadors.

Al-Banna had earlier tried to enter the United States in July 2003, although he was turned away at O'Hare Airport as he possessed "multiple terrorist risk factors".
