= Iraqis in Jordan =

Ethnic group

Total population
- 131,000

Regions with significant populations
- Amman, Madaba

Languages
- Mesopotamian Arabic, Kurdish (Feyli and Kurmanji dialects), Turkish (Iraqi Turkmen/Turkoman dialects), and Neo-Aramaic (Assyrian and Mandaic)

Religion
- Predominantly: Islam (Shia and Sunni); Christianity (Syriac Christianity, Catholicism).

Related ethnic groups
- Arabs, Armenians, Assyrians, Azerbaijanis, Iranians, Jordanians, Kurds, Mizrahim, Turks

Iraqis in Jordan are estimated to number approximately 131,000.

== Immigration history ==
There have been two primary waves of Iraqi refugees coming into Jordan. The first wave arrived in the 1990s in the aftermath of the 1991 Gulf War, following Saddam's brutal repression of Iraqi Shi'a and Kurds and the imposition of economic sanctions on Iraq. At first, Iran was the destination of choice for the hundreds of thousands fleeing Iraq, but after 1995 Iraqis increasingly turned to Jordan to either settle there or use it as a transit base to other countries. Many of these refugees were upper-middle class, including doctors, intellectuals and teachers. Fewer lower class Iraqis settled in Jordan, as their poverty meant that they did not have the financial means to emigrate. The fact that many of these pre-2003 migrants had sold their properties in Iraq and brought large amounts of cash with them indicated that they did not plan to return to Iraq. The Jordanian immigration authority has provided the numbers of Iraqi nationals entering and leaving Jordan since 1990 up to March 2007, estimating them at 547,000.

Before the start of the 2003 US-led invasion of Iraq, between 250,000 and 350,000 Iraqis were thought to have been already living in Jordan. This figure has included not only Iraqi refugees, but also long-term residents who had remained in Jordan to work.

After the 2003 invasion, the demographics of those fleeing from Iraq to Jordan were similar to those of the first wave. They were businessmen and former government officials who brought with them great potential for investments. This influx of cash helped boost the Jordanian economy, but also fueled inflation and wage shortages, which aggravated existing inequalities.

Several factors influence Iraqis' decision to settle in Jordan. Jordan, unlike other neighboring countries, did not impose severe restrictions on Iraqis entering its territory. Iraqis both believed that Jordan would be willing to take them and that they would have a good chance of entering the country. Moreover, Jordan offered peace and stability and had a history of treating refugees, especially Iraqi refugees. When Iraqis began fleeing in large numbers in 2004, Jordan did not require prior entry visas from Iraqis, treating them as it treated nationals of other friendly Arab states.

Although exact numbers of Iraqi refugees are not easy to come by since the Jordanian government has not carried out any solid statistical studies, the United Nations High Commissioner for Refugees estimates that 750,000 to 1 million of whom have fled to Jordan. Iraqi refugees' settlement patterns, coupled with the Jordanian government's insistence that Iraqis are "guests" and not "refugees" have made it difficult to reach an accurate estimate of the numbers of Iraqi refugees in Jordan. What distinguishes the Iraqi refugee crisis is the fact that many of the refugees were middle class urbanites who fled to large urban areas in Jordan. This makes it extremely difficult for humanitarian agencies to provide services and collect accurate information from an 'invisible' refugee population. Moreover, the memory of Palestinian refugee camps in the collective Arab consciousness has undoubtedly been a factor in the urban settlement pattern of Iraqi refugees in Jordan and Syria.

== Living conditions in Jordan ==
=== Livelihoods ===
The Norwegian NGO Fafo produced a survey of Iraqis in Jordan and found that more than 70 per cent of Iraqis in Jordan are of working age and that of these about 30 per cent are participating in the work force. The numbers for women are even lower, with about 14 per cent being active in the labor market. Of those currently employed, 10 per cent wish to change their jobs given that they feel their jobs do not match their qualifications, probably reflecting middle class frustration at having to live on the margins of society in Jordan.

Many of the Iraqis who left Iraq were doctors. In Jordan, senior Iraqi doctors find themselves working as junior doctors. Hospitals take advantage of the fact that most of these doctors do not have legal residency permits and therefore are not eligible to work, forcing them to work without pay and for longer hours.

Given the high unemployment rate for Iraqi refugees, about 64 per cent are forced to rely on transfers of income from Iraq or a third country. These remittances from Iraq expose Iraqis in Jordan to a host of vulnerabilities, including the depletion of savings and destitution resulting from the cessation of transfers. The difficult living conditions have encouraged some Iraqi refugees to migrate further from Jordan to Turkey and on to Europe

=== Education ===
From the time of the Iraq invasion until September 2007 Jordan's policy towards Iraqi children enrolling in Jordanian schools was ambiguous. The policy barred Iraqi children from enrolling in public schools if their families were not registered; they were allowed to attend private schools, however.

The Government of Jordan clarified its policy in August 2007 when Iraqis were allowed to access all types and levels of public education regardless of their parents' residential status. Yet, this change in rules did not result in a huge increase in Iraqis' enrollment in public schools. Personal details and addresses are requirements for registration, and as such parents are reluctant to allow their children to go to school, fearing deportation. Additionally, many Iraqi children have been outside of the school system for one to three years, presenting an obstacle to their return to formal education. Families are also unable to afford the registration expenses, may lack appropriate documentation, or may not want to enroll their children due to religious concerns.

=== Women ===
According to a study by Fafo, 20 per cent of Iraqi households in Jordan are female-headed, and these are amongst the poorest households. In a report by the Women's Commission for Refugee Women and Children, most female Iraqi refugees 'raised concerns about domestic violence, including marital rape, which is not illegal in Jordan.' Destitute families force women and girls into prostitution in order to survive. According to the Women's Commission, sex work among Iraqi refugees is a growing problem, with customers coming directly to women's homes or to other private locations.

== Religion ==
In 2008, the majority of refugees are Sunni Muslims accounting for 60 percent of the Iraqi community in Jordan while, 18 percent are Shia Muslims, and 15 percent are Christian. As of 2008, most Iraqis residing in Amman, originally come from war torn Baghdad. 22 per cent of Iraqi adults work legally.

== Jordanian government policy toward Iraqi refugees ==
As the anthropologist Geraldine Chatelard has written, Jordanian officials initially viewed the Iraqis as a security and economic issue and not a humanitarian concern. The officials feared that an emphasis on the crisis narrative would lead to Iraqis becoming like the millions of Palestinian refugees already in Jordan. For this reason, the Government of Jordan argued that the displaced Iraqis were not refugees, but "guests" who would return to Iraq.

Jordan is not a signatory to the Convention Relating to the Status of Refugees, and its treatment of Iraqis as "guests" ensures that Iraqis are secured and respected but fails to provide them with clear legal status. Jordanian officials have consistently argued that the only solutions for displaced Iraqis were resettlement or repatriation, and the United Nations and donor countries have also adopted this idea.

Jordanian policies came under fire in 2006, when a report by Human Rights Watch charged officials with trying to keep a large number of Iraqi refugees practically invisible. The report stated that wealthy Iraqis were able to buy residency permits, opening the way to better lives, work, and access to Jordanian public services. Poorer Iraqis were unable to afford residency permits, and without legal status have no guarantee of jobs, health care, or education for their children. This sector is especially vulnerable to harassment and deportation.

== Notable people ==
- Abdul Rahman Munif, novelist, born in Amman
- Sharif Hikmat Nashashibi co-founder and chairman of Arab Media Watch

== See also ==
- Arab Federation of Iraq and Jordan
- Assyrians in Jordan
- House of Hashim
- Iraq–Jordan relations
- Kurds in Jordan
- Turks in Jordan
