= Iraqis in Lebanon =

Total population
- 50,000; 1.25 — 2.5% of the total population

Regions with significant populations
- Beirut, Roumieh, Baalbeck, Beqaa, Nabatiyeh, Baabda, Aley, Matn, Tyre, Sidon, Hermel, Zahlé, Bint Jbeil, Chouf, Byblos, Tripoli, Koura

Languages
- Mesopotamian, Kurdish, Neo-Aramaic (incl. Mandaic), Turkmen

Religion
- Predominantly Islam; Christianity (Syriac Christianity, Catholicism).

Related ethnic groups
- Arabs, Armenians, Assyrians, Azeris, Iranians, Lebanese, Mizrahim, Turks

Iraqis in Lebanon are people of Iraqi origin residing in Lebanon and Lebanese citizens of Iraqi ancestry. Statistics for Iraqi refugees in Lebanon vary, but typically put the number at around 50,000.

== History ==
Iraqis have been present in Lebanon for decades. However, the first real influx of a large number of Iraqis to Lebanon started in earnest in the 1990s, with Iraqis fleeing Saddam Hussein's regime as well as the hardships of international sanctions. Most of the Iraqis during this period were Shia, fleeing Saddam's regime, or Christians, seeking exile in an Arab country with a significant local Christian population. Human Rights Watch puts the pre-2003 number of Iraqis in Lebanon at about 10,000.

=== Recent migration ===
After the 2003 invasion of Iraq, the first wave of Iraqi refugees fleeing the war began. By the middle of 2005, the number of Iraqis in Lebanon had doubled from the pre-Iraq War figure to 20,000. This number more than doubled with the second wave of Iraqi refugees fleeing the country after the February 2006 bombing of al-Askari Mosque in Samarra. By 2007 the numbers of Iraqis in Lebanon increases to between 26,000 and 100,000, but usually set at 50,000 by international agencies. Reliable and irrefutable statistics are difficult to come by with the majority of refugees in legal limbo. Variations in statistics as well as many of the issues that Iraqi refugees in Lebanon face are also linked to the 'invisible' nature of urban refugees.

Of the 8,090 Iraqi refugees actively registered with the UNHCR in Lebanon, over half have arrived since 2009. Of the same group of refugees, most are either Christians (42.0%) or Shia Muslims (39.2%) with a minority of Sunni Muslims (15.6%) and other sects or religions, including Mandeans and Yezidis (less than 1%, each). Most Iraqis in Lebanon are from Baghdad, having entered the country via Syria.

As a direct result of the instability and violence that followed the 2003 invasion of Iraq, the number of Iraqis in the country changed. Statistics for Iraqi refugees in Lebanon vary, as 2007, the number was around 50,000. As of 2007, statistics from the United Nations High Commissioner for Refugees put the current number of Iraqi refugees at just under 30,000.

=== Legal status ===
Lebanon is not a signatory of the 1951 Convention Relating to the Status of Refugees, nor the 1967 Protocol, leaving the 1962 law regarding the entry and stay of foreigners as the legal status determinant. 71 per cent of Iraqis surveyed in 2007 by the Danish Refugee Council had illegal status, and 95 per cent of respondents reached Lebanon by being smuggled across the Syrian-Lebanese border.

=== Education and health care ===
Since Iraqis rely on children as a source of income, impacting the enrollment levels for boys and girls. Other factors, including cost, lack of documentation as well as language difficulties from dialectal differences impact education for this population in general. Attendance rates in school amongst youths of the ages six to seventeen, range at around 58%, in which female enrollment is much higher at 63.7 percent, in comparison with 54.3 percent being males.

=== Repatriation and resettlement ===
Many Iraqis chose to take refuge in Lebanon because of the notion that it was easier to get registered for resettlement in a third country with the UNHCR in Beirut. While the Lebanese government has not granted legal status to most Iraqi refugees, keeping them subject to detention and incarceration, it has granted short periods of amnesty for Iraqis who have overstayed their visas in the past.

=== Palestinian Iraqis ===
Another issue facing Iraqis are those of Palestinian origin who have entered Lebanon illegally and have not registered with the PLO representative office in Lebanon, thus losing access to the UNRWA education and health services.

=== Lebanese-Iraqi relations ===
In November 2007, the Iraqi government gave Lebanon $2 million to 'soothe the burden' of Iraqi refugees for Lebanon.

== Demographics ==
Amongst the adult population, 44 percent are single while 52 percent are married, in which a higher proportion of adult women are married whereas the men are single.

=== Religious and ethnic affiliation ===
A survey recently released information that Muslim Shia are by far the majority of Iraqis in Lebanon at 51 percent, followed by Assyrian Chaldean Catholics which stand at 19 percent, while Sunni Muslims only amount to 12 percent of the population.

== Notable Iraqi-Lebanese figures ==
- Salma Samar Damluji, architect, professor and author (Born in Beirut to an Iraqi father and a Lebanese mother)
- Rola Bahnam, model and media personality (Born to an Iraqi father and a Lebanese mother)
- Ahmad al-Safi al-Najafi, poet
- Muqtada al-Sadr, Iraqi Shi'a cleric of Lebanese ancestry
- Raad Ghantous, interior designer
- Jana El Horr, activist
- Victor Nacif, Vice President of Design Business Aspects for Nissan Design America
- Sheila Savar, founder of Savar & Associates

== See also ==
- Iraq-Lebanon relations
- Iraqi refugees
- Iraqis in Syria
- Assyrians in Lebanon
- Kurds in Lebanon
- Turks in Lebanon
- Lebanon: Refugees
