= Iraq–Syria relations =

- Iraq: Syria

Iraq–Syria relations are the diplomatic relations between the sovereign states of the Republic of Iraq and the Syrian Arab Republic. Both countries are neighbours and they share the Iraq–Syria border. Bilateral relations are marked by long-shared cultural and political links, as well as former regional rivalry.

The two countries took their present form after the Sykes–Picot Agreement to dismember the Ottoman Empire into British and French spheres of influence after World War I. The two countries have been marred by traditional rivalry for pre-eminence in Arab affairs, allegations of involvement in each other's internal politics, and disputes over the waters of Euphrates River, oil transit fees, and stances toward Israel. Ba'athist Syria also joined the coalition that liberated Kuwait from Ba'athist Iraqi occupation in the 1991 Gulf War. Following a series of allegations that Syria was supporting terrorism in Iraq during the 2003–2011 Iraq War, both countries eventually normalized relations in 2006. Although Iraq, along with associated Shia militias, once provided support to the Assad regime during the Syrian civil war, the official Iraqi rhetoric towards the new administration changed after Syrian rebels successfully overthrew the Assad regime in 2024. In subsequent official Iraqi statements, the Iraqi government stressed respect for the free will of all Syrians while emphasizing the importance of Syria's security, territorial integrity and independence. However, relations remain tense due to the opposition of elites in the Iraqi government towards normalization with the new Syrian government, on grounds that it’s associated with Islamist extremist groups.

== Background ==
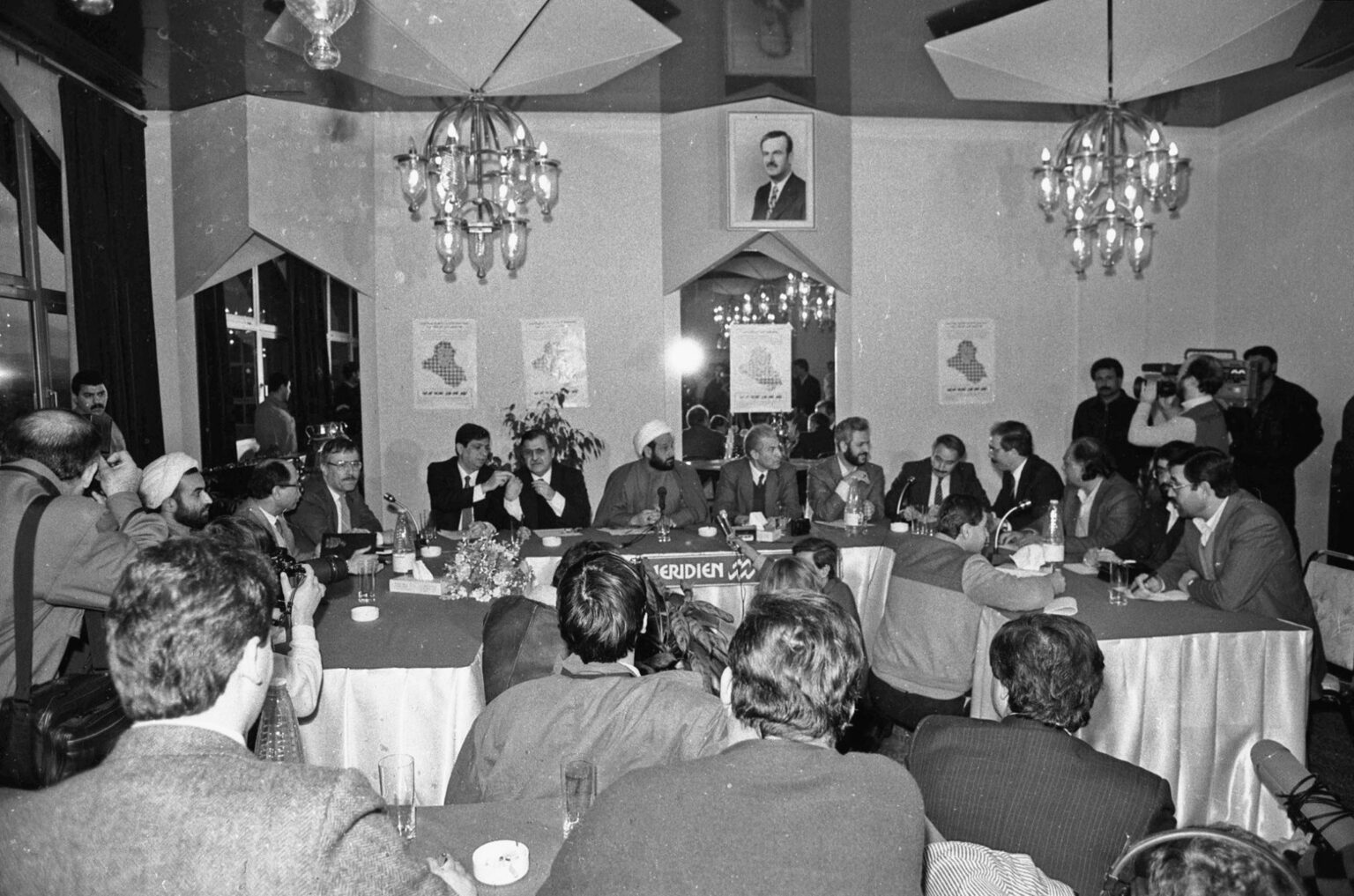
Iraqi opposition press conference in Damascus, 1991

Iraq and Syria are united by historical, social, political, cultural and economic relations. The land known as Mesopotamia is Iraq and eastern Syria and is called such by its inhabitants. Ever since Faisal I took the Iraqi throne in the early 1920s, Iraqi leaders have dreamed of unifying the two countries. The modern history of Iraq and Syria is deeply intertwined and has many troubled junctures. The Ba'ath Party started in Syria, from which the Iraqi version emerged, and both produced diverging but nonetheless disastrous authoritarian regimes and dictatorships. Relations were mostly poor during the Ba'athist regimes of Hafez al-Assad and Saddam Hussein, though Hafez's son Bashar al-Assad significantly improved relations. New diplomatic relations established in November 2006, were heralded as the beginning of an era of close cooperation between Iraq and Syria.

Both countries fought against the Islamic State (IS). In the Syrian Civil War, Iraqi volunteers have been fighting in Syria alongside the Syrian Arab Army. The two countries were part of the Russia–Syria–Iran–Iraq coalition which was formed as a consequence of an agreement reached at the end of September 2015 between Russia, Iran, Iraq and the Syrian government to "help and cooperate in collecting information about the Islamic State to combat the advances of the group, according to the statement issued by the Iraqi Joint Operations Command. From 2017 to 2019, private militias in Iraq joined the Syrian Civil War on behalf of the Assad regime and helped eliminate the Islamic State within the country. After the fall of the Assad regime in late 2024, various ethnic groups, religious minorities and civil society organizations in Iraq are paying close attention to the developments and hope that the international community will proactively help Syria achieve inclusive governance, thereby avoiding endangering the stability of Iraq.

== History ==
=== Medieval period ===
In the ninth and tenth centuries, the Hamdanid emirate of Syria and Jazira broke off with the Abbasid Caliphate based in Iraq. The Hamdanids occupied parts of Abbasid Iraq in 942, before being expelled by the Buyids of Iran.

The Seljuks moved into Iraq and Syria during the eleventh century. Abbasid Iraq regained independence and the caliph was recognized as the spiritual leader of Sunni Islam by the Seljuks, including the Seljuks of Syria. In the 12th century, the Zengids took power in Syria and intervened in the war between Abbasid Iraq and the Seljuks. Saladin of the Ayyubid dynasty was later declared the Sultan of Egypt and Sultan of Syria; he aligned Syria to the Abbasids in Iraq.

=== Mandatory Iraq and Syria ===
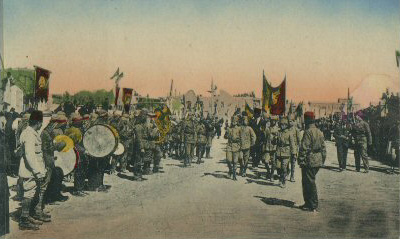
Proclamation of King Faisal I as a King of Syria (8 March 1920).

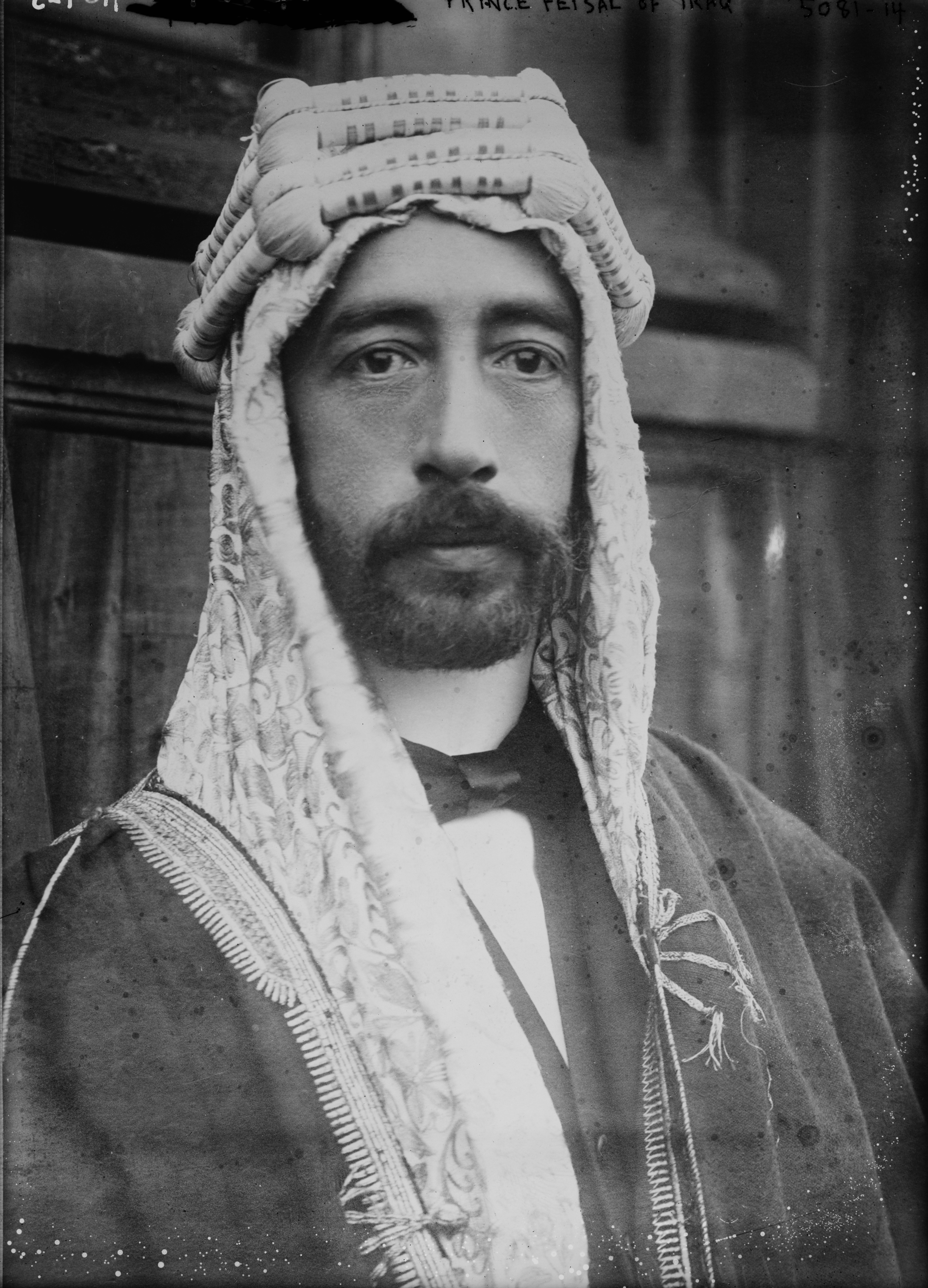
Faisal I in 1920.

In April 1920, the Allied San Remo Conference was held in Italy, which announced imposition of the British mandate over Iraq and the French over Syria. In June 1920, the Great Iraqi Revolution, known as the Twentieth Revolution, broke out in an attempt to liberate Iraq from the British occupation, and in July 1920 the famous Battle of Maysalun took place, which ended with the French occupation of Damascus and the overthrow of King Faisal's Arab Kingdom of Syria.

The borders between the two countries were not defined in this early period in the history of the two countries, but the Ottoman border line between the Iraqi and Syrian states was the Khabur River, and therefore the cities of Al-Bukamal and Al-Mayadeen and Deir ez-Zor were Iraqi cities.

According to these borders, Britain, which was exercising legal sovereignty over Iraq at that period, sent political officers to rule these cities, but in late 1919 Syrian forces and clans launched an attack on these towns and captured British officers. As a result of this work, Britain recognized the fait accompli and the borders were amended to their current status.

From then until the end of World War II, the relations between the two countries did not witness any significant developments. Both countries were subject to the mandate regime, which prevents states from establishing political or diplomatic relations without the permission of the mandatory state. Therefore, relations between Iraq and Syria were limited to business relations.

The independence of Syria and Lebanon was declared in 1943 and 1946 respectively. Syria and Iraq established diplomatic relations on 8 November 1945 when has been accredited Charge d'Affaires of Iraq to Syria Ibrahim Fadli.

Iraq as a founding state in the United Nations made tremendous efforts for international recognition of Syria and Lebanon and their inclusion in the membership of the United Nations, which necessitated the fulfillment of the thanks of the Syrian and Lebanese governments to the Iraqi government. In the late forties, a series of military coups took place in Syria, some of which were calling for the annexation of Syria to Iraq as a solution to the crisis of political instability.

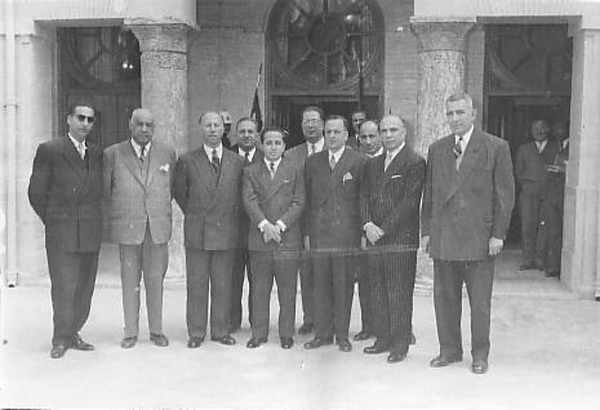
King Faisal II of Iraq with Syrian statesmen in Iraq (1957).

In 1958, unity was established between Egypt led by Gamal Abdel Nasser and Syria and the monarchy in Iraq rejected this unity, which caused a rupture between the two countries and a state of tension and conspiracies. It continued until the fall of the Kingdom of Iraq after the 14 July Revolution.

Although establishing unity between Iraq and the United Arab Republic was one of the goals of the Iraqi revolution, this did not happen, but the countries entered into a state of hostility and media attacks continued even after the separation of Syria from Egypt in 1961.

=== Ba'athist Iraq and Ba'athist Syria ===
Iraq–Syria relations
- Iraq: Syria

Iraqi flag from 1963-1991, and also the flag of Syria from 1963-1972. The three stars were said to represent Iraq, Syria and Egypt, and their desire to unify into one state.

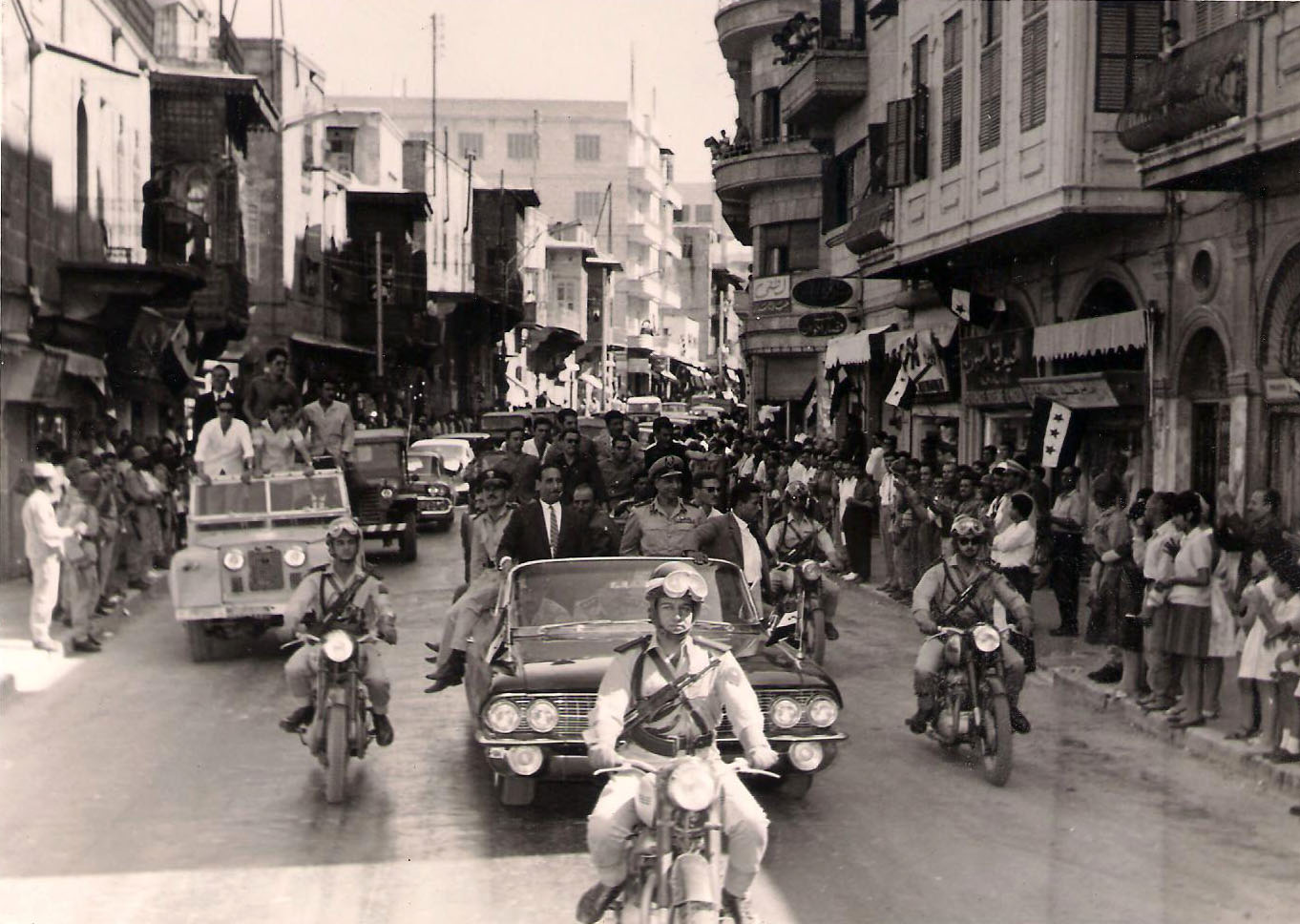
President of Iraq Abdul Salam Arif with President of Syria Amin al-Hafiz in Damascus, Syria (1963).

Efforts by Syrians and Iraqis to unite Iraq and Syria into one country have existed since the creation of the modern states. Such unification efforts were to continue under the Ba'ath Party. Hostility between Syria and Iraq started in the 1966 when both were under Ba'athist rule. Relations improved in the early 1970s during the Yom Kippur War, but deteriorated again following Syria's acceptance of the UN-sponsored ceasefire.

After the 1973 Yom Kippur War, Syrian President Hafez al-Assad made several attempts in 1974 and 1975 to settle his differences with Iraq (arising from Syria's acceptance of UN Resolution 338 which led to the ceasefire in the 1973 War; Iraq withdrew the expeditionary force it had sent to help Syria as a result of Syria's acceptance of the ceasefire) and establish a union between the two countries. They have also added a wall between the borders of Syria and Iran. Iraq however rejected Assad's offers and denounced him for his "readiness to make peace" with Israel. Strained relations between Iraq and Syria would continue up until 1978.

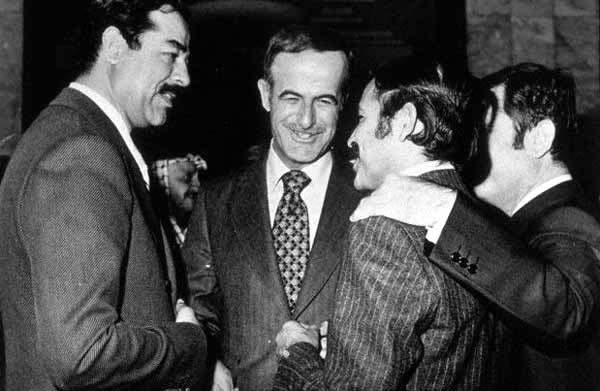
Syrian President Hafez al-Assad (centre) with Iraqi Vice President Saddam Hussein (left), Algerian Foreign Minister Abdelaziz Bouteflika (right), and Syrian Vice-President Abdul Halim Khaddam (far right, half-covered) at 1978 Arab League Summit in Baghdad.

By October 1978, Iraq President, Ahmed Hassan al-Bakr began working closely with Assad to foil the Camp David Accords; signing in Baghdad a charter for Joint National Action which provided for the "closest form of unity ties" including "complete military unity" as well as "economic, political and cultural unification".

In 1978 Iraqi President Ahmed Hassan al-Bakr and Hafez al-Assad, had agreed to a plan and started to make treaties that would lead to the unification of Iraq and Syria. This plan was to come into effect in July 1979. However, Saddam Hussein, the Deputy Secretary of the Iraqi Ba'ath Party, fearful of losing his power to Assad (who was supposed to become the deputy leader in the new union), forced al-Bakr into retirement under threat of violence.

Unity talks did continue between Assad and Saddam after July 1979, but Assad rejected Iraqi demands for a full merger between the two states and for the immediate deployment of Iraq troops into Syria. Instead Assad, perhaps fearful of Iraqi domination and a new war with Israel, advocated a step-by-step approach. The unity talks were eventually suspended indefinitely after an alleged discovery of a Syrian plot to overthrow Saddam Hussein in November 1979.

Shortly after coming to power Saddam claimed to have been informed of a plot against him, supported by the Syrians, and suspended, then later abandoned the plan for unification. In November 1979 both countries officially suspended relations with one another and withdrew their diplomatic missions. Prior to his forced retirement Bakr had expressed to Assad a desire to speed up the process of union, as he feared elements within the Iraqi Ba'ath Party were trying to kill the union plan. However the Iran–Iraq War and Assad's growing closeness with Iran effectively ended any hopes of rapprochement, and in January 1982 the borders between the two countries were closed and sealed and all trade and movement of citizens was stopped.

Later, Syria broke relations after Iraq invaded Kuwait in 1990 and joined other Arab states in sending military forces to the coalition that forced Iraq out of Kuwait. However by 1997, Syrian president Hafez al-Assad began reestablishing relations with Iraqi president Saddam Hussein. The ascendance of Bashar in 2000 boosted this process. Under Bashar, Syria ignored the sanctions against Iraq and helped Iraq to illegally import oil. Up until the renewal of diplomatic ties in 2006, Iraq's new leaders frequently accused Ba'athist Syria of trying to destabilize their country by allowing Sunni Arab foreign fighters to cross back and forth over the border between the two countries.

=== Post-Assad developments ===
On 26 December 2024, Iraqi Intelligence Chief Hamid Al-Shatri met with Ahmed al-Sharaa, leader of HTS, in Damascus, marking Iraq's first official contact with Syria's new administration post-Assad. Discussions focused on security and stability along their 600 kilometres (370 mi) border, emphasizing the need to prevent ISIS armed groups from exploiting the situation.

On 14 March 2025, Syrian Foreign Minister Asaad al-Shaibani arrived in Baghdad for an unannounced visit. The visit was initially scheduled for 22 February but was postponed without an official explanation from either side.

== Military relations ==
=== During the Iraq War ===
Although the official relations between the two countries were suspended in the past, Syrian-Iraqi relations experienced developments in recent years and the reciprocal visits between the two countries have led to a number of agreements on economic cooperation including an agreement for resuming pumping of oil through the Syrian territories which was suspended in 1982.

Bashar strongly opposed the American-led invasion of Iraq in 2003. He sheltered Iraqi Ba'athists and allowed volunteers through Syria to fight the Americans. Syrian pressure for reviewing the de-Ba'athification policy and support for insurgents was despised by the new Iraqi government. American-occupied Iraq suspended oil supplies to Syria.

In 2006, Syria recognized the post-invasion Iraqi government and resumed ties. However relations still remained poor until 2011 when American troops withdrew from Iraq and the Syrian uprising took place against al-Assad. Both countries alongside Iran formed a tripartite regional alliance as Iran and Iraq feared Saudi influence in Syria. Unlike most of the Arab League countries, Iraq rejected calls for al-Assad to step down.

Syria's foreign minister, Walid Muallem, visited Iraq in 2006, which was the first such meeting since the 2003 invasion of Iraq. Ambassadors were established later in 2006. On 23 August 2009 the Iraqi government aired a taped conversation linking two members of the Syria-based Iraqi Ba'athist movement, Sattam Farhan and Mohammed Younis al-Ahmed, with the August 2009 Baghdad bombings which claimed more than 100 lives. The Syrian foreign ministry denied Syrian involvement in the attack. On 25 August Iraq summoned its ambassador to return from Syria, the Syrian government issued a similar order to its ambassador within hours in retaliation. Responsibility for the attack was later claimed by the Islamic State of Iraq.

=== During the Syrian Civil War ===
In the Syrian Civil War, Iraq was one of the governments who have shown support for the Assad regime

Both Shia-led Iraq and Ba'athist Syria were close allies of Iran. Iraq has maintained its embassy in Syria after 2011, while many others have closed, withdrawn their ambassadors, or temporarily relocated to Beirut. In March 2012, local lawmakers in Iraq's Duhok Governorate voted to open camp for refugees from Syria. Although some of Iraq's Shiite clerics refused to give support to Assad, and Muqtada al-Sadr called on the Syrian president to step down from power, Iraq was once one of the few Arab countries to support the Syrian Assad regime, and has abstained from voting to expel Syria from the Arab league.

Both countries have closely cooperated with each other against the Islamic State, with Iraq being a part of the Russia–Syria–Iran–Iraq coalition which was formed as a consequence of an agreement reached at the end of September 2015 between Russia, Iran, Iraq and Ba'athist Syria to "help and cooperate in collecting information about the terrorist Daesh group (ISIS) to combat the advances of the group", according to the statement issued by the Iraqi Joint Operations Command.

From 2016 to 2024, Iraqi volunteers have been fighting alongside the Syrian Arab Army, and their forces have met on the Iraqi-Syrian border crossing. In February 2017, Iraq conducted its first airstrike against ISIL targets in Syria, which was performed in coordination with the Syrian government. In July 2017, Iraq, along with Iran, signed an agreement to boost military cooperation with Syria. A vital border crossing near the town of Al-Qaim that links the capitals of Iraq and Syria, was re-opened on 30 September 2019, after being seized by ISIS jihadists since 2014.

During the 2024 fall of the Assad regime in Syria led by Hay'at Tahrir al-Sham (HTS), Iraq and Shia PMF militias opted not to send troops to the country. Around 2,000 soldiers linked to Assad militias entered Iraq with the country's permission seeking refuge immediately prior to the fall of Damascus, bringing tanks and military equipment with them.

=== Regional security cooperation ===
In March 2025, high-level delegations from Iraq, Syria, Turkey, and Jordan met in Amman to discuss security cooperation. The meeting, organized to combat terrorism and organized crime, follows an announcement by Turkish Foreign Minister Hakan Fidan regarding joint steps against the Islamic State, with foreign ministers, defense ministers, and intelligence heads participating.

== See also ==
- Mesopotamia
- Fertile Crescent Plan
- Foreign relations of Iraq
- Foreign relations of Syria
- Iraqis in Syria
- Kurdistan Region–Syria relations
- Syria (region)
- Shia crescent
- Shia–Sunni relations
- Syrian Social Nationalist Party (Political party seeking the union of Iraq, the Levant, Kuwait and Sinai)
- WMD conjecture after the 2003 invasion of Iraq#Syria

== Bibliography ==
- Baram, Amazia; Yaniv, Avner (1986). "Ideology and Power Politics in Syrian-Iraqi Relations, 1968–1984". In Maoz, Moshe (ed.). Syria Under Assad. Routledge. ISBN 9781317818380.
- Drysdale, Alasdair (1992). "Syria and Iraq — the geopathology of a relationship". GeoJournal. 28 (3). Springer Science and Business Media LLC: 347–355. doi:10.1007/BF00817911.
- Eppel, Michael (1996). "Syrian‐Iraqi relations during the 1948 Palestine War". Middle Eastern Studies. 32 (3). Informa UK Limited: 74–91. doi:10.1080/00263209608701119.
- Harris, William W. (2012). Lebanon: A History, 600-2011. Oxford University Press. ISBN 9780190217839.
- Hinnebusch, Raymond; Ehteshami, Anoushiravan (2002). The Foreign Policies of Middle East States. Lynne Rienner Publishers. ISBN 9781588260208.
- Hinnebusch, Raymond (2014). "Syria-Iraq relations: state construction and deconstruction and the MENA state system". LSE Middle East Centre paper (04). doi:10.21953/LSE.RO.60004.
- Kienle, Eberhard (1990). Ba'ath Versus Ba'ath: The Conflict Between Syria and Iraq. Bloomsbury Academic. ISBN 9781850431923.
- Mansour, Imad; Thompson, William R. (2020). Shocks and Rivalries in the Middle East and North Africa. Georgetown University Press. ISBN 9781626167681.
- Rasheed, Amjed Majeed (2017). Syro-Iraqi Relations: The Puzzle of the Perpetual Rivalry (Thesis). Durham University.
- Rasheed, Amjed (2023). Power and Paranoia in Syria-Iraq Relations: The Impact of Hafez Assad and Saddam Hussain. Taylor & Francis. ISBN 9781000844740.
