= Kurds in Jordan =

People of Kurdish origin in Jordan

Total population
- 30,000–100,000 ~1% of the population

Regions with significant populations
- Amman, Irbid, Salt and Zarqa

Languages
- Arabic, Kurdish

Religion
- Sunni Islam

Related ethnic groups
- Iranian peoples, Kurdish diaspora

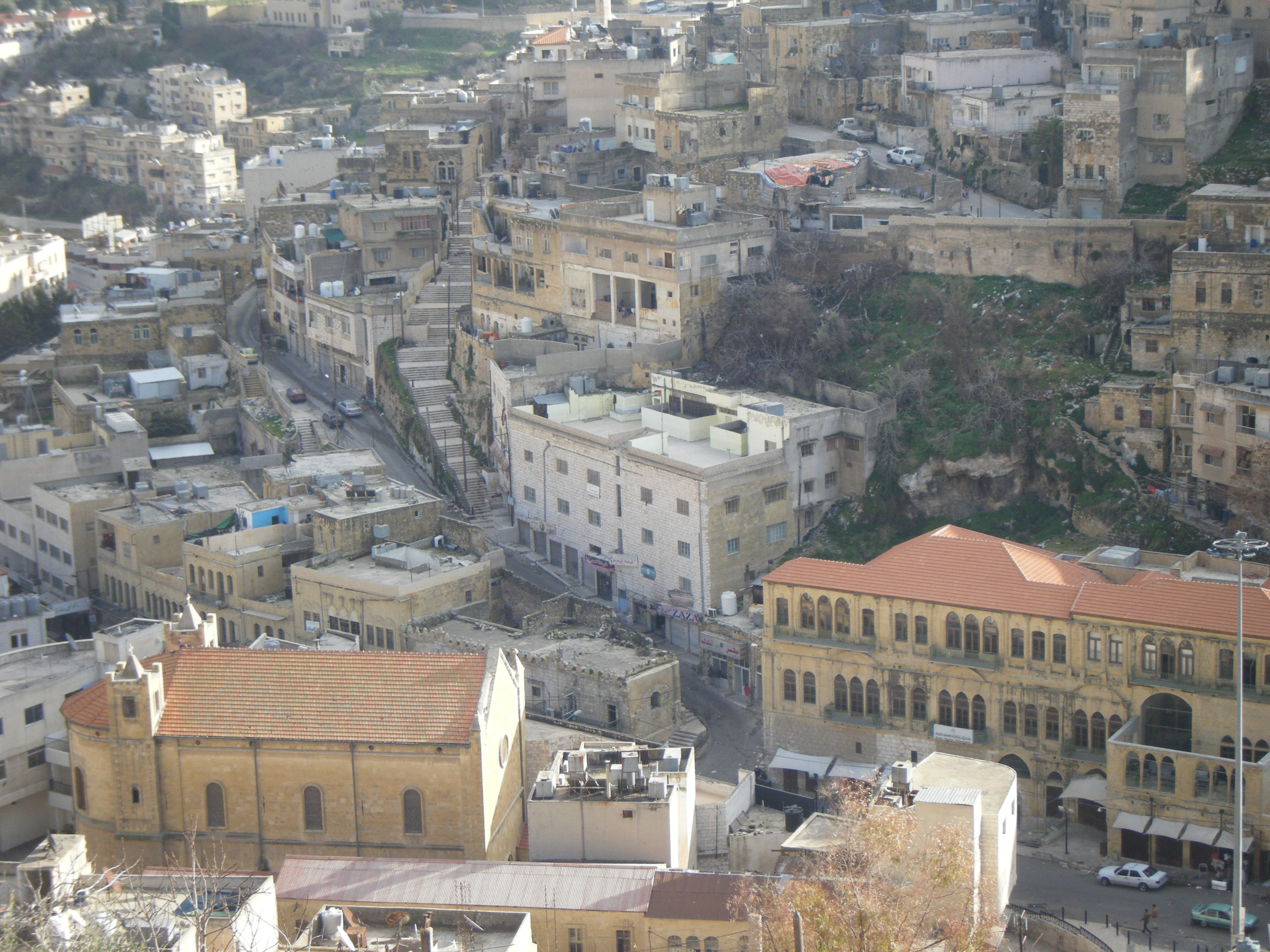

Kurds in Jordan refers to people born in or residing in Jordan who are of Kurdish origin. The Kurdish population in Jordan is approximately 30,000 and they mainly live in the cities of Amman, Irbid, Salt and Zarqa. The approximately 100 years old community are almost completely integrated into the Jordanian society. Because of the integration of the Kurdish community, they do not have a granted seat in the Parliament of Jordan.

Kurds have been living in Jordan since 1173 with the establishment of Saladin's Ayyubid dynasty. Kurds in the military of the Ottoman Empire later settled in Salt. Kurds fled to Jordan as a result of the Kurdish massacres in Turkey in the 1920s and 1930s, more Kurds arrived to Jordan from Israel during the 1948 Palestinian expulsion and flight and the 1967 Palestinian exodus and later Kurdish refugees arrived to Jordan from Iraq after the Gulf War. There are also many Iranian Kurds in Jordan as refugees as a result of the Islamic revolution of Iran.

== See also ==
- Ethnic groups in Jordan
- Kurdish population
- Saad Jumaa
- Jordan–Kurdistan Region relations
