= Iraq–Lebanon relations =

- Iraq: Lebanon

Iraq-Lebanon relations are between the nations of Lebanon and Iraq. The relationship goes back to ancient times. The ancient Phoenicians, who came from modern-day Lebanon, the coast of Syria, and Northern Palestine. whom traded Tyrian purple dyes, cedar trees, glass, metals, spices, and perfumes with Ancient Iraq. Ancient Babylon besieged the ancient Phoenician city of Tyre for 13 years.

== Historical relations ==
Iraqi–Lebanese relations have been close throughout history, both politically and culturally. Iraq and Lebanon have maintained diplomatic relations since 1943. Both countries refused to recognize Israel and recognized the State of Palestine.

Iraq under the Ba'athist regime of Saddam Hussein had strong relations with the Lebanese Forces, the Kataeb (Phalangists), and Michel Aoun during the war of Liberation.

Lebanon's prime minister traveled to Baghdad in August 2008, which was the only third such visit by a top Arab leader since the U.S.-led invasion in 2003. Fouad Siniora called his one-day trip an opportunity to renew contact after more than a decade of chilly relations between Beirut and Baghdad. At a news conference alongside Siniora, Iraqi Prime Minister Nouri al-Maliki said the two countries would sign several agreements soon, including one on Iraq exporting oil to Lebanon.

Lebanon's majority leader, Saad Hariri visited Iraq in July 2008, followed by Jordan's King Abdullah II, the first Arab head of state to fly to Baghdad since the 2003 war.

Relations between Lebanon and Iraq soured in the mid-1990s after Iraqi agents killed a dissident in Beirut. But the two maintained embassies in each other's capitals even after the 2003 U.S.-led invasion of Iraq.

== Political relations ==
Both countries are members of the Arab League and the Group of 77.

== Cultural relations ==
In 2023, both countries lifted visa requirements for their citizens.

== Military relations ==
In December 2021, Lebanon and Iraq signed a defense-related memorandum of understanding, related to developing bilateral military relations between the two countries.

In May, Iraqi Prime Minister Mohammed Shia' al-Sudani reaffirmed the country's support for Lebanon politically and militarily. Al-Sudani "Emphasized Iraq’s continued commitment to providing support and solidarity, especially in confronting the ongoing Israeli aggression and any threats to Lebanon’s security and sovereignty.”

Additionally, both countries contain militant groups part of the Axis of Resistance.

== Economic relations ==
On 29 March 2025, Iraq agreed to extend its fuel supply agreement with Lebanon for another six months to help alleviate Lebanon’s ongoing power crisis. The deal, initially established in July 2021, involves Iraq supplying heavy fuel oil in exchange for Lebanese services, including healthcare for Iraqi citizens. Lebanon then swaps the fuel for gas oil to run its struggling power plants, which have faced worsening shortages amid the country’s financial crisis.

As of August 16th, 2024, there are currently 900 Lebanese companies operating in Iraq, with 600 in the capital of Baghdad and 300 in the Kurdistan Region.

== Resident diplomatic missions ==
- Iraq has an embassy in Beirut.
- Lebanon has an embassy in Baghdad.

== See also ==
- Iraqis in Lebanon
- Foreign relations of Iraq
- Foreign relations of Lebanon
