= Prostitution in Syria =

Prostitution in Syria is illegal, but the law is not strictly enforced. UNAIDS estimate there are 25,000 prostitutes in the country.

Since the start of the Syrian Civil War, many women have fled the country and turned to prostitution to survive in Jordan, Turkey and the Lebanon.

Sex trafficking and child sex tourism are problems in Syria.

== History ==
During the era of slavery in Syria prostitution was connected to slavery. The Islamic Law formally prohibited prostitution. However, since the principle of concubinage in Islam in Islamic Law allowed a man to have sexual intercourse with his female slave, prostitution was practiced by a pimp selling his female slave on the slave market to a client, who was allowed to have intercourse with her as her new owner, and who then returned his ownership to her pimp on the pretext of discontent after having had intercourse with her, which was a legal and accepted method for prostitution in the Islamic world.

Ismail al-Jazari (1136–1206) describes a Damascus procuress in his writings. She recruited women for work as prostitutes at weddings. She took the women to a safe place out of town where her husband was the pimp. Eventually they were arrested. The woman confessed during torture and was strangled. The husband fled and was never caught.

In Ottoman Syria prostitution (of free women) was tolerated. By the 18th-century, local Ottoman authorities in the Ottoman Empire, such as in Damascus in Syria and in Egypt, had begun to tolerate clandestine prostitution of free women in exchange for taxation.

Under the French Mandate (1923−1946), there was a system of legal and regulated prostitution . At the beginning of the Mandate 742 prostitutes were registered, but it is thought the actual number was much higher.

From 2003 onward, many women fleeing from the war in Iraq were practising underworld prostitution for living. Some sources claim up to 50 thousand Iraqi refugee women in Syria, many of them are recent widows or orphans with no professional qualification, started prostitution as the only source for earning a living.

== Sex tourism ==
In the 2000s, the country was a destination for sex tourism by the Arab world, particularly Saudi Arabia. The large number of Iraqi women and children who were forced to turn to prostitution to survive, or were trafficked, ensured a large number of prostitutes were available for tourists.

In the Saidnaya suburb of Damascus, there were over 100 'tourist clubs' where mainly underage girls mostly of iraqi descent were available.

After the start of the civil war, tourism dropped off.

== Sex trafficking ==
Syria is a source and destination country for women, and children subjected to sex trafficking. The situation in Syria continues to deteriorate amid the ongoing civil war. More than half of Syria's pre-war population of 23 million has been displaced; as of March 2017, five million have fled to neighbouring countries and, as of December 2016, roughly 6.3 million are internally displaced. Syrians, both those that remain in the country and refugees in neighbouring countries, continue to be highly vulnerable to trafficking.

In March 2016, the media reported that women from Nepal and Bangladesh were forced to work in the sex industry in Syria. In June 2014, ISIS announced the establishment of an Islamic "Caliphate" in Iraq and Syria. ISIS routinely forces Syrian girls to undergo virginity tests before trading them in "slave bazaars" and sending them to various Syrian provinces and other countries for sexual slavery. ISIS incursion into Assyrian villages in the northeastern province of Al-Hasaka, captured as many as 30 Assyrian Christian women and forced them into sexual slavery.

The Syrian refugee population is highly vulnerable to trafficking in neighbouring countries, particularly Jordan, Lebanon, Iraq, and Turkey. Syrian refugee women and girls are vulnerable to forced or "temporary marriages"—for the purpose of prostitution and other forms of exploitation, and sex trafficking in refugee camps, in Jordan, and cities in the Iraqi Kurdistan Region (IKR), including Sulaymaniyah. In Baghdad, Basrah, and other cities in southern Iraq, reports from 2015 indicated some Syrian refugee women were forced into prostitution by a trafficking network in hotels and brothels after agents of the network promised to resettle them from the IKR. In Turkey and Lebanon, reports continue of illicit prostitution rings of Syrian refugee women and girls, which are administered by local men, while the Lebanese police issued reports in 2014 detailing the sale of Syrian refugee women by local men. LGBTI persons among the Syrian refugee population in Lebanon are reportedly vulnerable to sex trafficking by Lebanese pimps.

The United States Department of State Office to Monitor and Combat Trafficking in Persons ranks Syria as a 'Tier 3' country.
