= Assyrians in Jordan =

ܣܘܪ̈ܝܐ ܕܝܘܪܕܢܢ الآشوريون في الأردن
- (Assyrian homeland) (Jordan)

Total population
- Official: 10,000-15,000 (mostly refugees) Estimates: 100,000-150,000

Regions with significant populations
- Marka area Jabal Amman; Abdali area Fuheis

Languages
- Neo-Aramaic (Assyrian Neo-Aramaic, Turoyo); Jordanian Arabic

Religion
- Syriac Christianity

Assyrians in Jordan (Syriac: ܣܘܪ̈ܝܐ ܕܝܘܪܕܢܢ; Arabic: الآشوريون في الأردن), or Jordanian Assyrians are Assyrian people or people of Assyrian descent living in the Hashemite Kingdom of Jordan.

The current population of Assyrians in Jordan is believed to be between 10-15,000, most of them being refugees from Iraq. The majority of these Assyrians live in the capital of Amman and its surrounding districts.

== History ==
Assyrian presence in Jordan began after the Assyrian genocide, where small numbers of families settled in cities like Amman, Madaba, Zarqa, and Ajloun. Around the same time, Assyrians fleeing the genocide decided to flee to Palestine and what is now Israeli-territory near Bethlehem and Jerusalem, until the Nakba caused them to flee to Jordan alongside the Palestinians. As they arrived in Jordan, they began to take up professions such as agriculture and construction, and pursue higher education in the majority-Arabic language. They also established their own organizations and places of community, including churches, television stations, and connections to the wider Assyrian diaspora.

Jordan has traditionally been a temporary stop for Assyrians who choose to immigrate to other countries in the diaspora. Following the 2003 invasion of Iraq and the Fall of Mosul, Assyrians from Iraq would flee en masse to Jordan to escape persecution, often in poor psychological condition. Many of these Assyrians were native to the Nineveh Plains and villages in the Kurdistan Region, or living in Baghdad, before economic and human rights concerns prompted immigration.

== Population ==
The Assyrian Policy Institute has previously written the Assyrian population in Jordan as being between 10,000-15,000, most of them being refugees from Iraq. Other estimates by the Assyrian International News Agency suggest that as of 2007, 100-150,000 Assyrians were living in the country.

Living conditions for Assyrians in Jordan, particularly refugees, has previously been described as poor, with high unemployment and inability to meet most rent costs. According to API, Assyrians were struggling to make ends meet in overcrowded neighborhoods, with rising issues for the Economy of Jordan exacerbating these challenges.

== Religion ==
The majority of Assyrians who live in Jordan are members of the Chaldean Catholic Church, though smaller communities of the Syriac Orthodox Church and Assyrian Church of the East are also present.

== See also ==
- Iraqis in Jordan
