= Urban refugee =

Refugee who settles in an urban area rather than in a refugee camp

A map of refugees in Uganda in August 2016, showing Kampala as an "urban refugee location".

An urban refugee is a refugee who decided or was obliged to settle in an urban area rather than in a refugee camp in the country or territory where the person fled to. More than 60% of the world's refugee population and 80% of internally displaced persons (IDP) under UNHCR mandate live in urban environments. In 2009, their number was around 5.5 million people. "Urban refugee" is not a recognized legal term in the 1951 Convention relating to the Status of Refugees. However, the UNHCR has adopted a 'Policy on Refugee Protection and Solutions in Urban Areas' in 2009.

Urban refugees are among the most vulnerable groups in low income countries. According to UNHCR, the urban refugee population worldwide is very diverse, comprising a large number of women, children, and older people who have particular protection challenges. The urban refugee population face specific protecting needs attendant to urban environments: they may lack access to services, health, education and are often confronted to xenophobic attitudes in their country of asylum.

The overwhelming majority of refugees living in urban areas are to be found in the poorest and more conflict-affected regions of the world. Africa and Asia concentrate the highest number of urban refugee populations. Some war-affected countries host a huge number of both urban internally displaced people and refugees in capital cities (such as Kampala or Khartoum). Urban displaced people also live in the main cities of their country of origin: after protracted exile, many returnees prefer settling back as IDPs in cities and towns of their own country upon return.

Since around 2017, the UNHCR prioritizes urban refugees for resettlement over those refugees living in refugee camps. In Kenya, for example, only refugees living in Nairobi are submitted for resettlement places, and not those refugees living in the refugee camp site of Kakuma or Dadaab. However, Kenya's national refugee policy requires all refugees to live in camps, though this requirement is not strongly enforced.

== Reasons for living in urban areas ==
Reasons for living in urban settings rather than in refugee camps could be specific medical care needs that cannot be provided for in camps, poor and uncertain conditions in camps, or higher than average educational achievements and aspirations, as camps do not provide many higher education opportunities. There is insufficient physical and material security in some camps. Certain groups of refugees, such as LGBTI refugees and women at high risk of gender-based violence, especially cannot be sufficiently protected from other refugees in the camps. Or it could simply be the fact that the state or territory where refugees fled to does not run refugee camps (e.g. Syria or Egypt). Some refugees leave camps in search of better economic opportunities in urban centres and to avoid being dependent on aid rations. Some even move back and forth between urban centres and refugee camps to get the best of both.

A disadvantage is that the UNHCR and other aid agencies cannot legally protect and support refugees dispersed in urban settings as much as in camps.

== Notable urban refugee settlements ==
- Amman, Jordan: 162,061
- Bangui, Central African Republic: 496,731
- Baku, Azerbaijan: 203,906
- Beirut, Lebanon: 26,000
- Belgrade, Serbia: 57,542
- Cairo, Egypt: around 30,000 Sudanese refugees (also see sudanese refugees in Egypt)
- Cape Town, South Africa
- Damascus, Syria: the majority of a total of around 63,000 Iraqi refugees in Syria (also see Iraqis in Syria)
- Kampala, Uganda: over 57,000 refugees and asylum seekers
- Kandahar and Kabul, Afghanistan: 55,000 each
- Kathmandu, Nepal: 500 Rohingya and Sri Lankan refugees as well as Ahmadiyyas from Pakistan
- Kuala Lumpur, Malaysia: 62,200

== Urban refugees by country and population size ==
Populations of UNHCR refugees in urban areas between 2014 and 2006
Country	Urban area	2014	2013	2012	2011	2010	2009	2008	2007	2006
Angola	Luanda			12,300	12,323	11,315	11,096	15,895	14,990	2,638
Argentina	Buenos Aires								4,310	4,025
Armenia	Yerevan	16,818	12,729	7,385	3,679	4,087	1,682	1,861	1,798	51,330
Azerbaijan	Baku	203,906	195,824	189,966	1,793	3,981	2,170	186,909	166,489	164,650
Brazil	Rio de Janeiro	1,795	1,899	2,262	2,106	2,103				
Brazil	São Paulo	5,527	3,289	2,530	1,998	1,795				
Burkina Faso	Ouagadougou		1,597	1,734	1,211	1,065	1,058	1,161	1,133	1,267
Burundi	Bujumbura	22,789	22,662	21,901	23,485	21,253	12,227	9,307	12,773	9,986
Congo	Brazzaville	12,293	8,089	7,019	6,547	8,549	8,703	7,185	8,630	3,493
Democratic Republic of Congo	Kinshasa	2,325	10,381	10,447	15,840	15,838	15,816	25,571	25,605	28,451
Egypt	Alexandria	28,505	29,785	3,514						
Egypt	Cairo	51,126	42,448	15,546	101,405	98,602	107,913	112,605	112,515	104,467
Egypt	Giza	16,976	14,648	5,101	6,002	5,131				
Ethiopia	Addis Ababa	6,042	4,813	4,346	2,640	2,822	1,802	1,526	1,014	
Gabon	Libreville	1,394	2,167	2,308	5,153	4,527	4,338	4,332	4,089	3,939
Ghana	Accra	2,797	2,560	3,956	4,344	1,040	740	1,283	2,151	5,865
India	Delhi	30,939	26,396	22,050	20,484	18,569	17,881	15,042	13,835	12,241
Indonesia	Jakarta	1,961	1,520	1,268			2,567			
Iraq	Babylon		16,986	36,144	48,092	56,002	63,086			
Iraq	Baghdad	11,746	263,485	480,336	489,496	428,647	707,235	10,575	13,020	14,381
Ivory Coast	Abidjan	1,585	1,810	1,699	4,546	3,738	3,583	3,585	483,931	485,466
Thailand	Bangkok	8,598	4,112	2,423	2,072	6,702	6,944	6,466	6,424	6,481
Turkey	Ankara	1,382	2,352							
Uganda	Kampala	72,019	43,379	69,476	42,500	37,820	26,994	18,377	4,992	4,646
Syria	Damascus	456,225	24,461	52,240	80,305					49,647
Senegal	Dakar	4,313	3,849	3,691	3,819	2,912	3,570	3,595	3,456	3,595
Libya	Tripoli	36,868	32,169	13,617	13,025	11,117	12,322			4,754
Macedonia	Skopje	1,290	1,468	1,610	1,672	2,310	1,474	1,621	1,701	1,790
Morocco	Rabat				1,351	1,072	1,091	1,235	1,457	
Mexico	Mexico City				1,395	1,567	1,331	1,073	1,665	2,578
Sierra Leone	Kenema				2,027	1,947	2,256	1,622	1,988	2,303
South Korea	Seoul	3,430	2,373	1,762	1,364			1,243	1,220	
South Sudan	Juba	6,071	5,819	5,255						
Sudan	Kassala	4,614	4,867	4,906	4,910	4,789			6,000	6,000
Turkey	Istanbul	13,784	5,674	2,995	2,979	2,039	1,737	2,805	2,772	2,305
Pakistan	Islamabad	34,408	35,227	34,316	35,567	36,787	32,156	32,940	35,041	
Somalia	Hargeisa	8,942	9,224	6,694	3,741	2,563				1,546
Zimbabwe	Harare	1,198	15,265	1,099	1,040	1,054	1,222			1,370
Sierra Leone	Freetown				1,824	2,224	2,234	1,881	1,686	2,821
Afghanistan	Kabul	60,881	55,491	130,761	147,037	133,426	13,470	38,740	30,670	34,517
Niger	Niamey	5,258	8,026	7,038						
Kenya	Nairobi	51,270	50,400	53,373	52,472	46,607	46,316	36,515	35,083	35,007
Gabon	Moanda				1,078	1,467	1,506	1,562	1,660	1,551
Mozambique	Maputo	2,368	2,367	2,380	2,371	1,693	1,530	1,524	1,516	1,297
Togo	Lomé	2,530	1,802	6,588	3,206	660	622	1,582	1,460	1,770
Nigeria	Lagos	964	1,707	3,097	5,114	5,301	4,975	4,385	3,492	4,400
Malaysia	Kuala Lumpur	190,621	260,552	101,836	97,618	92,857	76,419	45,998	39,511	46,356
Rwanda	Kigali	2,320	2,051	1,933	2,061	2,060	1,962	2,413	3,324	6,775
Sudan	Khartoum	72,017	36,260	31,969	10,661	9,782	31,325	18,241	911,664	
Venezuela	Caracas				1,846	1,633	1,435	1,148		
Vietnam	Ho Chi Minh City				7,200	7,200	7,200	7,200	7,200	7,200
Yemen	Aden	50,092	50,981	67,710	140,532	23,596	13,932	13,834	14,134	13,102
Yemen	'Amran	71,548	41,918	39,780	40,452	37,387	30,000			
Yemen	Sanaa	92,741	87,378	82,369	77,156	51,038	46,853	24,427	23,454	21,136
Yemen	Mukalla	9,306	8,810	8,662	8,107	5,757	2,646	2,646	2,646	692
