= Amal Al Khedairy =

Iraqui academic

Amal Al Khedairy (Arabic: أمل الخضيري; born 1928) is an Iraqi academic, lecturer, scholar, art historian and founder and director of the cultural centre "Al Beit Al Iraqi" ("The Iraqi House") in Baghdad. The centre would focus mostly on reviving Iraqi crafts and finding new avenues for them, as well as concerts and lectures; being the only institution of its kind in Baghdad to do so during the 90s. It was the only private center in Iraq focusing on Iraqi craft and heritage in Baghdad during the mid eighties until the fall of Baghdad on 9 April 2003.

== Biography ==
Amal Al Khedairy was born in Damascus, French Syria, 1928, to a Syrian mother and well-known Iraqi father, Yasseen Al Khedairy, whose family has deep roots in Iraq since the 15th century. Her father's family are connected to the Shammar tribe who originated from Najd in the Arabian Peninsula. They later settled in the old quarter of Baghdad, close to the Mausoleum of al-Gilani in the Bab al-Sheikh neighborhood, where her father would build a home later to become Amal's "Al Beit Al Iraqi" in 1988; which was destroyed in a bombing by the American forces during the 2003 invasion of Iraq on April 4, 2003.

She studied at the University of London in the 1950s and also in Lausanne, Switzerland.

Fluent in Arabic, English and French, with conversational Turkish and Spanish, Khedairy has been a lecturer at both the University of Baghdad, in the College of Architecture and the Women's College.

Al Khedairy has one son, Munir El-Kadi (born 1970) and she resides between Amman, Jordan and Baghdad, Iraq.
