= Iraq–Jordan relations =

- Iraq: Jordan

Relations between neighbours Iraq and Jordan have historically been close. The two states were created after World War I from former Ottoman dominions by way of a secret bilateral agreement between the United Kingdom of Great Britain and Ireland and the French Third Republic. Several efforts to unify the countries have been pursued over the last century. Jordan has an embassy in Baghdad and Iraq has an embassy in Amman.

== History ==
Ba'athist Iraq–Jordan relations

- Iraq: Jordan

As the two original Hashemite monarchies established in Western Asia by Britain following World War I and the collapse of the Ottoman Empire, Jordan and Iraq had initially maintained close relations based on family ties. This ended when the Hashemite royal family in Iraq was overthrown and killed by dissident military officers in the 1958 Iraqi coup d'état. In the years that followed the two régimes became hostile to one another. But by the late 1970s, Jordan and Iraq built a bilateral alliance that lasted through the 1991 Persian Gulf War.

In 1979 Iraq initiated contacts aimed at closer alignment at a time when the newly established President Saddam Hussein was seeking Arab allies, perhaps to provide for at least some level of transnational support and inter-Arab legitimacy for his régime. More important for the Jordanians, however, were the economic pay-offs of such an alliance, as Iraq could provide economic support and oil supplies that the kingdom desperately needed.

As the new alliance began to solidify in 1980, Saddam Hussein's military forces invaded Iran and Hussein of Jordan immediately backed Iraq against the revolutionary Islamist regime in Iran. The Hashemite government viewed Iran as a potential threat not from military expansion, but as a supporter and living example of Islamist revolutionary militancy against conservative pro-Western monarchies. For King Hussein, Iran was a threat not just to his régime's security directly, but also indirectly in so far as it threatened the Persian Gulf Arab monarchies oil which Jordan was partially reliant for aid. Throughout the 1980-88 Iran-Iraq war, Jordan supported Iraq politically and especially economically. Indeed, Jordan's port of Aqaba and its overland trucking routes became Iraq's main supply line throughout the eight years of that war. In return, Jordan received oil from Iraq at prices far below market value.

To expand on these political-economic linkages, Jordan helped create the Arab Cooperation Council (ACC) in 1989, in the immediate aftermath of the Iran-Iraq war. The ACC alliance of Jordan, Iraq, Egypt, and Yemen was meant to facilitate capital and labor flows between members while also allowing them to act as a fairly formidable lobbying bloc within inter-Arab politics in their mutual efforts to renegotiate their debt terms with the Persian Gulf Arab monarchies. Despite strenuous Jordanian efforts to prevent it, that alliance evaporated in the heat of the Persian Gulf War.

The shift in Iraq–Jordan relations became apparent in August 1995, when Jordan granted political asylum to two Iraqi defectors. King Hussein of Jordan also openly criticized Iraqi policies on national television on 23 August 1995. However, majority of Jordanians supported Saddam Hussein. Western countries considered the change in Jordan's policy on Iraq as a means to further isolate Saddam Hussein and eventually weaken his leadership.

Despite periodic crises of confidence and lingering Iraqi resentment over Jordan's close ties with Saddam Hussein, the two countries forged deep ties. In the face of repeated attacks and threats, Jordan has maintained a strong diplomatic presence in Baghdad.

The economic impact of the Iraq crisis in Jordan has been mixed. Jordan has benefited greatly from serving as a "gateway" to Iraq for governments, aid workers, contractors, and businesspeople, the real estate and banking sectors are booming, and it stands to reap more benefits from increased trade and transport should the situation in Iraq improve. However, with the fall of Saddam, Jordan lost the sizable oil subsidies and customary shipments it received from Iraq. One of Jordan's principal economic interests in the new Iraq is securing future energy assistance.

== Current affairs ==
Jordan can claim only modest influence over developments in Iraq. The kingdom does have notable intelligence capabilities vis-à-vis Iraq, and it reportedly helped the United States track down and kill Al-Qaeda in Iraq leader Abu Musab al-Zarqawi. Although some Jordanians highlight cross-border tribal and family connections with Iraqi Sunni Arabs, they pale in comparison to those of Iran, Turkey, and Syria. Jordan's most significant means of influence is its hosting of a large and ever-changing Iraqi expatriate community, mostly of Sunni Arab origin.

Jordanian leaders worry that Iraq is becoming a haven for terrorist groups, a fear dramatically heightened by the November 2005 suicide bombings in Amman. Jordan also has an interest in the development of Iraq and is anxious about the growing Iranian involvement in Iraqi politics, and more broadly increasing Iranian and Shiite influence in the region.

In 2005, the case of Raed Mansour al-Banna, a Jordanian suicide bomber who blew himself up in Hillah, Iraq strained relations between the two countries. After Banna's family gave him a heroic funeral in Jordan, thousands of Iraqi Shia protested, and the two countries recalled their respective ambassadors.

On 24 December 2012, Iraq and Jordan agreed to extend an oil pipeline to the Red Sea city of Aqaba for the export of Iraqi crude. The new pipeline would be capable of pumping one million barrels per day. Jordanian Prime Minister Abdullah al-Nsur stated that Jordan is important for Iraq's trade and the export of its oil. Iraq also agreed to implement a 2009 agreement to establish a free trade zone between the two countries and increase the capacity of its gas pipeline to secure Jordan's Iraqi natural gas needs. Jordan relies on imports for 95 percent of its energy needs. A rise in fuel prices by up to 53 percent in November prompted violent protests in which three people were killed and more than 70 injured. Iraq, which sits on the region's third largest oil reserves after Saudi Arabia and Iran at 115 billion barrels, hopes the move will increase and diversify its exports. Jordan imports 10,000 barrels of Iraqi oil per day at well below the global market value, and has agreed to increase that amount to 15,000 barrels. Iraq delivered oil to Jordan for preferential prices under the U.N. oil-for-food program during the rule of Saddam Hussein.

Iraq's contribution to the world's oil supply will significantly increase to more than 8 million barrels a day by 2035, outstripping its current output, according to the International Energy Agency. In its "Iraq Energy Outlook" report, the IEA said the country's oil and gas reserves would be key to its own future, as well as playing an essential role in stabilizing the global energy markets. It is expected that Iraq will dominate oil supply over the coming decades and will become the world's largest oil exporter after Russia by the 2030s.

In 2013, trade between Iraq and Jordan has been facilitated by Israel, which allows goods to be transported by truck via the Jordan River Crossing near Beit She'an. The goods are usually taken to Haifa Port and shipped from there to Turkey and other countries, as an alternative to Syria.

In 2014, the land trade route between Iraq and Jordan was severely affected by the deteriorating security situation in Anbar province linking the two countries. ISIS had seized large parts of the province and imposed high taxes on the trucks passing through. Before the instability in the province, 70% of the exports originating from Jordanian Free Zones went to the Iraqi market, but after the sudden takeover of Mosul and other parts of Iraq in June 2014 the trade decreased by 19% for the period of June–September 2014 compared to a year before.

Iraq and Jordan signed on May 4, 2023, a memorandum of understanding (MoU) that will ensure a supply of crude oil from Iraq to Jordan. This memorandum was extended during 2024 on July, and as of June 2025, the Jordanians have requested to extend it again.

== Resident diplomatic missions ==
- Iraq has an embassy in Amman.
- Jordan has an embassy in Baghdad and a consulate-general in Erbil.

== See also ==
- 2003 Jordanian embassy bombing in Baghdad
- Agriculture in Jordan
- Arab Federation of Iraq and Jordan
- Fertile Crescent Plan
- Foreign relations of Iraq
- Foreign relations of Jordan
- House of Hashim
- Iraq–Jordan border
- Iraqis in Jordan
