= Samir Habashneh =

Jordanian politician (born 1951)

Minister of State Minister of Agriculture
- In office 9 February 2011 – 17 October 2011

Minister of Interior
- In office 2003-2003 with Ali Abu Ragheb – 2003-2005 with Faisal AlFayez

Senator
- In office 2001-2003/ – 2005-2008

Minister of Culture
- In office 1995–1996

Personal details
- Born: November 5, 1951 (age 74) Bethlehem (Palestine)
- Education: Baghdad University (BSc 1974)
- Profession: Minister (government)

Samir Habashneh (born 1951) is a Jordanian politician. Previously he had served as the Minister of State, Minister of Agriculture for Jordan and Minister of the Interior.

Born in 1951, Habashneh earned his BSc in agricultural engineering from Baghdad University in 1974. He worked in the Agricultural Cooperative Society and then as a consultant at the Ministry of Youth in 1992. In 1993, he became a deputy in Parliament, representing the southern Governorate of Karak. He was appointed Minister of Culture in 1995 and became a senator in 2001. He was a member of the Jordan First Committee and a member in the Jordanian Parties Committee. He was the Minister of the Interior until April 2005., Between 9 February 2011 and 17 October 2011, he had served as Minister of Agriculture.

== See also ==
- Cabinet of Jordan
