= Jack Marshall (author) =

American poet and writer

- Born: February 25, 1936 (age 90); Brooklyn, New York City, New York, United States
- Occupations: Poet, writer

Jack Marshall (born 1936) is an American poet and author. He was born to an Iraqi father, and a Syrian mother of Jewish heritage.

== Early life ==
Jack Marshall was born on February 25, 1936, in Brooklyn, New York. He was raised speaking Arabic in a Mizrahi Jewish household, ruled by traditional Arab Jewish culture. His father worked in the fabric industry. He attended public school as well as a Hebrew school in his neighborhood.

Marshall attended Brooklyn College, where he studied literature. The Young Men's Hebrew Association (YMHA) is where he attended night classes in poetry in 1960 with poets Robert Lowell and Stanley Kunitz.

== Career and accolades ==
He is the author of numerous books and poems which reflect and explore his cultural heritage. Two examples, From Baghdad to Brooklyn: Growing Up in a Jewish-Arabic Family in Midcentury America, along with Millennium Fever:Poems, proved very successful. He was awarded the PEN West Award and was also a finalist for the National Book Critics Circle Award, for From Baghdad to Brooklyn.

He is the recipient of two Bay Area Book Reviewers Awards. He was awarded a Guggenheim Fellowship in 2008.

== Personal life ==
He has lived in El Cerrito, California since the early 2000s.

== Works ==
- The Darkest Continent, For Now Press, (1967)
- Bearings, Harper & Row, (1970)
- Floats, Cedar Creek Press, (1971).
- Bits of Thirst, Blue Wind Press, (1976)
- Arriving on the Playing Fields of Paradise, Jazz Press, (1983)
- Arabian Nights, Coffee House Press, (1987)
- Sesame, Coffee House Press, (1993)
- Millennium Fever, Coffee House Press, (1996)
- Chaos Comics, Pennywhistle Press, (1994)
- Gorgeous Chaos; New & Selected Poems, Coffee House Press, (2002)
- From Baghdad to Brooklyn Coffee House Press, (October 1, 2005) ISBN 978-1-56689-174-5
