= Refugees of Iraq =

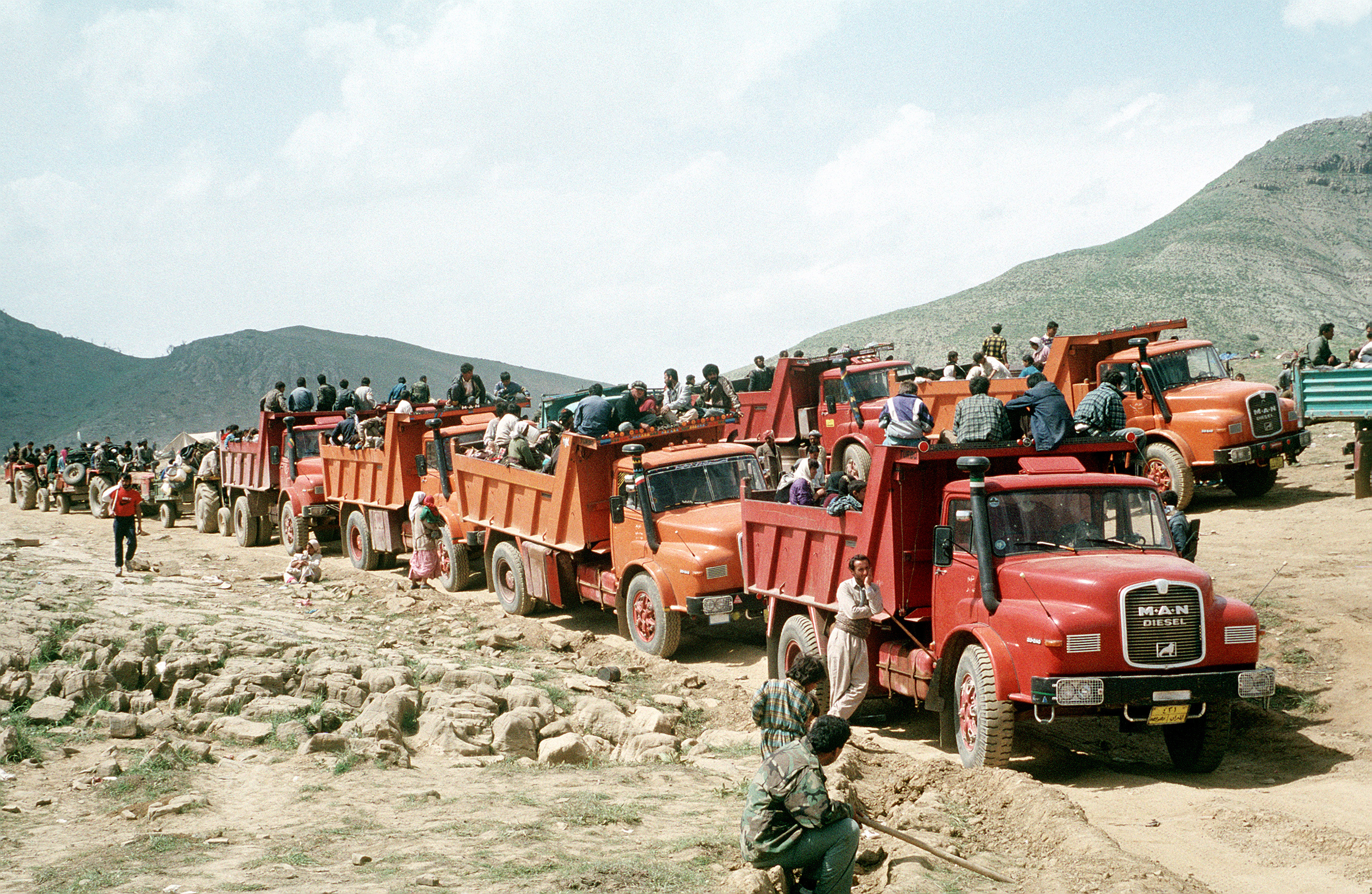
Iraqi Kurds fleeing to Turkey in April 1991, as part of Operation Provide Comfort during the Gulf War

Throughout the 20th century, Iraq witnessed multiple periods of instability and conflict that prompted the creation and flight of many refugees. Earlier examples include the exodus of Iraqi Jews and the flight of Iraqi Kurds. The Iraqi invasion of Iran in 1980 and the ensuing Iran–Iraq War (1980–1988) triggered a deterioration of ties among the country's various ethnic and religious communities, and also exacerbated in violent events like the Ba'athist Arabization campaigns in northern Iraq (1968–2003), which led to the killing and displacement of thousands of minorities. The Iraqi invasion of Kuwait (1990) and the ensuing Gulf War (1990–1991), which ended with Iraq's defeat and the application of United Nations sanctions (1991–2003), also resulted in the creation of many Iraqi refugees. It was not until the beginning of the ongoing Iraqi conflict, however, that sustained waves of Iraqi refugees would be created, numbering in the millions: the 2003 invasion of Iraq and the ensuing Iraq War (2003–2011) killed and displaced hundreds of thousands of Iraqis, both internally and externally, and the later War in Iraq (2013–2017) forced even more people to flee from the country. Many Iraqi refugees established themselves in urban areas of other countries rather than in refugee camps.

In April 2007, there were approximately four million Iraqi refugees around the world, including: 1.9 million within Iraq; two million in neighbouring Arab countries, as well as in Iran and Turkey; and approximately 200,000 outside of the Middle East entirely. The United Nations High Commissioner for Refugees (UNHCR) has led the humanitarian efforts for Iraqi refugees. The number of displaced persons and refugees from the Iraqi conflict is considered to be the largest in the Middle East, though this figure may now be lower than that of the refugees of the Syrian civil war.

As of 2024, Iraq is experiencing relative stability, but still faces significant humanitarian, development needs, and security challenges. The country has approximately 1.14 million internally displaced persons (IDP) after seeing 5 million IDP returnees. In 2024, the UNHCR enhanced the transitioning from emergency response to a longer-term development approach, emphasizing durable solutions and strengthening national systems to provide essential services like child protection and aid and assistance against gender-based violence.

== Reasons of refugee ==
=== Persian Gulf War ===
On August 2, 1990, Iraq invaded Kuwait. The ensuing 1991 Gulf War produced nearly three million refugees, many of them from Iraq. Almost all them left Iraq and Kuwait before the war started or after Desert Storm was over. The largest groups were the Kurds and Shi'as fleeing Saddam Hussein after a failed uprising, as well as the Palestinians. Palestinians were the second largest group uprooted by the war, and 300,000 resettled in Jordan. There were a smaller number of Iraqi Arab refugees, only about 37,000, mostly shia who moved to Saudi Arabia. About 100,000 Iraqis escaped to Jordan and Syria.

Shi'ites comprised 47% of the Iraqi population, but were excluded from the government by the Sunni Arabs. There was a Shia uprising in March 1991. Saddam Hussein regained control of the Shia dominated South in mid-March, and his cousin, Ali Hasan Majid, conducted public executions, bombarded city centers, and destroyed homes and mosques. 200,000 people died in the South between March and September 1991 from the violence. By 2003, there were 530,000 Iraqi refugees in Iran, mostly Shi’ite Arabs. Iraqi refugees in Iran were divided into three categories, the Shia Arabs, the Iraqi Kurds, and the Feyli Kurds.

1.85 million Kurds fled to the borders of Turkey and Iran. Unlike the Shi'ites, the Kurds had a recognized political leadership—the Patriotic Union of Kurdistan (PUK) and the Kurdistan Democratic Party (KDP) that took control of northern Iraq. As a result of this formal political leadership, the revolution in the Kurdish north was much less violent than in the Shi’ite South, and produced relatively few refugees and Internally Displaced Persons (IDPs).

In late March 1991, the Bush administration gave the Iraqi government permission to use helicopters against the Kurds. These were used to terrorize the Kurdish population. About 450,000 Kurds fled to the mountains bordering Turkey and Iran, and the Hussein government had retaken control of the main Kurdish cities by April 3, 1991. Turkey refused to allow the Kurds into the country, but there was significant media attention to the refugee population. The Kurds on the Iranian border were more isolated and received less media attention, but Iran admitted some groups of refugees and the physical conditions were less harsh than on the Turkish border.

In response to this humanitarian crisis, on April 8, 1991 the UN agreed to establish a safe haven in northern Iraq. To this end, two days later the US and its allies established the northern no-fly zone. This was in conjunction with the highly successful British initiative Operation Provide Comfort.

In response to the humanitarian crisis, the US tried to station unarmed aid workers in northern Iraq, but the Kurds refused to return. The US, the UK, France, the Netherlands, and Turkey then created a safe area between the cities of Amadiya, Dihok, and Zakho, and excluded the Iraqi military and police from the area. Near Zakho, the US military built a tent city to hold refugees, but it was not extensively used. The Kurds eventually moved to the safe area.

On February 15, 1991, President George H.W Bush called upon the Iraqi people to overthrow Saddam Hussein, which did not occur until 2003 under the administration of his son, President George W. Bush, and incited the recent Iraq War.

=== Iraq War (2003–2011) and civil war (2006–2008) ===
Refugees from Iraq have increased in number since the US-led invasion into Iraq in March 2003. After Saddam Hussein fell in 2003, over 30,000 refugees returned home within two years. But by 2006, they were fleeing again due to sectarian violence that culminated with the al-Askari mosque bombing in February 2006. The US occupation and ethnic conflict among Iraqis ended the minority Sunni governance and allowed the Shi’ite majority to regain control, which worried Iraq’s Sunni majority neighbors, including Saudi Arabia. Terrorist organizations like Al Qaeda have taken advantage of the chaos and violence to establish a presence in Iraq.

By February 16, 2007, António Guterres, the United Nations High Commissioner for Refugees, said that the external refugee number fleeing the war reached 2 million and that within Iraq there are an estimated 1.7 million internally displaced people. The refugee traffic out of the country has increased since the intensification of civil war.

As many as 110,000 Iraqis could be targeted as collaborators because of their work for coalition forces. A May 25, 2007 article notes that in the past seven months only 69 people from Iraq have been granted refugee status in the United States. Roughly 40% of Iraq's middle class is believed to have fled. Most are fleeing systematic persecution and have no desire to return.

=== Iraqi insurgency and civil war (2011–2017) ===
The last American troops in Iraq left in 2011. In 2009, Prime Minister Nouri al-Maliki began targeting Sunni leaders. Thus, militants in Iraq, who had been mostly been driven out by the American invasion, received a surge in popularity and support, and began using this opportunity to rebuild their ranks. Al-Maliki also replaced many military officers with loyalists. Tensions came to a head when al-Maliki arrested Vice President Tariq al-Hashimi, the most prominent Sunni politician.

The Arab Spring and Syrian Civil War were also ongoing at this time. Many Iraq militants crossed over into Syria, and ISIS, which had formed as an offshoot of Al-Qaeda in Iraq, seized large amounts of territory in Syria. They then launched an invasion into northern Iraq. They moved quickly, capturing Fallujah in January, Ramadi, Samarra, Mosul, Tikrit, in June, and Sinjar in August. 500,000 people in Mosul were displaced.

On August 3rd 2014, hundreds of ISIS fighters attacked Sinjar in northern Iraq, targeting the Yazidi community. Sinjar is a major Yazidi community. ISIS views the Yazidis as "devil-worshippers". 400,00 Yazidi were forced to flee their homes, with 5,000 men being executed and over 7,000 women and children captured and used as sex-slaves, some to ISIS fighters in Syria. Many boys were trained as child soldiers. ISIS also targeted other religious minorities, including Christians. Despite ISIS losing all territory from Iraq in 2017, many female survivors are unwilling or unable to return to their homes, remaining in displaced person camps.

=== ISIS insurgency (2017-present) ===
1 million people are internally displaced in Iraq since 2024 and $158.5 million are necessary in 2025 to make sure that operations and programmes in Iraq are continuous.

== Internally displaced Iraqis ==
There is also a significant number of Internally Displaced Persons (IDPs) in Iraq. As of September 2025 International Organization for Migration (IOM) estimated that there were about 1 million Iraqis displaced within the country. Recent statistics from United Nations High Commissioner for Refugees (UNHCR) state that as of 2024 there are 1 million internally displaced refugees within Iraq. As the war to eradicate ISIS continues, thousands of Iraqis are being displaced on a daily basis. Many IDPs face difficult conditions, and due to continued instability and lack of resource are unlikely to be able to go home.

At the end of July 2007 the NGO Coordinating Committee in Iraq (NCCI) and Oxfam International issued a report, Rising to the Humanitarian Challenge in Iraq, that declared that one-third of the populace was in need of aid. The NCCI is an alliance of approximately 80 international NGOs and 200 Iraqi NGOs, formed in Baghdad in 2003. The report, based on survey research of the nation's civilian population, found that 70 percent of the Iraqi population lacks proper access to water supplies. Only 20 percent of the population has proper sanitation and 30 percent of children experience malnutrition. About 92 percent of children experience problems learning. These figures represent sharp increases since 2003. There is a need to address the elderly, disabled population, and disadvantaged families through physical, mental, and social support to help them return to Iraq once the war ends and conditions are stabilized.

Since 2024 the closure of IDP camps in the Kurdistan Region of Iraq has seen many people to return to their place of residence rashly.

== Host countries ==
Iraqi refugees have mainly fled into urban centers across region, rather than in refugee camps. There are roughly 2 million Iraqi refugees living in countries neighboring Iraq and 95% of them still live in the Middle East - although other nations in Europe have begun to accept Iraqi refugees. It is difficult for refugees and their children to obtain legal status in a middle eastern country as they are treated as temporary "guests" rather than as "refugees". Current regional host countries include Syria, Jordan, Egypt, Lebanon, Kuwait, Iran, small numbers in Iraq, the Gulf States, and Turkey. Only Egypt and Turkey have signed the UNHCR refugee convention, and even then with heavy restrictions and limited effective protection.

=== Israel ===
Following the Farhud of 1941, many Jewish refugees sought ways to escape the violence in the Kingdom of Iraq, which had become an independent state in 1932. Following the independence of Israel in 1948, it became illegal for Iraqis to emigrate to Israel. In 1951-1952, the Israeli government clandestinely orchestrated the Operation Ezra and Nehemiah, during which almost the entire Jewish community was rescued, and initially settled in temporary refugee camps in Israel.

=== Jordan ===
Pre-war relations between Jordan and Iraq were positive, especially economically. By 2009, Jordan had taken in roughly 700,000 Iraqi refugees since the war began, a high proportion for a country of only 6 million. Until the end 2005, Iraqis were allowed into Jordan and could register as guests for 3–6 months without work authorization. Renewal became more difficult after 2005 when Iraqi terrorists associated with Al Qaeda bombed a Jordan hotel, and the number of unregistered Iraqis increased. In 2006, Jordan excluded single men and boys between age 17-35 from entering, then required all Iraqis produce a newly issued passport. In February 2008, the Jordanian government began requiring Iraqi refugees to apply for a Jordan visa in Iraq rather than at the Jordanian border. Only Iraqis who have been able to invest in Jordanian businesses or who employed in fields of national interest have been able to obtain long-term status and receive yearly residence permits, seek employment in specified fields, send their children to schools, and access public services.

In the capital city of Jordan, Amman, the population blames Iraqis for increasing cost of housing and inflation. Health facilities are free in Jordan regardless of legal status, but facilities in Iraqi neighborhoods are overstretched and many Iraqis are afraid of being identified as undocumented. Additionally, water infrastructure in Jordan is inadequate to support the large influx of refugees. A UNHCR-UNICEF international appeal to support the education of Iraqi children in Jordan, Syria, Egypt in Lebanon will give Jordan $80 million to absorb 50,000 Iraqi children into public schools. Most refugees in Jordan lack legal status and stay hidden for fear of deportation, making aid efforts difficult.

=== Syria ===
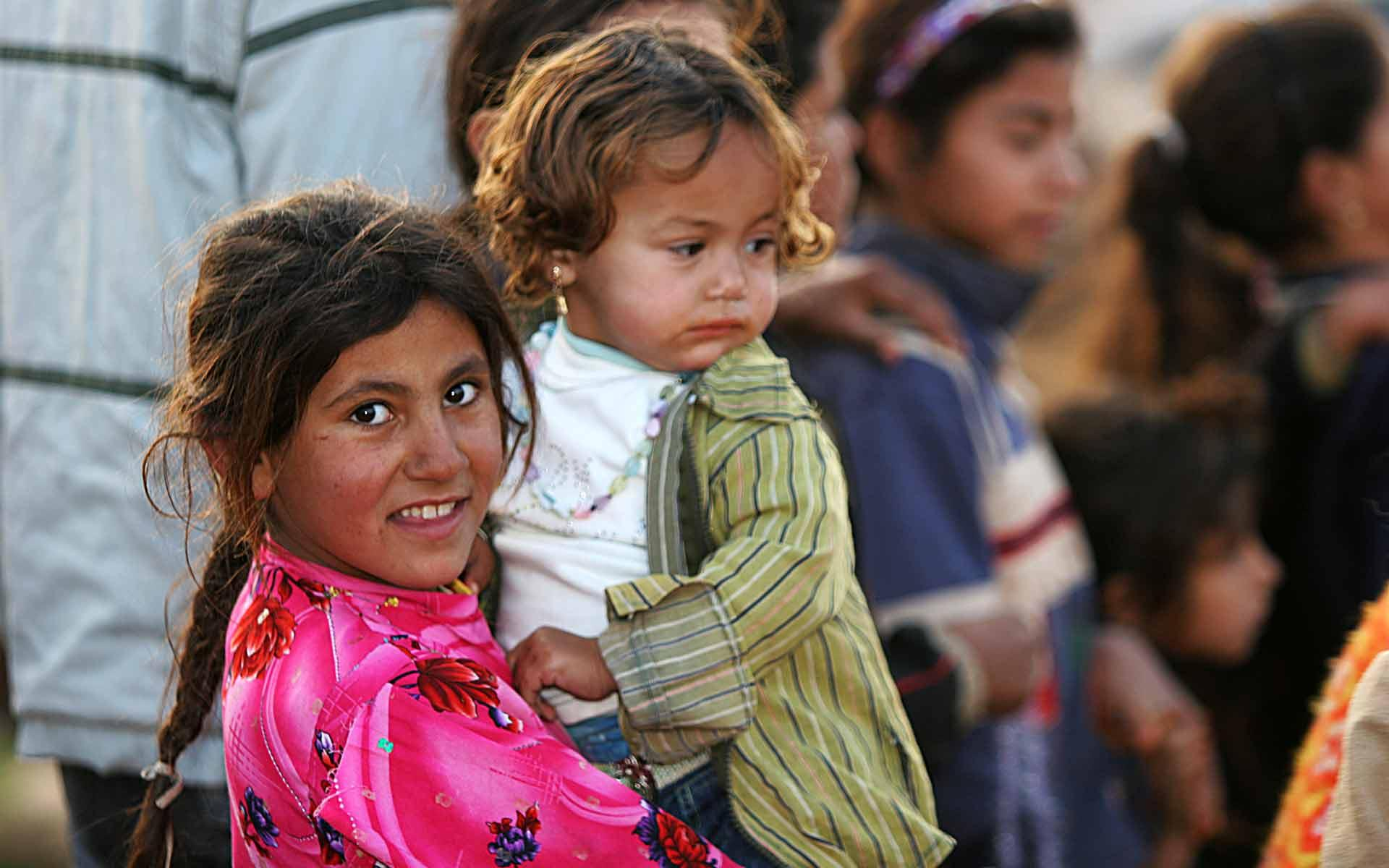
Iraqi refugees in Syria

Syria has historically offered assistance to Iraqi refugees. At the beginning of 2007, the UNHCR estimated that the number of Iraqi refugees in Syria was over 1.2 million. 80–90% of the Iraqi refugee population lives in the capital city of Damascus. The reason for its large refugee population can be attributed to more than just geography. Until 2007, Syria maintained an open-door policy to Iraqis fleeing the war-ravaged country.

Many Iraqis in Syria live in poverty, and an estimated 50,000 Iraqi girls and women, many of them widows, are forced into prostitution just to survive. According to the UNHCR, about 27% of Iraqi refugee families in Syria are without a breadwinner.

Early in the recent Iraq war, Iraqis in Syria were the politically threatened Baath party, including supporters of Hussein's government. But after the fighting began in Falluja in 2004, Shi'a were the main new entries to Syria. Before the restrictions were imposed, Iraqis seeking refuge in Syria received 3 month visas or permits with extension possibilities. However, the refugees are not entitled to work, but most do anyway due to lax enforcement on the part of the Syrian government. There were few sanctions for those who overstay and fail to renew.

Numbering over 1.2 million, Iraqi refugees comprise a large portion of Syria's population of 18 million. This has caused an increase in the cost of living and caused a strain on infrastructure. Sources like oil, heat, water and electricity were said to be becoming more scarce as demand had gone up. Syrian's deputy foreign minister has stated that the price of food has increased by 30%, property prices by 40%, and rentals by 150%. Water consumption rose by 21%, costing the Syrian government about 6.8 million US dollars in 2006. The Iraqi population also strained the labor market: Syrian unemployment was 18% in 2006. Refugees put a strain on health services (which are free in Syria), and Syria experienced public school overcrowding. In 2005 and 2006, Syria used $162 million to offer aid to Iraqi refugees in the country.

Syria once maintained an open border for Arab migrants, and entitled Iraqi refugees to Syrian health care and schools. The Syrian government accepted Iraqis as prima facie refugees. However, on October 1, 2007 news agencies reported that Syria re-imposed restrictions on Iraqi refugees, as stated by a spokesperson for the United Nations High Commissioner for Refugees. Under Syria's new rules, only Iraqi merchants, businessmen and university professors with visas acquired from Syrian embassies may enter Syria.

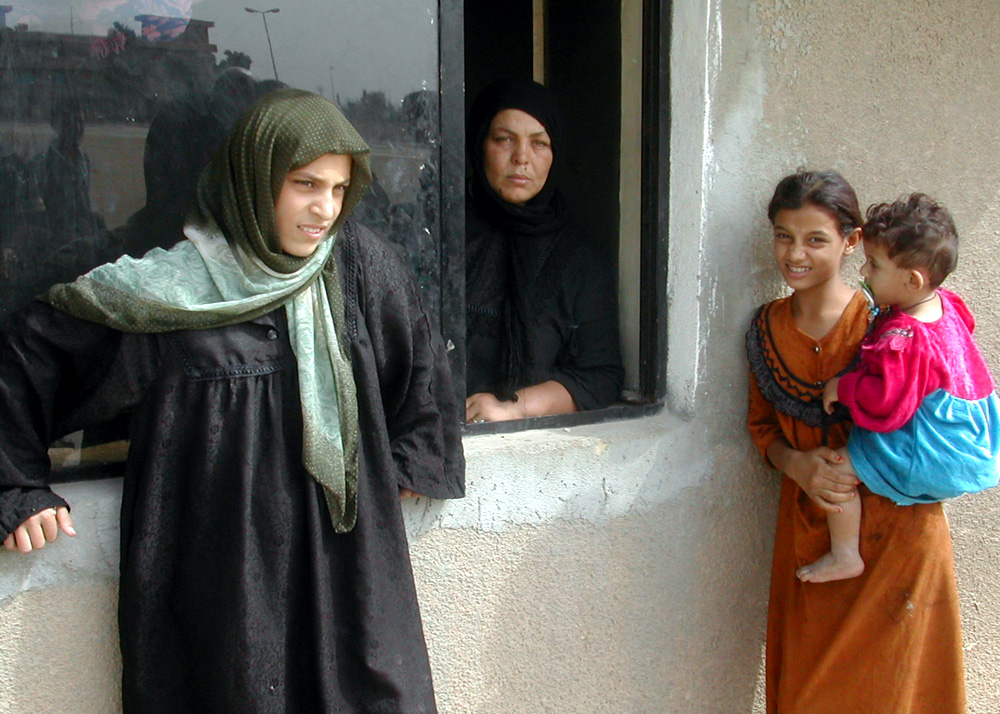
Iraqi Refugees, Damascus, Syria

==== Refugees flee Syrian civil war, and targeted executions ====
In 2012–13, as a Syrian civil war intensified, many Iraqi refugees fled the rising violence. Fewer than 200,000 Iraqis remained in Syria in 2012, according to the office of the Iraqi ambassador in Damascus. Many of the Iraqis were helped to return to Iraq by the provision of free flights and bus tickets, paid for by the Iraqi government. Tens of thousands of Iraqi families traveled back to their original country, although Iraq is itself unstable, and sectarian bomb attacks occur there almost daily.

The majority of Iraqis fleeing back from Syria in 2012 were Shia according to a spokesman for the Iraqi Ministry of Displacement and Migration. The UN refugee agency said Iraqis in the mainly Shia Damascus suburb of Sayeda Zeinab were fleeing not only increasing violence but "targeted threats" against them. In July 2012, the most intense fighting of the 17-month-old Syrian conflict began. Rebels took over whole neighborhoods of the Syrian capital, and government forces responded ferociously. Amid the fighting, it appears rebel fighters specifically targeted Iraqis. According to the UN, an Iraqi family of seven was killed at gunpoint in their Damascus apartment. 23 Iraqi refugees were reported killed in July, some by beheaded, according to the Washington-based Shiite Rights Watch. The attacks reflect the sectarian nature of Syria's war, In which opposition mostly from the country's Sunni majority has risen up against the government of Syrian President Assad. Motives for attacks against Iraqi refugees are unclear, but may be due to antagonism towards Shia generally, because of their sectarian association with the government, or because Iraq's Shiite-led government is perceived as siding with Assad. Though Baghdad has publicly vowed not to become involved with Syria's war, skeptics believe it is at least helping Iran ship weapons and reinforcements to Assad's government. In March, the US urged Baghdad to cut off its airspace to flights headed to Syria from Iran, and Iraqi Prime Minister Nouri al-Maliki pledged to curb arms smuggling across his borders into Syria.

=== Lebanon ===
Many Shi'a Iraqis fleeing Saddam Hussein in the 1990s moved to Lebanon. A 2007 article by the journal Middle East Report reported that Lebanon hosted around 40,000 Iraqi refugees. About 80% of Iraqi refugees live in Lebanon's capital of Beirut, contrary to many other Middle Eastern countries where Iraqi refugees are entirely concentrated in an urban center. Lebanon has instituted a policy of non-refoulement. Refugees living in Lebanon cannot be forcibly deported if their lives will be in danger in their home countries. Like in other Middle Eastern host countries, Iraqi refugees in Lebanon face the negative effects of unemployment and poverty as they cannot obtain work visas.

=== Egypt ===
Egypt, which does not border Iraq, became a major destination for Iraqi refugees in 2006. Iraqi refugees entered Egypt extremely quickly. Only 800 refugees were in Egypt in 2003, but by 2006, there were almost 150,000 Iraqis in Egypt. In 2007, Egypt imposed restrictions on the entry of new refugees into the country.

=== Sweden ===
Sweden has seen surges of refugees from Iraq, especially in 2001 - 2002, 2006 - 2007 and in 2015. Sweden has accepted more than half of all asylum applications from Iraqis in Europe. In 2006, close to 9,000 Iraqis fled their country and came to Sweden seeking shelter, a four times increase over 2005. The following year (2007) the number of Iraqi asylum seekers doubled, reaching more than 18,000. An estimated 146,400 Iraqis now call Sweden their home, and a further 58,900 persons have been born in Sweden and have two Iraqi parents. Many Iraqis fled to Sweden during the 90's as well. Current refugees like Sweden because many of their relatives are there and because of the generous refugee policies.

=== Other countries ===
Since 2006, Iraqis have been the leading nationality seeking asylum in industrialized countries. Increasing tensions in the Middle East and the treatment of Iraqi refugees as temporary guests in the Arab states has led to increased travel distance for Iraqi asylum seekers.

== Third country resettlement ==
In 2008, the UNHCR resettled 17,800 Iraqi refugees in third countries outside the Middle East.

=== United States ===
In early February 2007 the United States and the United Nations developed a plan to resettle several thousand refugees in the United States. In an initial step, refugees would apply for applicant status. The US aimed to settle at least 5,000 refugees in the US by the end of 2007. Kristele Younes of Refugees International supported these moves towards resettlement, but she said that "the numbers remain low compared to what the needs are." A July 22, 2007 article notes that in 2007 only 133 of the planned 7000 Iraqi refugees were allowed into the United States. Of the refugees' status, US Senator Edward M. Kennedy (Massachusetts) said, "We can’t solve the problem alone, but we obviously bear a heavy responsibility for the crisis."

Iraqi refugees looking to live in the United States must apply to the US Refugee Admission Program (USRAP). USRAP involves both governmental and non-governmental partners to resettle refugees in the United States. The US Department of State’s Bureau of Population, Refugees, and Migration (PRM) has overall management responsibility of USRAP. The Department of Homeland Security (DHS) and the US Citizenship and Immigration Services (USCIS) interview refugee applicants and review applications for refugee status. The PRM coordinates with the UNHCR for Iraqi refugee referrals.

The USRAP, UNHCR, and DHS prioritize refugees who are affiliated with the US government and religious minorities. Iraqis can be referred by the UNHCR, a US embassy, some NGOs, the US government, a US contractor, a US media organization, eligible family members in the US, and the US military. USCIS officers interview Iraqi refugees in Jordan, Egypt, Turkey, Lebanon, and Iraq, and have not been able to work in Syria since March 2011. Applicants to the USRAP must fall under the US's legal definition of "refugee", having "suffered past persecution or [have] a well founded fear of future persecution on the basis of race, religion, nationality, membership in a particular social group, or political opinion in his or her home country". Iraqis in the US may apply for asylum with the USCIS if they cannot return to Iraq because they have been "persecuted or fear that they will be persecuted on account of their race, religion, nationality, membership in a particular social group, or political opinion". Since 2007, 203,321 Iraqi nationals have been referred, the USCIS interviewed 142,670 applicants, approved 119,202 for resettlement, and 84,902 have arrived in the US, a tiny fraction of those who wish to apply. Refugees in America are usually settled in small towns rather than big cities because they receive community support that helps them navigate their new life.

=== Other countries ===
The UN aims to register 135,000 to 200,000 to determine which people had fled persecution and would thus qualify for refugee status.

By 2007, Australia resettled almost 6,000 Iraqi refugees.

According to the List Project, led by Kirk W. Johnson, "Poland, which had approximately 2,500 troops at its peak, was scheduled to withdraw its forces from Iraq by October 2008. Building on the successful precedent set by Denmark and the eventual British airlift, the Polish government offered all of their Iraqi employees either full resettlement or a one-time payment of $40,000 if they remained in Iraq."

== Minorities ==
=== Kurds ===
Among Iraqi refugees in Germany, about 50 percent are Kurds. In the UK, about 65-70% of people originating from Iraq are Kurdish, and 70% of those from Turkey and 15% of those from Iran are Kurds.

=== Assyrians/Christians ===
Perhaps as many as half a million Assyrians and Armenians are thought to have fled the sectarian fighting in Iraq, with Christians bearing the brunt of animosity toward a perceived "crusade" by the United States in Iraq. Most chose to go to Syria due to the cultural similarities between the two countries, Syria's open-door policy to Iraqis, and the large population of Assyrians and other Christians in the country which perhaps totals as high as 2 million. The large influx of Iraqis may tip the demographic scale in a country with a diverse population. Although Christians represent less than 5% of the total Iraqi population, they made up 40% of the refugees now living elsewhere, according to U.N. High Commissioner for Refugees. Between October 2003 and March 2005 alone, 36% of 700,000 Iraqis who fled to Syria were Assyrians and other Christians, judging from a sample of those registering for asylum on political or religious grounds.

=== Mandaeans ===
Mandaeans are an ancient ethnoreligious group in southern Iraq. They are the last practicing gnostic sect in the Middle East. There are thought to have been about 40,000 Mandaeans in Iraq prior to the US-led invasion. As a non-Muslim group, they have been abused by sectarian militias. The vast majority of Baghdadi Mandaeans left Baghdad; many have fled to Syria, Jordan and elsewhere while Mandaean communities of southern Iraq are mostly secure. Mandaean diaspora organizations are reportedly focusing all their resources on evacuating all the remaining Mandaeans in Iraq.

=== Palestinians ===
A small Palestinian population of about 38,000 also faced pressure, with many living in the Baghdadi neighborhood of al-Baladiya.

Denied access by Syria, more than 350 Palestinians remained in "inhumane conditions" on the Syrian border until finally being allowed into the country. They face more uncertain conditions because most Palestinians do not hold Iraqi citizenship and consequently do not hold passports. The UNHCR appealed to Israel to allow this particular group of refugees admission into the occupied territories of Gaza and the West Bank. The agency said that from resettlement countries, only Canada and Syria had taken Palestinians from Iraq in the past.

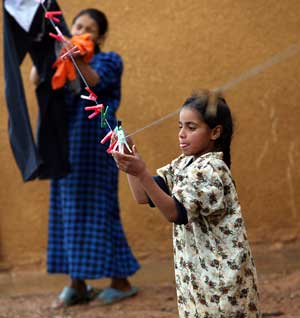
Palestinian Iraqi girl plays with a clothesline

=== Yazidis ===
The Yazidi community was affected by several acts of violence in 2007. On April 23, 2007 masked gunmen abducted and shot 23 Yazidis near Mosul. On August 14, 2007 Yazidis were targeted in a series of bombings that became the deadliest suicide attack since the Iraq War began.

== Challenges ==
Iraqi refugee populations face unique challenges, particularly since they are located in urban centers rather than in refugee camps. Access to public services like health care and education is very limited for refugees. In late 2007, less than 40% of Iraqi refugee children attended school. In many host countries, education is offered free of charge to all children, including refugees. However, the cost of books, uniforms, and a lack of inexpensive transportation prevents many Iraqi refugee children from actually attending school. There is little data available on the health status of Iraqi refugees, but limited reports indicate that they suffer worse health than that of their host populations. Psychological health care is especially crucial yet lacking, as many Iraqis suffer psychologically as a result of witnessing extreme violence. The current lack of health care contrasts greatly to the high-quality and accessible health services offered in Iraq before the 2003 invasion.

== International aid ==
On April 17, 2007 an international conference on the Iraqi refugee crisis began in Geneva, Switzerland. Attendees included Human Rights Watch representatives, US Undersecretary of State Paula Dobriansky, United Nations High Commissioner for Refugees representatives and members of 60 other Non-Governmental Organizations. The World Health Organization began a two-day conference in Damascus, Syria, on July 29, 2007. The conference addressed the health requirements of the more than two million refugees from Iraq. Aside from the WHO, participants in the conference included the International Committee of the Red Cross, the Red Crescent, and various UN agencies.

On September 18, 2007, the UNHCR, WHO, UNICEF, UNFPA, and WFP launched an appeal for $84.8 million to help host countries meet health and nutrition needs of Iraqi refugees. The funds support clinics, facilities, medicines, and medical supplies. In 2007, Jordan, Syria, Lebanon, Egypt, Turkey, UN agencies, and NGOs assisting Iraqi refugees received about $60 million to better provide for Iraqi refugee populations. $27 million was allocated to health care as part of the UN joint health appeal. As of 2007, the US has pledged $18 million and the European Union has pledged 50 million euros to assist Iraqi refugees.

== See also ==
- Arab diaspora
- Asylum in the United States
- Civil war in Iraq
- Ethnic cleansing
- Human rights in Iraq
- Human rights in the Middle East
- Human rights in post-invasion Iraq
- Iraqi diaspora
- Kurdish Cinema
- Refugees of the Syrian Civil War
- Religious war
- Sectarianism
- Urban refugee
