= NAV-BEL =

The Belgian Kurdistan Communities Democratic Council (Kurdish: Meclîsa Demokratîk a Civakên Kurdistanê ya Belçîkayê), commonly known as NAV-BEL, is a community-based organisation representing the Kurdish diaspora in Belgium. It is affiliated with the European Kurdish Democratic Societies Congress (KCDK-E) and acts as an umbrella organization for various Kurdish cultural, political, and social groups across Belgium.

== History and background ==
NAV-BEL was established to provide political and cultural representation for Kurds living in Belgium, particularly those displaced by conflict and political repression in Turkey, Syria, Iraq, and Iran. The organization is part of a broader movement that advocates for Kurdish rights and democratic self-determination across Europe.

The council's activities are inspired by the political philosophy of Abdullah Öcalan, the imprisoned founder of the Kurdistan Workers' Party (PKK), emphasising grassroots democracy, gender equality, and ecological sustainability.

== Objectives ==
NAV-BEL's main objectives include representing and organizing the Kurdish community in Belgium and promoting Kurdish language, culture, and identity. It is also committed to advocating for democratic rights and peace in Kurdistan, mobilizing political support for Kurdish causes in European institutions, and campaigning for the release of Abdullah Öcalan and political prisoners in Turkey.

== Activities ==
NAV-BEL regularly organises demonstrations, cultural events, and political campaigns. It is active in protesting alleged human rights violations by the Turkish government, supporting campaigns against the use of chemical weapons in Kurdish regions, participating in European-wide Kurdish demonstrations, such as those held in Düsseldorf, Brussels, and Strasbourg, and collaborating with women's organisations like the Kurdish Women's Movement in Europe (TJK-E).

== Notable events ==
On 11 November 2022, NAV-BEL called for mass participation in a demonstration in Düsseldorf to protest the alleged use of chemical weapons by Turkish forces against the Kurdistan Freedom Guerrillas. The organisation accused the international community of complicity through silence and urged broader recognition of Kurdish resistance.

In March 2025, NAV-BEL announced support for a joint declaration by KCDK-E and TJK-E affirming Abdullah Öcalan's proposals for peace and a democratic society in the Middle East.

== Affiliations ==
- European Kurdish Democratic Societies Congress (KCDK-E)
- Kurdish Women's Movement in Europe (TJK-E)
- Local Kurdish cultural and youth organizations in Belgium

== See also ==
- Kurds in Belgium
- Kurdish diaspora
- European Kurdish Democratic Societies Congress (KCDK-E)
