= Finland–Turkey relations =

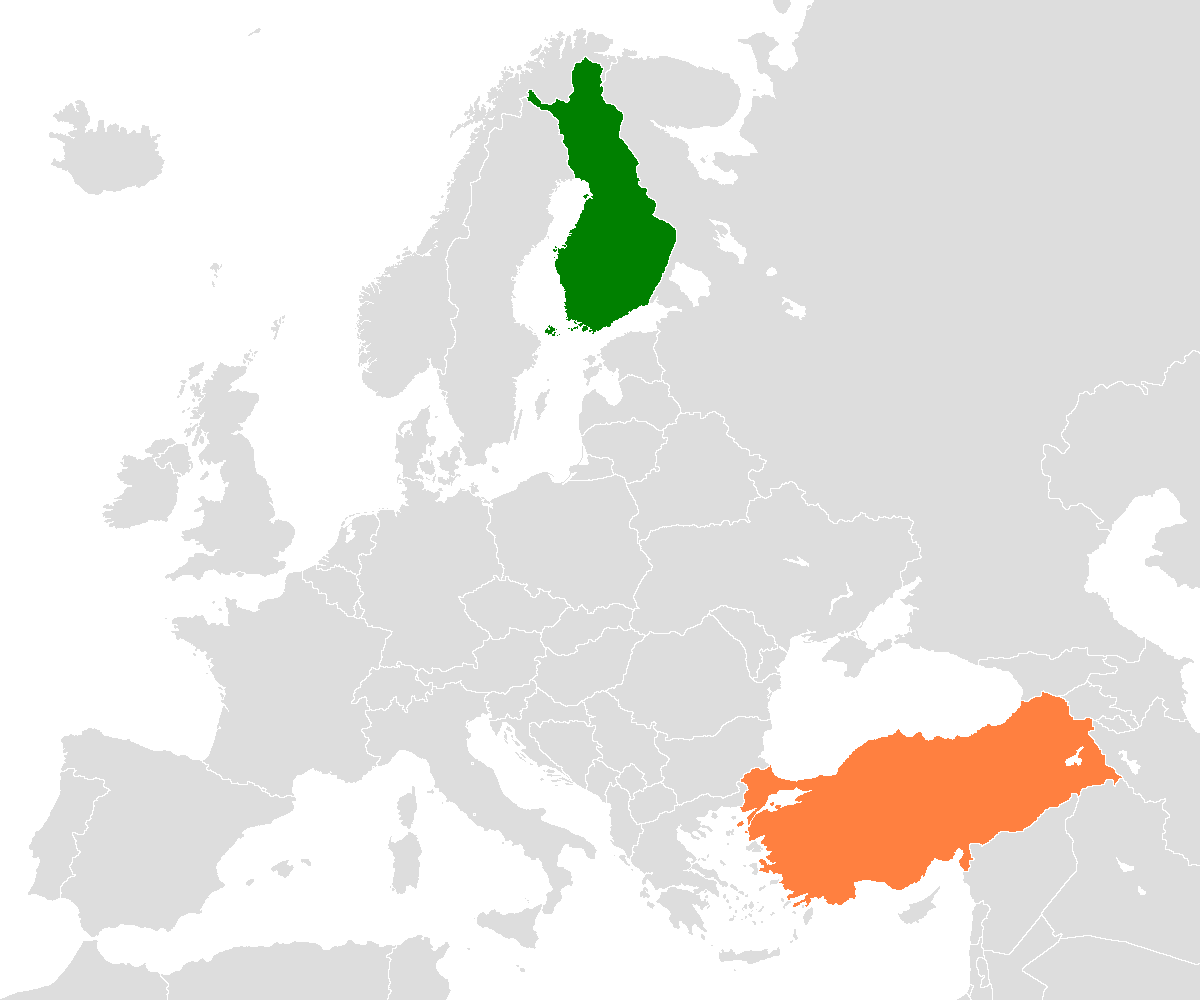
- Finland: Turkey

Diplomatic mission
- Embassy of Finland, Ankara: Embassy of Turkey, Helsinki

Finland–Turkey relations are foreign relations between Finland and Turkey. Finland has an embassy in Ankara and an honorary consulate general in Istanbul. Turkey has an embassy in Helsinki. Both countries are full members of the Council of Europe, the Organisation for Economic Co-operation and Development (OECD), the Organization for Security and Co-operation in Europe (OSCE), North Atlantic Treaty Organization (NATO), and the Union for the Mediterranean. Finland is an EU member and Turkey is an EU candidate. Finland supports Turkey's accession to the EU. Turkey did not support Finland's accession to NATO until March 2023, but accepted its participation.

== History ==
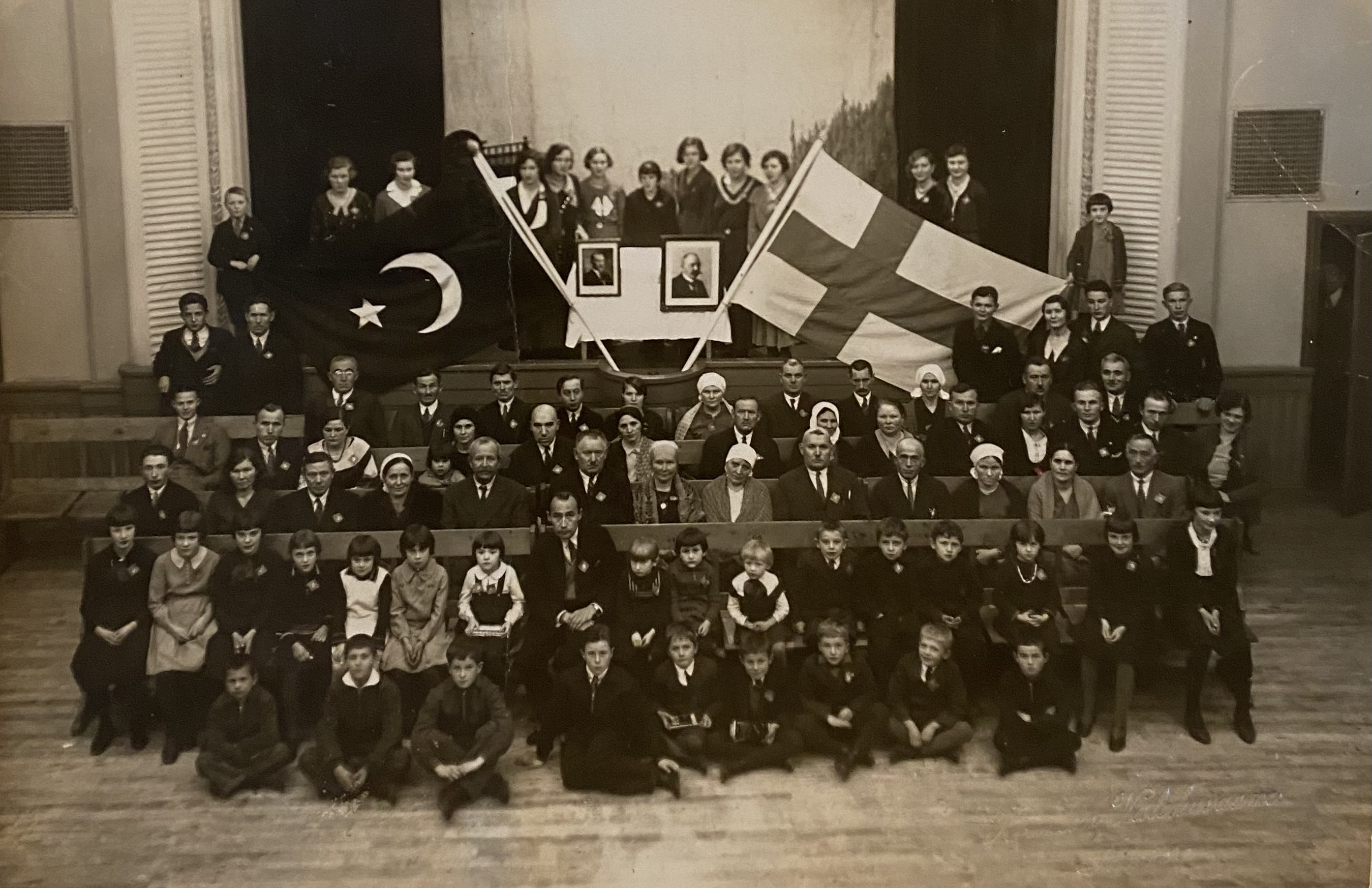
Finnish Tatars celebrating Turkey in Tampere, October 1933

The Ottoman Empire recognized the independence of Finland on February 21, 1918. Diplomatic relations between them were established on September 12, 1926. Relations between the two countries were described as being friendly though due to geographical separation, co-operation was limited. The first ambassador to Turkey was established in 1931 and an embassy in 1940. Finnish President at the time, Urho Kekkonen, made a state visit to Turkey in 1971, being the first Nordic head of state to visit Turkey in 250 years. Finnish tourism to Turkey increased in the 1980s, when destinations were established first to Marmara region and later to Alanya and Side. Finland was among the first countries to support Turkey's accession to the EU.

In 2008, the front door of the Turkish embassy in Helsinki was set on fire. The day prior to that, a Kurdish demonstration was staged by the embassy. Four young men of Turkish-Kurdish background were brought into custody. The Police stated it was politically motivated. Finland stopped selling weapons to Turkey in 2019 due to Turkey's military operation in Syria. In 2020, a Finnish citizen was arrested in Turkey, being suspected of having links to ISIS. Finland's Ministry for Foreign Affairs reported that it was aware of the arrest but refused to comment on it. In January 2023, Finland lifted its embargo on weapons exports to Turkey.

=== Osman Kavala dispute ===
In October 2021, in the wake of the appeal for the release of Turkish activist Osman Kavala signed by 10 western countries, Turkish president Recep Tayyip Erdoğan ordered his foreign minister to declare the Finnish ambassador persona non grata, alongside the other 9 ambassadors. Following a statement by the ambassadors, reiterating their compliance with Article 41 of the Vienna Convention on Diplomatic Relations regarding the diplomatic duty not to interfere in host states’ internal affairs, President Erdoğan decided to not expel the ambassadors.

In October 2021, Finnish Prime Minister Sanna Marin reacted sharply to Turkish President Recep Tayyip Erdoğan, who declared his country's ambassador deported. And Marin also asked Erdoğan to implement the European Court of Human Rights decisions and to respect the ECHR judgments.

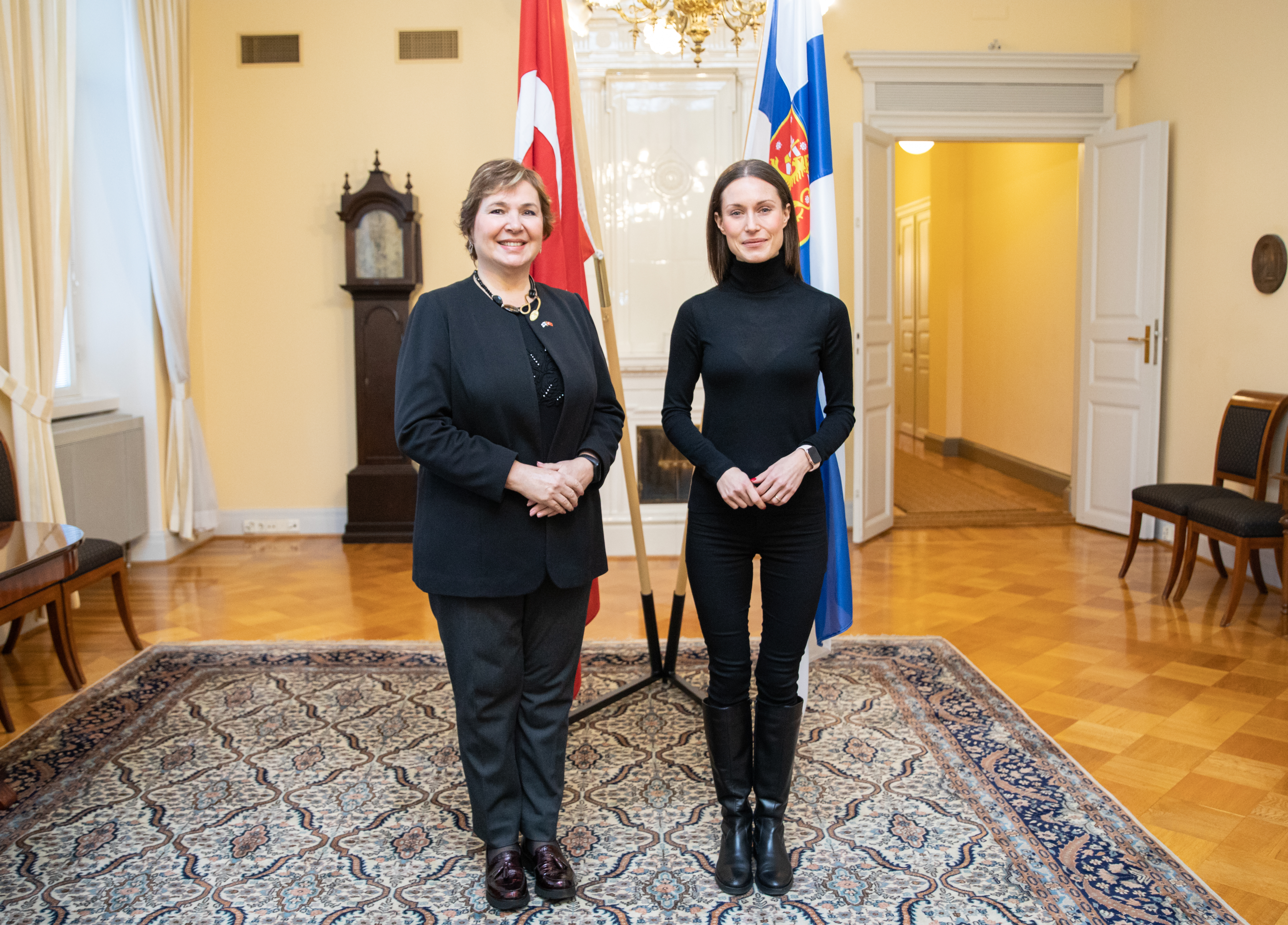
Prime Minister Sanna Marin and Turkish Ambassador Deniz Çakar met in Helsinki on 9 December 2022

=== Accession of Finland to NATO ===
In 2022, Turkey opposed Finland joining NATO because according to Turkey it hosts “terrorist organisations” which act against Turkey (including the PKK, PYD, YPG and Gülen movement). The Gülen movement is on the list of terrorist organizations in Turkey, but is not on the list of terrorist organizations in Finland and the PKK is on the list of terrorist organizations in both Turkey and Finland. In May 2022, Turkey quickly blocked the applications for NATO membership of Finland's from proceeding through an accelerated process. In May 2022, Turkey vetoed Finland's NATO membership. Turkey has demanded Finland and Sweden to extradite alleged terrorists linked to the Gülen movement and the Kurdish militant group PKK. By June 2022 Finland had received 10 extradition requests, of which two were handed to the Turkish authorities. There are around 16,000 Kurds in Finland, some of them being from Turkey. On 21 May 2022, Finnish President Sauli Niinistö, after a telephone conversation with Turkish President Recep Tayyip Erdoğan, announced that they were ready for dialogue with Turkey regarding Finland's membership in NATO and that they always condemned terrorism. Turkey asked Finland and Sweden not to support the Gülen movement and the PKK. Turkey asked Finland to stop and end the Kurdish demonstrations. Turkey asked Finland and Sweden not to support terrorism. Turkey asked Finland and Sweden to address Turkey's security concerns. On 28 June 2022, during a NATO summit in Madrid, Turkey agreed to support the membership bids of Finland and Sweden. In September 2022, Turkey requested the extradition of 6 Turkish citizens from Finland. However, Finland did not respond positively and refused. Turkey demanded that Finland end its support to the Gülen movement and the PKK. In December 2022, Finnish Defense Minister Antti Kaikkonen, in a statement after his meeting with his Turkish counterpart Hulusi Akar, announced that Finland was ready to address Turkey's security concerns and that they always condemned terrorism. In January 2023, President of the Turkish Grand National Assembly Mustafa Şentop cancelled the Finnish Parliament Speaker Matti Vanhanen's visit to Turkey. After Turkey's parliament approved Finland's application on 30 March 2023, Finland was set to become the 31st member of NATO. On 1 April 2023, Turkish President Recep Tayyip Erdoğan signed and approved the proposal containing Finland's accession protocol.

== Economic relations ==
Turkey is an important trading partner for Finland. Trade between the two countries totaled $1.3 billion in 2018. Turkey is among the most popular tourist destinations for Finns, with 230,000 Finns travelling to Turkey in 2015.

== Diaspora ==
As of 2023, there were 13,399 people in Finland of Turkish background, of which 10,555 were born in Turkey and 2,844 in Finland. Around 2,000 Finns live in the Alanya region alone.

== European Union ==
Finland joined the EU in 1995. Turkey is still a candidate country for the EU, and membership negotiations have been effectively frozen since 2016. Finland fully supports Turkey's EU membership process, as it has effectively frozen membership negotiations.

== NATO ==
Turkey joined NATO in 1952. Finland joined NATO in 2023.

== State visits ==
Guest	Host	Place of visit	Date of visit
(Finland) President Urho Kekkonen	(Turkey) President Cevdet Sunay	Ankara, Turkey	7-12 June 1971
(Turkey) President Fahri Korutürk	(Finland) President Urho Kekkonen	Helsinki, Finland	12-15 April 1977
(Finland) President Martti Ahtisaari	(Turkey) President Süleyman Demirel	Ankara, Turkey	20 November 1999
(Turkey) President Abdullah Gül	(Finland) President Tarja Halonen	Helsinki, Finland	7–9 October 2008
(Finland) Prime Minister Matti Vanhanen	(Turkey) Prime Minister Recep Tayyip Erdoğan	Istanbul, Turkey	6 October 2009
(Turkey) Prime Minister Recep Tayyip Erdoğan	(Finland) Prime Minister Mari Kiviniemi	Helsinki, Finland	19–20 October 2010
(Finland) President Tarja Halonen	(Turkey) President Abdullah Gül	Ankara, and Şanlıurfa, Turkey	29–30 March 2011
(Turkey) Prime Minister Recep Tayyip Erdoğan	(Finland) Prime Minister Jyrki Katainen	Helsinki, Finland	5–6 November 2013
(Finland) President Sauli Niinistö	(Turkey) President Recep Tayyip Erdoğan	Ankara, and Istanbul, Turkey	12–15 October 2015
(Turkey) Prime Minister Ahmet Davutoğlu	(Finland) Prime Minister Juha Sipilä	Helsinki, Finland	6 April 2016
(Finland) President Sauli Niinistö	(Turkey) President Recep Tayyip Erdoğan	Ankara, and Kahramanmaraş, Turkey	16–17 March 2023
(Finland) President Alexander Stubb	(Turkey) President Recep Tayyip Erdoğan	Ankara, Turkey	1 October 2024

== Resident diplomatic missions ==
- Finland has an embassy in Ankara.
- Turkey has an embassy in Helsinki.
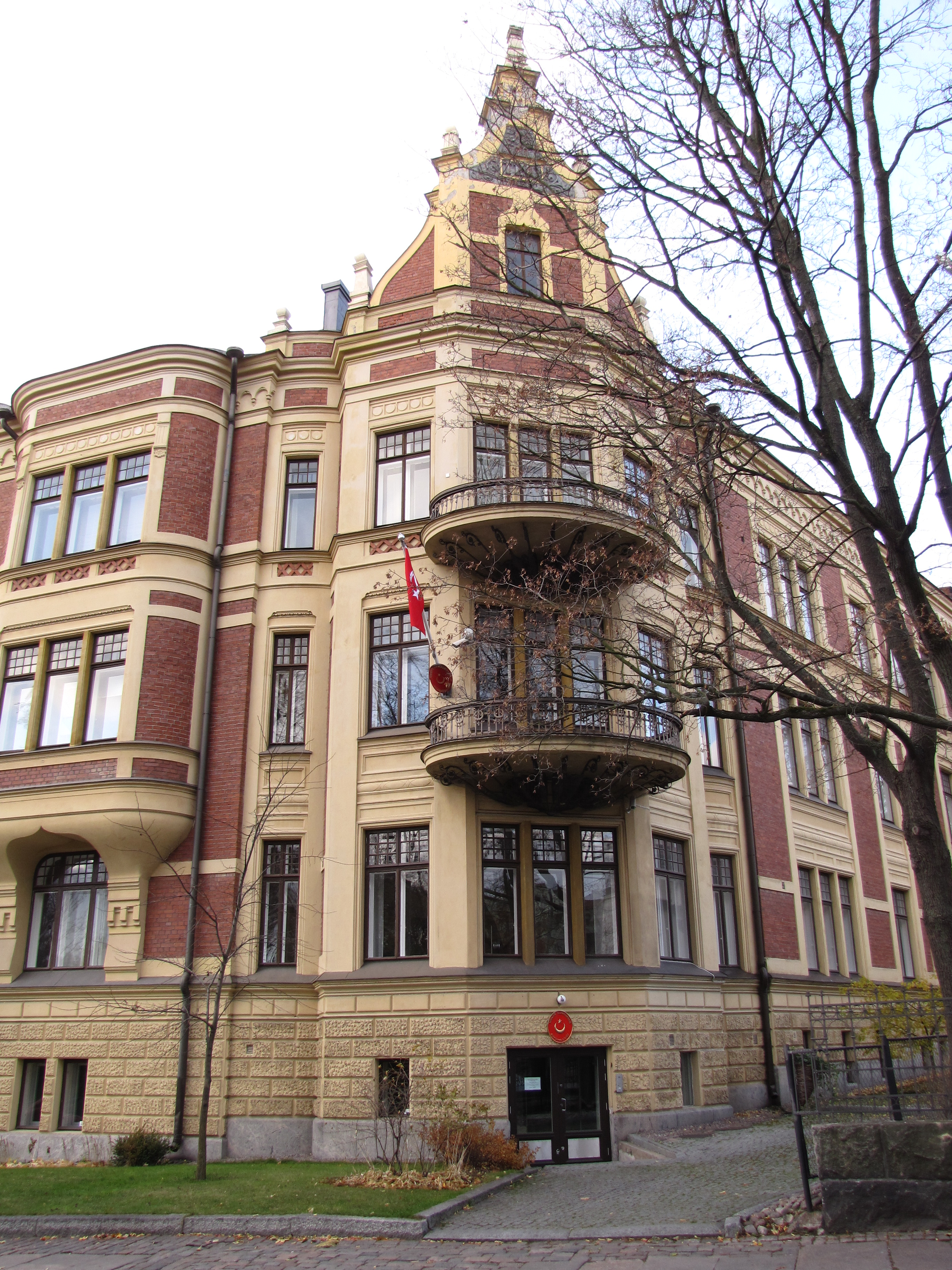
Embassy of Turkey in Helsinki

== See also ==
- Foreign relations of Finland
- Foreign relations of Turkey
- Finland–NATO relations
- Turkey–European Union relations
- List of ambassadors of Turkey to Finland
- Turks in Finland
