= List of ambassadors of Turkey to Finland =

The list of ambassadors of Turkey to Finland provides a chronological record of individuals who have served as the diplomatic representatives of the Republic of Turkey to the Republic of Finland.

== History ==
The Treaty of Friendship, which established political relations between the Republic of Turkey and the Republic of Finland, was formally ratified on 9 December 1924 and took effect in 1926. During the period of 1946 to 1959, Turkey maintained a diplomatic presence in Finland through the rank of chargé d'affaires and minister plenipotentiary. In 1959, the representation was elevated to the status of an embassy.

Presently, the Turkish embassy is situated in the charming and historically significant district of Ullanlinna, which is conveniently located near the renowned Kaivopuisto Park and a mere 10-minute walk from the city center. Since 1992, the Turkish embassy has been operating from its current chancery building in Helsinki. The consular section of the embassy is housed on the first floor of the same building. Additionally, the office of the military attaché is located within the chancery, while the office of the culture and promotion counsellor and the office of the trade counsellor operate from different addresses.

The building that houses the Turkish embassy holds historical significance, dating back to the year 1900. Both the exterior facade and interior decorations of the chancery have been preserved in their original form, showcasing the rich heritage of the building.

== List of ambassadors ==
Ambassador	Term start	Term end	Ref.
Kemal Nejat Kavur	1 January 1946	1 January 1952	
Tarık Emin Yenisey	1 January 1952	1 January 1957	
Abdullah Zeki Polar	1 January 1957	1 January 1961	
Ziya Tepedelen	1 January 1961	1 January 1964	
Osman Olcay	1 January 1964	1 January 1967	
Mehmet İrfan Karasar	1 January 1967	1 January 1971	
Hamit Batu	1 January 1971	1 January 1974	
Kamran Acet	1 January 1974	1 January 1976	
Candemir Önhon	1 January 1979	1 January 1982	
Yalçın Kurtbay	1 January 1979	1 January 1982	
Metin Karaca	1 January 1982	1 January 1984	
Oktay Aksoy	1 January 1986	1 January 1989	
Doğan Türkmen	1 January 1986	1 January 1989	
Tuncer Topur	1 January 1989	1 January 1995	
Akın Alptuna	1 January 1995	1 January 1997	
Onur Gökçe	1 January 1997	1 January 2001	
İlhan Yiğitbaşıoğlu	1 January 2001	1 January 2004	
Osman Paksüt	1 January 2004	1 January 2005	
Reha Keskintepe	1 January 2005	1 January 2009	
Hüseyin Selah Korutürk	15 November 2009	3 January 2014	
Adnan Başağa	27 November 2013	15 March 2018	
Mehmet Vakur Erkul	30 July 2018	1 September 2022	
Deniz Çakar	1 September 2022	Present	

== See also ==
- Finland–Turkey relations
- Embassy of Turkey in Helsinki
