= Kurds in Denmark =

Kurdish people in Denmark

Total population
- 25,000 (2016 Kurdish Institute of Paris estimate) - 30,000

Languages
- Danish, Kurdish

Religion
- Sunni Islam

Related ethnic groups
- Kurds in Finland, Kurds in Norway; Kurds in Sweden

Kurds in Denmark are Kurds living in Denmark. The number of Kurds is estimated between 25,000 and 30,000 and they come mainly from countries in the Middle East. Most Danish Kurds live in the capital Copenhagen.

In 1993, population of Kurds in Denmark was estimated as 12,000 by Kurdish Institute of Paris (KIP). Today, KIP estimates the same number as 25,000.

In 2017, the fiftieth anniversary of the arrival of the first Kurds in Denmark was celebrated with aspects of Kurdish culture.

== See also ==
- Kurdish diaspora
- Immigration to Denmark
- Kurds in Finland
- Kurds in Norway
- Kurds in Sweden
