= Kurds in Italy =

Kurdish people in Italy

Kurds in Italy Curdi in Italia Kurdên li Îtalyayê
Total population
- 25,000 (2016 KIP estimate) - 25,000 (2023 KIP estimate)

Regions with significant populations
- Rome, Milan

Languages
- Italian, Kurdish

Religion
- Islam

Related ethnic groups
- Kurdish diaspora, Kurds in France; Kurds in Switzerland

Kurds in Italy (Italian: Curdi in Italia; Kurdish: Kurdên li Îtalyayê) are Kurds living in Italy. The number of Kurds is estimated between 25,000 and they come mainly from countries in the Middle East. Most Italian Kurds live in the capital Rome or in Milan.

In 2016, population of Kurds in Italy was estimated as 25,000 by Kurdish Institute of Paris (KIP). Today, KIP estimates the same number as 25,000.

== Political activism ==
In October 2019, thousands of Italian Kurds staged a protest in Rome and Milan over Turkey's military operation in northeastern Syria.

== See also ==
- Kurdish diaspora
- Immigration to Italy
- Kurds in France
- Kurds in Switzerland
