= Kurds in Norway =

Ethnic group

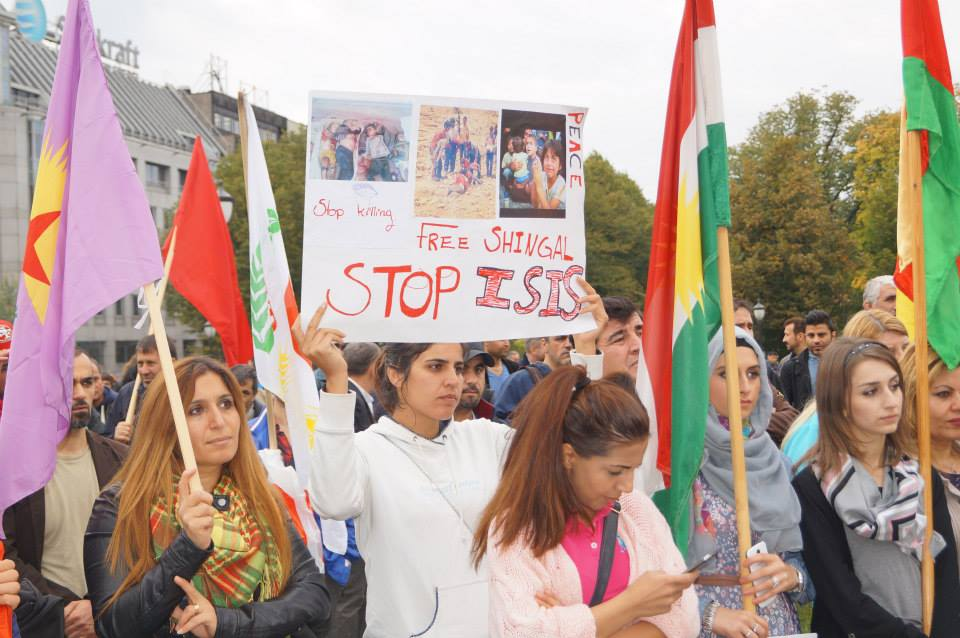
- Kurdish demonstration against ISIS in Norway, 12 May 2016

Total population
- 7,100 (2013 official estimate of Kurdish speakers)-25,000 (2016 Kurdish Institute of Paris estimate)

Regions with significant populations
- Oslo

Languages
- Norwegian, Kurdish

Related ethnic groups
- Kurdish diaspora

Kurds in Norway are Kurds living in Norway. The number of Kurds is estimated between 7,100 and 25,000 and they come mainly from countries in the Middle East. Most Norwegian Kurds live in the capital Oslo. In 1993, population of Kurds in Norway was estimated as 2,000 by Kurdish Institute of Paris (KIP). In 2021, citing a report of the KIP, Rudaw estimates that between 25,000 and 30,000 Kurds reside in Norway.

== Political representation ==
In the 2021 Norwegian parliamentary election, two Kurdish-Norwegians were elected being Seher Aydar of the Red Party and the other Mani Hussaini from the Labour Party.

== Notable people ==
- Seher Aydar
- Mariwan Halabjaee
- Zaniar Matapour

== See also ==
- Kurdish diaspora
  - Kurds in Denmark
  - Kurds in Finland
  - Kurds in Sweden
- Immigration to Norway
