= Embassy of Turkey, Helsinki =

Turkish embassy in Finland

Ambassador of Turkey to Finland
- Emblem of the Turkish Embassy in Helsinki
- Incumbent; Deniz Çakar
- Ministry of Foreign Affairs
- Style: Her Excellency
- Reports to: Minister of Foreign Affairs
- Seat: Helsinki
- Appointer: President of Turkey
- Term length: At the pleasure of the president
- Website: http://helsinki.be.mfa.gov.tr/

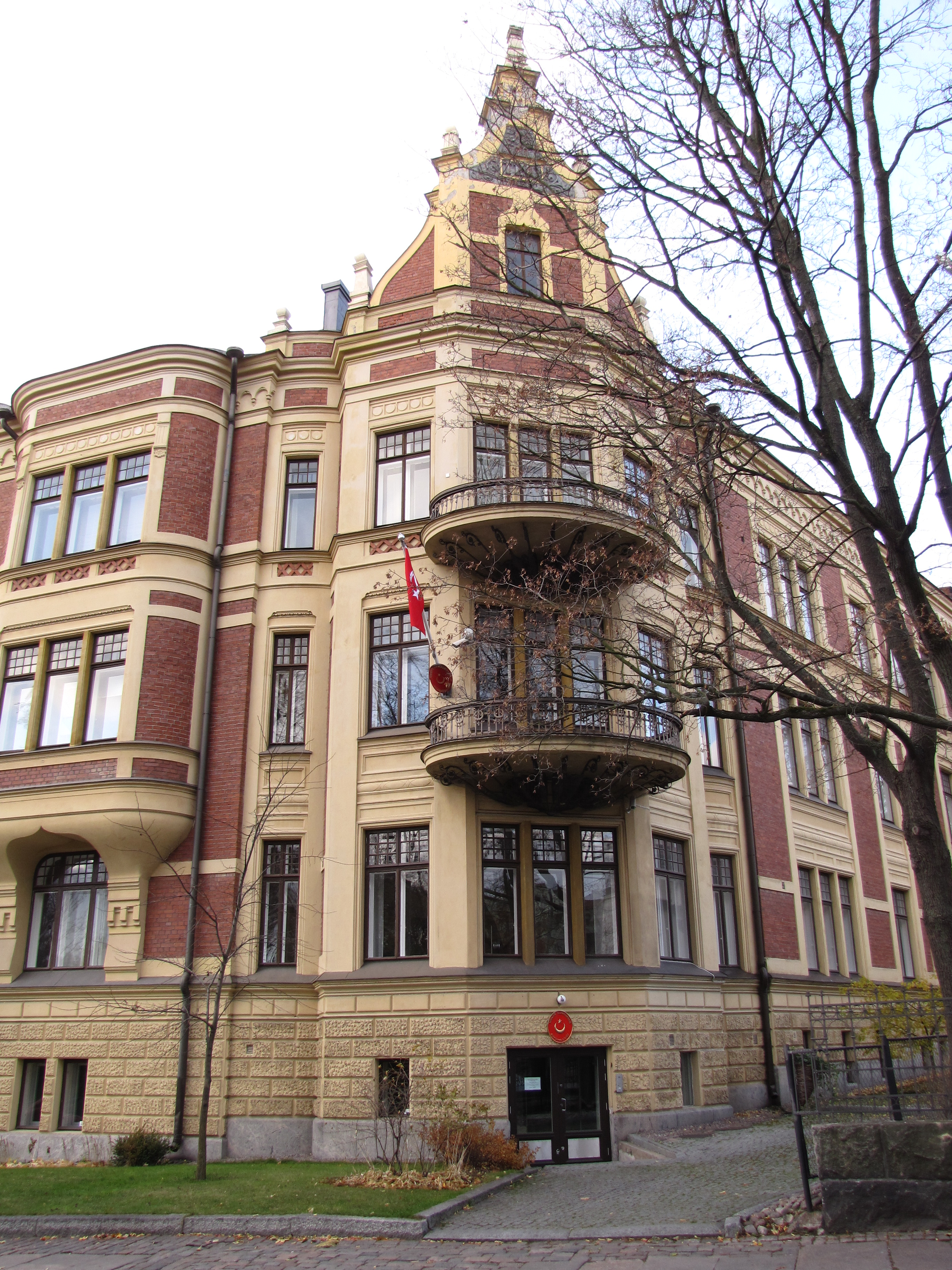
Turkish Embassy in Helsinki, Finland

The Embassy of Turkey in Helsinki (Turkish: Türkiye'nin Helsinki Büyükelçiliği) is the diplomatic mission of Turkey to Finland.

== History ==
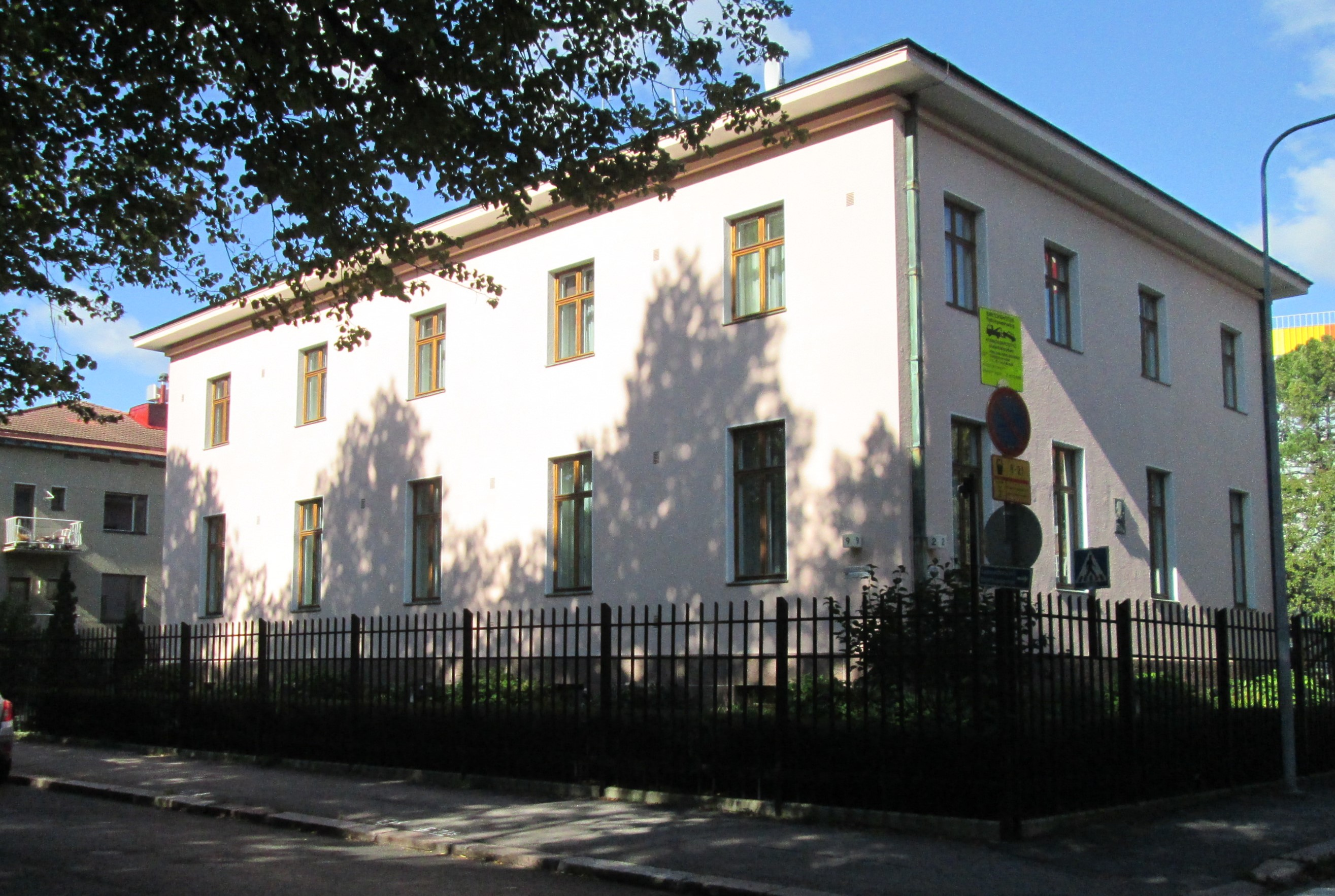
Official residence of the Turkish ambassador

Between 1946 and 1959, Turkey was represented in Finland at the levels of Charge d'affaires and Minister Plenipotentiary. In 1959, the representation was promoted to the level of the Embassy. The Turkish Embassy is housed in a historic building that dates back to 1900.

Although relations between Finland and Turkey deepened rapidly after the conclusion of the Turkish War of Independence in 1923, this development was cut short by World War Two before diplomatic missions had been established. During this period, Turkey was represented by its envoy in Stockholm and Finland through its envoy in Bukarest, Rome, or Budapest on a rotational basis. The Legation of Finland in Ankara was opened in 1940 and the Turkish one in Helsinki in 1946.

The legation, and later embassy, has always been based in Puistokatu 1, although its chancellery moved first to Tehtaankatu in 1958 and later to Topeliuksenkatu to return to its original location in 1992.

In 1974, the embassy purchased the former residence of Finnish president Juho Kusti Paasikivi in Taka-Töölö to serve as the official residence of the ambassador. The building also houses the embassy's official premises for public functions on its lower floor, but these have largely been proven to be small for large-scale events. The house was designed by Paasikivi's daughter, Annikki, and built in 1930. The street it is located on was originally called Espoonkatu but later renamed Paasikivenkatu after the president. The embassy has mostly preserved its original late neoclassical style but with some added Turkish elements.

Occasionally tensions in Turkish domestic politics have spilled over to the embassy, namely in terms of the Kurdish question. The Turkish embassy in Helsinki was set on fire in 2008. The embassy had staged a Kurdish demonstration the day before. Four young men of Turkish-Kurdish origin were detained. In the immediate aftermath, the police suspected that the fire was started political reasons.

Since Finnish–Turkish relations are dominated by tourism, various NGOs have been set up to foster relations. The embassy cooperates with them as well as organizes exhibitions, workshops, and lectures of its own. The embassy also has a commercial section as well as a military attaché. On 1 March 2023, Kurds living in Finland burned a poster of Turkish President Recep Tayyip Erdoğan in front of the Turkish Embassy and the police launched an investigation into the incident.

== See also ==
- Finland–Turkey relations
