= Kurds in Switzerland =

Kurdish people in Switzerland

Total population
- 200,000 – 250,000

Languages
- German, French, Italian, Kurdish

Religion
- Islam

Related ethnic groups
- Kurdish diaspora

Kurds in Switzerland are residents in Switzerland of full or partial Kurds origin. The Kurds in Switzerland mainly reside in the Cantons of Zurich, Aargau and Basel-Stadt and are descendants of migrants of refugees from the regions around Pazarcık, Kahraranmaraş or Erzincan. There are also shia kurdish migrants from Iranian Kurdistan, the region around Ilam and Kermanshah along with Feyli Kurds from Baghdad who mainly reside Geneva and Zürich.

== Population ==
In 2012 the Swiss authorities estimated that about 110,000 and in 2015, that ca. 150,000 Kurdish speakers were living in Switzerland. Its centre is the region around Basel, where in 2010 it was assumed that 100,000 Kurds reside.

== Political representation ==
=== Basel ===
There are several politicians of Kurdish origin in Switzerland. From Canton Basel-Stadt, two members of the National Council, (the lower chamber of the Swiss Parliament), Mustafa Atici from the Social Democratic Party (SP) and Sibel Arslan from the party Basta! are of Kurdish origin. In the Grand Council of Basel-Stadt five members are of Kurdish origin. Bülent Pekerman presides over the Grand Council since February 2023. During the Turkish invasion of Afrin, Syria the Grand Council of Basel-Stadt issued a resolution in strong terms, demanding the diplomatic intervention by Switzerland who is the depository of the Geneva Convention and the host of the European seat of the United Nations.

=== Berne ===
Hasim Sancar is a member of the Grand Council of Berne.

=== Political activism ===
If the Kurds rights are violated like during the suppression by the Turkish authorities of the hunger strikes in Turkish prisons in December 2000 or the Turkish invasion into North East Syria in 2019 there are often organized manifestations in support of the Kurds.

In January 2026, thousands of Kurds in Switzerland demonstrated against the Syrian transitional government’s offensive targeting Kurdish-controlled regions in northeastern Syria.

== Organizations ==
=== Dem-Kurd ===
Dem-Kurd is an organization that provides with an education in Kurdish cultural heritage which in their country of origin they are often not able to access. Dem Kurd is organized into several commissions concerning to media, language, music and women.

=== Kurdish Red Crescent ===
The Swiss branch the Kurdish Red Crescent has its seat in Lausanne, at the shores of Lake Geneva.

== In popular culture ==
The movie Journey of Hope by Xavier Koller has portrayed the flight of a Kurdish family into Switzerland and was awarded an Oscar in 1991. Notable Swiss of Kurdish decent includes former professional footballer Eren Derdiyok, professional mixed martial artist and former kickboxer Volkan Oezdemir and Swiss businessman and politician Mustafa Atici.

== Notable people ==
- Dadvan Yousuf

== See also ==
- Kurdish diaspora
- Immigration to Switzerland
- Kurds in France
- Kurds in Germany
- Kurds in Italy
