= Kurds in Belgium =

Kurdish people in Belgium

Total population
- 70,000 (2016 Kurdish Institute of Paris estimate)

Regions with significant populations
- Brussels

Languages
- Dutch, French and Kurdish

Religion
- Islam, Yazidism, Christianity, Zoroastrianism

Related ethnic groups
- Other Kurds, Belgian Turks

Kurds in Belgium are Kurds living in Belgium. The number of Kurds is estimated between 7,100 and 25,000. Most Belgian Kurds live in the capital Brussels.

In 1993, population of Kurds in Belgium was estimated as 12,000 by Kurdish Institute of Paris (KIP). Today, KIP estimates the same number as 70,000. Almost all Kurds in Belgium are Muslim.

The Kurdish Institute of Brussels was founded by a group of Belgian Kurds in 1978 with the goal of integration of the Kurdish community in the Belgian society. The community is also represented by the Belgian Kurdistan Communities Democratic Council.

== Notable people ==
- Zuhal Demir, politician
- Ferhat Kaya, professional footballer

== See also ==
- Kurdish diaspora
- Immigration to Belgium
  - Kurds in France
  - Kurds in Germany
  - Kurds in the Netherlands
  - Kurds in the United Kingdom
- Kurdish Institute of Brussels
- Belgium–Kurdistan Region relations
