= Kurds in France =

Ethnic group

Regions with significant populations
- 150,000–240,000

Languages
- Kurdish; French; Turkish

Religion
- Sunni Islam, Shia Islam, Alevism and Yazidism

Related ethnic groups
- Other Kurds • Turks in France

Kurds in France may refer to people born in or residing in France of full or partial Kurds origin.

There is a large Kurdish community in France, with different estimates setting the number at around 150,000–240,000 people. This makes the Kurdish community in France the second largest Kurdish community in the Kurdish diaspora, after Kurds in Germany.

== Immigration history ==
In France, Kurdish immigrant workers from Turkey first arrived in the second half of the 1960s. Thousands of political Kurdish refugees fled from Turkey during the 1970s and onward, from Iraq and Iran during the 1980s and 1990s, and from Syria during the Syrian Civil War.

== Political activism ==
In October 2014, Kurds in France and other European countries marched in protest at what they perceived as Turkish collaboration with the Islamic State of Iraq and the Levant during the Siege of Kobani.

On 25 July 2015, Kurds marched in Paris to protest Turkish airstrikes in Iraqi Kurdistan on Kurdistan Workers Party (PKK) positions.

On 12 October 2019, thousands of Kurds in France marched to protest the 2019 Turkish offensive into north-eastern Syria.

On 23 December 2022, Kurdish protests responding to the mass shooting of Kurds in Paris turned into violent demonstrations. The indifferent attitude of the French police in providing security to the Kurdish minority paved the way for clashes between members of Kurdish community and French police.

== Notable people ==
Category:French people of Kurdish descent

- Ahmet Kaya, Turkish–Kurdish folk singer
- Amira Casar, French-British film actress
- Rima Hassan, Politician
- Ahmad Allée, Footballer
- Zana Allée, Footballer
- Huner Saleem, Film director
- Şeyhmus Dağtekin, Kurdish poet
- Yilmaz Guney, Kurdish film director, screenwriter, novelist, actor and communist political activist

== See also ==
- Kurdish population
  - Kurds in Belgium
  - Kurds in Germany
  - Kurds in Italy
  - Kurds in Switzerland
  - Kurds in the United Kingdom
- Immigration to France
- Kurdish Institute of Paris
- France–Kurdistan Region relations
