= Kurdish Mafia =

- Founded: 2019
- Founder: Milan Jaff
- Founding location: East Helsinki
- Territory: Helsinki metropolitan area
- Rivals: L-City

Kurdish Mafia, also sometimes called 47Kurdish Mafia or just 47, is a street gang founded and based in Finland in 2019. Members of Kurdish Mafia have been in the news for crimes, such as attempted murder, rape, and assault. Rapper Milan Jaff is usually seen as the leader of Kurdish Mafia, although he claims that 47Kurdish Mafia isn't a gang, but instead a brand and a music project. The gang was originally in 2022 seen as an organised crime group by the Helsinki District Court, but was later in 2024 changed to not be an organised crime group.

One of the notable rivals of Kurdish Mafia is a street gang called L-City. The two gangs hatred for each other started when a member of L-City, a rapper named Kerza, stabbed Ardar Husein, who has been described as a key member of Kurdish Mafia, in fall of 2021. In retaliation, Milan Jaff along with Yahye Mahdi Mohamud, also known as Cavallini, planned an attack on the Kaivohuone restaurant, where a known member of L-City was going to perform. The event was eventually cancelled, when the police found out about the plan. Jaff's car was subsequently searched and the officers found knives, and other bladed weapons in the trunk of Jaff's Cadillac.
