= Seher Aydar =

Norwegian politician (born 1989)

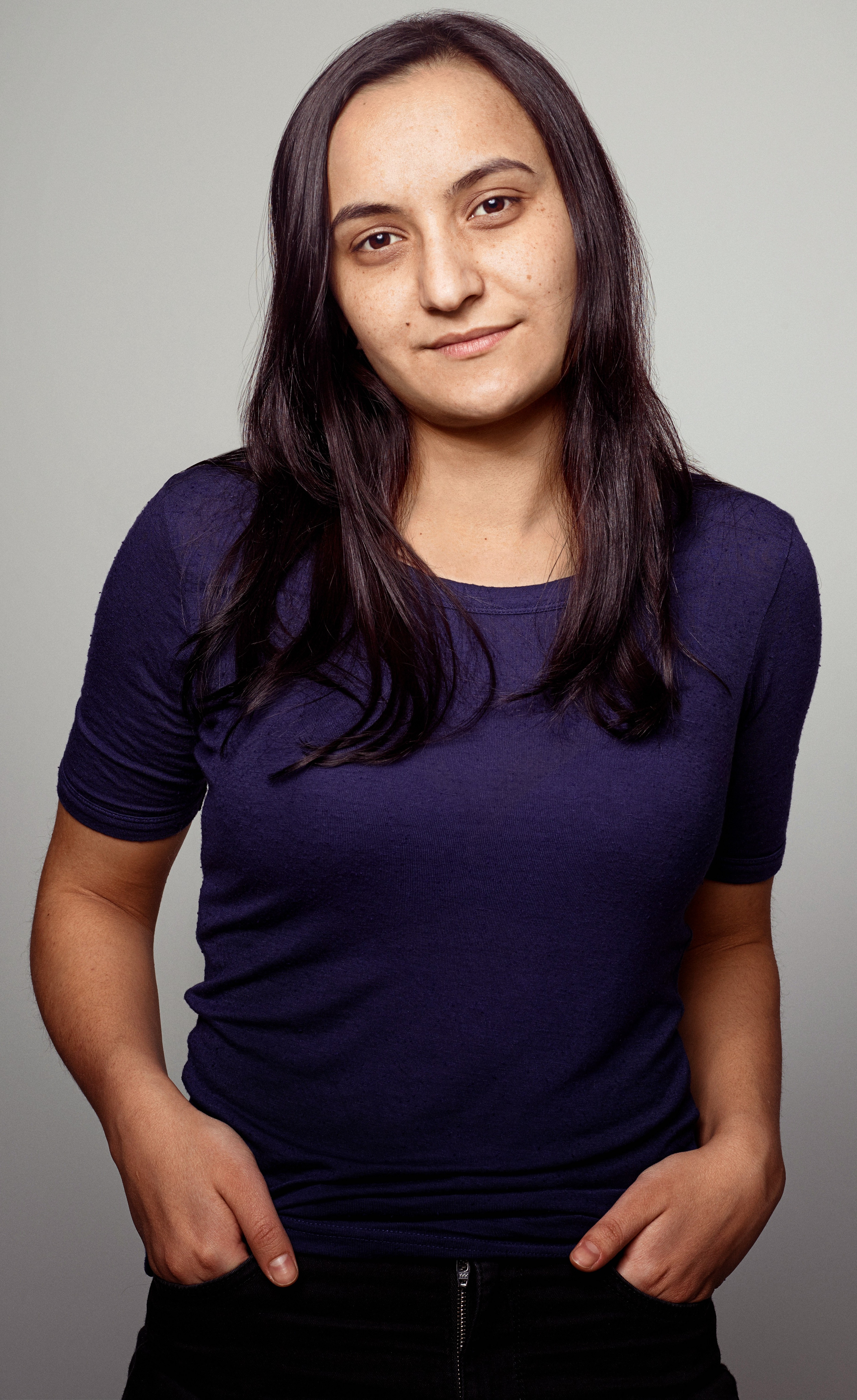

Member of the Storting
- Incumbent
- Assumed office 1 October 2021
- Constituency: Oslo

Personal details
- Born: 10 September 1989 (age 36) Turkey
- Party: Red

Seher Aydar (born 10 September 1989, Turkey) is a Norwegian politician of Kurdish descent. She is a member of the Red Party and was elected to the Norwegian Parliament (Storting) in the Parliamentary Elections of 2021.

== Early life and education ==
Aydar was born into a family from Konya, where she lived until she migrated to Norway at the age of eleven. In Norway she grew up in Frederikstad. She has been working at a kindergarten and was politically active from an early age particularly in organizations focusing on women's and Kurdish rights.

== Political career ==
She has taken a leading role within the Red Party, before in the term between 2017 and 2021, she became a substitute member of the Norwegian Parliament for Oslo. Additionally, she advised her party in the departments health and education. She has been supportive of the pro-Kurdish Peoples' Democratic Party in Turkey and also the developments of the Kurdish rights in Syria under the Autonomous Administration of North and East Syria. In September 2021, she was elected to the Norwegian Parliament representing the Red party.
