= Kurds in Sweden =

Ethnic group

Total population
- 170,000

Regions with significant populations
- Huddinge, Botkyrka, Västerås, Gothenburg, Örebro, Stockholm, Uppsala, Dalarna, Karlstad, Malmö, Borlänge, Falköping

Languages
- Kurdish, Swedish (some knowledge of Turkish, Arabic and Persian)

Religion
- Islam

Related ethnic groups
- Kurdish diaspora

Kurds in Sweden (Swedish: Kurder i Sverige; Kurdish: Kurdên Swêdê) may refer to people born in or residing in Sweden who are of Kurdish origin.

Most Kurdish people in Sweden live in the capital Stockholm or in Uppsala. A majority of Kurdish political refugees choose Sweden as their host country and therefore they have a cultural presence in Sweden.

== Chronological Kurdish arrivals to Sweden ==
- 1975: Huddinge becomes the first municipality offering Kurdish as a primary language.
- 1984: The education of Kurdish teachers in Stockholm begins.
- 1986-1990: Economical decline and the claimed mistreatment towards Kurdish people by the Turkish Republic led to immigration to Sweden.
- 1991-1995: The crises in Kuwait due to Iraqi invasion, the war in south Kurdistan, and mass exodus from Turkish Kurdistan into Iran.

== Political representation ==
In October 2019, thousands of Swedish Kurds staged a protest in Stockholm over Turkey's military operation in northeastern Syria. In Sweden there are several MP of Kurdish descent such Amineh Kakabaveh, Gulan Avci, Lawen Redar, Sara Gille or Kadir Kasirga. Kakabaveh was delivered the majority vote for that the Social Democrat Magdalena Andersson would become Swedish Prime Minister in 2021. As in May 2022 Sweden made an accession bid to join NATO, Turkey demanded that Sweden ends its alleged support for the Kurdish People's Defense Units (YPG) and Kurdistan Workers' Party (PKK).

== Controversies ==
=== Honor killings ===
The 26-year-old Kurdish woman Fadime Şahindal was murdered by her father in an honour killing in 2002. Kurdish organizations were criticized by prime minister Göran Persson for not doing enough to prevent honour killings. Pela Atroshi was a Kurdish girl who was shot by her uncle in a brutal honour killing. The murder of Pela and Fadime gave rise to the formation of the human rights organization Never Forget Pela and Fadime (GAPF). GAPF is a politically and religiously independent and secular nonprofit organization working against honor-related violence and oppression. The organization's name is taken from Pela Atroshi and Fadime Sahindal which is Sweden's best-known and high-profile cases of honor killings. The honor killing of Sara, an Iraqi Kurdish girl, was the first publicized honor killing in Sweden. These three prominent cases of Sara, Pela and Fadime, brought the notion of honour killings into Swedish discourse.

== Notable people ==
- Category:Swedish people of Kurdish descent
- Evin Ahmad, Swedish actress and author
- Amineh Kakabaveh, Swedish independent politician
- Soran Ismail, Swedish Kurdish comedian
- Rojda Sekersöz, Swedish director
- Evin Incir, Swedish politician
- Balsam Karam, Swedish writer and librarian
- Dilan Gwyn, Swedish-Kurdish actress
- Gulan Avci, Swedish politician
- Dee Demirbag, Swedish dancer and singer
- Kurdo Baksi, Swedish social commentator and author
- Dilba, Swedish pop singer
- Jwan Yosef, Swedish and Syrian painter and artist
- Rawez Lawan, Swedish former professional footballer
- Nalin Pekgul, Swedish Social Democratic politician
- Darin (singer), Swedish singer-songwriter
- Hayv Kahraman, Iraqi-American-Swedish artist

== See also ==
- Kurdish diaspora
- Immigration to Sweden
- Kurds in Denmark
- Kurds in Finland
- Kurds in Norway
- Kurdistan Region–Sweden relations
