= Iraq–Sweden relations =

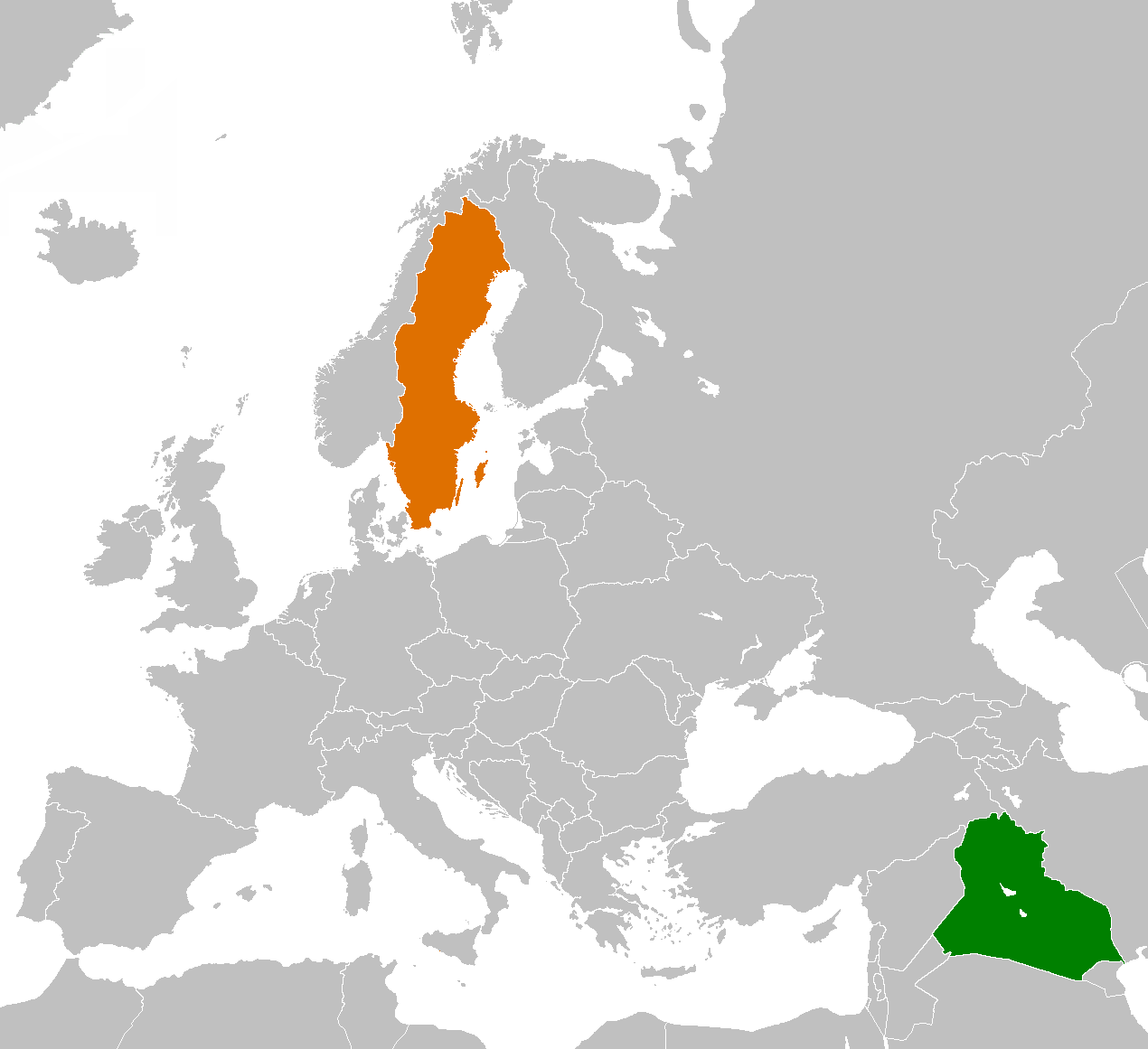
- Iraq: Sweden

Iraq–Sweden relations are the bilateral relations between Iraq and Sweden. Iraq maintains an embassy in Stockholm, while Sweden operates an embassy in Baghdad and a section office in Erbil. Relations deteriorated significantly in July 2023 following the Quran burnings in Sweden, prompting Iraq to expel the Swedish ambassador and Sweden to temporarily suspend embassy operations in Baghdad. By 2024, both nations began efforts to normalize relations and fully reopen the Swedish embassy. Sweden is also a contributor to NATO Mission Iraq, having joined the alliance in March 2024. There are approximately 200,000 people of Iraqi origin living in Sweden.

== History ==
=== Early relations ===
In 1903, Sweden began diplomatic relations with the then Ottoman Empire and a Swedish consulate was established.

In November 1934, the Crown Prince Gustaf Adolf and Crown Princess Margaret, Princess Ingrid and Prince Bertil visited Iraq. On 1 November they arrived in Baghdad. King Ghazi of Iraq met at his country house Kasr-el-Zuhoor, from where he accompanied his guests to Bilatt Castle, where they were invited to take up residence. At all the official events that followed, except for King Ghazi, his uncle and father-in-law, King Ali of Hejaz, the President of the Council and members of the Cabinet, the President of the Senate and others. On 6 November, the royals left by train for Khanaqin for further transport to Tehran. On 25 November the return trip to Baghdad began over the snowy passes along the Kum-Sultanabad-Kermanshah road. After a week-long unofficial stay in Baghdad with visits to modern factories and excursions to Ur and Babylon, the Crown Prince and Princess Ingrid left for Damascus on 5 December.

=== Embassy opening ===
In February 1960, Sweden opened an embassy office in Baghdad. The embassy office became an independent embassy in 1964 when Sweden's first resident ambassador to Baghdad was appointed.

=== Invasion of Kuwait and hostage crisis ===
On 2 August 1990, Iraq invaded its neighboring country, Kuwait. On 9 August, the Swedish embassy in Kuwait City received a direct order from the Iraqi Ministry of Foreign Affairs to close the embassy before 24 August. The letter stated that all diplomatic missions no longer had any official obligations to carry out in Kuwait. Instead, all diplomatic activities were to be moved to Baghdad. The Swedish government did not comply with Iraq’s request. Iraq’s chargé d’affaires in Stockholm was summoned to the Ministry for Foreign Affairs, where a note of protest was handed over.

On 24 August, Iraqi occupation forces in Kuwait City were stationed outside at least six embassies, including Sweden’s. Sweden did not accept Iraq’s invasion, and Ambassador Ingolf Kiesow and Embassy Secretary Lars-Erik Paulsson remained in place, keeping the embassy open. They were forced to leave Kuwait on 8 September and taken to Baghdad. At that time, 78 Swedes were being held hostage in Baghdad.

In early November 1990, 64 Swedes were still being held hostage in Baghdad, including Ambassador Kiesow and Embassy Secretary Paulsson. On 30 November 1990, Iraq released 53 of the 56 hostages, who arrived in Stockholm the same day. The remaining two were released and flown home to Sweden on 7 December.

=== 2023 Quran burnings and embassy attacks ===
On 29 June 2023, a group of protestors breached the Swedish embassy's perimeter. Protestors had taken to the streets on the orders of Muqtada al-Sadr. The previous day, a Quran had been burned during a protest in Stockholm.

On 20 July 2023 around 02:00 Arabia Standard Time (23:00 UTC, 19 July), the Swedish embassy was stormed by hundreds of protestors after police in Stockholm granted a permit for a demonstration there that was expected to feature another burning of a Quran. Fire and black smoke was seen coming from the embassy building. By dawn, Iraqi security forces and firefighters were inside the building. Iraq's foreign ministry issued a statement saying that they condemned the incident and that security forces had been instructed to investigate the incident swiftly. Swedish Minister for Foreign Affairs Tobias Billström stated that the embassy's staff was safe, though he also said that Iraq had failed in its responsibility under the Vienna Convention on Diplomatic Relations to protect the embassy. The convention's article 22 states in part that the host country "is under a special duty to [...] protect the premises of the mission against any intrusion or damage". The attack on the embassy was also condemned by the United States, Japan, Australia, the United Kingdom, and the European Union, with the U.S. calling Iraq's failure to protect the embassy "unacceptable".

On the same day, Iraqi Prime Minister Mohammed Shia' al-Sudani, prompted by "repeated incidents of desecration of the sacred Qur'an" and "insults to Islamic shrines and the burning of the Iraqi flag", ordered the withdrawal of the Iraqi charge d’affaires in Stockholm and expelled the Swedish ambassador to Iraq, effectively severing diplomatic ties with Sweden. However, the Iraqi embassy in Stockholm continued to operate.

=== 2024–2025 normalization and NATO ===
Following the 2023 diplomatic crisis, Sweden maintained a diplomatic presence in Baghdad through its Chargé d'Affaires, Jorgen Lindstrom. Lindstrom held meetings with Iraqi officials, including National Security Adviser Qasim al-Araji, to discuss the reopening of the Swedish embassy. On 7 March 2024, Sweden officially joined NATO and subsequently participated in NATO Mission Iraq (NMI), an advisory and capacity-building mission. By early 2025, Lindstrom was recognized as the Head of Mission and Ambassador of Sweden to Iraq, engaging in bilateral meetings with Iraqi government officials and foreign diplomats in Baghdad.

== Trade ==
Bilateral trade between the two countries has fluctuated over the decades. During the 1980s, several large Swedish engineering and infrastructure companies maintained a significant presence in Iraq. According to the Swedish Export Credit Agency (EKN), guarantees worth SEK 3.1 billion were issued for Swedish companies exporting to Iraq in 2023, indicating sustained commercial interest in the Iraqi market despite political tensions. Swedish exports primarily consist of engineering products, machinery, and telecommunications equipment.

== Iraqi diaspora in Sweden ==
There are approximately 200,000 people of Iraqi origin living in Sweden, according to Statistics Sweden (SCB). Iraq and Syria have consistently been among the most common countries of origin for foreign-born residents in the country.

During the Iraq War and subsequent sectarian conflict, Sweden was a primary destination for Iraqi asylum seekers. In 2007, Sweden received roughly half of all Iraqi asylum applications made in Europe. The peak of Iraqi migration occurred during the 2015 European migrant crisis, when Iraq was the third-largest country of origin for asylum seekers in Sweden, with just over 21,000 applications filed that year. Since 2016, Sweden has significantly tightened its asylum policies, resulting in a sharp decline in new applications from Iraq.

== Resident diplomatic missions ==
- Iraq has an embassy in Stockholm.
- Sweden has an embassy in Baghdad and a section office in Erbil. Following a temporary suspension of operations in 2023, Sweden initiated the process of fully reopening its Baghdad embassy in 2024.
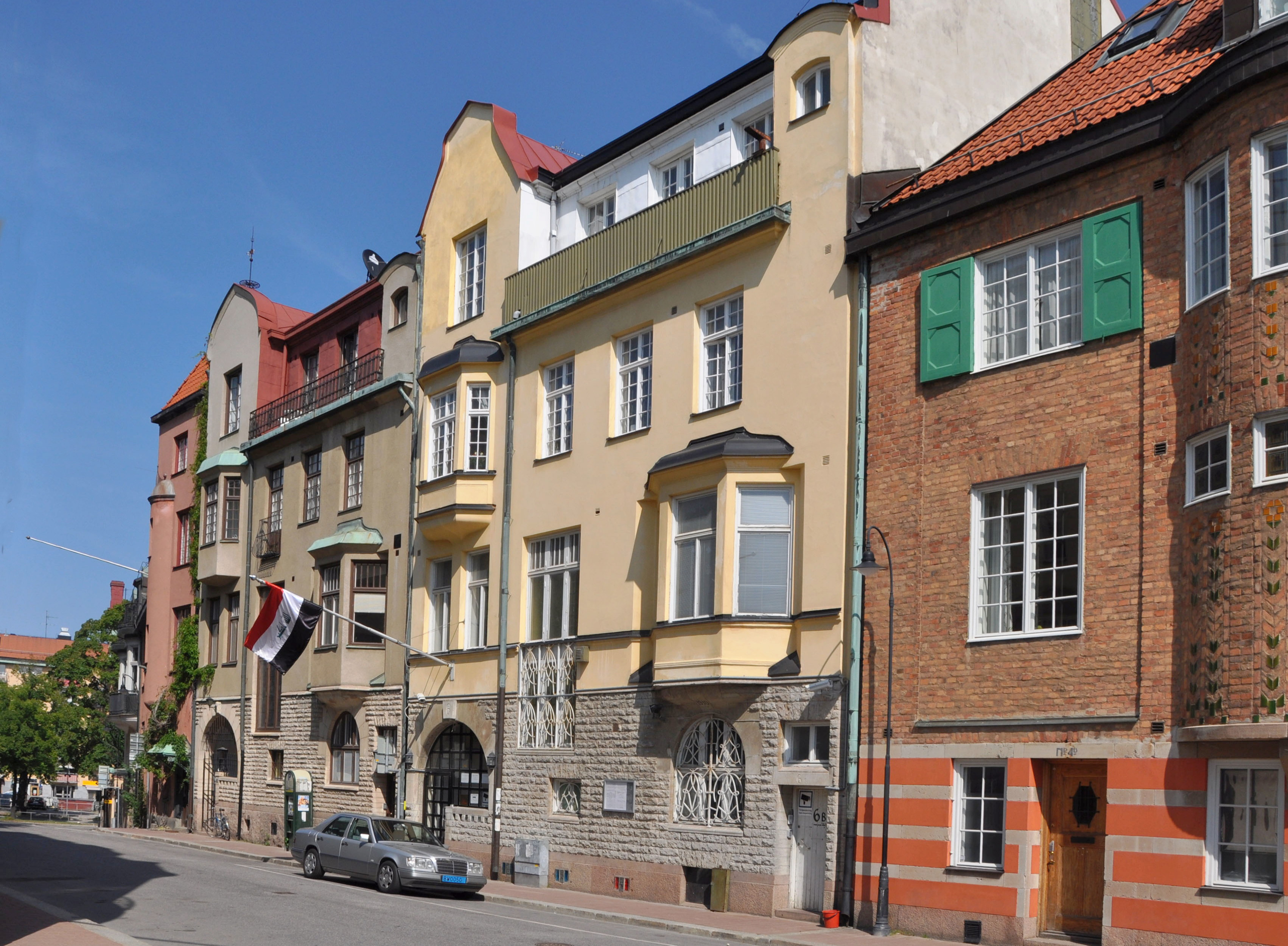
Embassy of Iraq in Stockholm

== See also ==
- Foreign relations of Iraq
- Foreign relations of Sweden
- Iraqis in Sweden
- Kurdistan Region–Sweden relations
