= Belgium–Kurdistan Region relations =

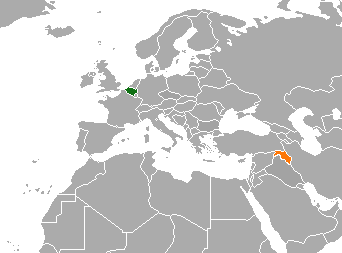
- Belgium: Kurdistan Region

Belgium–Kurdistan Region relations are bilateral relations between Belgium and Kurdistan Region (Note: While Kurdistan Region refers to the autonomous Kurdish region in Northern Iraq, Iraqi Kurdistan is a geographical term referring to the Kurdish area of Iraq). Belgium has no representation in Kurdistan Region and the latter has no representation in Belgium. Kurdistan Region's representation to the European Union is located in the Belgian capital of Brussels. Belgium has a military presence in Kurdistan Region with circa 30 soldiers training Kurdish soldiers (Peshmerga). In 2017, Kurdish President Massoud Barzani visited Belgium and met with Minister-President Geert Bourgeois of the federal region of Flanders, where the latter stated that the upcoming Kurdish referendum in September 2017 should be respected and Deputy Prime Minister of the federal government in Belgium Jan Jambon has stated that all nations have the right to self-determination.

== History ==
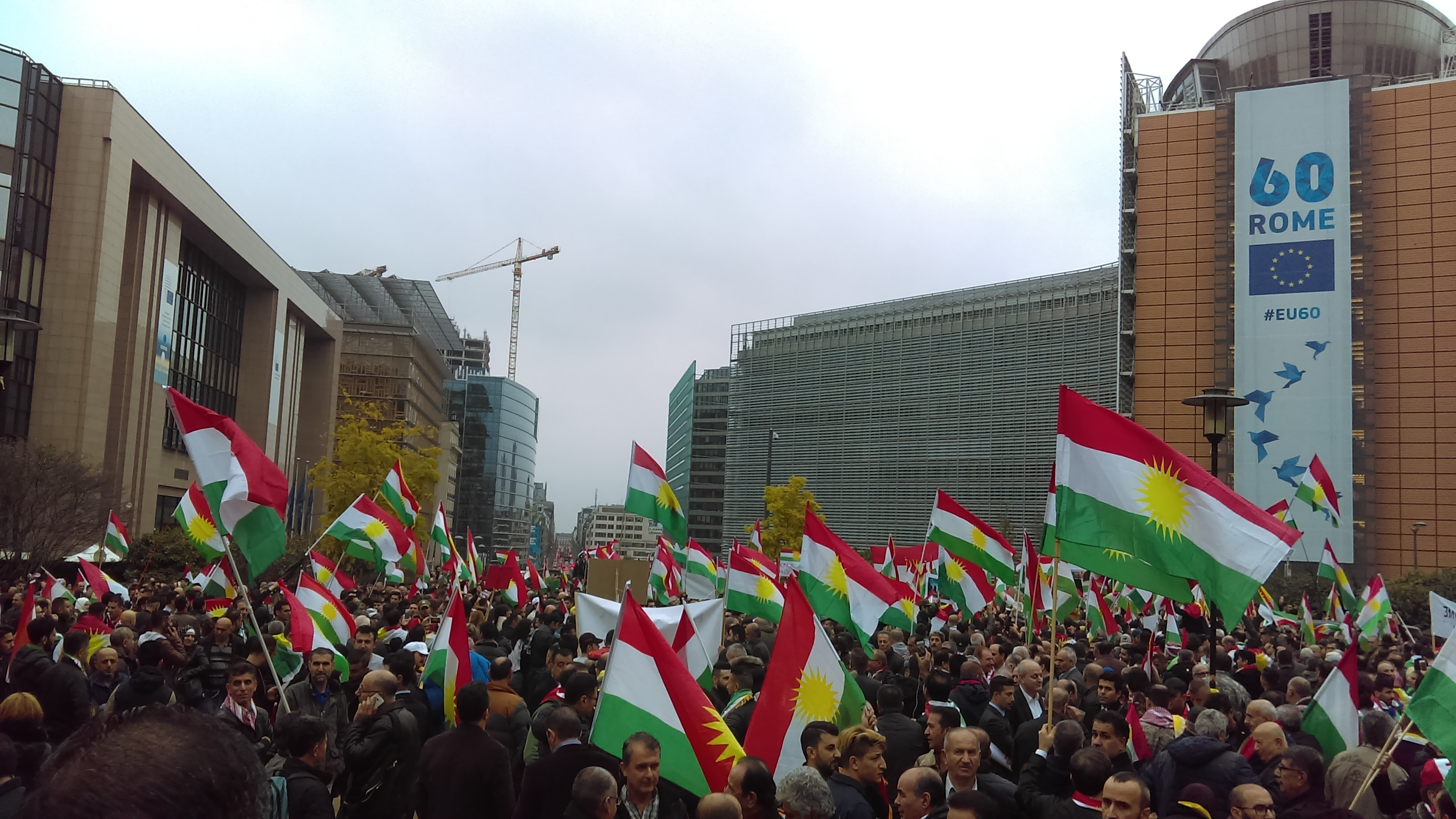
Kurdish demonstration at Schuman, Brussels, 25 October 2017

Belgian Foreign Minister Karel de Gucht visited Erbil in May 2009 to discuss economic ties with Kurdish President Masoud Barzani. In 2016, the Belgian government delivered 41 loads of medical aid to Kurdish soldiers, and the regional government of Flanders decided to provide medical help for wounded Peshmerga. In 2014, Flandern had already aided Kurdistan Region with 400,000 euros for sanitation and water through Red Cross. That same year, Belgian politician Georges Dallemagne said that: "The Kurdistan Region has done an impressive job in sheltering IDPs and refugees and protecting and defending the civilians and ethnic and religious minority groups against the barbaric acts of Islamic State terrorists." Belgium also decided to allocate 13,5 million euros to Kurdistan Region to cope with the growing number of internally displaced people. In 2017, Belgium and Kurdistan Region signed an agreement on the deportation of convicted Kurdish refugees in Belgium.

== See also ==
- Foreign relations of Belgium
- Foreign relations of Kurdistan Region
- Kurdish Institute of Brussels
- Kurds in Belgium
