= Milan Jaff =

Kurdish rapper and criminal

- Born: 2000 (age 25–26); Iraq
- Other name: Milan J4ff
- Occupations: Rapper; social media influencer
- Known for: Criminal activities in Finland
- Criminal charges: Several, including assault, rape, attempted murder

Milan Jaff (born 2000) is an Iraqi-born Kurdish criminal, rapper and social media influencer who was active in Finland until his deportation.

== Biography ==
=== In Finland (2017–2025) ===
Jaff moved to Finland at the end of 2017 at the age of 16 alone from Iraqi Kurdistan, after first staying in at least Bulgaria and Denmark. Milan led the Helsinki-based Kurdish Mafia street gang. As of June 2022, Jaff's Instagram account had over 91,000 followers and his YouTube channel had over 7,500 subscribers and over two million views.

Jaff has actively promoted his gangsta lifestyle on social media. The lyrics of his rap songs emphasize his own gang and gang life with crime, violence, drugs, and anti-authoritarian and anti-social behavior. In February 2022, Helsinki Police reported that Jaff was a leading figure of a Helsinki street gang of immigrant background. The Helsinki court of appeals ruled in June 2024 that the Kurdish Mafia group and its activities do not constitute organized crime, as it could not be proven that the group had an established roster of members or that it had committed criminal acts for a prolonged period of time.

Jaff has been convicted of several crimes, including assault, rape, attempted murder, firearms offenses, threatening a person being heard in the administration of justice, aggravated robbery, aggravated deprivation of liberty, and drug offenses. Jaff was also convicted of aggravated child rape for allegedly raping 13-year-old girl after giving her intoxicants, but the conviction was later overturned.

The Finnish Immigration Service revoked Jaff's residence permit in September 2025 and ordered him to be deported to Iraq. Jaff appealed the decision to the Administrative Court. However, he withdrew his appeal and intended to return to Iraq voluntarily. He was deported in December 2025.

In November 2025, Jaff was sentenced to 70 days in prison for aggravated dissemination of information violating personal privacy and aggravated defamation. The case concerned rape convictions that Jaff had previously received. In a podcast hosted by Finnish-Iranian Milad Dehghan in October 2022, Jaff and Dehghan had defamed the victims of those rapes.

=== Later life ===
In September 2026, Jaff married a Finnish woman in Iraqi Kurdistan.

== See also ==
- Immigration and crime in Finland
