= Kurds in Pakistan =

Ethnic group

Kurdên li Pakistanê

Total population
- 4,000–5,000

Regions with significant populations
- Islamabad · Karachi

Languages
- Mostly: Kurdish · Urdu; Others: Turkish · Arabic (Kurdish dialects)

Religion
- Islam (Sunni Muslim, but also Shia Muslim)

Related ethnic groups
- Other Iranic peoples

There is a small population of people of Kurdish origin residing in Pakistan, consisting mainly of expatriates and transient migrants, most of whom arrived following the start of the Gulf War in Iraq in 1990.

== Demographics ==
External videos
- PAKISTAN: POLICE TEAR GAS KURDISH REFUGEES.

As many as 4,000–5,000 Kurds, originating from Iraqi Kurdistan, migrated to Pakistan in the early 1990s when the Gulf War broke out in Iraq. A large number of them were based in Islamabad. As of 2013, up to 240 Iraqi Kurds were still living in the country. The majority of them were secondary migrants and asylum seekers, and were registered with the United Nations High Commissioner for Refugees (UNHCR) operating in Pakistan. Among them is a younger generation which is born in Pakistan. Over the years, these transient migrants have been able to obtain immigration and have resettled in other countries in Europe and North America, with the help of the UNHCR.

As Pakistan is not a signatory of the 1951 refugee convention, most Kurdish migrants are not able to acquire Pakistani citizenship. Due to their legal status, many tend to face social challenges relating to economic constraints, finding employment, healthcare, resettlement and other services. Members of the Kurdish community have raised their concerns with the UNHCR and other authorities, calling for the addressing of such issues.

== Notable people ==
- Rez Gardi, New Zealand lawyer and human rights activist
- Saqi (actor), Pakistani film and television actor. He is known for mostly playing supportive roles in the Lollywood movies. He starred in more than 500 Urdu, Punjabi, Sindhi, and Pashto films.
- Benazir Bhutto, Pakistani politician, Prime Minister of Kurdish origin
- Fatima Bhutto, Pakistani Writer
- Murtaza Bhutto, Pakistani politician and leader of al-Zulfiqar, a Pakistani left-wingmilitant organization
- Nusrat Bhutto, public figure of Kurdish origin, who served as spouse of the Prime Minister of Pakistan between 1971 until the 1977 coup, and as a senior member of the federal cabinet between 1988 and 1990.
- Shahnawaz Bhutto, son of Zulfiqar Ali Bhutto former President and Prime Minister of Pakistan from 1971 to 1977 and Begum Nusrat Bhutto, who was of Iranian Kurdish descent
- Zulfikar Ali Bhutto Jr., Pakistani visual artist, performance artist and curator.
- Nahid Mirza, aristocrat who became the first lady of Pakistan from 1956 to 1958
- Bilawal Bhutto Zardari, Pakistani politician and the current chairman of the Pakistan Peoples Party.

== See also ==
- Kurdish diaspora
- Kurdish refugees
- Immigration to Pakistan
