= Kurdistan Region–Sweden relations =

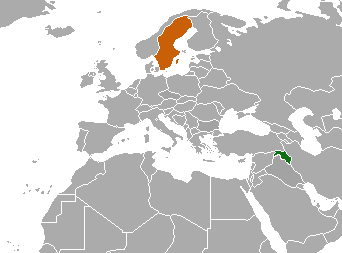
- Kurdistan Region: Sweden

Kurdistan Region–Sweden relations are bilateral relations between Kurdistan Region (Note: While Kurdistan Region refers to the autonomous Kurdish region in Northern Iraq, Iraqi Kurdistan is a geographical term referring to the Kurdish area of Iraq) and Sweden. Kurdistan Region is represented in Sweden through a representation in Stockholm since 2011, while Sweden has an embassy in Erbil since 2012.

Trade between the two parties amounted 154 million dollars in 2012. There were 56 registered Swedish companies registered in Kurdistan Region that year. Swedish MP Fredrik Malm stated that "We are friends of the Kurdish people and we follow the events closely, and our key objective is to support the self-determination of the Kurdish people."

Swedish Foreign Minister Margot Wallström met Kurdish Foreign Minister Falah Mustafa in January 2015 and discussed humanitarian aid for the internally displaced people in the region. In November same year, Wallström and Swedish Defense Minister Peter Hultqvist travelled to Erbil and pledged support for Kurdish forces fighting ISIS. 70 Swedish soldiers have been sent to Erbil to train Kurdish soldiers in urban warfare, healthcare, and protection against chemical weapons. In October 2016, Swedish Prime Minister Stefan Löfven visited Erbil, where he met Kurdish President Masoud Barzani, Prime Minister Nechirvan Barzani and the stationed Swedish soldiers.

== See also ==
- Foreign relations of Kurdistan Region
- Foreign relations of Sweden
- Iraq–Sweden relations
- Kurds in Sweden
