= Annikki Paasikivi =

Finnish architect

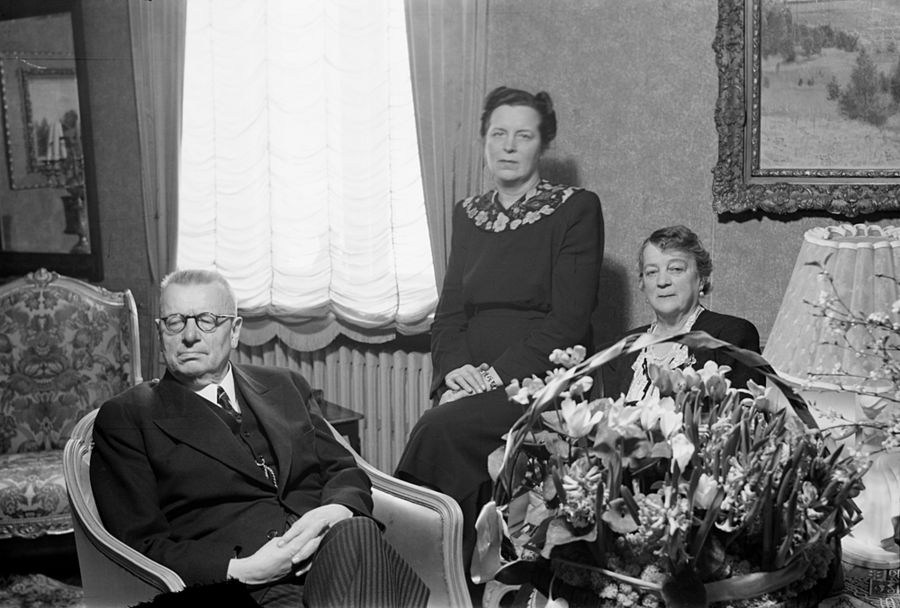
Paasikivi with her mother and father

Annikki Paasikivi (1898–1950) was a Finnish architect. She was the daughter of Juho Kusti Paasikivi (the seventh president of Finland) and his wife Anna Matilda Forsman. Annikki was the oldest of their four children.

A scholarship fund at Aalto University is named for her. For a time she did a "woman's hour" on Finnish radio. Her two brothers died in World War II from injuries they had received.

== In literature ==
Bengali writer Syed Mujtaba Ali mentions a chapter about her in his book Panchatantra that she knew many languages, possessed a skill for radios and was eloquent.
