= Bülent Pekerman =

Turkish politician (born 1977)

Bülent Pekerman (born 16 May 1977) is a driving teacher and a politician of the Green Liberal Party of Switzerland (GLP). He is the president of the Grand Council of Basel.

== Early life and education ==
Bülent Pekerman was born into a Kurdish family. In 1984 his father emigrated to Switzerland where he first worked in construction and later as a cab driver. In 1992 his siblings and mother followed the father to Switzerland. He learned German, adapted to the new environment and after a year his teacher suggested he enters the Gymnasium (the highest high school in the Swiss Education system). But he could not adapt to the local dialect which is the language spoken by the majority of the students during the breaks between classes and he then did not graduate. He then settled for the Diplommittelschule, a level below the Gymnasium. He believes that if he had the same possibilities from the start, he could have made it. This experience would influence his political career during which he supported equal possibilities for all. After he completed high school, he would become a cab driver and later open his driving school. He contends that this is not a contradiction to a politician in green politics as he advises his students not to drive for short distances and also supports carsharing.

== Political career ==
He was interested in politics from an early life and believes Kurds must be politically interested as they are oppressed in their homeland be it in Turkey, Syria, Iran or Iraq. After he gained the Swiss citizenship in 2007 he became interested in the GLP which was formed in Zürich. Two years later, the GLP also formed a branch in Basel of which he became a member. The same year, he was elected into the Grand Council of Basel. He would not stand for re-election in 2013 and paused from parliamentary politics. In 2021 he again stood as a candidate for the GLP and was elected into the Grand Council of Basel. Following he was elected as the Statthalter (vice-president), of the Grand Council for the term 2022/2023. In February 2023 he assumed as the president of the Grand Council of Basel as the successor of Jo Vergeat and in the same month he was announced as a candidate for the National Council (the lower chamber of the Swiss Parliament).
