= European Kurdish Democratic Societies Congress =

Kurdish organization

The European Kurdish Democratic Societies Congress (Kurdish: Kongreya Civakên Demokratîk a Kurdîstanîyên Ewrupa; abbreviated KCD-E; known as the Confederation of Kurdish Associations in Europe or KON-KURD until 2014) is a European Kurdish association, headquartered in Charleroi, Belgium. The member federations are located in several European countries, with some associations from Australia and Canada also belonging to the federation. KCD-E is the biggest organisation of Kurds in Exile. Its members are mostly Kurds from Turkey. According to Der Tagesspiegel, the confederation has close ties to PKK and EUROPOL has designated it as an umbrella organization for PKK operations in Europe.
