= Kurdish population =

Ethnic group

Kurds: Kurdish: Kurd; کورد
Total population
- Turkey (14.7 million (18%)); Iran (8.1 million (10%)); Iraq (5.5 million (17.5%)); Syria (1.7 million (9.7%)); Western Europe: 1.5–1.7 million Total: 31–32 million

Languages
- Kurdish and Zaza–Gorani languages

Religion
- Sunni Islam (incl. Sufism), Shia Islam, Alevism, Yazidism, Yarsanism, with minorities of Zoroastrianism, Christianity and Judaism

Related ethnic groups
- Other Iranian peoples

The Kurdish population is estimated to be between 30 and 45 million. Most Kurdish people live in Kurdistan, which today is split between Iranian Kurdistan, Iraqi Kurdistan, Turkish Kurdistan, and Syrian Kurdistan.

== Kurdistan ==
The bulk of Kurdish groups in Kurdistan are Sunni (mostly of the Shafi'i school), but there are significant minorities adhering to Shia Islam (especially Alevis), Yazidism, Yarsanism, Christianity and Judaism.

=== Turkey ===
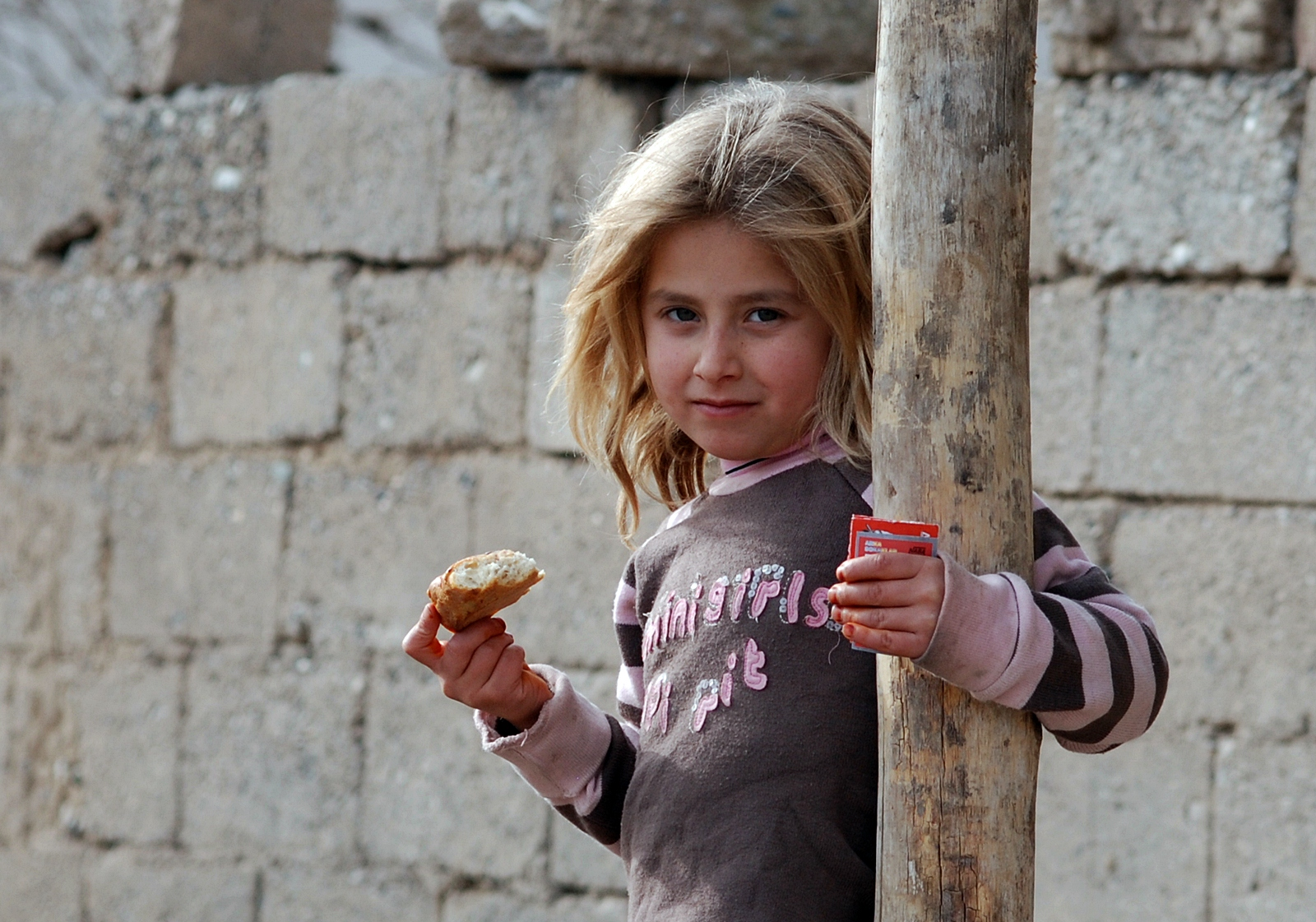
Kurdish girl in Mardin Province

According to a report by Turkish agency KONDA, in 2006, out of the total population of 73 million people in Turkey there were 11.4 million Kurds and Zazas living in Turkey (close to 15.68% of the total population). The Turkish newspaper Milliyet reported in 2008 that the Kurdish population in Turkey is 12.6 million; although this also includes 3 million Zazas. According to the World Factbook, Kurdish people make up 18% of Turkey's population (about 14 million, out of 77.8 million people). Kurdish sources put the figure at 10 to 15 million Kurds in Turkey.

Kurds mostly live in Northern Kurdistan, in Southeastern and Eastern Anatolia. But large Kurdish populations can be found in western Turkey due to internal migration. According to Rüstem Erkan, Istanbul is the province with the largest Kurdish population in Turkey.

=== Iran ===
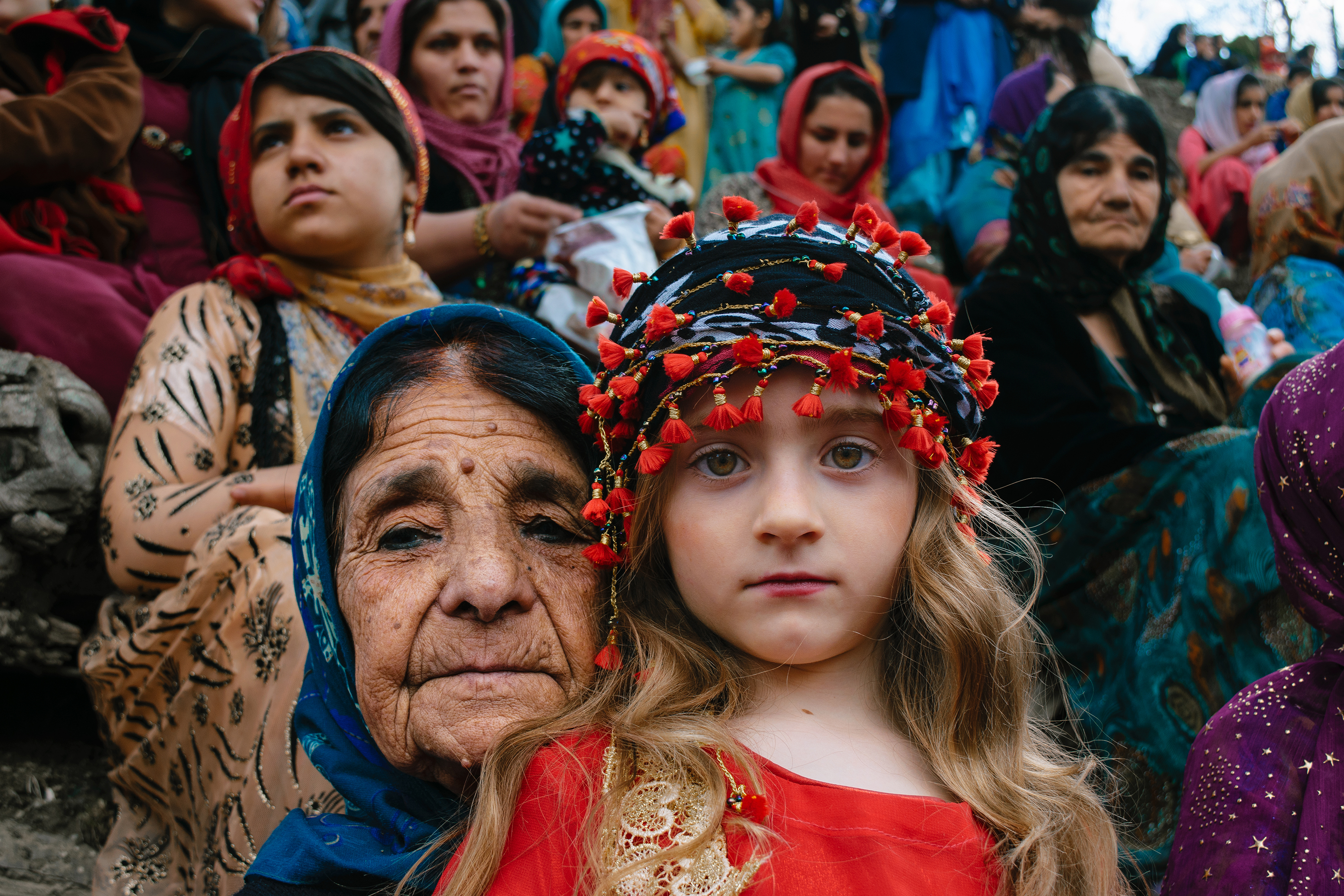
Kurdish family in Bisaran, Iran

From the 7 million Iranian Kurds, majority who are Sunni. Shia Kurds inhabit Kermanshah Province, except for those parts where people are Jaff, and Ilam Province Province; as well as some parts of Kurdistan, Hamadan and Zanjan provinces. The Kurds of Khorasan Province in northeastern Iran are also adherents of Shia Islam. During the Shia revolution in Iran the major Kurdish political parties were unsuccessful in absorbing Shia Kurds, who at that period had no interest in autonomy. However, since the 1990s Kurdish nationalism has seeped into the Shia Kurdish area partly due to outrage against government's violent suppression of Kurds farther north.

=== Iraq ===
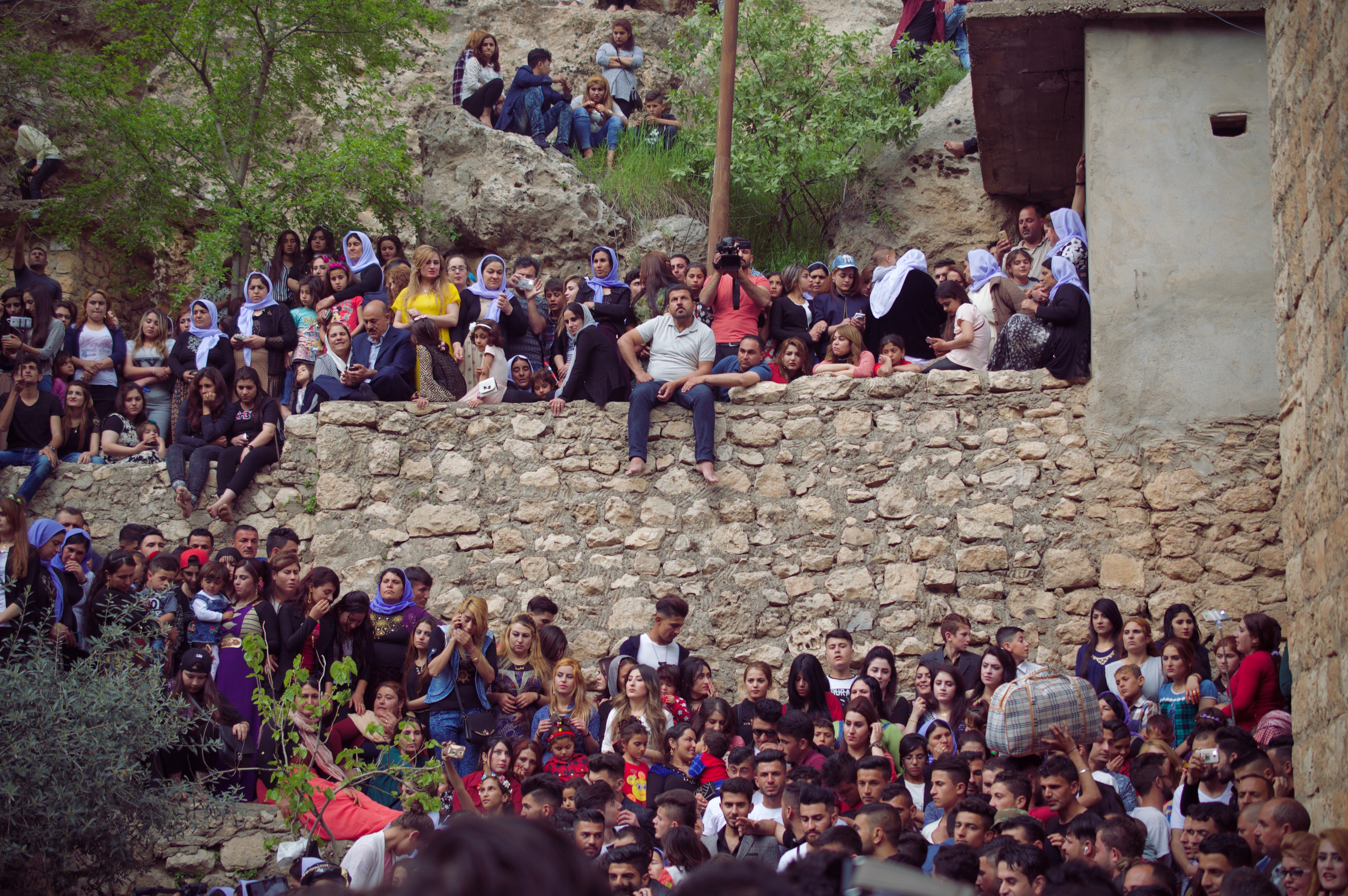
Yazidi pilgrimage to Lalish temple in Iraqi Kurdistan

Kurds constitute approximately 17% of Iraq's population. They are the majority in at least three provinces in northern Iraq which are together known as Iraqi Kurdistan. Kurds also have a presence in Kirkuk, Mosul, Khanaqin, and Baghdad. Around 300,000 Kurds live in the Iraqi capital Baghdad, 50,000 in the city of Mosul and around 100,000 elsewhere in southern Iraq.

Kurds led by Mustafa Barzani were engaged in heavy fighting against successive Iraqi regimes from 1960 to 1975. In March 1970, Iraq announced a peace plan providing for Kurdish autonomy. The plan was to be implemented in four years. However, at the same time, the Iraqi regime started an Arabization program in the oil-rich regions of Kirkuk and Khanaqin. The peace agreement did not last long, and in 1974, the Iraqi government began a new offensive against the Kurds. Moreover, in March 1975, Iraq and Iran signed the Algiers Accord, according to which Iran cut supplies to Iraqi Kurds. Iraq started another wave of Arabization by moving Arabs to the oil fields in Kurdistan, particularly those around Kirkuk. Between 1975 and 1978, 200,000 Kurds were deported to other parts of Iraq.

=== Syria ===
Kurds are the largest ethnic minority in Syria and make up nine percent of the country's population. Syrian Kurds have faced routine discrimination and harassment by the government.

Syrian Kurdistan is an unofficial name used by some to describe the Kurdish inhabited regions of northern and northeastern Syria. The northeastern Kurdish inhabited region covers the greater part of Hasakah Governorate. The main cities in this region are Qamishli and Hasakah. Another region with significant Kurdish population is Kobanê (Ayn al-Arab) in the northern part of Syria near the town of Jarabulus and also the city of Afrin and its surroundings along the Turkish border.

Many Kurds seek political autonomy for the Kurdish inhabited areas of Syria, similar to Iraqi Kurdistan in Iraq, or outright independence as part of Kurdistan. The name "Western Kurdistan" (Kurdish: Rojavayê Kurdistanê) is also used by Kurds to name the Syrian Kurdish inhabited areas in relation to Kurdistan. Since the Syrian civil war, Syrian government forces have abandoned many Kurdish-populated areas, leaving the Kurds to fill the power vacuum and govern these areas autonomously.

== Transcaucasus ==
=== Armenia ===
According to the 2011 Armenian Census, 37,470 Kurds live in Armenia. They mainly live in the western parts of Armenia. The Kurds of the former Soviet Union first began writing Kurdish in the Armenian alphabet in the 1920s, followed by Latin in 1927, then Cyrillic in 1945, and now in both Cyrillic and Latin. The Kurds in Armenia established a Kurdish radio broadcast from Yerevan and the first Kurdish newspaper Riya Teze. There is a Kurdish Department in the Yerevan State Institute of Oriental studies. The Kurds of Armenia were the first exiled country to have access to media such as radio, education and press in their native tongue but many Kurds, from 1939 to 1959 were listed as the Azeri population or even as Armenians.

=== Georgia ===
According to the 2002 Georgian Census, 20,843 Kurds live in Georgia The Kurds in Georgia mainly live in the capital of Tbilisi and Rustavi. According to a United Nations High Commissioner for Refugees report from 1998, about 80% of the Kurdish population in Georgia are assimilated Kurds.

== Diaspora ==
There were also many Kurds among the Kurdish diaspora and in Red Kurdistan.

=== Russia ===
According to the 2010 Russian Census, 63,818 Kurds live in Russia. Russia has maintained warm relations with the Kurds for a long time, During the early 19th century, the main goal of the Russian Empire was to ensure the neutrality of the Kurds, in the wars against Persia and the Ottoman Empire. In the beginning of the 19th century, Kurds settled in Transcaucasia, at a time when Transcaucasia was incorporated into the Russian Empire. In the 20th century, Kurds were persecuted and exterminated by the Turks and Persians, a situation that led Kurds to move to Russia.

=== Lebanon ===
The existence of a community of at least 125,000 Kurds is the product of several waves of immigrants, the first major wave was in the period of 1925–1950 when thousands of Kurds fled violence and poverty in Turkey. Kurds in Lebanon go back far as the twelfth century A.D. when the Ayyubids arrived there. Over the next few centuries, several other Kurdish families were sent to Lebanon by a number of powers to maintain rule in those regions, others moved as a result of poverty and violence in Kurdistan. These Kurdish groups settled in and ruled many areas of Lebanon for a long period of time. Kurds of Lebanon settled in Lebanon because of Lebanon's pluralistic society.

=== European Union ===
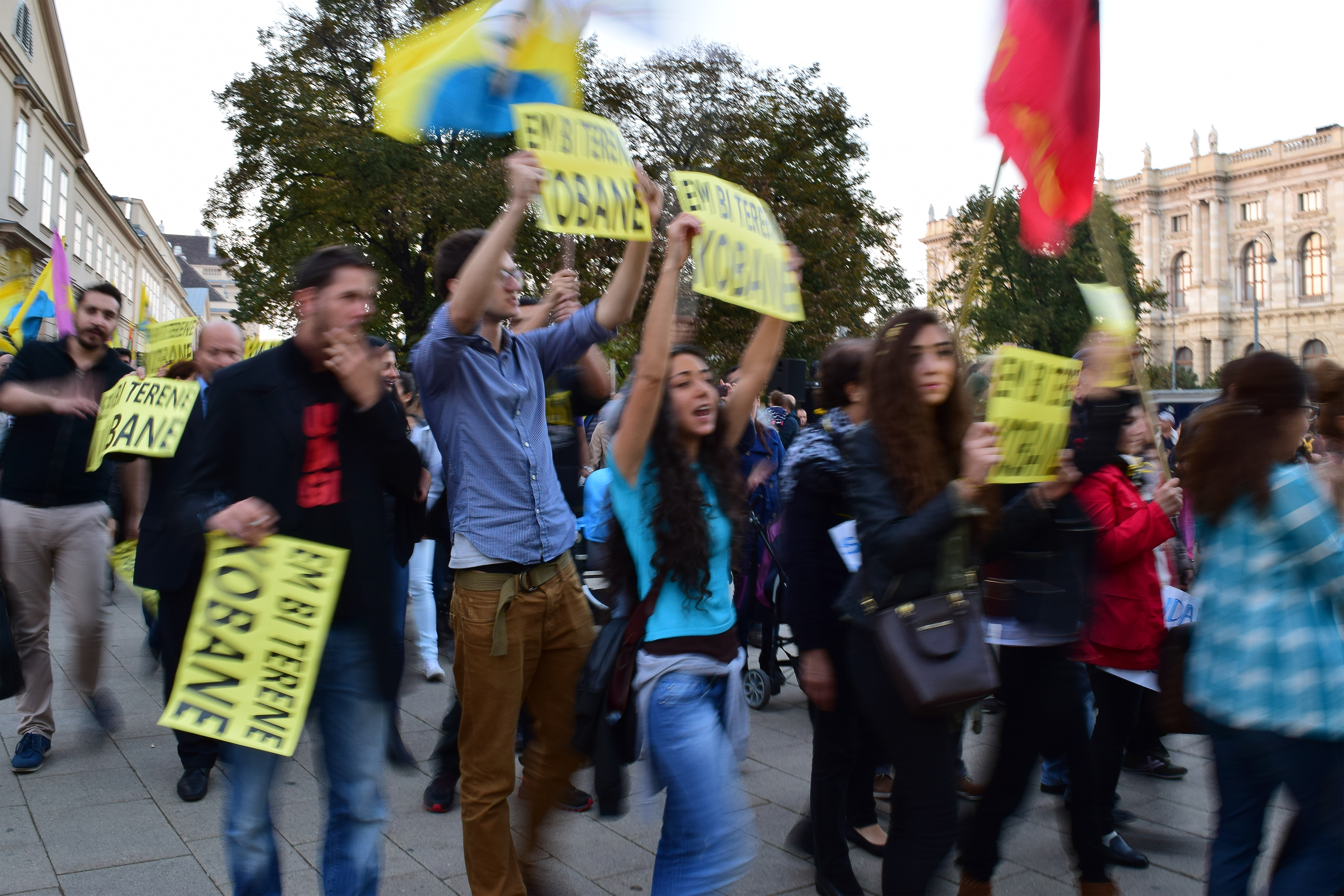
Kurdish demonstration against ISIS, Vienna, Austria, 10 October 2014

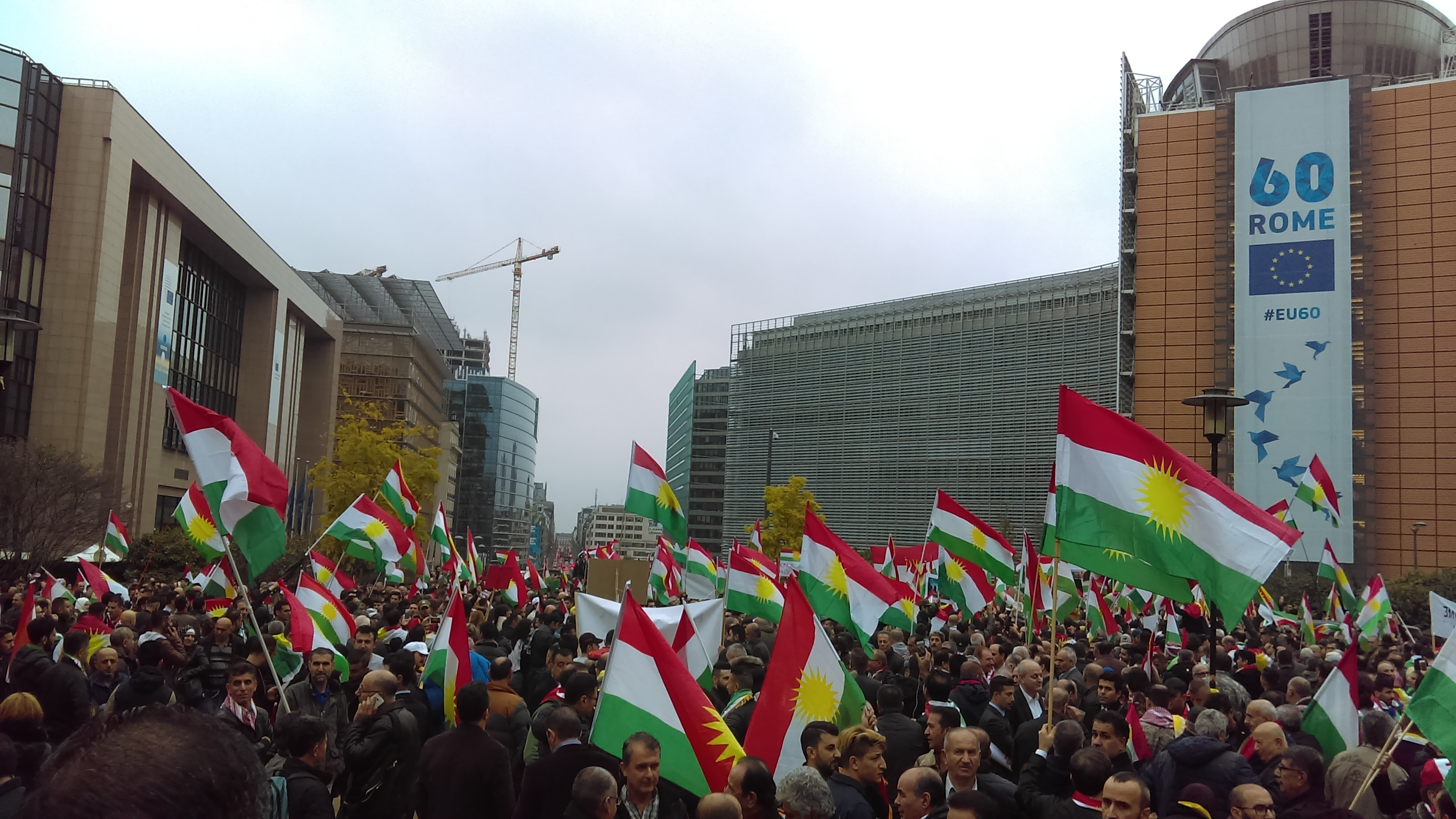
Demonstration in support of the independence of Iraqi Kurdistan at Schuman, Brussels, 25 October 2017

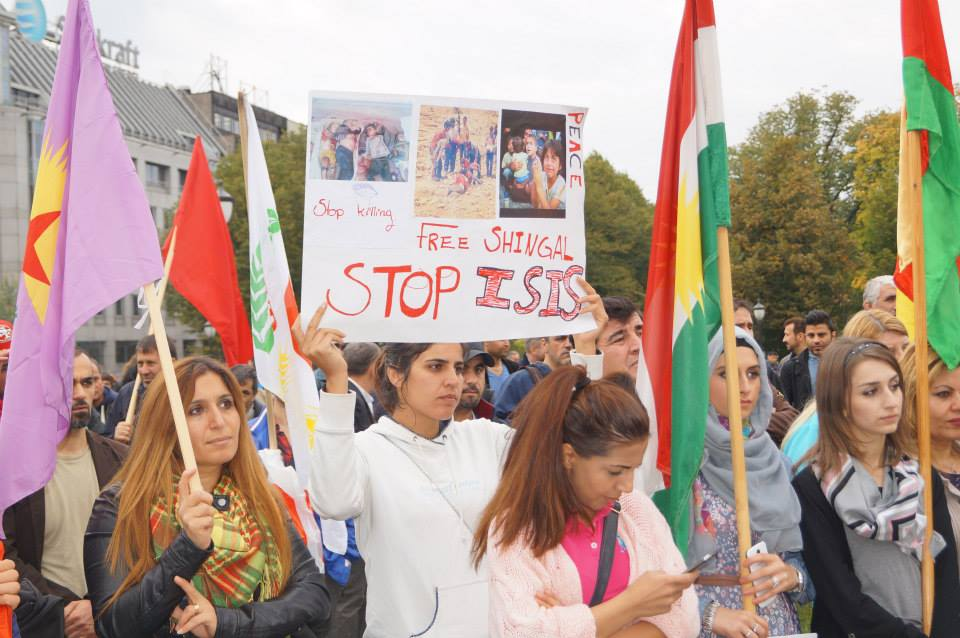
Kurdish demonstration against ISIS in Norway, 12 May 2016

The Kurdish diaspora in the European Union is most significant in Germany, France, Sweden, Belgium and the Netherlands. Kurds from Turkey went to Germany and France during the 1960s as immigrant workers. Thousands of Kurdish refugees and political refugees fled from Turkey to Sweden during the 1970s and onward, and from Iraq during the 1980s and 1990s.

In France, the Iranian Kurds make up the majority of the community. However, thousands of Iraqi Kurds also arrived in the mid-1990s. More recently, Syrian Kurds have been entering France illegally

In the United Kingdom, Kurds first began to immigrate between 1974 and 1975 when the rebellion of Iraqi Kurds against the Iraqi government was repressed. The Iraqi government began to destroy Kurdish villages and forced many Kurds to move to barren land in the south. These events resulted in many Kurds fleeing to the United Kingdom. Thus, the Iraqi Kurds make up a large part of the community. In 1979, Ayatollah Khomeini came to power in Iran and installed Islamic law. There was widespread political oppression and persecution of the Kurdish community. Since the late 1970s the number of people from Iran seeking asylum in Britain has remained high. In 1988, Saddam Hussein launched the Anfal campaign in the northern Iraq. This included mass executions and disappearances of the Kurdish community. The use of chemical weapons against thousands of towns and villages in the region, as well as the town of Halabja increased the number of Iraq Kurds entering the United Kingdom. A large number of Kurds also came to the United Kingdom following the 1980 military coup in Turkey. More recently, immigration has been due to the continued political oppression and the repression of ethnic and religious minorities in Iraq and Iran. Estimates of the Kurdish population in the United Kingdom are as high as 200–250,000.

In Denmark, there is a significant number of Iraqi political refugees, many of which are Kurds.

In Finland, most Kurds arrived in the 1990s as Iraqi refugees. Kurds in Finland have no great attachment to the Iraqi state because of their position as a persecuted minority. Thus, they feel more accepted and comfortable in Finland, many wanting to get rid of their Iraqi citizenship.

From 1994 to 1999, 43,759 Kurds entered Greece illegally and of the 9,797 who applied for asylum 524 were granted it.

=== North America ===
In the United States, estimates of the Kurdish population vary from 15,000 to 20,000 to 58,000. During the 1991 Persian Gulf War, about 10,000 Iraqi refugees were admitted to the United States, most of which were Kurds and Shiites who had assisted or were sympathisers of the U.S. –led war. Nashville, Tennessee has the nation's largest population of Kurdish people, with an estimated 8,000–11,000. There are also Kurds in Southern California, Los Angeles, San Diego, and Dallas, Texas.

In Canada, the Kurdish community is 11,685 based on the Canadian Census 2011, among which the Iraqi Kurds make up the largest group of Kurds in Canada, exceeding the numbers of Kurds from Turkey, Iran and Syria. Kurdish immigration was largely the result of the Iran–Iraq War, the Gulf War and Syrian Civil War. Thus, many Iraqi Kurds immigrated to Canada due to the constant wars and suppression of Kurds and Shiites by the Iraqi government.

=== Oceania ===
In Australia, Kurdish migrants first arrived in the second half of the 1960s, mainly from Turkey. However, in the late 1970s families from Syria and Lebanon were also present in Australia. Since the second half of the 1980s, the majority of Kurds arriving in Australia have been from Iraq and Iran; many of them were accepted under the Humanitarian Programme. However, Kurds from Lebanon, Armenia and Georgia have also migrated to Australia. The majority live in Melbourne and Sydney.

=== Japan ===
The Japanese government has not granted refugee status. While 3,415 Kurds have so far applied for refugee status, none have yet received it.

=== Indonesia ===
In Indonesia, most Kurds are currently migrant refugees, both illegal and documented, as well as asylum seekers. Most of the refugees were placed in Jakarta or in the Puncak area, on the border between Bogor and Cianjur. Between 1999 and 2001, the number was estimated at around 4,800 including other Iraqi migrant refugees.

== Statistics by country ==
European countries which have official statistics on their Kurdish population. Dark green: Ethnicity statistics Cyan: First language statistics Light green: Other official measures

=== Autochthonous community ===
Country	Official figures or estimates	Official figures in %	Further information
Turkey	13,200,000 (1993 MRGI estimate); 14,700,000 (2017 CFR estimate)	—N/a	Kurds in Turkey
Iran	6,100,000 (1993 MRGI estimate); 8,100,000 (2017 CFR estimate)	—N/a	Kurds in Iran
Iraq	4,400,000 (1993 MRGI estimate); 5,450,000 (2015 EPRS estimate)	—N/a	Kurds in Iraq
Syria	1,100,000 (1993 MRGI estimate); 2,500,000 (2011 MRGI estimate)	—N/a	Kurds in Syria

=== Transcaucasus ===
Country	Official figures	Official figures in %	Further information
Armenia	56,127 (1989 census); 37,470 (2011 census)^{d} 32,742 (2021 census)	1.7% 1.2% 1.1%	Kurds in Armenia: Provinces / (2011); Armavir Province / 17,063; Aragatsotn Province / 7,090; Ararat Province / 5,001; Yerevan / 3,361; Kotayk Province / 3,305; Shirak Province / 763; Lori Province / 663; Gegharkunik Province / 144; Tavush Province / 44; Syunik Province / 26; Vayots Dzor Province / 10
Azerbaijan	41,193 (1926 census); 6,065 (2009 census)^{b}	1.8% 0.1%	Kurds in Azerbaijan: Administrative Divisions / (2009); Lachin District / 1,194; Nakhchivan Autonomous Republic / 1,321; Samukh District / 753; Khachmaz District / 603; Ismailli District / 498; Yevlakh District / 210; Baku / 185; Goranboy District / 102; Qazakh District / 100; Agstafa District / 68; Kalbajar District / 38; Goygol District / 34; Ganja / 31; Absheron District / 27; Tartar District / 27; Shaki District / 26; Shamkir District / 22; Oghuz District / 21; Aghjabadi District / 18; Lankaran District / 14; Zangilan District / 14; Salyan District / 9; Sumqayit / 9; Dashkasan District / 8; Mingachevir / 7; Shusha District / 3; Gadabay District / 1
Georgia	33,331 (1989 census); 20,843 (2002 census); 13,770 (2014 census)	0.6% 0.5% 0.4%	Kurds in Georgia: Administrative divisions / (2014); Tbilisi / 12,570; Kakheti / 528; Kvemo Kartli / 453; Adjara / 81; Mtskheta-Mtianeti / 74; Guria / 17; Imereti / 6; Shida Kartli / 4; Samegrelo-Zemo Svaneti / 1; Samtskhe-Javakheti / 1
Artsakh	16 (2015 census, ethnicity); 38 (2015 census, mother tongue)	0%	
Abkhazia	29 (1989 census)	0%	
South Ossetia	2 (1989 census); 1 (2015 census)	0% 0%	

=== Europe ===
Country	Official figures or estimates	Official figures in %	Further information
Germany	500,000 (1993 KIP estimate); 850,000 (2016 KIP estimate); 1,200,000 (2023 KIP estimate)	—N/a	Kurds in Germany
France	60,000 (1993 KIP estimate); 230,000 (2016 KIP estimate); 320,000 (2023 KIP estimate)	—N/a	Kurds in France
Netherlands	30,000 (1993 KIP estimate); 100,000 (2016 KIP estimate); 120,000 (2023 KIP estimate)	—N/a	Kurds in the Netherlands
Sweden	15,000 (1993 KIP estimate); 85,000 (2016 KIP estimate); 120,000 (2023 KIP estimate)	—N/a	Kurds in Sweden
Russia	50,701 (2021 census)	0%	Kurds in Russia
Austria	25,000 (1993 KIP estimate); 80,000 (2016 KIP estimate); 85,000 (2023 KIP estimate)	—N/a	2,133 (2001 census, Kurdish speakers)
Belgium	12,000 (1993 KIP estimate); 70,000 (2016 KIP estimate); 90,000 (2023 KIP estimate)	—N/a	Kurds in Belgium
United Kingdom	93,947 (2021–2022 censuses); 66,677 (2021 census, Kurdish speakers, excludes Scotland)	—	Kurds in the United Kingdom
Greece	1,000 (1993 KIP estimate); 40,000 (2016 KIP estimate); 40,000 (2023 KIP estimate)	—N/a	Kurds in Greece
Norway	2,000 (1993 KIP estimate); 25,000 (2016 KIP estimate); 30,000 (2023 KIP estimate)	—N/a	7,100 (2013 official estimate, Kurdish speakers); Kurds in Norway
Denmark	12,000 (1993 KIP estimate); 25,000 (2016 KIP estimate); 25,000 (2023 KIP estimate)	—N/a	Kurds in Denmark
Italy	25,000 (2016 KIP estimate); 25,000 (2023 KIP estimate)	—N/a	–
Switzerland	14,699 (2012 statistics, Kurdish speakers); 19,401 (2015 statistics, Kurdish speakers); 90,000 (2023 KIP estimate)	0.2% 0.3%	Kurds in Switzerland
Finland	4,340 (2003 annual statistics, Kurdish speakers); 17,270 (2023 annual statistics, Kurdish speakers)	0.1% 0.3%	Kurds in Finland
Romania	3,000 (2006 estimate)	—N/a	Kurds in Romania
Ukraine	2,088 (2001 census); 302 (2014 Crimean census)	0%	Kurds in Ukraine: Oblasts / (2001); Luhansk Oblast / 470; Crimea / 394; Kherson Oblast / 296; Kyiv / 199; Odesa Oblast / 132; Mykolaiv Oblast / 119; Dnipropetrovsk Oblast / 116; Zaporizhia Oblast / 84; Kirovohrad Oblast / 68; Kharkiv Oblast / 46; Kyiv Oblast / 40; Donetsk Oblast / 36; Khmelnytskyi Oblast / 19; Cherkasy Oblast / 15; Ivano-Frankivsk Oblast / 11; Vinnytsia Oblast / 10; Lviv Oblast / 7; Ternopil Oblast / 7; Chernihiv Oblast / 6; Zhytomyr Oblast / 4; Sevastopol / 3; Poltava Oblast / 2; Rivne Oblast / 2; Sumy Oblast / 2
Cyprus	1,500 (2006 estimate)	—N/a	
Spain	1,500 (2012 estimate)	—N/a	
Ireland	818 (2016 census, Kurdish speakers); 1,484 (2022 census, Kurdish speakers)	0%	
Luxembourg	307 (2021 statistics, Kurdish speakers)		
Poland	224 (2011 census); 398 (2021 census)	0%	—
Hungary	291 (2001 census); 149 (2011 census)	0%	—
Moldova	130 (2017 statistics)	0%	—
Belarus	126 (2009 census); 57 (2019 census, Kurdish speakers)	0%	—
Latvia	17 (2023 statistics)	0%	—
Bulgaria	128 (1992 census); 147 (2001 census); 105 (2011 census)	0%	—
Czech Republic	222 (2021 census)	0%	—
Bosnia and Herzegovina	28 (2013 census)	0%	—
Estonia	23 (2011 census); 50 (2021 census)	0%	—
Serbia	<12 (2011 census)	0%	—
Lithuania	5 (2001 census); 25 (2010 asylum seekers by ethnicity); 29 (2011 asylum seekers by ethnicity); 8 (2012 asylum seekers by ethnicity); 3 (2013 asylum seekers by ethnicity)	0%	—
Croatia	8 (2011 census)	0%	—

=== Middle East ===
Country	Est. population	Further information
Lebanon	approx. 294,000 (2017 estimate)	Kurds in Lebanon
Israel	approx. 200,000 (Jews from Kurdistan)	Kurds in Israel
Bahrain	approx. 44,600	—
Jordan	approx. 30,000 (2012 estimate)	Kurds in Jordan
Kuwait	approx. 5,000 (1991 estimate)	—

=== Asia ===
Country	Official figures	Official figures in %	Est. population	Further information
Kazakhstan	50,279 (2024 annual statistics)	0.3%	—	Kurds in Kazakhstan
Kyrgyzstan	13,171 (2009 census)	0.2%	—	Regions / (2009); Talas Region / 5,547; Chüy Region / 4,544; Jalal-Abad Region / 1,902; Bishkek city / 489; Osh Region / 287; Osh city / 203; Batken Region / 194; Naryn Region / Not stated; Issyk-Kul Region / Not stated
Turkmenistan	4,387 (1989 census); 6,097 (1995 census)	0.1%	—	Kurds in Turkmenistan: Regions / (1989); Districts of Republican Subordination / 2,272; Ashgabat / 1,480; Mary Region / 570; Daşoguz Region / 36; Lebap Region / 29
Afghanistan	—N/a	—N/a	approx. 2,670	—
Uzbekistan	1,839 (1989 census)	0%	—	—
South Korea	—N/a	—N/a	approx. 1,000	—
Japan	—N/a	—N/a	approx. 2,000	Kurds in Japan
Pakistan	—N/a	—N/a	approx. 240	Kurds in Pakistan
Tajikistan	7 (2010 census)	0%	—	—

=== Americas and Oceania ===
Country	Official figures	Official figures in %	Further information
United States	28,152 (2016–2021 ACS)	0%	Kurds in the United States
Canada	23,130 (2021 census); 19,185 (2021 census, Kurdish speakers)	0.1%	Kurds in Canada
Australia	10,171 (2021 census); 9,893 (2021 census, Kurdish speakers)	0% 0%	
New Zealand	927 (2018 census)	0%	

Notes
^b Official Azerbaijani records claim only 6,065 Kurds in 2009, while Kurdish leaders estimate as much as 200,000. The problem is that the historical record of the Kurds in Azerbaijan is filled with lacunae. For instance, in 1979 there was according to the census no Kurds recorded. Not only did Turkey and Azerbaijan pursue an identical policy against the Kurds, they even employed identical techniques like forced assimilation, manipulation of population figures, settlement of non-Kurds in areas predominantly Kurdish, suppression of publications and abolition of Kurdish as a medium of instruction in schools.
^c In the 2010 Russian Census, 23,232 people indicated Kurdish (Курды) as their ethnicity, while 40,586 chose Yazidi (Езиды) as their ethnicity.
^d In the 2011 Armenian Census, 2,131 people indicated Kurdish (Քրդեր) as their ethnicity, while 35,272 indicated Yazidi (Եզդիներ) as their ethnicity.

== See also ==
- A Modern History of the Kurds, by David McDowall
- Kurdification

== Bibliography ==
- Ammann, Birgit (2005), "Kurds in Germany", in Ember, Melvin; Ember, Carol R.; Skoggard, Ian (eds.), Encyclopedia of Diasporas: Immigrant and Refugee Cultures Around the World. Diaspora Communities, Volume 2, Springer Publishers, ISBN 0-306-48321-1.
- Baser, Bahar.“Kurdish Diaspora Political Activism in Europe with a Particular Focus on Great Britain.”, Diaspora Dialogues for Development and Peace Project, Berlin: Berghof Peace Support, June 2011.
- Berry, John W. (2006), Immigrant youth in cultural transition: acculturation, identity, and adaptation across national contexts, Routledge, ISBN 0-8058-5156-9.
- Fadloullah, Abdellatif (1994), "Migratory flows from the countries of the South to Western Europe", in De Azevedo, Raimondo Cagiano (ed.), Migration and Development Co-operation, Council of Europe, ISBN 92-871-2611-9.
- Gunter, Michael M. (1997), The Kurds and the future of Turkey, Palgrave Macmillan, ISBN 0-312-17265-6.
- Issa, Tözün (2005), Talking Turkey: the language, culture and identity of Turkish speaking children in Britain, Trentham Books, ISBN 1-85856-318-6.
- Jupp, James (2001), The Australian people: an encyclopedia of the nation, its people and their origins, Cambridge University Press, ISBN 0-521-80789-1.
- Kelley, Ron; Friedlander, Jonathan; Colby, Anita (1993), Irangeles: Iranians in Los Angeles, University of California Press, ISBN 0-520-08008-4.
- Koslowski, Rey (2000), Migrants and Citizens: Demographic Change in the European State System, Cornell University Press, ISBN 0-8014-3714-8.
- McDowall, David (2000), A modern history of the Kurds, I.B.Tauris, ISBN 1-85043-416-6.
- Miller, Mark J. (2000), "A durable international migration and security nexus: the problem of the Islamic periphery in transatlantic ties", in Graham, David T.; Poku, Nana (eds.), Migration, Globalisation, and Human Security, Routledge Publishers, ISBN 0-415-18436-3.
- Powell, John (2005), Encyclopedia of North American Immigration, Infobase Publishing, ISBN 0-8160-4658-1.
- Safran, William (2009), "The Diaspora and the Homeland: Reciprocities, Transformations, and Role Reversals", in Rafael, Eliezer Ben; Sternberg, Yitzak (eds.), Transnationalism: Diasporas and the Advent of a New (dis)order, BRILL, ISBN 978-90-04-17470-2.
- Wahlbeck, Osten (2005), "Kurds in Finland", in Ember, Melvin; Ember, Carol R.; Skoggard, Ian (eds.), Encyclopedia of Diasporas: Immigrant and Refugee Cultures Around the World. Diaspora Communities, Volume 2, Springer Publishers, ISBN 0-306-48321-1.
