= Kurds in Finland =

Kurdit Suomessa / Suomen kurdilaiset

Total population
- 18,460 Kurdish speakers (2025)

Regions with significant populations
- Helsinki, Turku and Tampere regions & Lahti and Jyväskylä

Languages
- Finnish and Kurdish

Religion
- Sunni Islam, Christianity, Yazidism

Related ethnic groups
- Iranian peoples

Kurds in Finland (Finnish: Suomen kurdit; Kurdish: Kurdên Fînlendayê) are a linguistic and ethnic minority in Finland. As of 2025, there were 18,460 Kurdish-speaking people in Finland.

== History ==
Kurds started first arriving to Finland in the 1970s and 1980s. In 1995 there were 1,166 Turkish citizens in Finland, out of which around 300-550 were Kurds. A significant portion of the Turkish pizzerias and kebab-restaurants in Finland are established by Kurds, some Kurds work at the airports in Finland. While others come to Finland for studying, or work in IT companies.

Some of the Finnish Kurds originate from Turkey and Iran, but most of them have come from Kurdistan region of Iraq, where they started arriving from in the 1990s as UNHCR quota refugees. Kurds make up the majority of Iraqi immigrants to Finland. After ISIL gained ground against the Peshmerga in Iraqi Kurdistan the Finnish Kurds organized protests against ISIL. According to the chairman of Finnish-Kurdish friendship association several dozens of Finnish Kurds had left to Syria and Iraq in order to fight against ISIL.

== Culture ==
Finnish Kurds speak several different dialects of Kurdish, the largest of which are Sorani and Kurmanji Kurdish. Kurmanji has more speakers worldwide, but Sorani is the most spoken Kurdish dialect in Finland. It is likely that there are more ethnic Kurds than there are those who speak it as a first language. For example, some of the Kurds who originate from Turkey speak Turkish rather than Kurdish. There are several different Kurdish organizations in Finland, many of which have direct or indirect connections to political parties in Iraqi Kurdistan.

Most Finnish Kurds are Muslims, some are atheists or non-practicing Muslims.

Different Kurdish organizations in Finland host their own Nowruz (Kurdish new year) celebrations.

== Organizations ==
There are several Kurdish organizations in Finland, including Kurdiliitto and Suomalais-Kurdilainen ystävyysseura.

== Political activism ==
In October 2019, thousands of Finnish Kurds staged a protest in Helsinki over Turkey's military operation in Syria. On 26 August 2022, Kurds living in Finland held a demonstration in Helsinki to protest the NATO agreement with Finland, Sweden and Turkey and the trilateral memorandum meeting of Finland, Sweden and Turkey. As in May 2022 Finland made an accession bid to join NATO, Turkey demanded that Finland end its support to the Kurdistan Workers' Party (PKK) and People's Defense Units (YPG).

== Demographics ==
Historical population
Year	Pop.	±% p.a.
1990	179	—
1995	1,381	+50.48%
2000	3,115	+17.67%
2005	5,123	+10.46%
2010	8,032	+9.41%
2015	11,271	+7.01%
2020	15,368	+6.40%
2025	18,460	+3.73%
Kurdish speakers. Source: Statistics Finland

People with Kurdish as mother tongue living in Finland according to Statistics Finland.

Kurdish speakers by municipality (2024)
Municipality	Population
Whole country	17,953
Helsinki	4,265
Turku	2,403
Espoo	2,350
Vantaa	2,246
Tampere	818
Lahti	777
Jyväskylä	437
Oulu	370
Salo	340
Vaasa	221
Lieto	145
Raisio	144
Kerava	136
Kotka	128
Porvoo	115
Raseborg	111
Hämeenlinna	110
Seinäjoki	108
Kaarina	104
Kouvola	104
Nurmijärvi	102
Kuopio	101
Rovaniemi	99
Joensuu	97
Lappeenranta	97
Hyvinkää	91
Lohja	80
Kirkkonummi	77
Pori	71
Imatra	62
Kajaani	62
Kauniainen	62
Sipoo	57
Kokkola	56
Tuusula	54
Varkaus	53
Järvenpää	51
Riihimäki	47
Pietarsaari	45
Vihti	45
Forssa	42
Pirkkala	41
Kangasala	40
Mikkeli	37
Mariehamn	33
Raahe	32
Uusikaupunki	28
Heinola	27
Äänekoski	27
Karkkila	26
Larsmo	25
Hanko	24
Nokia	24
Loimaa	23
Rusko	22
Iisalmi	21
Tornio	21
Rauma	19
Pieksämäki	17
Kemi	16
Lempäälä	16
Mäntsälä	16
Naantali	15
Savonlinna	15
Jomala	14
Kristinestad	14
Pudasjärvi	14
Korsholm	13
Ylöjärvi	13
Kokemäki	12
Laukaa	12
Loviisa	12
Sastamala	12
Outokumpu	11
Kankaanpää	10
Orimattila	10

== Notable people ==
- Helly Luv, a singer and dancer
- Makwan Amirkhani, a mixed martial artist
- Milan Jaff, a convicted criminal and gang leader
- Aram Hasanzada, a footballer

== See also ==
- Kurdish diaspora
- Immigration to Finland
- Kurds in Sweden
