= 1933 Iraqi parliamentary election =

- 8 February 1933

All 88 seats in the Chamber of Deputies 45 seats needed for a majority
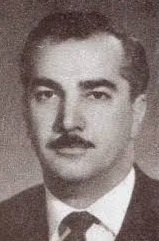

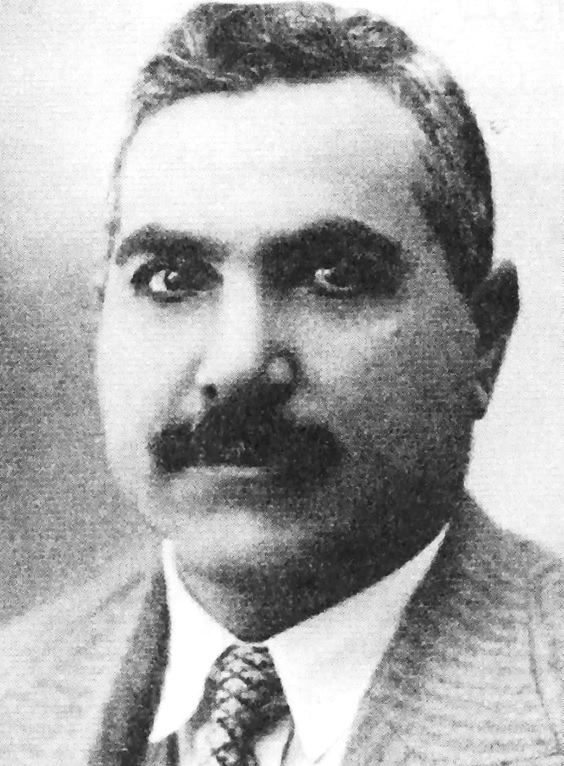
	First party	Second party
Leader	Naji Shawkat	Yasin al-Hashimi
Party	Government Bloc	HIW & allies
Last election	–	13 (Note: As People's Party)
Seats won	72	16
Seat change	New	▲3
PM before election
Naji Shawkat
Subsequent PM
Rashid Ali al-Gaylani
HIW

Parliamentary elections were held in Iraq in 1933 to elect the members of the Chamber of Deputies. Although the Government Bloc led by incumbent Prime Minister Naji Shawkat won the most seats, it quickly disintegrated after the elections, allowing Rashid Ali al-Gaylani to become prime minister.

== Background ==
Prime Minister Nuri al-Said submitted his resignation to King Faisal on 27 October 1932. The resignation was accepted on the following day. Faisal selected Naji Shawkat to form a new government on 3 November 1932. Although the resignation of al-Said was supposedly at his own behest, it was Faisal who had requested his resignation. He wished to reduce the influence of al-Said, who had established good relationships with the British government after signing the Anglo-Iraqi Treaty of 1930, as well as gaining support from the moderate opposition which opposed the treaty.

The government of Shawkat was seen as a compromise government that would achieve a balance between pro-British policies and opposition demands, and clear the political congestion caused by the signing the 1930 treaty. The new government sought to dissolve parliament (in which al-Said retained a majority) to calm the general public and limit al-Said's influence.

Al-Said tried to dissuade Naji Shawkat from dissolving parliament by promising his party's support for the Shawkat government. However, Faisal and the new prime minister were determined to press ahead and a royal decree was issued for that purpose on 8 November 1932. Al-Said tried to block the decision by instructing his party's deputies not to attend the parliamentary session in which the royal decree was to be announced, but that was not able to prevent the government and Faisal from proceeding in dissolving parliament on 8 October.

Al-Said subsequently held a meeting with his party's leadership on 10 October. The leadership issued a statement denouncing the dissolution and decided to send a memorandum to Faisal, claiming that the dissolution was illegitimate. Faisal tried to keep al-Said away from Iraq by appointing him as the country's representative to the League of Nations on 16 November 1932.

Shawkat's government had four months from the date of parliament's dissolution to hold new elections in accordance with article 40 of the constitution. Therefore, the government selected 10 December 1932 as the date for electing the secondary voters that would elect the new parliament deputies early in 1933.

== Results ==
Shawkat's government did not have a formal party, but endorsed a list of independent candidates that came to be known as the "government bloc". This bloc won 72 of the 88 seats, however this majority did not hold as the bloc began to disintegrate after the parliament convened on 8 March 1933. The National Brotherhood Party led by Yasin al-Hashimi and Rashid Ali al-Gaylani and members of the Iraqi National Party, led by Jafar Abu al-Temman participated in the elections as an opposition alliance, winning a minority of seats. Al-Said's Covenant party faded away.

== Aftermath ==
After the elections, Shawkat tried to expand his government by including elements from the moderate opposition such as al-Hashimi and Hikmat Sulayman. However, he failed to do so as the opposition started to grow, and his parliamentary bloc started to disintegrate. He submitted his resignation to Faisal on 18 March 1933, which was accepted. Faisal subsequently chose al-Gaylani on 20 March to form a new government.

Shawkat's government decision to endorse a group of independent "Government Bloc" candidates rather than having a formal party began a new tradition in Iraqi politics. The government would rely on their support to stay in power and pass laws. However, there were no guarantees that these candidates would stay loyal to the government after elections. Subsequently, it was common for the deputies to change their political affiliation from one party to another, or move from pro-government to opposition and vice versa.
