= 1935 Iraqi parliamentary election =

Parliamentary elections were held in Iraq on 4 August 1935 to elect the members of the Chamber of Deputies.

== Background ==
The elections occurred during a period of turmoil and tribal revolts against the government in the mid-Euphrates and southern regions. The revolt was partly attributed to the lack of governmental and parliamentary representation of the Shia tribes in the troubled regions.

== Results ==
The number of seats in parliament was increased from 88 to 108 due to the significant increase in the population since 1925. The government recognised the southern tribes' resentment and helped electing some of the tribes' leaders. The new parliament also had a higher number of journalists. The Party of National Brotherhood led by incumbent Prime Minister Yasin al-Hashimi won a majority of seats.

== Aftermath ==
Al-Hashimi, who adopted strong nationalist policies, had strong support in the new parliament; he remained Prime Minister until his government was overthrown by a military coup led by general Bakr Sidqi in 1936. After the coup, Hikmat Sulayman, a former member of the Party of National Brotherhood, was made Prime Minister by the coup's military leader.
