= 1934 Iraqi parliamentary election =

- 6 December 1934

All 88 seats in the Chamber of Deputies 45 seats needed for a majority
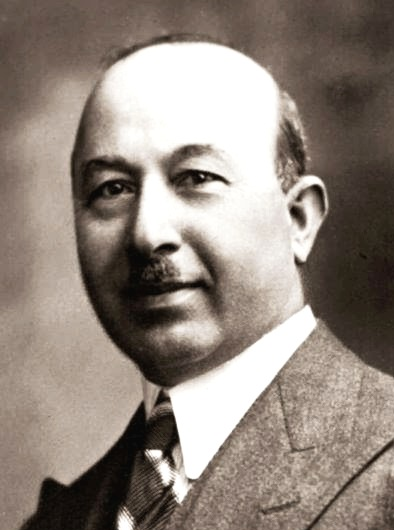

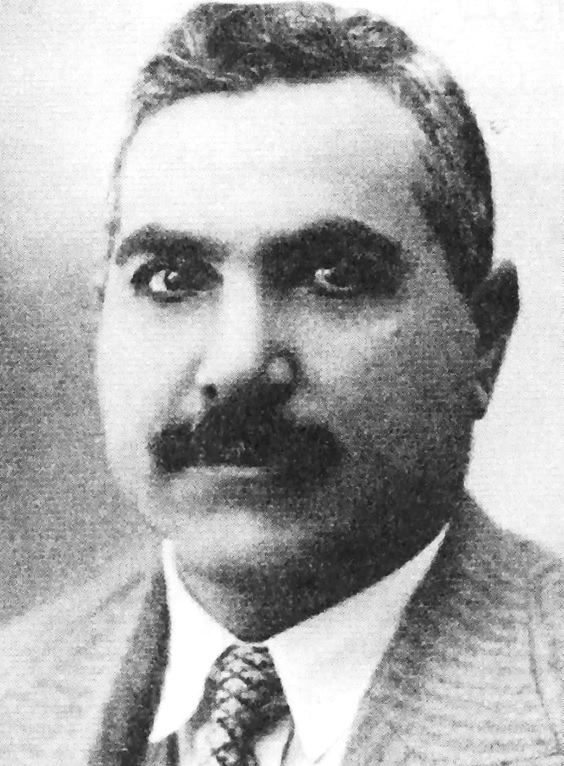
	First party	Second party
Leader	Ali Jawdat al-Aiyubi	Yasin al-Hashimi
Party	National Unity	HIW
Last election	–	16
Seats won	76	12
Seat change	New	▼4
PM before election
Ali Jawdat al-Aiyubi
National Unity
Subsequent PM
Ali Jawdat al-Aiyubi
National Unity

Parliamentary elections were held in Iraq on 6 December 1934 to elect the members of the Chamber of Deputies.

== Background ==
After the death of King Faisal I, his son Ghazi was crowned as King in September 1933. Ghazi dissolved Parliament on 27 August 1934.

== Results ==
The elections resulted in the pro-government National Unity Party led by Prime Minister Ali Jawdat al-Aiyubi winning a majority of seats. The opposition and press claimed that the government heavily had intervened in the elections.

== Aftermath ==
The new parliament lasted only for few months and was dissolved on 9 April 1935 and fresh elections were held later in the year.
