= Muhammed Sharif al-Faruqi =

Lieutenant Muhammed Sharif al-Faruqi (1891 - 1920; Arabic: محمد شريف الفاروقي) was an Arab Ottoman staff officer from Mosul. He was stationed in Damascus and played a pivotal role in the events leading up to the Arab Revolt.

He was a member of Arab secret societies in Damascus. After the first visit of Faisal bin Hussein to Damascus in early 1915, the societies were suspected by Djemal Pasha of conspiracy and treason against the Ottoman Empire. As a consequence the societies were disbanded and their members dispersed. Al-Faruqi was arrested and sent to the First Army in Istanbul and sent to the Gallipoli front but he defected to the British on 20 August 1915 after spending only 10 days in his unit.

He crossed over to the Allied side and claimed to have important information for the British. The British eagerly jumped on the source of information. Al-Faruqi's poor English made accidental or intentional misunderstandings likely. The information he fed the British was partly true and partly fabricated. Al-Faruqi was a member of the secret society al-'Ahd, the anti-Ottoman Arab nationalist organisation founded and headed by Aziz Al-Masri, then based in Cairo, and claimed he represented the Arab army officers in Damascus, whereas in reality Yasin al-Hashimi was the leader of the Damascus al-Ahd's antenna. He urged the British to support an independent Arab state as outlined in the Damascus Protocol during the correspondence with Hussein. He claimed any delay would make Hussein fully support Germany and the Ottomans.

Al-Faruqi's claims solidified British Egypt's conceptions that the Arab world was ready for a revolt. Kitchener's followers in Egypt and elsewhere used this information to persuade Henry McMahon to meet Hussein's demands. An Arab revolt would relieve in part the British forces fighting the Ottomans. In the following negotiations concerning this issue al-Faruqi managed to be the centrepiece by claiming to each party to represent an opportune other party.

Faruqi was killed on a road in Iraq in 1920 during a tribal raid.
