= Senate of Iraq =

Former upper house of the Parliament of Iraq

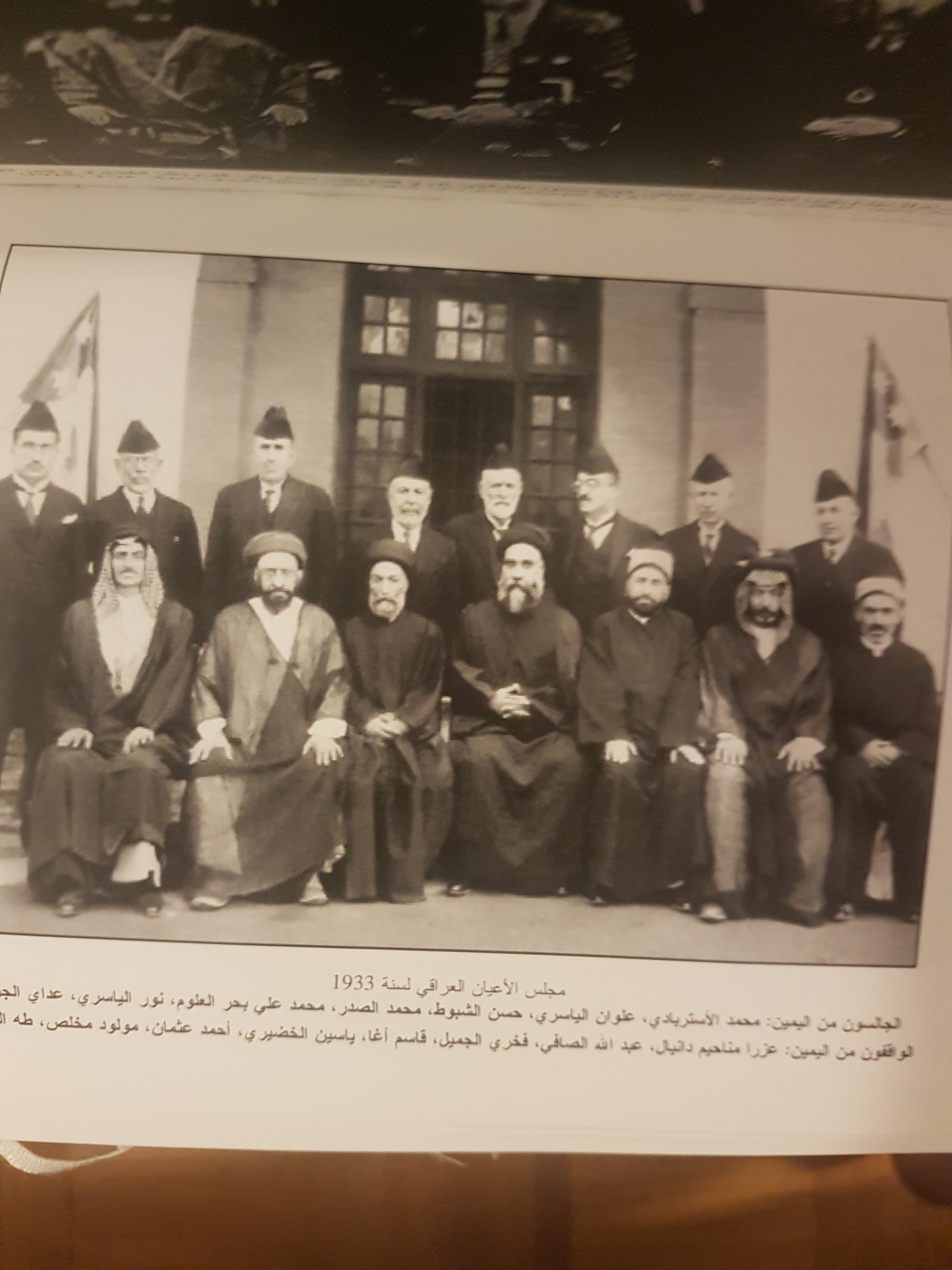
Iraqi Senators in 1933

The Senate of Iraq (Arabic: مجلس الاعيان; Majlis al-A`yan) was the unelected upper house of the bicameral parliament established by the Mandatory Iraq's 1925 constitution. There were around twenty Senators, appointed for eight years by the King of Iraq. The Senate remained in existence until the 1958 revolution.

== Presidents of the Senate ==
Name	Took office	Left office	Notes
Yusuf al-Suwaydi	July 1925	2 November 1929	
Mohammad Al-Sadr	2 November 1929	February 1937	
Muhammed Ridha al-Shabibi	27 February 1937	August 1937	
Mohammad Al-Sadr	December 1937	December 1943	
Jamil Al-Madfai	December 1943	December 1944	
Salih Bashayan	December 1944	December 1945	
Nuri Al-Said	December 1945	21 November 1946	
Mohammad Al-Sadr	June 1948	1948	
Nuri Al-Said	1948	6 January 1949	
Jamil Al-Madfai	? - 1952	January 1953	
Jamil Al-Madfai	September 1953	1957 - ?	
Abdul Hadi Chalabi	? - 1958	14 July 1958	

== Members ==
Members of the Iraqi Senate included:

- Menahem Saleh Daniel. Appointed 1925, representing Iraqi Jews. Remained member until 1932, when he was succeeded by his son.
- Jamil Sidqi al-Zahawi. Appointed 1925, remained member until 1929.
- Mawlud Mukhlis. Appointed 1925. Appointed vice-president of the Senate in 1936, though resigned in 1937 when he was elected Baghdad deputy to Parliament. He later returned to the Senate.
- Muhammad al-Sadr. Appointed 1925, remaining until his death in 1956. President of the Senate from 1929 until 1944, with the exception of 1937.
- Yousef VI Emmanuel II Thomas. Appointed 1925, representing the Chaldean Catholic Church. Remained member until his death in 1947, when he was succeeded by Yousef VII Ghanima.
- Rustum Haydar, appointed 1931.
- Ezra Menachem Daniel (1874-1952). Appointed member 1932, replacing his father; remained on the Senate until his death in 1952.
- Abdul Hadi Chalabi, appointed 1947.
- Ali Jawdat al-Aiyubi, appointed 1948–9.
- Tawfiq Wahbi.
- Nureddin Mahmud, member from January 1953 to 1958.
- Sheikh Ahmad A. Yaseen AlAmer, appointed Mayor of Basra and Al Zubair province and Member of Parliament from 1945 to 1950|

== See also ==
- Kingdom of Iraq
- Chamber of Deputies of Iraq
