= Iraqi Intifada =

Series of national strikes and protests

- Date: 23 August - 23 November 1952
- Location: Basra, Kingdom of Iraq

Parties
Hashemite Kingdom of Iraq	Protesters

Lead figures
(Kingdom of Iraq) King Faisal II	no centralized leadership

The Iraqi Intifada (Arabic: انتفاضة العراق) was a series of national strikes and violent protests in 1952 against the ruling Hashemite monarchy and the Anglo-Iraqi Treaty. Inspired by that year's Egyptian Revolution and the previous year's Iranian Prime Minister Mohammad Mosaddegh's nationalization of oil, the revolutionaries wanted to force King Faisal II's abdication, transform the state into a republic and assert Iraq's full independence from Britain by assuming control over its own foreign affairs.

Port workers in Basra went on strike on 23 August 1952. Students at Iraq's College of Pharmacy followed suit on 26 October. The Iraqi Communist Party, which had been behind the 1948 Al-Wathbah uprising, played a leading role in the disturbances. Though the protesters were emphatically anti-monarchical, they were positively disposed to the military, a symbol of national unity and Iraqi independence.

Faisal II's uncle, ruling Regent 'Abd al-Ilah, replaced Mustafa Mahmud al-Umari with General Nureddin Mahmud on 23 November but made no concessions to the protesters. Protesters denounced Mahmud and demanded his resignation in favour the National Democratic Party's Kamil al-Chadirchi, who had briefly served as Bakr Sidqi's Economic Minister after the 1936 revolution. Mahmud cracked down, instituted martial law and a curfew, shut down political parties and newspapers and detained leading protesters. In 1953, Jamil al-Midfai, a civilian politician, was elected to succeed Mahmud. In May, Faisal II became an adult and assumed the role and responsibilities of the king.

In 1958, Iraqi Army officers overthrew the monarchy in a coup d'état and murdered the royal family.
