= Mawlud Mukhlis =

19th President of the Chamber of Deputies of Hashemite Iraq

- مولود مخلص

Governor of Zor
- In office 1919–1920
- Monarch: Faisal I

Governor of Karbala
- In office 1923–1923
- Monarch: Faisal I

Personal details
- Born: Mawlud Mukhlis al-Tikriti; 1886 Mosul, Ottoman Iraq
- Died: 1951 (aged 64–65) Beirut, Lebanon

Military service
- Allegiance: Ottoman Empire (1914–1916); Kingdom of Hejaz (1916–1918); Kingdom of Syria (1918–1920); Kingdom of Iraq (1920–1951)
- Battles/wars: World War I; Mesopotamian campaign; Battle of Shaiba (1915); Siege of Kut (1916); Arab Revolt; Battle of Wadi Musa (1917); Iraqi Revolt

Mawlud Mukhlis al-Tikriti (Arabic: مولود مخلص التكريتي; 1886 – 1951) was an Arab nationalist, soldier and Iraqi politician. He headed the Chamber of Deputies of Iraq from December 1937 to November 1941.

== Biography ==
Mukhlis joined the Covenant Society in 1914–15, commanded the Ottoman cavalry at the Battle of Shaiba and the Siege of Kut, and was subsequently arrested by the Ottomans on charges of spying for Britain. After escaping arrest, he joined the Arab Revolt.

He successfully defended Wadi Musa when Turkish forces under the command of Mehmed Djemal Pasha attacked on 21 October 1917, in the Battle of Wadi Musa.

He later became aide-de-camp to Faisal during the Arab Kingdom of Syria period. In 1919–20, he became the governor of occupied Zor.

He participated in the 1920 Iraqi revolt against the British, served as governor of Karbala in 1923, and was appointed to the Senate of Iraq by King Faisal in 1925. He won a seat in the parliament in the 1936–1937 Iraqi parliamentary election, and again in 1939 and 1943.
