= Iraqi Revolution =

Iraqi Revolution may refer to:

- The Iraqi Revolt (1920)
- The Iraqi Intifada (1952)
- The 14 July Revolution (1958)
- The Ramadan Revolution (February 1963)
- The 17 July Revolution (1968)
- The 1991 Iraqi uprisings
