= Occupation of Zor =

1918–1920 Iraqi nationalist occupation of Zor Sanjak

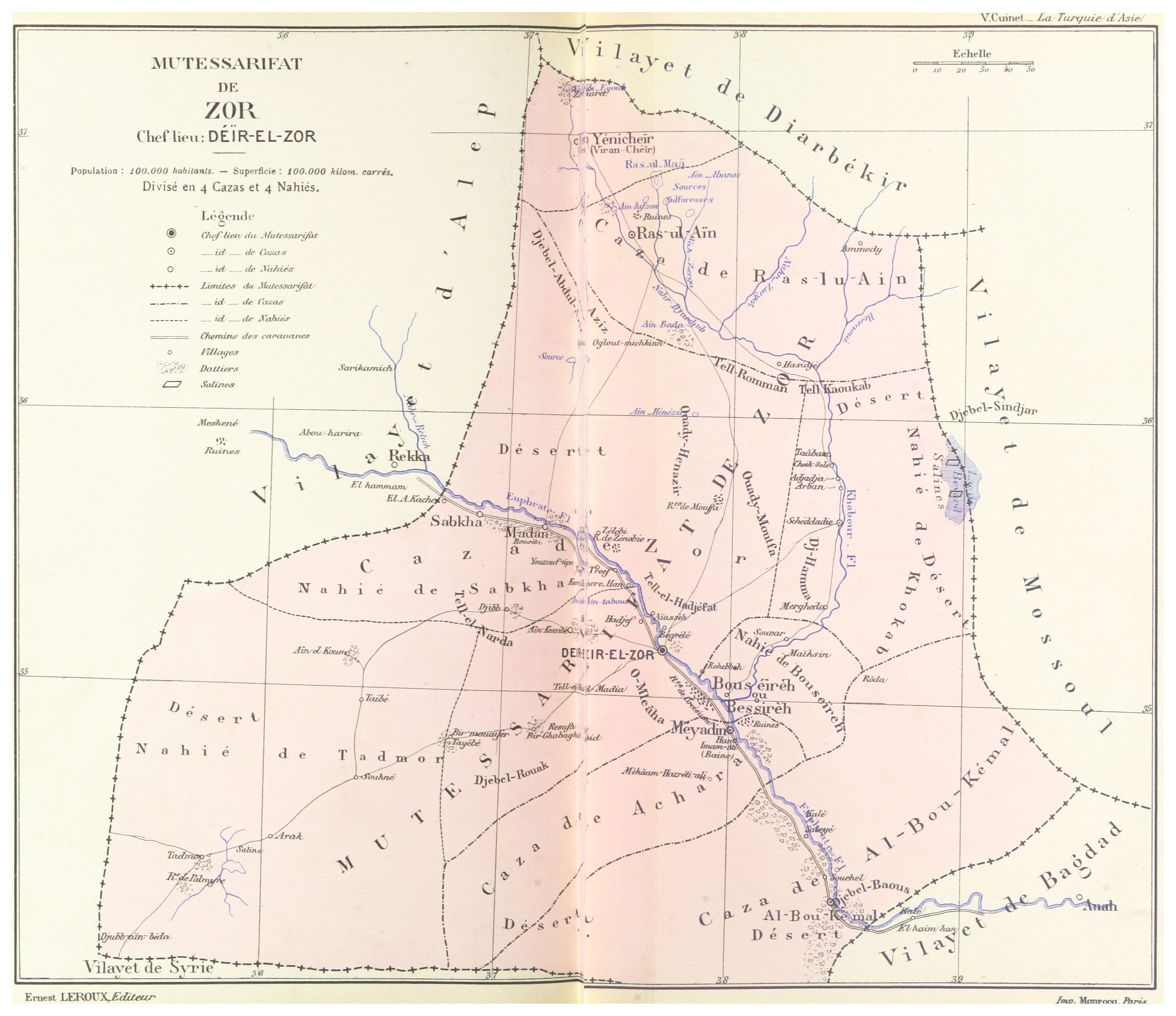
Zor Vilayet in the late 19th century

The Occupation of Zor was the 1918–1920 occupation of the Zor Sanjak in Upper Mesopotamia after World War I by Iraqi nationalists representing the Arab government in Damascus led by Emir Faisal. Contrary to the intentions of the Iraqi nationalists, the occupation ensured that the region became part of the modern state of Syria.

The territory was located between the Occupied Enemy Territory Administration (OETA) in Syria on the West and British-occupied Iraq (1918–1920) on the East.

The governors of occupied Zor were, in order: Mar'i Pasha al-Mallah, Ramadan al-Shallash, and Mawlud Mukhlis; the latter two were members of the Iraqi Covenant Society.

== See also ==
- Haj Fadel Government

== Bibliography ==
- Christian Velud. (1988). Histoire des recherches à Doura-Europos: Contexte historique régional des fouilles de Doura-europos entre les deux Guerres mondiales. Syria, 65(3/4), 363–382. Retrieved from http://www.jstor.org/stable/4198721
- Tauber, Eliezer (1991). "The Struggle for Dayr al-Zur: The Determination of Borders between Syria and Iraq". International Journal of Middle East Studies. 23 (3). Cambridge University Press: 361–385. doi:10.1017/S0020743800056348. JSTOR 164487.
- Gertrude Bell (1920) Review of the civil administration of Mesopotamia, Cmd 1061
- Isaiah Friedman (8 September 2017). British Miscalculations: The Rise of Muslim Nationalism, 1918-1925. Taylor & Francis. ISBN 978-1-351-53067-5.
