= United Popular Front (Iraq) =

United Popular Front الجبهة الشعبية المتحدة
- President: Mohammed Ridha Al-Shabibi
- Founder: Taha al-Hashimi
- Founded: April 1951
- Dissolved: 22 September 1954
- Ideology: Reformism; Iraqi nationalism

The United Popular Front (Arabic: الجبهة الشعبية المتحدة, al-Jabha al-Sha'biya al-Mutahida) was an Iraqi political party. The party was founded in April 1951. The party's first president was the former prime minister Taha al-Hashimi, who was later succeeded in this position by Mohammed Ridha Al-Shabibi, who had been vice president of the party under Hashimi. Other prominent members included Muzahim al-Pachachi, Nasrat al-Farisi, and Abdul al-Razzaq al-Dhahir.

Although the party had officially instructed its members not to stand in the 1953 election, party members went on to win 11 seats in the election. Several of these members went on to serve in the first cabinet of Prime Minister Muhammad Fadhel al-Jamali. The party would go on to lose all but one of its seats in the June 1954 election, although would gain another seat in the September 1954 election.

The party was dissolved on 22 September 1954, ten days after the September election, alongside the Iraqi Independence Party, and the Socialist Nation Party following the implementation of a new law governing legal societies. The parties were claimed by the government to have been encouraging people to rebel against the government, and had been putting party interests over national interests.
