= Aziz Ali al-Misri =

Egyptian military officer (1879–1965)

'Aziz 'Ali al-Misri
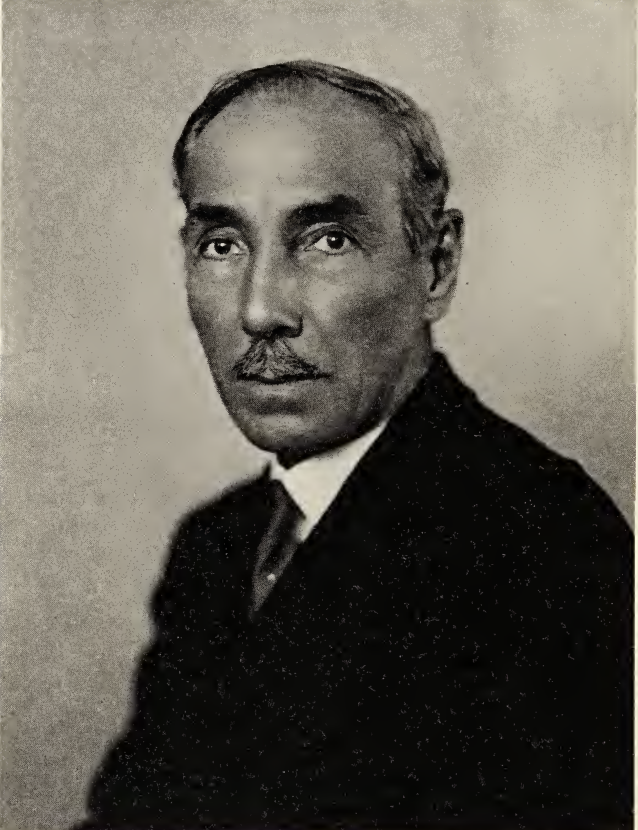
- Born: 1879; Cairo, Khedivate of Egypt
- Died: 15 June 1965 (aged 85–86); Cairo, United Arab Republic
- Occupations: Soldier, politician
- Known for: co-founder of Al-Qahtaniyya and Covenant Society; Arab Revolt
- Political party: Committee of Union and Progress Young Egypt Party

Aziz Ali al-Misri (Note: Adyghe: Азиз-Али Мысри, romanized: Aziz-Ali Mısri; Arabic: عزيز علي المصري, known in Egypt as عبد العزيز زكرياء علي, Abdelaziz Zakaria Ali. The difference in spelling between al-Misri and al-Masri comes from the differences between Modern Standard Arabic and Egyptian colloquial Arabic respectively.) (1879 – 15 June 1965) was an Egyptian Ottoman military officer of Circassian descent, and prominent political activist and member of the Committee of Union and Progress (CUP). During the Second Mashrutiya period, and despite himself not being ethnically Arab, he co-founded and led a number of nationalist Arab societies such as al-Qahtaniyya and al-‘Ahd. After falling out with the CUP, he was arrested in February 1914 and sentenced to death by an Ottoman military court, but British pressure led to his release and pardon by the Sultan, and was subsequently exiled to Egypt. T. E. Lawrence brought him to Hejaz to participate in the Arab Revolt, and praised him as "the most striking and remarkable of the whole Arab movement" and "quick and impetuous, yet self-restrained and self-confident," and praised his bravery and leadership abilities. He later became chief of staff of the Egyptian army in 1939.

== Early life and background ==
Al-Misri was born in Cairo to an Egyptian-Circassian family. His father, Zakariya, and previous relatives on his father’s side of the family were Circassian, with the original family name before having moved to Iraq and then Egypt: Shkhaplhy (Adyghe: Шъхьаплъы, pronounced and written in English Shapli as did his son Omar in the USA). He was conscious of this fact throughout his lifetime. His half sister Aziza (1872-1936), from their common mother Chafika Siouk Mukbel, was the wife of Aly Pasha Youssef Ramzy Zulficar a governor of Cairo. (Note: Their son, Youssef Zulficar Pasha, became the father of Farida first wife of King Farouk)

He graduated from the Tawfiqiyya Secondary School in 1896 and later trained at the Ottoman Military Academy, where he graduated in 1901, and moved onto the Staff College of the Ottoman Army. He was commissioned in the Ottoman army in 1904. He appreciated 19th century German military school. Shortly after, he became an officer in the Ottoman army. His first assignment as a member of the military was in Ottoman Vardar Macedonia. During his stay in the Balkans, al-Misri joined the ranks of the Committee of Union and Progress (CUP), at first a secret organization, more commonly known as the Young Turks. It later became a political group that would eventually take control of the country in 1908.

== Political career ==
=== Early years ===
In the formative constitutional years of the Ottoman Empire, al-Misri remained an advocate for Ottoman unity. He was a political moderate who wanted the main political groups of the time, Ottomanist, pan-Islamism, and Egyptian and Arab nationalism, to exist in cooperation. In 1909, he founded an Arab nationalist secret society, al-Qahtaniyya, whose name was in reference to the Qahtanites, an ancient people who some speculate were the ancestors of the Arabs. In 1911, Al-Masri helped mediate a treaty between the Imam Yahya of Yemen and Izzat Pasha, the commander of the Ottoman campaign.

=== Fallout with the Committee of Union and Progress ===
Al-Misri's mixed ethnic background, combined with his sense of political moderation made him an easy target for the CUP. It also made him a popular hero among the Arab political groups and he was labeled as sympathetic to the cause of Arab nationalists. During the Italian invasion and occupation (1911-1912) of Tripolitana and Cyrenaica (modern Libya) he took a leading part in organising resistance in Benghazi with Suleiman al-Askary as his deputy. He developed the system of using tribal tactics with regular combat tactics; a system he later recommended in the Arab Revolt (1916-1918) cf. below and reference n°9. The staff under the orders of general Enver Bey (to become pasha) also included Mustafa Kemal. Probably the greatest reason for his falling out with the CUP was a clash with Enver Pasha. The roots of this quarrel seem to be a mutual dislike for one another, in particular as Aziz opposed the oppressive attitude of the CUP towards minorities. Arab revolutionaries joined in on al-Misri's admonition of Enver Pasha. "There is no doubt that Aziz Ali Bey has been one of the leading spirits in a group of young Arabs". His personality was abrasive and unyielding, and both the CUP and Arab political groups played on this to their advantage.

In April 1914, al-Misri was arrested and removed from Istanbul by the CUP. Although this was not the direct doing of Enver Pasha, it gave him the impetus to "denounce al-Misri as an Arab revolutionary leader who sough an Arab rebellion, and much to al-Misri’s dismay, it put him in a somewhat different light in the eyes of those working for Turko-Arab collaboration." Al-Misri's arrest coincided with a massive purge of Arab officers in the Turkish army. His trial caused effervescence in Egypt and Syria and the British Ambassador in Constantinople (Sir L. Mallet) intervened with the Porte in his favour. Aziz al-Misri went back to Egypt.

=== Role in the Arab Revolt ===
In 1914 he began working under Sharif Husayn, the Sharif of Mecca. In his Seven Pillars of Wisdom (Chapter viii), T.E. Lawrence recorded that on board ship, en route for Jiddah, Ronald Storrs "turned twice around the decks, sniffed, ‘No one worth talking to’, and sat down in one of the two comfortable armchairs, to begin a discussion of Debussy with Aziz el Masri (in the other). Aziz, the Arab-Circassian ex-colonel in the Turkish Army, now general in the Sherifian Army, was on his way to discuss with the Emir of Mecca the equipment and standing of the Arab regulars he was forming at Rabegh. A few minutes later they had left Debussy, and were depreciating Wagner: Aziz in fluent German, and Storrs in German, French and Arabic."

Aziz al-Misri played a prominent role in the early stages of the Arab Revolt. This was an attempt by Sharif Husayn, with British support suggested among others by Aziz al-Misri, to create an independent Arab state, free from Ottoman control. Using a mix of Bedouin volunteers, Arab officers and Arab Ottoman deserters who wanted to join the Revolt, Al-Masry created, out of this total force of 6,000, three infantry brigades, a mounted brigade, engineering unit, and three different artillery groups made up of a patchwork of varying cannon and heavy caliber machine guns. British and French officers also provided technical military advice, among whom T.E. Lawrence (Lawrence of Arabia). He also introduced Nuri Said to Percy Cox in 1914.

Having understood that France and Great Britain were in fact negotiating spheres of influence in the region, Aziz al-Misri encouraged the Sharif to be more independent. He fell out of touch with Sharif Husayn, came back to Egypt in February 1917 and then travelled to Spain and Germany.

== Later career in Egypt ==
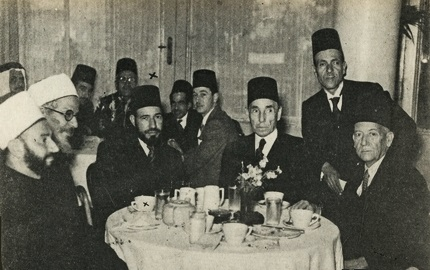
Political and religious figures attending a reception for Mohamed Ali Eltaher at the Continental Hotel in Cairo. From left to right: Shaykh Mohamed Sabri al-Din of Hebron, Shaykh Ibrahim Tfayyesh of Algeria, Muslim Brotherhood Supreme Guide Hassan al-Banna, Egyptian Army Chief of Staff Aziz Pasha al-Masri, Palestinian-Egyptian journalist Mohamed Ali Eltaher and Egyptian government minister Abdel Rahman eal-Rafei

Back to Egypt, Aziz al-Misri married Frances (born Smith) an American and they had a son Omar (1930–2010). From 1927 to 1935, he directed the Cairo Police Academy. By decision of his father King Fouad, the crown prince Farouk, attended (from September 1935 to May 1936) the Royal Military Academy in Woolwich under the guardianship of Aziz Pasha and Ahmed Hassanein Pasha. Aziz Pasha was then a member of the regency council assisting Farouk until the latter became officially King of Egypt in July 1937. In 1938, Aziz al-Misry became inspector general of the Egyptian army. In this capacity he attempted to make the Muslim Brotherhood group part of the Young Egypt Party. His proposal was not endorsed by Hasan Al Banna, leader of the Muslim Brotherhood.

In 1939, Premier Ali Mahir named him chief of staff, but he was dismissed from that post in 1940 at Britain's insistence after incriminating documents were found in his house proving he had had contacts with the Italians in Libya. After he was retired from the Egyptian army, he tried to reach the Axis forces in Iraq whose PM Rashid Ali Kilani had joined Germany, but was caught and put on trial in 1941. Anwar Sadat related in his autobiography that he had a part in this attempt, and that officers from the Egyptian Air Force tried to arrange a plane for Aziz to carry him to Beirut, then under Vichy France, from where he could then travel to Iraq. Aziz al-Misry was released in 1942 among others as he revealed having informed Colonel Cudbert Thornhill (British Special Operations Executive officer) of his flight to reach Iraq. In the cosmopolitan society of Cairo and with his wide culture and religious tolerance, Aziz al-Misri had, in all communities, many acquaintances and some friends.

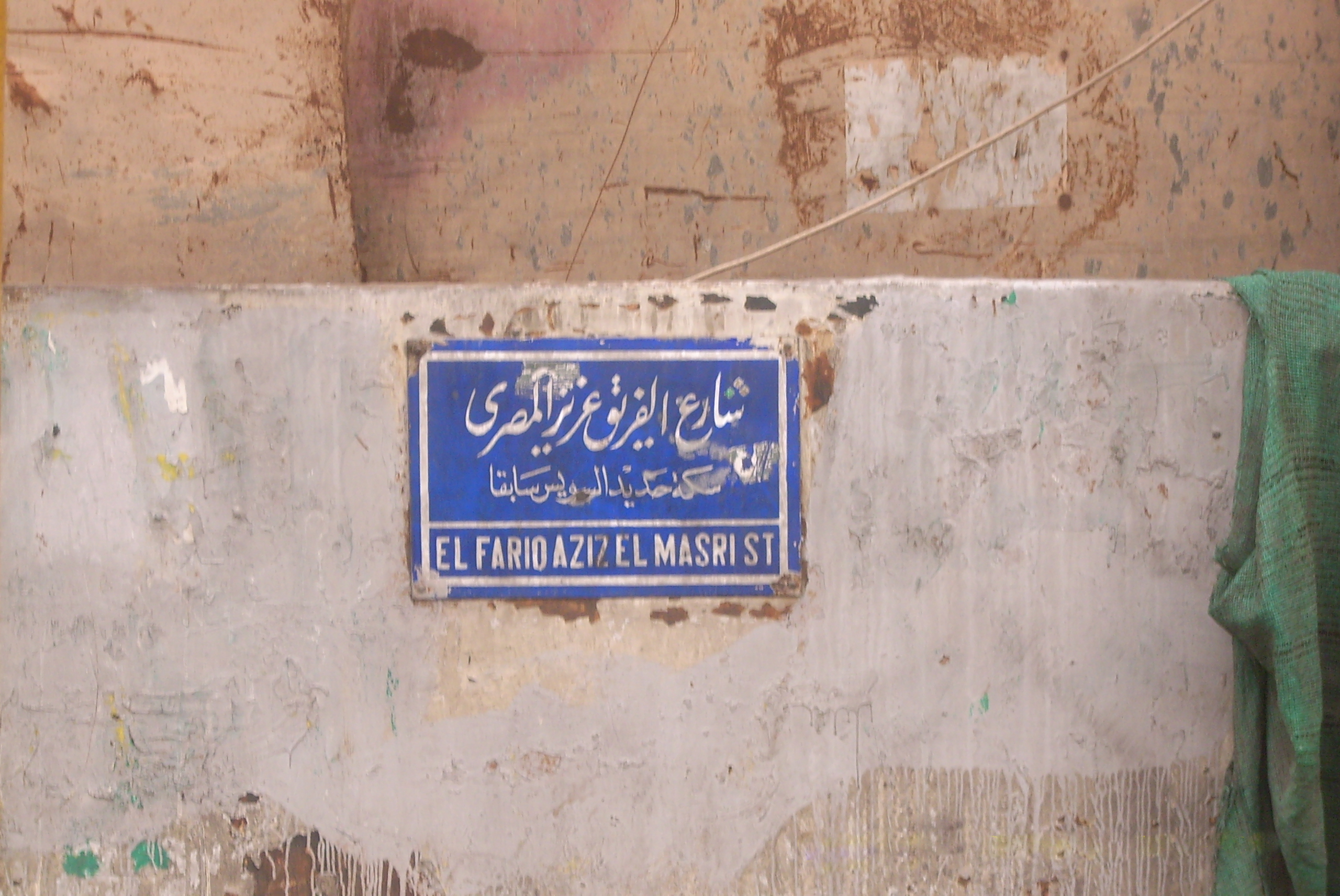
Fareq Aziz Ali el-Masry Street (Gisr el-Suez St.), Cairo Egypt.

== Post-1952 Revolution and death ==
After al-Misri had helped the Free Officers prepare for the revolution of 1952, they named him ambassador to Moscow in 1953 and considered making him president in place of Muhammad Naguib, but he retired in 1954.

He died on 15 June 1965 in Cairo. Egypt honoured him with a State funeral.

== Legacy ==
One of the longest streets in Greater Cairo was named after him.
