= Sinan Al Shabibi =

Iraqi economist (1941–2022)

Sinan Al Shabibi سنان الشبيبي
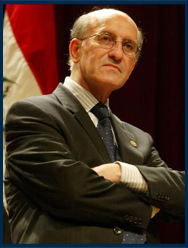

Governor of the Central Bank of Iraq
- In office September 2003 – October 2012
- Succeeded by: Abdel Basset Turki (acting)

Personal details
- Born: 1 July 1941 Baghdad, Kingdom of Iraq
- Died: 8 January 2022 (aged 80) Geneva, Switzerland
- Relations: Mohammed Ridha Al-Shabibi (father)
- Education: University of Baghdad; University of Manchester; University of Bristol
- Profession: Economist

Sinan Al-Shabibi (Arabic: سنان الشبيبي; 1 July 1941 – 8 January 2022) was an Iraqi economist who served as the governor of the Central Bank of Iraq from September 2003 to October 2012.

== Early life and education ==
Al-Shabibi was born in Baghdad on 1 July 1941, to a Shia Arab family. He is the son of the prominent Iraqi figure and scholar Mohammed Ridha Al-Shabibi. Al-Shabibi held a BSc in Economics from Baghdad University (1966), a Diploma in Advanced Studies in Economic Development, an MA in Economics from the University of Manchester (1970, 1971), and a PhD in Economics from the University of Bristol (1975).

== Early career ==
Between May 1975 and March 1977, Al-Shabibi worked as the Head of Imports and Marketing Section at the Iraqi ministry of oil. Then, from April 1977 to December 1980, he served as the Chief of plan Preparation and Co-ordination Division at the Iraqi Ministry of Planning.

Immediately after the start of the Iran–Iraq War, he moved to Geneva in Switzerland where he spent from December 1980 to October 2001 working as a Senior Economist in the United Nations Conference on Trade and Development (UNCTAD).

On 1 August 2002, Al-Shabibi testified among other witnesses at the Hearing Before the Senate Foreign Relations Committee about possible military action in Iraq. The topics that he addressed were the state of the Iraqi economy and its stabilisation post a possible military campaign.

== Governor of the Central Bank of Iraq ==
When he took over as central bank governor, Al-Shabibi introduced the bank's employees to modern finance and payment systems. He made the bank switch from typewriters and calculators to computers, introduced it to financial instruments like currency auctions, and replaced Iraq's pre-2003 banknotes with the New Iraqi Dinar between October 2003 and January 2004. He also involved directly the Central Bank of Iraq in the International Monetary Fund and World Bank co-operation programs, in addition to the Paris Club negotiations where 19 rich creditor nations agreed in 2004 to write off 80 percent of pre-2003 debt to help Iraq recover from the 2003 US-led invasion. Debt forgiveness talks with non-Paris Club nations are still under way.

In the effort to further modernise the Central Bank of Iraq, Al-Shabibi appointed Baghdad-born architect Zaha Hadid in August 2010 to design the new headquarters for the Central Bank in Baghdad. On 2 February 2012 Zaha Hadid joined Dr Sinan Al‐Shabibi at a ceremony in London to sign the agreement between the Central Bank of Iraq and Zaha Hadid Architects for the design stages of the new CBI Headquarters building.

Despite a highly uncertain domestic and external environment, Al-Shabibi held the Iraqi currency, the Iraqi Dinar firm at about US$1 = IQD 1'190 (US$1 equalled IQD 2'214 in December 2002), reduced inflation to single digits (from 64% in 2006 to 5.2% in September 2012), quadrupled the bank's gold reserves to 32 tonnes, and remained a strong advocate of central bank independence. The implementation of these policies combined with the rise in oil revenues helped to increase foreign exchange reserves to nearly US$67 billion (as of September 2012) up from US$2.7 billion in December 2002 supporting further Iraq's macroeconomic fundamentals for the purpose of weathering future oil price downside volatility.

== Death ==
Al Shabibi died on 8 January 2022, at the age of 80.

== Publications ==
- "Globalisation of Finance: Implications for macroeconomic policies and debt management", March 2001, Paper presented to a conference on "Globalization and the Gulf organised by the institute of Arab and Islamic Studies, University of Exeter, England, 2–4 July 2001.
- "Prospects for the Iraqi Economy: Facing the new reality". Paper presented to a conference on "The Future of Iraq", organised by the Middle East Institute, Washington. The paper was published in a book with the same title in November 1997 and reprinted in the UNCTAD secretariat. It deals with the effect of sanctions, debt, and war reparations on the future prospects of the Iraqi economy.
- "The Arab share in OPEC Aid: Some related facts" in Arabic, in Al-Mustaqbal Al-Arabi, Centre of Arab Unity Studies, Beirut, September 1988.
- "OPEC Aid, Issues and Performance" in the OPEC review, Vienna, spring 1987.
- "Studies on the Iraqi Economy", Iraqi Economic Forum, London, 2002, pp. 24–27.

== Accolades ==
- Arabian Business Power 500 – Listed among The World's Most Influential Arabs, June 2012., Arabic version – بالعربية
- Arabian Business Power 500 – Listed among The World's Most (in Arabic)
