= Mar'i Pasha al-Mallah =

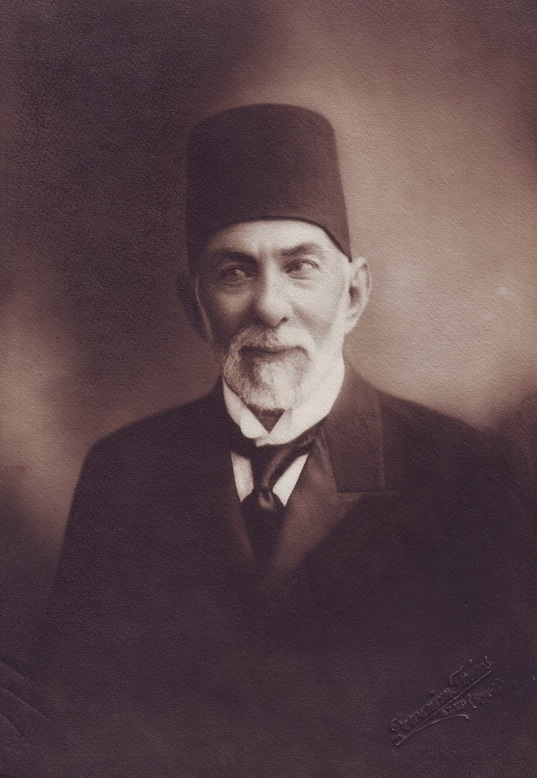
- Mar'i Pasha al-Mallah, Governor General of the State of Aleppo, 1924

3rd Governor General of the State of Aleppo
- In office 5 January 1924 – January 1925
- Preceded by: Mustafa Bey Barmada

Personal details
- Born: 1856 Aleppo, Ottoman Syria
- Died: 22 November 1930 (aged 73–74) Aleppo, Mandatory Syrian Republic
- Occupation: Politician

Mar'i Pasha al-Mallah (Arabic: مرعي باشا الملاح / ALA-LC: Mar‘ī Bāshā al-Mallāḥ; 1856 – 22 November 1930) was a Syrian political leader and statesman.

== Life ==
Al-Mallah was born in Aleppo. He graduated from the Galatasaray Mekteb-i Sultanisi (Galatasaray Imperial School) in Constantinople, in 1876.

Al-Mallah held major positions in Aleppo under the Ottoman (Turks), including:

- President of the Mixed Commercial Court (1885–1897);
- Mayor of Aleppo (1899–1900);
- District Attorney (1905–1906);
- Chairman of the Agro-Bank (1906–1907)
- Director of Endowments (1909–1911).

And he was Privy to Sultan Abdulhamid II.

He represented Aleppo in the Ottoman Parliament of 1908, and served as the last Ottoman Interim Governor of the Province of Aleppo. Following the Ottoman collapse, al-Mallah contributed to the foundation of the first modern Arab state in Syria under King Faysal I, became the governor of occupied Zor, and was elected Deputy Speaker of the Syrian National Congress (1919–1920). Finally, he was named Governor General of the State of Aleppo (1924–1926) under the French Mandate of Syria .

Al-Mallah acquired the rank of beylerbey, which corresponds to the rank of lieutenant general, from Sultan Abdulhamid II and was awarded several Ottoman, French and Syrian decorations.

Al-Mallah was a man of liberal views, open to western ideas and thought, proficient in Turkish, Persian, Armenian and French. He particularly loved photography, and used to keep massive albums featuring Ottoman and European royalty, politicians, writers and musicians. He was also noted for his collection of rare and antiquarian books and manuscripts, which he made available to scholars and researchers by dedicating them to the "Islamic Endowments Library of Aleppo," and the "Library of the Arab Academy" in Damascus.

Al-Mallah was described by a fellow historian Sheikh Kamil al-Ghazzi as "The leading notable of Aleppo". Moreover, his biography appeared in a number of books, and was also cited in dozens of historical works on Aleppo and modern Syria written by noted Arab and western scholars. His name also appeared in the memoirs of Syrian politicians as well as the accounts of Arab and western travelers, including the late Crown Prince Mohammed Ali Tewfik of Egypt, who visited Syria before the outbreak of World War I, and the memoirs of Lady Gertrude Bell.
