= 1936 Iraqi coup d'état =

1936 military coup in Iraq

Date	October 28–29, 1936
Location	Baghdad, Kingdom of Iraq
Result	Successful coup: Yasin al-Hashimi resigns; Hikmat Sulayman installed as Prime Minister

Belligerents
(Iraq) Iraqi Government	(Iraq) Bakr Sidqi's supporters

Commanders and leaders
(Iraq) Yasin al-Hashimi (Iraq) Nuri al-Said (Iraq) Ja'afar al-Askari †	(Iraq) Bakr Sidqi (Iraq) Hikmat Sulayman

Strength
	Two battalions

The 1936 Iraqi coup d'état, also known as the Bakr Sidqi coup, was initiated by General Bakr Sidqi that overthrew Prime Minister Yasin al-Hashimi of the Kingdom of Iraq. The coup succeeded in installing Sidqi's ally Hikmat Sulayman as the new prime minister, Sidqi became the de facto ruler of Iraq as powerful Chief of Staff and Sulayman was obliged to resign his post.

The overthrow was the first modern military coup in the Arab world, including Iraq. From then to 1941, in a wave of political instability, the Kingdom of Iraq experienced six more political coups involving extra-constitutional transfer of power.

== Background ==
In 1936, during the reign of Faisal I's ineffectual son King Ghazi I, General Bakr Sidqi, who had recently been named Chief of the General Staff of the Royal Iraqi Army, staged against the government of Yasin al-Hashimi what was probably the first modern military coup in the Arab world. Sidqi chose his timing carefully. Chief of Staff General Taha al-Hashimi was in Ankara, Turkey. Before the day of the coup, Sidqi had ensured that battalions of the Iraqi Army that were not led by his allies were far afield so that the capital defenceless would be left defenceless and that the Iraqi Air Force had been sent off for joint maneuvers with the Royal Air Force near the border with Iran.

Eleven Iraqi military planes dropped leaflets over Baghdad on October 29, 1936. They requested Ghazi to dismiss Yasin al-Hashimi's administration and to install the ousted anti-reform Prime Minister Hikmat Sulayman. They warned the citizens that military action would be taken against those who did not "answer our sincere appeal" and were signed by Sidqi himself as the "Commander of the National Forces of Reform". He threatened to attack the palace by using military units loyal to him and his allies from his authority as acting of Chief of Staff and to overthrow the government unless his demands were met within three hours.

== Coup ==
Interference by his opponents was neutralised by Sidqi. He sent a telegram to Taha al-Hashimi that ordered him not to return. An interview conducted by the writer Majid Khadduri claimed that Sidqi had disclosed to Khodduri that Ghazi had called British Ambassador Sir Archibald Clark Kerr over to Zahur Palace for advice. Kerr suggested for Ghazi to invite all ministers in the government for an emergency meeting. Of those in attendance were Yasin al-Hashimi, Nuri al-Said, General Jaafar al-Askari and Interor Minister Rashid Ali al-Gaylani. Ghazi initially discounted any notion of a revolutionary movement, but that proved incorrect, as reports of bombing in Serai and the advancement of troops towards Baghdad reached the palace.

With the exception of al-Said, all of those who were in the palace agreed to comply with Sidqi's demands and allow Hikmat Sulayman to take power. As a result, Yasin al-Hashimi resigned. According to Khodduri, Kerr suggested for Sulayman to be invited to the meeting. Coincidentally, Sulayman arrived at the palace to deliver the letter, written by Sidqi and Latif Nuri, to Ghazi that explained the implications of the coup. The exact details of the negotiation are subject to speculation; some have suggested that Ghazi was jealous of al-Said and on bad terms with Yasin al-Hashimi anyway, which led to the quick decision to surrender.

Jafar al-Askari, who was the defence minister during the coup and twice the prime minister of Iraq prior to Yasin al-Hashimi, sought to convince two battalions loyal to Sidqi to stop advancing toward Baghdad. He tried to appeal to officers who remembered his role as a founding father of the Iraqi army, but his appeals were intercepted by allies of Sidqi. Cautious of any dissension, Sidqi sent two of his men, Akram Mustapha, a member of the air force, and Ismail Tohalla, who had participated in the Simele massacre, to assassinate him. Al-Askari's death was widely viewed as a personal threat to the old government and demonstrated Sidqi's quest to purge anyone who might contest his shaky control over the army. After this incident, al-Said escaped to Cairo, and al-Hashimi left for Istanbul. Al-Hashimi also insisted for Ghazi to write a formal letter that accepted his resignation.

Despite the government's obvious overthrow, Sidqi found it necessary to enter the capital, Baghdad, with the army and to parade with the citizens. According to Khodduri, some felt that was a move to dissuade any last-minute resistance, and others felt that Sidqi wanted to prove himself with the parade and be applauded for bringing in a new regime for Iraq.

As a result of the coup, Sulayman became prime minister and interiror minister, but after overthrowing the government, it was Sidqi, who as commander of the armed forces, who essentially ruled Iraq by appointing personal adherents and allies to key posts. Other members of the new cabinet included Abu al-Timman, Minister of Finance; Kamil al-Chadirchi, Minister of Economics and Public Works; Abd al-Latif, Minister of Defense; and Yusuf Izz ad-Din Ibrahim as Minister of Education. Though Sidqi had been instrumental in the formation of the coup, he did not want a cabinet position and remained Chief of the General Staff.

== British stance ==
In 1936, the United Kingdom still exercised a great deal of influence in Iraq, notably because of the various military bases that it had kept by its treaties with Iraq during the process of ending its Mandate for Mesopotamia. The British advisor Cecil J. Edmonds appears to have been blindsided by the coup because of the low number of officers involved. However, Sulayman had attempted to contact him for a meeting before the coup, presumably in an attempt to assess British feelings and gain British support for the cause. Ultimately, the British briefly mobilised troops in Cairo in case they were needed but ultimately acquiesced to the coup, and the coup-plotters did not undertake hostile actions against British concessions or interests.

== Aftermath ==
Bakr Sidqi wanted to improve Iraqi ties towards Iran and Kemalist Turkey. He and Sulayman were also unenthusiatic of Pan-Arabism, which the previous government and many Sunni clerics supported. Sulayman instead hoped for a more pluralistic vision of Iraq, which would include Shia and Kurds more closely and fit with closer relations with Shia Iran. Sulayman also began investigations of the sources of wealth from members of the previous government, which uncovered various incidents of corruption and abuse of office for personal gain.

The murder of al-Askari and various other terrorist incidents such as the murder of Diya Yunis, a secretary of the cabinet in the previous government; and the attempted murder of Mawlud Mukhlis, a prominent pan-Arabist; and various other terrorist incidents created a blacklash and created strong feelings against the new government. Sulayman's cabinet lasted under ten months before Sidqi was assassinated in August 1937 en route to Turkey in the garden of an Iraqi Royal Air Force base in Mosul. Also, Mohammad ‘Ali Jawad, the commanding officer of the air force, was killed. Sidqi and Jawad had bene sent as part of a military mission by the Iraqi government in response to an invitation from the Turkish government. Sidqi had stopped in Mosul on August 11 on the way to Turkey to spend the afternoon with Jawed. A soldier, Muhammad ‘Ali Talla’fari, opened fire and instantly killed both men. The bodies of both men were flown to Baghdad the following day and buried with full military honours.

Many attribute his murder to Sulayman's anti-corruption reforms and Sidqi's dissociation from the idea of Pan-Arabism. It is still unclear as to who was behind the death of Sidqi, but many conspiracy theories have emerged. Some rumours at the time claimed that the British and al-Said had been behind it together. Liora Lukitz suggests that the most likely theory is the one thatr was gicen by the Sulayman government initially: that Sidqi was assassinated by a group of seven dissident military officers, who had withdrawn their support from Sidqi after he had promoted personal allies to key military posts.

As a result of Sidqi's assassination, Sulayman resigned as prime minister and was succeeded by Jamil al-Midfai. Al-Said returned from Cairo, and many of his allies resumed positions of power in the new government. Pan-Arabism returned to prominence, along with the Sunni-dominated vision of Iraq.

== Importance ==
The 1936 coup marked the beginning of the end of constitutional order in Iraq. Afterward, extra-constitutional and often-violent transfers of power became a rule, rather than the exception, and the rule of the constitutional monarchy began its gradual disintegration.

== See also ==
- 1941 Iraqi coup d'état
