= Battle of Wadi Musa =

- Part of Arab Revolt of the Middle Eastern theatre of World War I
| Date | October 23, 1917 |
| Location | Wadi Musa, Jordan |
| Result | Arab victory |

Belligerents
| (Arab Revolt) Kingdom of Hejaz | Ottoman Empire |

Commanders and leaders
| (Arab Revolt) Auda Abu Tayi (Arab Revolt) Mawlud Mukhlis | Djemal Pasha, Cemal Mersinli |

Strength
| 700 men | Large Infantry formation 3 biplanes |

Casualties and losses
| Unknown | 400 killed 300 captured |

The Battle of Wadi Musa was fought between the Arab Army and the Ottoman Empire during the Arab Revolt of 1916–1918.

The battle began when General Djemal Pasha ordered his forces to secure the Hejaz Railway by "any and all means necessary". The Ottoman Army at Ma'an was sent to deal with the North Arab Army. The Ottomans were ambushed by 700 Arab troops, inflicting heavy casualties and capturing 300 men. The remaining Ottoman forces retreated, leaving the railway uncaptured. After the battle, the Arabs rode further north to chase the retreating Turkish forces.

== Sources ==
- Al-Shyyab, Ibrahim Ahmad (2020). Mohammad Ali Ajlouni: A Figure of the Great Arab Revolt (1893–1971). Palarch’s Journal Of Archaeology Of Egypt.
