= Jamil Al Midfai =

Prime minister of Iraq variously in the 1900s

- جميل المدفعي
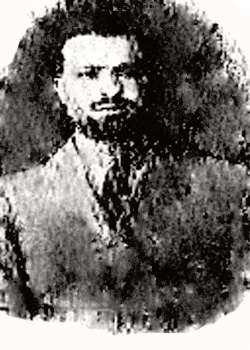

Prime Minister of Iraq
- In office 9 November 1933 – 27 August 1934
- Monarch: Ghazi I
- Preceded by: Rashid Ali al-Gaylani
- Succeeded by: Ali Jawdat Al-Ayyubi
- In office 4 March 1935 – 17 March 1935
- Monarch: Ghazi I
- Preceded by: Ali Jawdat Al-Ayyubi
- Succeeded by: Yasin al-Hashimi
- In office 17 August 1937 – 25 December 1938
- Monarch: Ghazi I
- Preceded by: Hikmat Sulayman
- Succeeded by: Nuri al-Said
- In office 4 June 1941 – 10 October 1941
- Monarch: Faisal II
- Regent: Prince Abdullah
- Preceded by: Rashid Ali al-Gaylani
- Succeeded by: Nuri al-Said
- In office 29 January 1953 – 17 September 1953
- Monarch: Faisal II
- Regent: Prince Abdullah
- Preceded by: Nureddin Mahmud
- Succeeded by: Muhammad Fadhel al-Jamali

Personal details
- Born: 1890 Mosul, Ottoman Iraq
- Died: 26 October 1958 (aged 67–68) Iraq

Jamil al-Midfai (Note: Arabic: جميل المدفعي) (1890 – 26 October 1958) was an Iraqi politician. He served as Prime Minister of Iraq on five occasions between 1933 and 1953.

== Biography ==
Jamil al-Midfai was born in the town of Mosul. He served in the Ottoman army during World War I, but deserted in 1916 to take part in the nationalist Arab Revolt after being captured by the Russians and recruited by the British. After the war, he was an aide to the Emir Faisal during his brief reign in Syria. He returned to Iraq in 1920 and Iraqi troops during the Iraqi Revolt seeking independence of the British. He was forced into exile in Transjordan because of his anti-British nationalist activities. Upon his return in 1923, he served in various senior provincial capacities and finally joined the cabinet in 1930.

al-Midfai was elected as the president of the Chamber of Deputies from December 1930 to November 1931, and from November 1931 to November 1933. He was appointed prime minister in November 1933, but he resigned soon after in February 1934 following internal government disputes in his cabinet, only to be back as prime minister in less than 10 days with a new cabinet, but that too would not last and he resigned again in August of the same year.

As a seasoned politician and two-time prime minister, al-Midfai was asked to form a new government in August 1937, following the assassination of General Bakr Sidqi, who had ruled the country as a military dictator for almost a year. A staunch monarchist, al-Midfai was again forced into exile to Transjordan following the short-lived pro-Axis coup by Rashid Ali al-Kaylani in 1941.

Upon his return to Iraq, he served in various senior capacities including President of the Senate of Iraq in the 1950s, and briefly as prime minister after the suspension of political activities during the 1952 Iraqi Intifada. He died on 26 October 1958 suffering from lung cancer.

== Fourth Ministry ==
When the Crown Prince 'Abd al-Ilah came back to Baghdad on 1 June 1941, he summoned al-Midfai to him and after careful consultations, the opinion settled on al-Midfai to form a new government, so the Prince sent him the following letter:

My most luxurious minister Jamil al-Midfai, Based on the dissolution of the government, and given the current circumstances, and depending on your knowledge and sincerity, We have entrusted you to head the new government, Provided that you elect your associates and present their names on us, and God is the Guardian of success.

— Abd al-Ilah

The circumstances in which al-Madfai was tasked with forming his fifth cabinet were strict and required the appointment of ministers and determining their responsibilities so quickly that he could not think about the extent of the cooperation that would take place between him and his associates in the management of state affairs in these circumstances.

And accordingly, the royal will was issued on the second day of June 1941 to appoint:

1. Jamil Al-Midfai: the Prime Minister
2. Ali Jawdat al-Aiyubi: Minister of Foreign Affairs
3. Mustafa Mahmud al-Umari: Minister of Interior
4. Nadhif Al-Shawi: Minister of Defense
5. Ibrahim Kemal: Minister of Finance and Minister of Justice
6. Jalal Baban: Minister of Works and Communications
7. Nasrat al-Farisi: Minister of economy
8. Mohammed Ridha Al-Shabibi: Minister of Knowledge.

== Notes ==
Political offices
Preceded by Rashid Ali al-Gaylani	Prime Minister of Iraq; 9 November 1933 — 25 August 1934	Succeeded by Ali Jawdat al-Aiyubi
Preceded by Ali Jawdat al-Aiyubi	Prime Minister of Iraq; 1 March 1935 — 16 March 1935	Succeeded by Yasin al-Hashimi
Preceded by Hikmat Sulayman	Prime Minister of Iraq; 17 August 1937 — 26 December 1938	Succeeded by Nuri as-Said
Preceded by Rashid Ali al-Gaylani	Prime Minister of Iraq; 2 June 1941 — 10 October 1941	Succeeded by Nuri as-Said
Preceded by Nureddin Mahmud	Prime Minister of Iraq; 29 January 1953 — 1 September 1953	Succeeded by Muhammad Fadhel al-Jamali
