= Al-ʽAhd (Iraq) =

Covenant Society جمعية العهد
- Founded: 1913/1930
- Dissolved: 1921/1932
- Headquarters: Damascus, Syria
- Colours: black, white, green, red

Al-ʽAhd, or the Covenant Society, (Arabic: جمعية العهد / ALA-LC: Jamʽīyat al-ʽAhd) was a political group organized in 1913, mainly by Iraqi officers serving in the Ottoman military. Most of these officers would serve in Sharif Husayn's army during the Arab Revolt and later in Faisal's Syrian army. It called for the independence of Iraq, with Amir Abdullah, son of Sharif Husayn, as king and Prince Zayd as his deputy; and the eventual union of Iraq with Syria. Later on, it sought economic and technical support from Britain as long as this aid did not hamper or undermine true freedom.

The group held its first meetings in Damascus and then established a number of branches in other Arab areas, including Iraq, notably in Baghdad and Mosul. It published a magazine, Al-Lisan. Its Iraqi members included Yasin al-Hashimi, Nuri as-Said, Jafar al-Askari, and Jamil al-Midfai. 'Aziz 'Ali al-Misri was one of its Egyptian members.

It also gained the support of Talib al-Naqib, who provided financial as well as moral support for its activities. Muhammed Sharif al-Faruqi, an officer whose talks with the British partially led to the British support of the Arab Revolt, claimed to be a member of al-ʽAhd, however studies later showed that this was not true.

Following the ouster of Faisal's Arab government from Syria in 1920, the group transferred its headquarters to Aleppo and Deir ez-Zor to continue to seek the establishment of an Arab government for Iraq. However, Faisal's collapse had greatly weakened the group, and its activities ceased soon after.

The party was re-established in 1930 after Nuri al-Said concluded the Anglo-Iraqi Treaty of 1930, which prompted a larger political reorganization in the country. Keeping in line with its original values, it promoted good relations with the British but also end the Mandate of Iraq to an end and bring about true independence. After true independence was achieved in 1932, the party was dissolved yet again.

== See also ==
- Sykes-Picot Agreement
