= Party of National Brotherhood =

1930s Iraqi-nationalist political party

Party of National Brotherhood حزب الاخاء الوطني
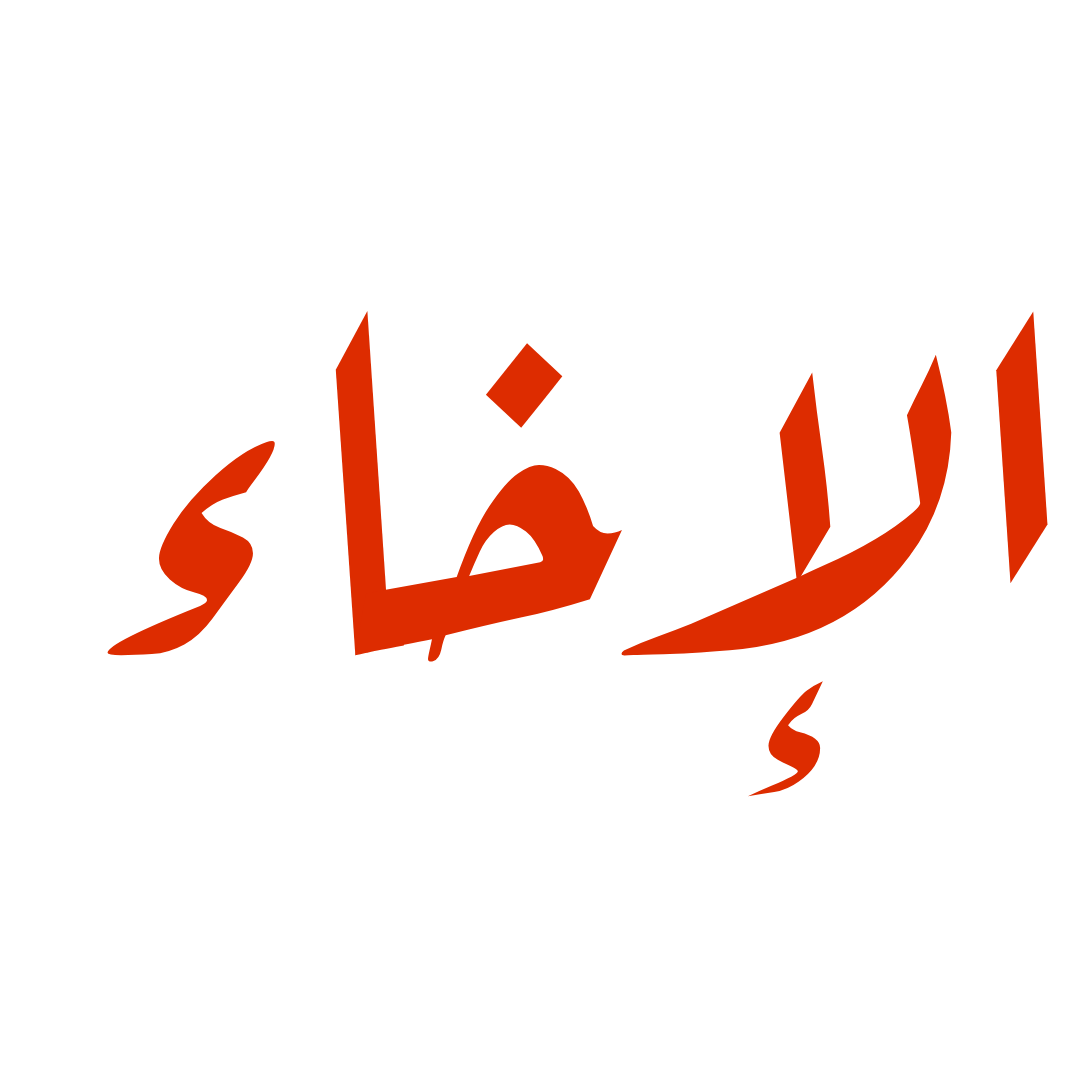
- Leader: Naji al-Suwaydi; Rashid Ali al-Gaylani; Yasin al-Hashimi
- Founded: 1930; 96 years ago
- Dissolved: 1941; 85 years ago
- Headquarters: Baghdad, Iraq
- Ideology: Arab nationalism Pan-Arabism; Conservatism; Anti-imperialism
- Political position: Right-wing
- Colours: Black White; Green Red

The Party of National Brotherhood or National Brotherhood Party (Arabic: حزب الاخاء الوطني, romanized: Hizb al-Ikha al-Watani, HIW) was an Iraqi political party formed in 1930–1931 by Yasin al-Hashimi, Naji al-Suwaydi, and Rashid Ali al-Gillani. A pan-Arabist and strongly nationalist party, it became associated with opposition to the British Empire. It dominated Iraqi governments from its foundation until the 1936 coup.

== Historical background ==
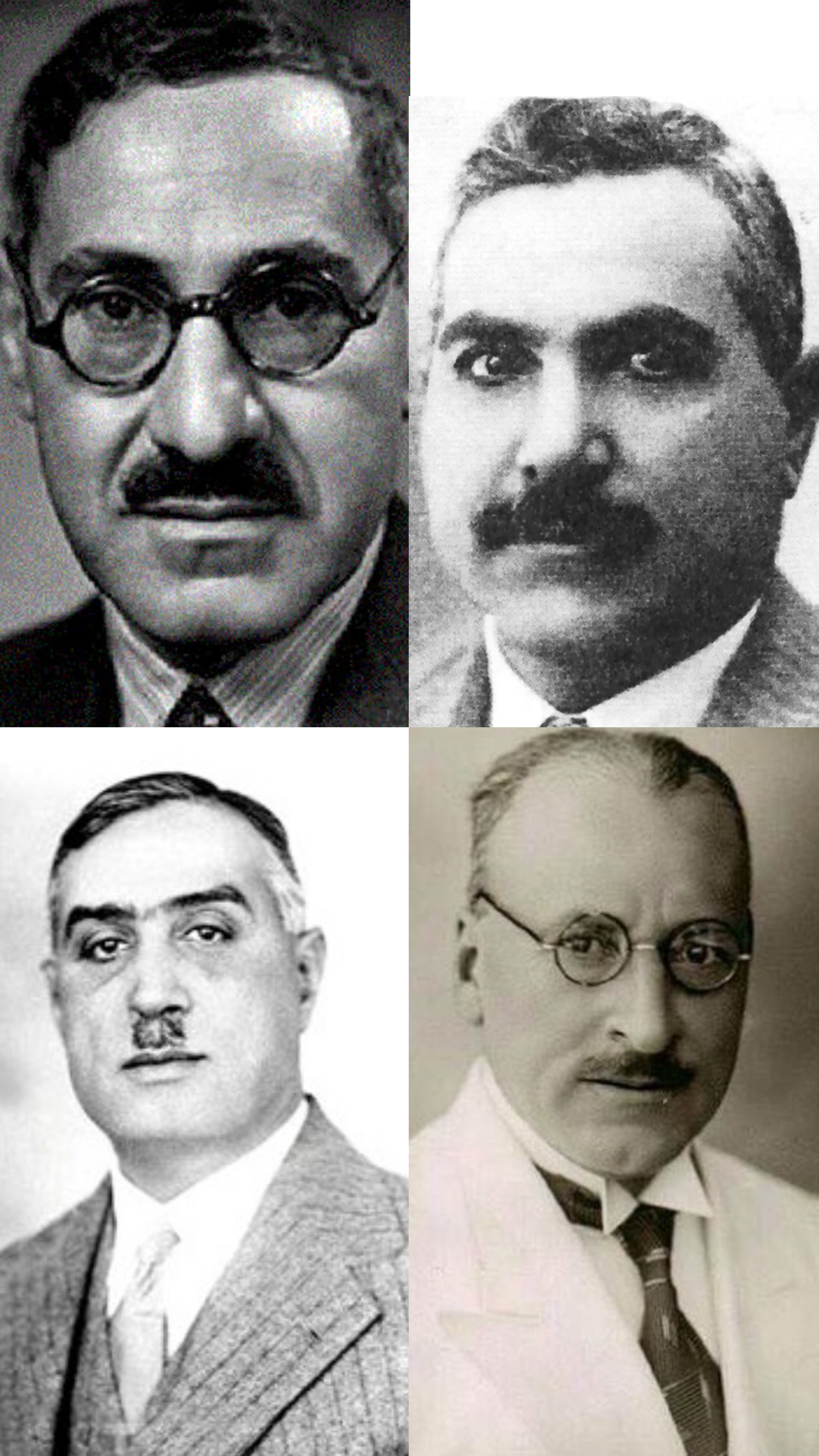
The main leaders of HIW (Clockwise from top left): Rashid Ali al-Gillani (top left), Yasin al-Hashimi (top right), Naji al-Suwaidi (bottom right) and Hikmat Sulayman (bottom left).

The HIW was formed somewhere between 1930 and 1931 as a merger between the minor National and People's parties and other like-minded nationalist groups. It gathered opponents of then Prime Minister Nuri Pasha al-Said who had concluded the Anglo-Iraqi Treaty of 1930. The new party soon gained the support of Jam'iyat Ashab al-San'a (Artisans' Society), the largest trade union in Iraq. The party held its first meeting in Baghdad in March of the same year, attracting 2000 followers to a rally where they called for a new government and a redefinition of the relationship between Iraq and the United Kingdom.

In order to demonstrate its importance the party organized strikes in July, although there was no direct political motive behind the move, other than showing that the HIW had support.

The party formed a pact with the Nationalist Party in 1932 and used this to gain influence in the Iraqi parliament. With this influence secured they forced out the government of Naji Shawkat and soon established an HIW government, despite the fact that the majority of the chamber had been elected on an anti-HIW ticket. However the initial government was not to last long as advisers close to the new King Ghazi convinced him that the HIW government was responsible for tribal unrest. As such the government was removed and al-Gillani and his right-hand man Yasin Pasha were to be excluded from future governments. This remained the case for future HIW administrations, although al-Gillani returned to the top job after King Ghazi's death.

== Governments ==
During the Kingdom of Iraq period that party supplied the Prime Minister on five occasions. Those governments identified as Party of National Brotherhood were:

- Rashid Ali al-Gaylani, March 20, 1933 – November 9, 1933
- Yasin al-Hashimi, March 17, 1935 – October 30, 1936 (partnership with the military)
- Hikmat Sulayman, October 30, 1936 – August 17, 1937
- Rashid Ali al-Gaylani, March 31, 1940 – February 3, 1941
- Rashid Ali al-Gaylani, April 13, 1941 – May 30, 1941
