= Taha al-Hashimi =

Prime minister of Iraq in 1941

- طه الهاشمي
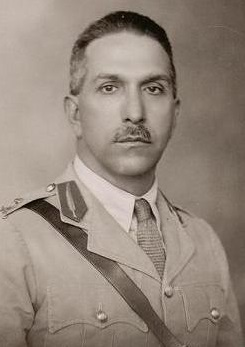

Prime Minister of Iraq
- In office 1 February 1941 – 1 April 1941
- Monarch: Faisal II
- Regent: Prince Abdullah
- Preceded by: Rashid Ali al-Gaylani
- Succeeded by: Rashid Ali al-Gaylani

President of the United Popular Front
- Vice President: Mohammed Ridha Al-Shabibi
- Succeeded by: Mohammed Ridha Al-Shabibi

Personal details
- Born: 1888 Baghdad, Ottoman Iraq
- Died: 11 June 1961 (aged 72–73) London, United Kingdom
- Party: United Popular Front
- Relations: Yasin al-Hashimi (brother)

Taha al-Hashimi (Arabic: طه الهاشمي; 1888-1961) was an Iraqi politician and military officer, he served in the Ottoman army then the Iraqi army between 1906 and 1936, and as Prime Minister of Iraq in 1941.

== Biography ==
Al-Hashimi was born in Baghdad in 1888. After his religious education he attended a primary school. He graduated from a military secondary school in 1903. Then he attended the Military College in Istanbul and graduated in 1906. Following his graduation he joined the Ottoman army as an officer. He became a captain in 1909 after completing his studies at the General Staff College. Al-Hashimi fought in the Balkan wars then against the British in Yemen during World War I until the Ottoman surrender in 1919 and was briefly held as a prisoner of war. In 1921 he resigned from the ottoman army and went back to Iraq where he was appointed as a commander in the Mosul province. He continued to serve in various military posts then as minister of defense until 1941.

Al-Hashimi served briefly as the prime minister of Iraq for two months, from 1 February 1941 to 1 April 1941. He was appointed prime minister by the regent, 'Abd al-Ilah, following the first ouster of the pro-Axis government of Rashid Ali al-Gaylani during World War II. When Abd al-Ilah fled the country, fearing an assassination attempt, al-Hashimi resigned, and the government reverted to al-Gaylani.

After the end of his premiership Al-Hashimi left Iraq and lived in Istanbul until the end of World War II. Upon his return he founded the opposition group United Popular Front in 1951 and served as its president. Died in London on 11 June 1961.

Al-Hashimi's brother, Yassin, also served as Iraqi prime minister in 1924 and in 1936.
