= Mustafa Mahmud al-Umari =

Prime minister of Iraq from 1952 to 1953

Mustafa Mahmood Al-Umari (also Mustafa Mahmood Al-Omari)
- مصطفى محمود العمري
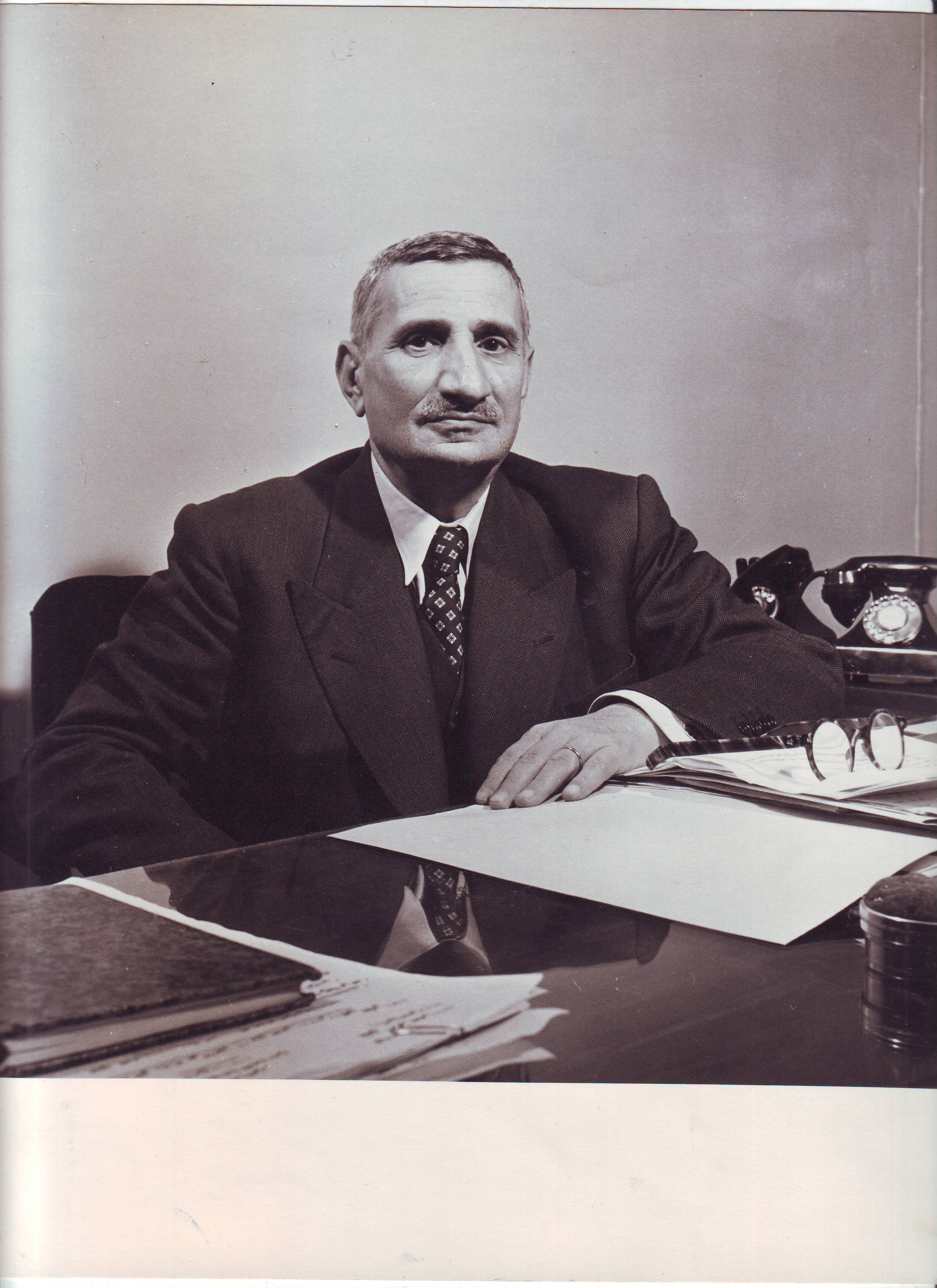

Prime Minister of Iraq
- In office 12 July 1952 – 23 November 1952
- Monarch: Faisal II
- Regent: Prince Abdullah
- Preceded by: Nuri al-Said
- Succeeded by: Nureddin Mahmud

Personal details
- Born: 1894 Mosul, Ottoman Empire
- Died: 1962 (aged 67–68) London, UK
- Children: Muayed, Muwafaq, Mukarram, Widad, Dhuka

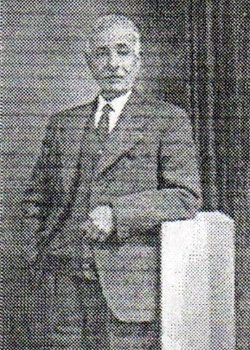

Mustafa Mahmood Al-Umari (also Mustafa Mahmood Al-Omari) (Arabic: مصطفى محمود العمري; 1894 – 1962) from Mosul, Iraq (Sunni-Arab) who became an Iraqi statesman. He served as prime minister from 9 July 1952 until 22 November 1952. He was appointed by King Faisal II's cousin and regent 'Abd al-Ilāh after nationwide protests against the government. Starting out as an attorney and civil servant, he served many posts including Minister of Interior and Minister of Justice. In 1952, his failure to maintain control during the Intifada cost him his position. He was also a provincial Governor and Senator in Parliament. After the 1958 revolution against the Monarchy, he left the political scene. Being an independent, he was not associated with many of the royalists or partisans who were jailed or executed in the aftermath of the revolution. He later left to the UK for medical treatment and died there. He was later buried in the Al-Omari waqf cemetery in Mosul, Iraq.

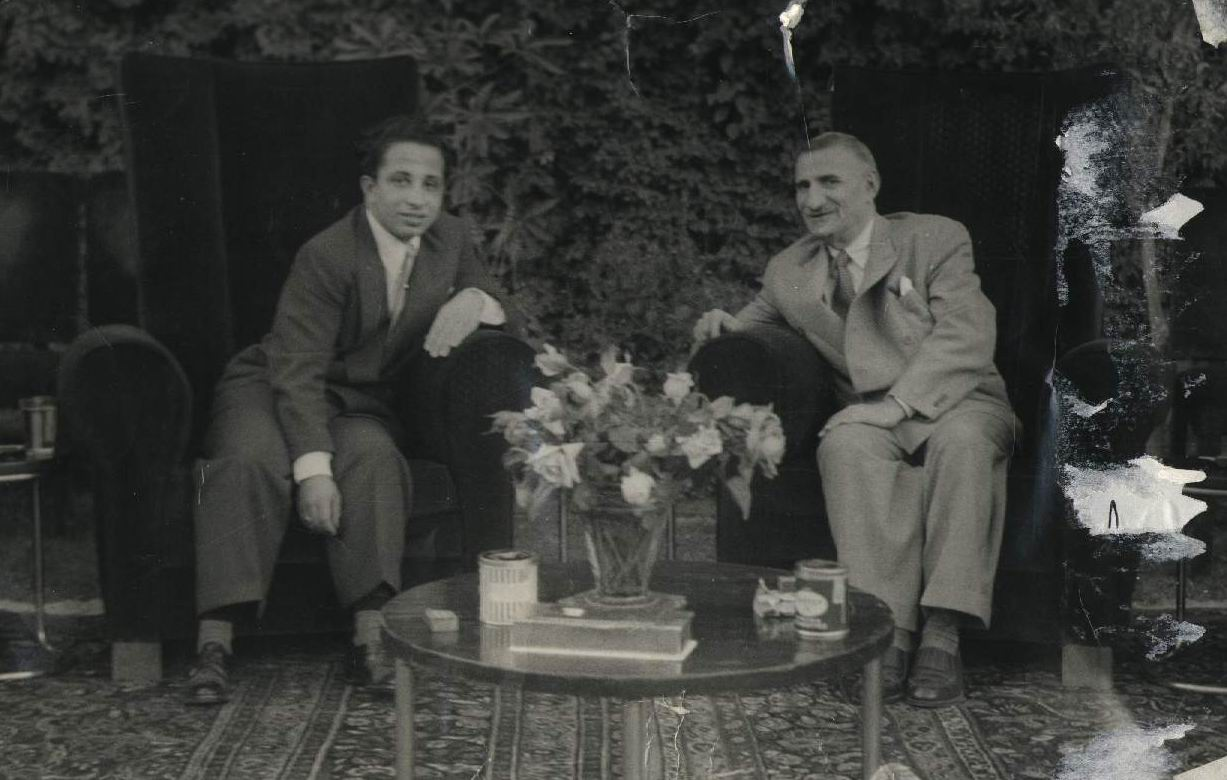
Mustafa Al-Umari (right) with King Faisal II in 1952
