= Mohammed Ridha Al-Shabibi =

22nd President of the Chamber of Deputies of Hashemite Iraq

Mohammed Ridha al-Shabibi الشيخ محمد رضا الشبيبي
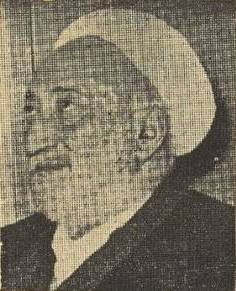

President of the United Popular Front
- Preceded by: Taha al-Hashimi

Personal details
- Born: 1889
- Died: 1965
- Party: United Popular Front
- Spouse: Shamsa Rahmatalla
- Relations: Sinan al-Shabibi (son)
- Occupation: Politician, Poet, Teacher, Author

Sheikh Mohammed Ridha al-Shabibi (Arabic: الشيخ محمد رضا الشبيبي; 1889 – 1965) was a notable Iraqi national figure, statesman, poet, and educator. A member of the prominent al-Shabibi family of Najaf, he studied religion and literature, and as a young man published poetry in major publications of the Arab World (Syria, Lebanon, and Egypt).

He lived from 1889 until 1965, and played a major role for Iraq to achieve independence after World War I. He was the emissary of petitions, letters and messages from Iraqi political and religious figures to Sharif Hussein bin Ali and Faisal I to explain the desire and importance of Iraqis to achieve freedom and independence in 1919.

This was a major step as he publicized formally outside Iraq the desire of Iraq's self-determination and its opposition to British rule after World War I. This was the start of a process that actually led to Iraq's independence on 3 October 1932.

Mohammed Ridha al-Shabibi also served in Chamber of Deputies of Iraq from the 1920s through the 1940s and as minister of education in several cabinets (1924–1925, 1935, 1937–1938, 1941, 1948). He was the president of the Chamber of Deputies from December 1943 to December 1944. He was elected president of the Iraqi Academy in 1928–1929 and in the 1930s became a member of the Arabic Language Academy in Cairo. He authored a number of books on Iraqi history, the Iraqi dialect, and education.

== Family and personal life ==
Mohammed Ridha al-Shabibi married Shamsa Rahmatalla in 1926. They had 4 sons (As'ad, Akram, Amjad, and Sinan al-Shabibi) and 6 daughters (Wajiha, Hadiya, Aida, Arwa, Asmaa, and Dunia Al-Shabibi). As'ad al-Shabibi his elder son was abducted by the Iraqi Baathist regime for his political views on the morning of 26 November 1980. His youngest son, Sinan al-Shabibi became the governor of the Central Bank of Iraq in 2003 immediately after the fall of the regime.
