= Nureddin Mahmud =

Prime minister of Iraq from 1952 to 1953

- نور الدين محمود
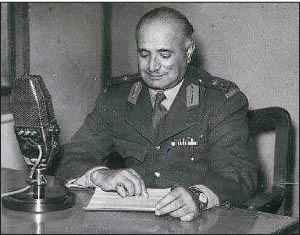
- Mahmud in the 1950s

Prime Minister of Iraq
- In office 23 November 1952 – 29 January 1953
- Monarch: Faisal II
- Regent: Prince Abdullah
- Preceded by: Mustafa Mahmud al-Umari
- Succeeded by: Jamil Al Midfai

Personal details
- Born: 1899 Mosul, Ottoman Iraq
- Died: 1981 (aged 81–82)

Nureddin Mahmud (Note: Arabic: نور الدين محمود) (1899–1981) was an Iraqi politician who served as the Prime Minister of Iraq from 23 November 1952 until 29 January 1953.

== Early life ==
Nureddin Mahmud was born in 1899 in Mosul. He graduated from Ottoman military school in 1917 and joined the newly established Iraqi army in 1921, he served multiple military positions throughout his career in the army, including as a commander of Arab armies during the 1948 Arab-Israeli War and Chief of Staff of the Iraqi army in 1951.
