= Naji Shawkat =

Prime minister of Iraq from 1932 to 1933

- ناجي شوكت
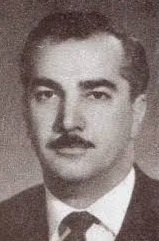

1st Prime Minister of the Kingdom of Iraq
- In office 3 November 1932 – 20 March 1933
- Monarch: Faisal I
- Preceded by: Nuri as-Said
- Succeeded by: Rashid Ali al-Gaylani

Personal details
- Born: 26 May 1891 Kut, Ottoman Empire
- Died: 11 May 1980 (aged 88) Baghdad, Iraq
- Relatives: Saib Shawkat (brother)

Muhammad Naji Shawkat Bey (Arabic: ناجي شوكت) (May 26, 1891 – May 11, 1980) was an Iraqi politician who served as the prime minister of Iraq under King Faisal I.

== Early life ==
Muhammad Naji Shawkat was born to an Arabized family of Georgian origins in the Iraqi town of al-Kut where his father was stationed as provincial governor. He had three brothers: Saaib, Sami and Rifat and a sister. Concurrent with Naji's conclusion of his school education in Baghdad, his father was elected to the Ottoman parliament of 1909, thereby providing him with the opportunity to join the Ottoman Law School in Istanbul.

== Military service ==
Naji Shawkat was the assistant general prosecutor in the Iraqi city of al-Hilla when World War I broke out, upon which he interrupted his legal career and joined the Ottoman Army as a reserve officer. After two years of involvement in the Ottoman military defense of Iraq, Shawkat was captured by the advancing British troops in March 1917. He was subsequently taken to a British Indian prison camp where he, like many other detained Arab Ottoman officers, was offered the choice of joining the Arab Revolt, an offer he promptly accepted.

== Political career ==
=== Naji Shawkat Ministry ===
The Ministry of Naji Shawkat consisted of the following ministers:

- Finance Minister, Nusrat al-Farsi
- Minister of Justice, Jamil al-Wadi
- Minister of Economy and Communications, Jalal Baban
- Minister of Defense, Rashid al-Khoja
- Foreign Minister, Abd al-Qadir al-Rashid
- Minister of Education, Abbas Mahdi

=== Prime Minister of Iraq ===
In 1932, Shawkat was called on by King Faisal I to head a non-partisan government that was intended to clear the political congestion which accompanied the signing of the Anglo-Iraqi treaty. Faced with strong opposition from within the Iraqi political establishment and the anti-treaty campaign, Shawkat's government lasted only five months. Thereafter, he was appointed as representative of Iraq in Ankara where he cultivated strong relations with the Turkish ruling circles and developed a sense of admiration for modern Turkey.

Afterwards, Shawkat worked as a minister in Ankara. During the 1941 Iraqi coup d'état, he was appointed at the Minister of Interior. Following the fall of the regime in the Anglo-Iraqi War, Shawkat fled to Iran, then to South Africa. He was later brought to trial in Iraq and sentenced to 15 years in prison for treason by a military court. Shawkat was pardoned in 1948.

Political offices
Preceded by Nuri as-Said	Prime Minister of Iraq; November 3, 1932 — March 20, 1933	Succeeded by Rashid Ali al-Kaylani
