= Hikmat Sulayman =

Prime minister of Iraq from 1936 to 1937

- حكمت سليمان
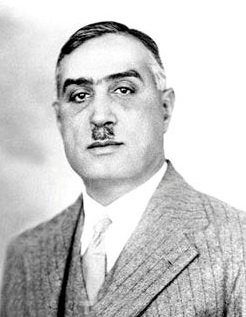

Prime Minister of Iraq
- In office 30 October 1936 – 17 August 1937
- Monarch: Ghazi I
- Preceded by: Yasin al-Hashimi
- Succeeded by: Jamil al-Midfai

Personal details
- Born: 1889
- Died: 16 June 1964 Baghdad, Baathist Iraq
- Party: Party of National Brotherhood

Hikmat Sulayman (1889 – 16 June 1964) (Arabic: حكمت سليمان) was Prime Minister of Iraq from October 30, 1936 to August 12, 1937 at the head of a Party of National Brotherhood government.

Sulayman, of Iraqi Arab, Circassian and Georgian descent, was a key figure in the early days of Iraqi independence and the effort to create a multi-ethnic state. He came to power in Bakr Sidqi's coup, the first that the country experienced. His position was confirmed by King Ghazi.

He was president of the Chamber of Deputies in 1926. Together with Sidqi, Sulayman veered away from the pan-Arab nationalism of the preceding Iraqi governments. Together with Sidqi, he forged an alliance with Turkey and settled the border dispute with Iran, two countries he regarded as potential allies in the struggle against Arab nationalist sentiment. Nevertheless, he differed with Sidqi over the emphases of the new government, preferring to address social issues in the country, while Sidqi focused on military affairs and expanding Iraq's borders.

== His political positions ==
Sulayman held the following political positions in the Iraqi state:

- He was elected a member of the Iraqi parliament in 1925.
- Then he rose to the position of Minister of Justice and resigned in 1928.
- He was appointed Minister of Knowledge.
- He was appointed Minister of Interior.
- He was the head of the Iraqi parliament.
- He was prime minister in the era of the coup of Bakr Sidqi in 1936, and he served as Prime Minister in Iraq from October 30, 1936 to August 12, 1937, and managed the helm of government with unparalleled sincerity. After the coup, he was sentenced to five years' imprisonment, and forced to resign after the assassination of Bakr Sidqi in 1937.

== Bibliography ==
- Wien, Peter (2014), Iraqi Arab Nationalism: Authoritarian, Totalitarian and Pro-Fascist Inclinations, 1932–1941, Routledge, ISBN 978-1134204793.

Political offices
Preceded by Yasin al-Hashimi	Prime Minister of Iraq; October 30, 1936— August 12, 1937	Succeeded by Jamil al-Midfai
