= Rashid Ali al-Gaylani =

Former prime minister of Iraq (1892–1965)

Sayyid Rashid Ali Al-Gailani
- رشيد عالي الکَيلاني
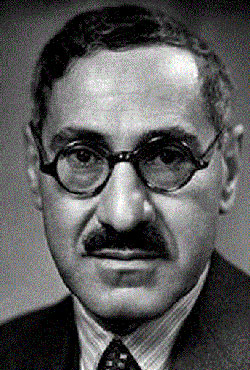

Prime Minister of Iraq
- In office 20 March 1933 – 9 November 1933
- Monarchs: Faisal I Ghazi I
- Preceded by: Naji Shawkat
- Succeeded by: Jamil al-Midfai
- In office 31 March 1940 – 3 February 1941
- Monarch: Faisal II
- Regent: Prince Abdullah
- Preceded by: Nuri al-Said
- Succeeded by: Taha al-Hashimi
- In office 13 April 1941 – 30 May 1941
- Monarch: Faisal II
- Regent: Sharaf bin Rajeh
- Preceded by: Taha al-Hashimi
- Succeeded by: Jamil al-Midfai

Personal details
- Born: 1892 Baghdad, Ottoman Iraq
- Died: 28 August 1965 (aged 72–73) Beirut, Lebanon
- Party: Party of National Brotherhood

Rashid Ali al-Gaylani (Al-Gailani) (Note: in Arab standard pronunciation Rashid Aali al-Kaylani; also transliterated as Sayyid Rashid Aali al-Gillani, Sayyid Rashid Ali al-Gailani or sometimes Sayyad Rashid Ali el Keilany ("Sayyad" serves to address higher standing male persons)) (Arabic: رشيد عالي الکَيلاني, Arabic pronunciation: [raʃiːd ʕaːliː al.keːlaːniː]) (1892 – 28 August 1965) was an Iraqi politician who served as Prime Minister of Iraq on three occasions: from March to November 1933, from March 1940 to February 1941 and from April to May 1941. He is chiefly remembered as an ardent Arab nationalist who attempted to remove British influence from Iraq by starting a coup against the government in 1941. During his brief tenures as prime minister in 1940 and 1941, he attempted to negotiate settlements with the Axis powers during World War II to counter British influence in Iraq.

== Early life ==
Rashid Ali was the son of Sayyid Abd al-Wahhab al-Gailani and born into the prominent Baghdad-based Al-Gailani family. The name Al-Gailani indicates that their ancestors originated in Gilan, Iran. He also had origins in the Circassian governors of the Ottoman Vilayet. Members of the Gailani family were known as sayed, as the family's ancestry can be traced back to the Islamic prophet Muhammad. Rashid Ali enrolled in law school in Baghdad and was a lawyer until his political career.

== Political career ==
In 1924, Rashid Ali al-Gailani began his career in politics in the first government led by Prime Minister Yasin al-Hashimi. Yasin al-Hashimi appointed Gailani as the Minister of Justice. The two men were ardent nationalists and were opposed to any British involvement in the internal politics of Iraq. They rejected the Anglo-Iraqi Treaty signed by the government of Prime Minister Nuri as-Said in 1930. They formed the Party of National Brotherhood to promote nationalist aims. Gaylani served as prime minister for the first time in 1933 but held office for less than eight months. In 1938 he was seized and exiled to 'Ana for his suspected role in the Baghdad bomb-throwing of November and the general political upheaval.

He was elected as the president of the Chamber of Deputies in 1925 and 1926.

During the Hashimi government, Gailani served as Minister of Interior with the additional benefit of the lucrative trusteeship of the Qadiri Awqaf. Later, as prime minister, he would retain the interior portfolio as public works projects progressed, including the laying of the foundations for a mosque to be named the Faysal Mosque.

On 31 March 1940, when Gailani was again appointed prime minister, World War II had started and Iraq had just experienced the premature death of King Ghazi. Ghazi's reign was followed by a Regency for his four-year-old son who was now the new King Faisal II. Faisal's Regent was Ghazi's uncle, Emir Abdul-Illah. Abdul-Illah supported Britain in the war, but he was unable to control Gaylani, who used the war to further his own nationalist goals by refusing to allow Allied troops passage through Iraq to the front. He also rejected calls for Iraq to break its ties with Fascist Italy and sent his Justice Minister, Naji Shawkat, to Ankara to meet with Germany's ambassador to Turkey, Franz von Papen, to win German support for his government. German Foreign Ministry archives record that Shawkat met von Papen on July 5, 1940, and he carried a letter of introduction from Mohammad Amin al-Husayni, the Grand Mufti of Jerusalem, expressing a desire for a treaty of friendship and collaboration. Baghdad was the early base for Nazi Middle East intelligence operations during World War II.

=== 1941 Iraqi coup d'état ===
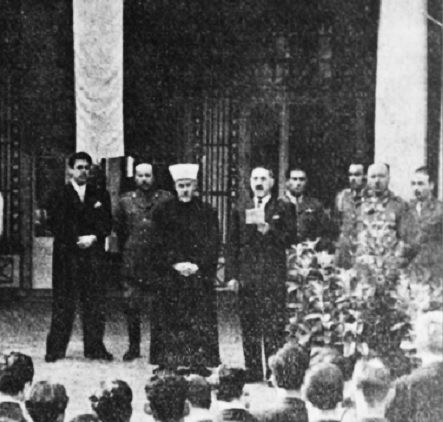
Rashid Ali al-Gaylani and Haj Amin al-Husseini, speaking at the anniversary of the 1941 Iraqi coup in Berlin

Britain responded by issuing economic sanctions against Iraq. Meanwhile, news of British victories against Italian forces in North Africa weakened support for Gaylani. On 31 January 1941, under pressure from Regent Abdul-Illah, he resigned as prime minister. This only exacerbated his mistrust of Britain and its supporters in the Iraqi government. Together with the members of the Golden Square, Gaylani made plans to assassinate Regent Abdul-Illah and seize power. On 31 March, Abdul-Illah discovered the plot to assassinate him and fled the country.

On April 1, the Golden Square executed their coup d'état; on April 3, the "National Defence Government" replaced the government of the Regent with Gaylani as prime minister. As one of his first acts, Gaylani sent an Iraqi artillery force to attack the RAF base in Habbaniya. By the end of April, Iraqi troops held strong positions on the escarpment above the base, and a siege began.

Iraq had been a major supplier of petroleum to the Allied war effort and represented an important landbridge between British forces in Egypt and India. To secure Iraq, British Prime Minister Winston Churchill ordered General Archibald Wavell to protect the air base at Habbaniya. On 18 April, British forces from India landed in Basra, Sabine Force. In the Mandatory Palestine, another force was created to enter Iraq from the west and relieve RAF Habbaniya, Habbaniya Force.

=== Anglo-Iraqi War ===
At Habbaniya, the besieging Iraqis demanded the cessation of all training activities and of all flights in and out of the base. On 2 May, the commander at RAF Habbaniya, Air Vice-Marshal Harry George Smart, responded to the Iraqi demands by launching a pre-emptive strike against the Iraqi forces overlooking the air base. This action initiated the Anglo-Iraqi War. Within a week, the Iraqis abandoned the escarpment. By mid-May, British forces consisting mainly of Assyrian levies from Habbaniya had moved on to Fallujah and, after overcoming Iraqi resistance there, moved on to Baghdad. On 30 May, as British troops were closing in on his position, Gaylani fled to Iran.

On 31 May, an armistice between the British and the Iraqis was signed. On 1 June, the Regent returned to Baghdad and his government was restored. Immediately afterwards, the Farhud, a violent pogrom against Jews, took place in Baghdad.

=== Iran, Italy, Germany and Saudi Arabia ===
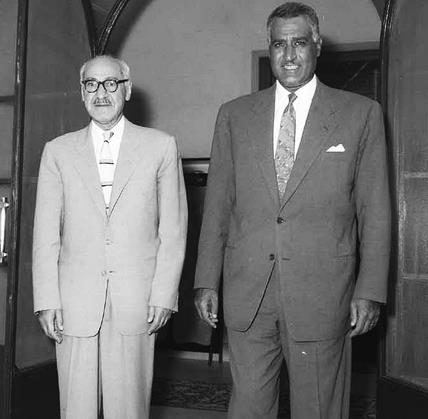
Al-Gaylani with Egyptian president Gamal Abdel Nasser in Cairo, August 1958

Gaylani was not to stay long in Iran. On 25 August 1941 the British and Soviet forces invaded Iran and removed Reza Shah from power. Gaylani then fled to Italy. Later he was received by German dictator Adolf Hitler in Berlin, and he was recognized as the leader of the Iraqi government in exile. Upon the defeat of Germany, Gaylani again fled and found refuge, this time in Saudi Arabia.

== Later life and death ==
Gailani did not return from exile until after the revolution that overthrew the Iraqi monarchy, in 1958. Once again, he attempted to seize power; he plotted a revolt against Abdul Karim Kassem's government. The revolt failed and Gaylani was sentenced to death. However, he was pardoned in July 1961, allowing him to live in Lebanon until 1965 when he died at the age of 72.

== See also ==
- Fritz Grobba
- Nazi relations with the Arab world

== Bibliography ==
- Aboul-Enein, Youssef; Aboul-Enein, Basil (2013). The Secret War for the Middle East: The Influence of Axis and Allied Intelligence operations During WW. Naval Institute Press. ISBN 978-1612513096.
- Lewis, Bernard (2003). The crisis of Islam: holy war and unholy terror. Random House Publishing Group. ISBN 9781588360755.
- Longrigg, Stephen Hemsley (1953). Iraq, 1900 To 1950: A Political, Social, and Economic History. Oxford University Press.

Political offices
Preceded by Naji Shawkat	Prime Minister of Iraq; March 20, 1933 — October 29, 1933	Succeeded by Jamil al-Midfai
Preceded by Nuri as-Said	Prime Minister of Iraq; March 31, 1940 — January 31, 1941	Succeeded by Taha al-Hashimi
Preceded by Taha al-Hashimi	Prime Minister of Iraq; April 3, 1941 — May 29, 1941	Succeeded by Jamil al-Midfai
