= Yasin al-Hashimi =

4th and 17th prime minister of Iraq (1884–1937)

- ياسين الهاشمي
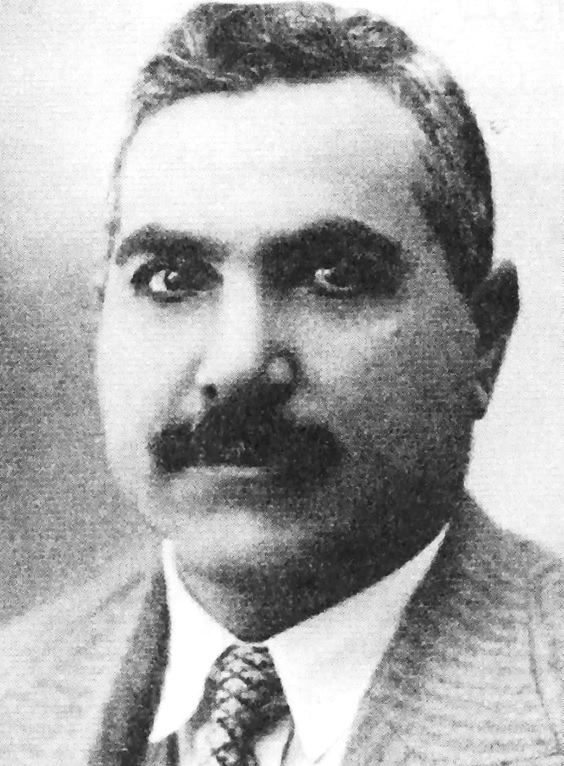
- Yasin al-Hashimi as Minister of Finance, 1927

Prime Minister of Mandatory Iraq Prime Minister of the Kingdom of Iraq
- In office 24 August 1924 – 26 June 1925
- Monarch: Faisal I
- Preceded by: Jafar al-Askari
- Succeeded by: Abd al-Muhsin as-Sa'dun
- In office 17 March 1935 – 30 October 1936
- Monarch: Ghazi I
- Preceded by: Jamil al-Midfai
- Succeeded by: Hikmat Sulayman

Personal details
- Born: 1884 Baghdad, Ottoman Iraq
- Died: 21 January 1937 (aged 52–53) Beirut, Lebanon
- Party: Party of National Brotherhood (during 2nd term)
- Relations: Taha al-Hashimi (brother)

Military service
- Allegiance: Ottoman Empire (1902–1918); Arab Kingdom of Syria (1918–1920); Kingdom of Iraq (1921–1936)
- Branch/service: Ottoman Army (Arab Kingdom of Syria) Arab Army (Kingdom of Iraq) Royal Iraqi Army
- Years of service: 1902–1918; 1918–1920, 1921–1936
- Battles/wars: First World War; Middle Eastern theatre; Franco-Syrian War; Battle of Maysalun; 1935–1936 Iraqi Shia revolts

Yasin al-Hashimi (born Yasin Hilmi Salman; Arabic: ياسين الهاشمي; 1884 – 21 January 1937) was an Iraqi military officer and politician who twice served as Prime Minister of Iraq. Like many of Iraq's early leaders, al-Hashimi served as a military officer during the Ottoman control of the country. He made his political debut under the government of his predecessor, Jafar al-Askari, and replaced him as prime minister shortly after, in August 1924. Al-Hashimi served for ten months before he was replaced, in turn by Abdul Muhsin al-Sa'dun. Over the next ten years he filled a variety of governmental positions finally returning to the office of prime minister in March 1935. On 30 October 1936, Hashimi became the first Iraqi prime minister to be deposed in a coup, which was led by General Bakr Sidqi and a coalition of ethnic minorities. Unlike al-Askari, who was then his minister of defense, al-Hashimi survived the coup and made his way to Beirut, Lebanon, where he died three months later. His older brother and close ally, Taha al-Hashimi, served as Prime Minister of Iraq in 1941.

== Early life and family ==
Al-Hashimi was born as "Yasin Hilmi" in Baghdad in 1884, during Ottoman rule. His father, Sayyid Salman, was the mukhtar (headman) of the Barudiyya Quarter of Baghdad and claimed descent from the Islamic prophet Muhammad. The family was middle class, Sunni Muslim and ethnically Arab, although the family's claim of Arab descent has been disputed. According to historian Muhammad Y. Muslih, the family were descendants of the Turkish Karawiyya tribe that settled in Iraq in the 17th century.

== Military career ==
=== Ottoman service ===
He enrolled into the Ottoman Military Academy of Istanbul and graduated in 1902. During his time in the academy, he adopted the nisba (surname) "al-Hashimi" in reference to the religiously prestigious Banu Hashim tribe of Muhammad, from which his family claimed descent. He performed well at the academy and was recognized for his military skills. In 1913 he was stationed in Mosul and joined al-Ahd, an underground Arab nationalist society composed of Ottoman Arab officers. The branch in Mosul had been founded by al-Hashimi's brother Taha and was led by al-Hashimi. Among the officers under al-Hashimi's command were future Iraqi statesmen and military figures, including Mawlad Mukhlis, Ali Jawdat al-Aiyubi and Jamil al-Midfai. Through al-Hashimi as a liaison, al-Ahd developed relations with al-Fatat, an underground Arab nationalist society based in Damascus, which al-Hashimi joined in 1915 during a trip to Syria following the outbreak of World War I. Al-Fatat was allied with Emir Faisal, a leader of the Sharifian Army and a contender for establishing a monarchy over a united state consisting of the Ottomans' Arab territories.

He was loyal to the Ottomans throughout World War I, during which the Ottomans were part of the Central Powers alliance. While he was based in Tulkarm, al-Hashimi was asked by Faisal to join the Sharifian Army, but he refused, stating he could not abandon his military duties. Despite his Arab nationalist affiliations, he opposed a plot by the nationalists to kill Jamal Pasha, despite his awareness that Jamal Pasha was intent on crushing the Arab nationalist movement. In 1917, he commanded an Ottoman division at Galicia during the Russian offensive. He was recognized for his successes against the Russians during that campaign, including by German Emperor Wilhelm II, and subsequently promoted to major general.

In 1918 al-Hashimi was assigned as the commander of the Ottoman Fourth Army garrison in Tulkarm. That year, in the spring, he commanded Ottoman troops against the British-led offensive in Amman and al-Salt. He was wounded during these battles and sent to Damascus to recover. The British and their Arab allies in the Sharifian Army defeated the Ottomans and an armistice was concluded in October 1918. He attempted to resume his service in the Ottoman Army, but was refused because he did not apply for readmission within a year of the armistice.

=== Chief of Staff of the Arab Army ===
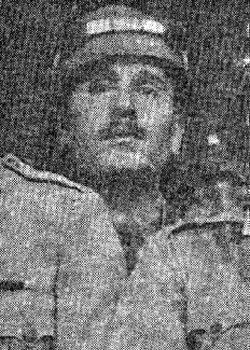
Al-Hashimi in military uniform

Al-Hashimi's refusal to join Faisal's army came despite promises of support he gave to Faisal in 1915. Of all the personalities Faisal met in his 1915 Damascus trip, it was al-Hashimi's assertion of support at the home of Nasib al-Bakri that convinced Faisal to launch the revolt. As the chief of staff of mostly Arab units in the Ottomans' Arab provinces, al-Hashimi's word carried weight and when Faisal offered to support al-Hashimi's units with Hejazi tribal fighters, al-Hashimi replied that he had "no need of them", but just wanted Faisal "to lead us and be in the vanguard".

After Faisal's entry into Damascus in October 1918 and the setting up of a provisional Arab government under his leadership, Faisal appointed al-Hashimi as President of the Military Council. He was also given the additional office of Secretary of Military Affairs and was charged with the recruitment of volunteers into the newly formed Arab Army to counter potential challenges by the French, who sought to rule Syria. At this time al-Hashimi assumed leadership over al-Ahd's Iraqi-dominated wing, which gave him further control over many Iraqi ex-Ottoman officers. Under his leadership, al-Ahd began a vociferous campaign opposed to French and British rule in Syria and Mesopotamia, respectively. Without coordinating with Faisal and after the latter left for Europe for negotiations with the European powers, al-Hashimi launched a mass conscription campaign aimed at adding 12,000 new troops to the Arab Army. The French requested al-Hashimi's arrest for his recruitment drive, but the British refused. However, British General Edmund Allenby managed to end al-Hashimi's efforts, which were disavowed by Faisal's government.

Al-Hashimi soon re-launched efforts to recruit Arab soldiers, but at a more clandestine level, and was boosted by Sheikh Kamil al-Qassab's drive to create popular militias in Damascus and throughout the country. Al-Hashimi's actions were driven by a desire to boost his nationalist credentials to compensate for his previous hesitance to join Faisal's army, and as a means to gain more power. He became the clear leader of the ardent Arab nationalist camp and was accused by the British of coordinating with Turkish General Mustafa Kemal on ending European control in Syria in pursuit of personal power.

=== Arrest by the British and return to Syria ===
In late November 1919, al-Hashimi was arrested by the British military for recruiting soldiers to resist the French in the Beqaa Valley, suspicions that he was in contact with Mustafa Kemal, who was fighting the French in Turkey, and for leading an anti-British propaganda campaign in Iraq. Al-Hashimi's arrest was not formal; rather, he was kidnapped by British authorities after being invited to the British military headquarters in Mezzeh for a meeting and then taken to Haifa, after which he was moved to different places in Palestine under strict British supervision. His arrest precipitated a crisis in Faisal's government and provoked protests and riots in Damascus. The British military had been present in Syria since October 1918, but after agreements with the French, who were to assume a mandate over Syria, the British withdrew in December 1919. The loss of British protection left Faisal's government more vulnerable to a French takeover. War Minister Yusuf al-'Azma replaced al-Hashimi following his arrest.

The British authorities informed Faisal that they arrested al-Hashimi for attempting to create a republic and overthrow Faisal and his government; al-Hashimi had grown powerful and had wielded more influence over the army than Faisal. The Syrian National Congress condemned al-Hashimi's arrest and condemned Prime Minister Ali Rida al-Rikabi for his apparent apathetic attitude to the arrest. Al-Rikabi held a more conciliatory view toward the European powers and was ultimately pressured to resign on 10 December.

Al-Hashimi was allowed to return to Syria via Egypt in early May 1920. By then, a French offensive to capture Damascus was impending. Al-Hashimi was tasked by Faisal, who declared himself King of the Arab Kingdom of Syria in March 1920, with inspecting the state of the Arab Army under al-'Azma's command. Upon inspecting the Arab troops, al-Hashimi concluded that they were not prepared to confront an invasion by the militarily superior French forces. Al-Hashimi particularly noted the lack of arms and that the Arab Army's soldiers only possessed enough ammunition to fight for two hours. He refused an assignment by Faisal to command the Arab Army's post at Majdal Anjar in the Beqaa Valley and also turned down a request to resume his position as chief-of-staff due to the precarious position of the army. In response to Faisal's inquiry about the cause of the lack of arms and ammunition, al-Hashimi responded that the French were in control of Syria's ports, the British controlled Palestine, the Transjordan region, and Iraq, and the Turks were occupied by their war in Anatolia, and thus Syria was effectively blocked from importing weaponry. In a meeting of the army's General Staff, al-'Azma rejected al-Hashimi's assessment and accused him of bitterness as a result of his secondary role in the army. Ultimately, however, al-'Azma and the General Staff officers understood the weak state of the army.

French forces launched their offensive in mid-July, and al-'Azma decided to rally whatever troops and local volunteers he could assemble to confront the French. Al-Hashimi, firmly believing that the Arab Army could not hold out against the French, remained in Damascus, while al-'Azma's forces encountered the French in what became known as the Battle of Maysalun. The Arabs were decisively defeated, al-'Azma was killed and the French entered Damascus on 25 July.

== Political career in Iraq ==
=== Governor of Muntafiq ===
In March 1922, al-Hashimi arrived in Baghdad, where Faisal had been relocated and assumed power as King of Iraq. In June 1922, Faisal assigned al-Hashimi as Mutassarif (Governor) of Liwa Muntafiq (Muntafiq Province). He was subsequently posted at the capital of the province, an-Nasiriyah. Al-Hashimi was offered a position in Prime Minister Ja'far al-'Askari's cabinet in October 1923, but after he stated that he could not guarantee his support for the 1922 Anglo-Iraqi Treaty, the offer was withdrawn. Al-Hashimi ultimately agreed to recognize the treaty and was appointed to the cabinet in November.

=== First premiership ===
During the 25 January 1924 constituent assembly election, al-Hashimi won a seat in the assembly. Opposition to the Anglo-Iraqi Treaty became evident in the constituent assembly and protests by Iraqi lawyers were held opposing the treaty. According to Gertrude Bell, al-Hashimi, who chaired a special committee to examine and publish an opinion about the treaty, instigated the protests. According to historian Ali al-Allawi, al-Hashimi used his position on the committee "to undermine al-'Askari's cabinet and show it up as a feeble and incompetent government, unable to shepherd the country through trying times."

The constituent assembly was dissolved on 24 August 1924, following the completion of its main mission, the negotiation and passing of the Anglo-Iraqi Treaty. Al-'Askari's cabinet resigned on the same day and Faisal appointed al-Hashimi as prime minister. Although Faisal's British advisors were wary of al-Hashimi and his loyalties, they acceded to Faisal's decision, which was partly motivated by a desire to keep an influential figure like al-Hashimi in Faisal's governing party instead of in the opposition. As prime minister, al-Hashimi appointed himself the defense minister and foreign affairs minister. Faisal, as commander-in-chief of the military, countered al-Hashimi's appointment to the defense ministry, by assigning loyalist Nuri as-Said as deputy commander of the military.

Another of Faisal's motivations in appointing al-Hashimi was his view that al-Hashimi's ardent nationalist position made him well-suited to handle the Turkish-Iraqi territorial dispute over the former Mosul Vilayet. At the time of al-Hashimi's appointment, the Turkish government agreed to allow the League of Nations to send a commission to then-British-held Mosul to determine which country its inhabitants favored joining and to make recommendations regarding a final settlement of the territorial dispute. The commission decided in July 1925 that Mosul should remain part of Iraq, that Iraq should remain under British Mandatory rule for 25 years and that Kurdish cultural rights and self-administration be recognized by the Iraqi state. Al-Hashimi was replaced by Abd al-Muhsin as-Sa'dun in June. Al-Hashimi opposed as-Sa'dun's government and in November 1925 founded the People's Party (hizb ash-sha'b) to garner opposition to the administration. The People's Party opposed British Mandatory rule and pressed for independence and reform.

=== Formation of National Brotherhood Party ===
In 1930, the Iraqi and British governments began the renegotiation of the Anglo-Iraqi treaty and as a result, the political climate in Iraq became highly charged between the faction calling for gradual independence and cooperation with Britain and those who favored swift independence from Britain. Al-Hashimi was among the principal leaders of the latter camp, while Prime Minister as-Said led the former. As-Said formed the Covenant Party (hizb al-ahd), a symbolic nod to the al-Ahd society, to rally support for his policies. Al-Hashimi, meanwhile, sought to muster opposition against as-Said and British rule, establishing the National Brotherhood Party (hizb al-ikha' al-watani) after uniting his People's Party with Ja'far Abu Timman's National Party (hizb al-watani). According to historian Charles Tripp, the party was formed as an "alliance between two disparate personalities [al-Hashimi and Abu Timman] and linked two parties which drew on different sections of Iraqi society for their support"; the People's Party was largely composed of Sunni Muslim Arabs who had work experience in the Ottoman and Iraqi states, while the National Party mostly consisted of educated, urban Shia Muslim Arab laymen with links to the rural Shia tribal sheikhs.

Subsequent to Iraq's accession to the League of Nations, King Faisal, in pursuit of domestic reform and consolidation, tried to give opposition groups greater voice in the parliament and cabinet. Thus, the National Brotherhood Party was allowed into power. However, its forfeiture of demands concerning the Ango-Iraqi Treaty and callous management of the Assyrian Affair lost it credence with other reformist groups—particularly many from the National Party. In 1932 Iraq gained its independence from Great Britain and about a year later King Faisal died and was replaced by his son Ghazi. Al-Hashimi's party lost power with Ghazi's accession, and owing to the failure of traditional methods. In succession, he appointed Rashid Ali al-Gaylani, al-Midfai and al-Aiyubi as prime ministers between 1933 and 1935. During al-Aiyubi's premiership, he successfully lobbied King Ghazi to dismiss parliament and he then rigged the parliamentary elections and significantly reduced the National Brotherhood Party's representation. In January 1935, a series of Shia tribal uprisings against the government began. Part of the tribesmen's demands were that al-Aiyubi resign, which he did when Hikmat Sulayman of the National Brotherhood instructed his ally, General Bakr Sidqi, to withhold military action against the tribesmen. Afterward, al-Hashimi lent his support to the Shia tribal rebellion in Diwaniya against al-Aiyubi's successor, al-Midfai. Al-Hashimi instructed his brother and the army chief of staff, Taha, to not suppress the revolts.

=== Second premiership ===
With Taha's withholding of action against the tribal rebels, al-Midfai became convinced that Taha and al-Hashimi had conspired against the government and he consequently resigned. With the uprisings in full swing, King Ghazi appointed al-Hashimi, who was seen as the only person who could stabilize the country, as prime minister in March 1935. The uprisings largely dissipated a week into al-Hashimi's appointment. In April, the National Brotherhood Party dissolved itself. In order to coopt the tribal sheikhs who participated in the uprising, al-Hashimi maneuvered to guarantee many of the sheikhs entry into parliament in the August 1935 elections. Thereafter, the sheikhs became key supporters of al-Hashimi as he became their political patron. Tensions between the government and the tribes remained regarding the issue of conscription, which the latter opposed and the former strongly advocated.

When al-Hashimi had the conscription law passed, a Yazidi revolt broke out in Jabal Sinjar against the measure in October. Al-Hashimi declared martial law in Jabal Sinjar and had the revolt suppressed, resulting in the deaths or imprisonment of hundreds of Yazidis and the destruction of several villages. Despite the revolt's suppression, the Yazidi population continued to evade conscription orders. Prior to the Yazidi revolt, armed disturbances in the Kurdish-dominated north of the country in August related to intra-tribal divisions and opposition to conscription was ordered to be quelled by al-Hashimi. The Kurdish rising would come to an end in March 1936. A similar uprising by Shia tribes in the lower Euphrates region was also quelled at roughly the same time. According to Tripp, under the leadership of al-Hashimi and General Sidqi, the Iraqi army "crush[ed] the rebellions with a now characteristic ruthlessness".

Al-Hashimi's Arab nationalist credentials during his second premiership were strong enough that he became known as the "Bismark of the Arabs" in Arab nationalist circles. Al-Hashimi's tenure as prime minister, particularly in 1936, led to growing dissent and resentment among the ruling elite, including King Ghazi and his former ally Hikmat Sulayman. During the course of 1936, al-Hashimi largely ruled by decree, expanded the police forces and intelligence agencies, and repressed any public disapproval of his government. To the latter end, he shut down the Al-Ahali newspaper for publishing criticism of his premiership and prevented demonstrations against his government in Baghdad. He also believed that tribal revolts in some of the country's provinces were being coordinated with his political opponents, and used General Sidqi to harshly put them down. Al-Hashimi's actions and method of rule fueled disaffection within the army's ranks. By late 1936, General Sidqi, frustrated at not being promoted, also grew resentful of al-Hashimi and attributed his lack of hierarchical elevation to al-Hashimi's brother, Chief of Staff Taha.

Sidqi and Sulaymani conspired to topple al-Hashimi. They made their move when Taha left for a visit to Turkey and appointed Sidqi as acting chief of staff. Using his interim position, Sidqi had his army units enter Baghdad in a show of force under the banner of the "National Reform Force", while having leaflets dropped over the city informing residents that the Iraqi Army had instructed King Ghazi to dismiss al-Hashimi and replace him with Sulayman. King Ghazi had likely been informed of the impending coup d'état against al-Hashimi and lent his quiet support by forbidding any resistance against the army. He did not dismiss al-Hashimi until the latter submitted his resignation following air force bombardment in the vicinity of his office. Sulayman was then appointed by King Ghazi as prime minister.

== Death ==
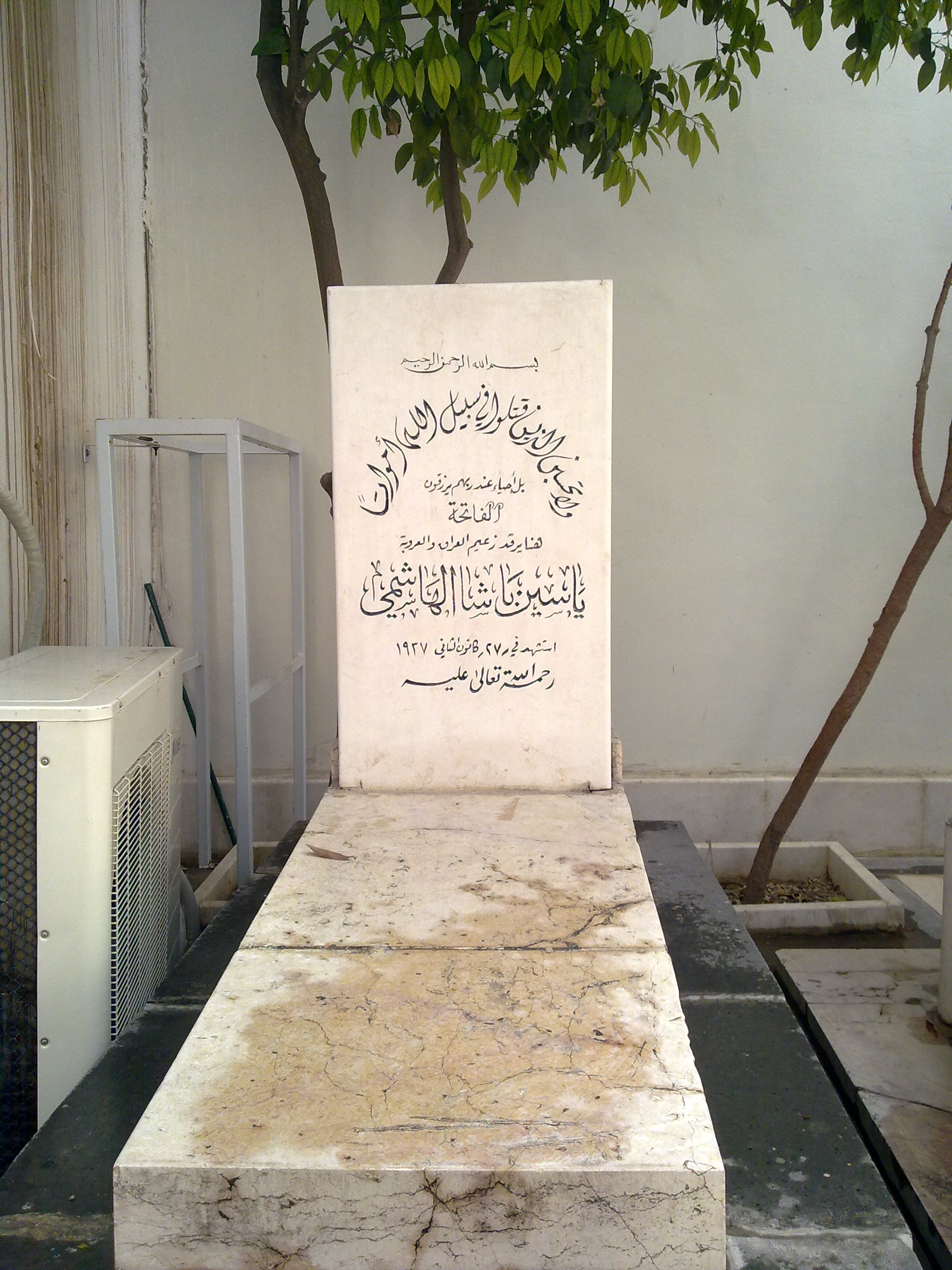
The tomb of al-Hashimi outside of the Mausoleum of Saladin in Damascus, Syria. The tombstone contains a verse from the Qur'an that reads "Think not of those who are slain in Allah’s way as dead. Nay, they live, finding their sustenance in the presence of their Lord"

Al-Hashimi was exiled from Iraq following the 1936 Bakr Sidqi coup and moved to Lebanon, then under French Mandatory rule. On the morning of 21 January 1937, al-Hashimi died in a Beirut hospital in the presence of his brother Taha after experiencing two heart attacks. Immediately after his death, his doctor sent telegrams informing numerous Arab leaders and organizations, including King Ghazi, Emir Abdullah I of Transjordan, Amin al-Husseini, the Grand Mufti of Jerusalem, the government of Egypt and the National Bloc of Syria. The al-Hashimi family requested from King Ghazi that al-Hashimi be buried in Iraq, but after initial hesitation from the Iraqi government, a group of Lebanese dignitaries advised the family to instead have al-Hashimi buried in Damascus. Doctors from the American University in Beirut (AUB) embalmed al-Hashimi's body and the Syrian authorities prepared a burial plot for the body adjacent to the Mausoleum of Saladin.

=== Funeral ===
On the morning of 22 January, the first leg of al-Hashimi's funeral procession began, with his Arab flag-draped coffin being carried by students of the AUB from his home in Ras Beirut toward the Omari Mosque in the city. The procession in Lebanon was led by the Muslim Boy Scouts and the Lebanese police force and included Lebanese dignitaries, Taha al-Hashimi, the consuls of Iraq and Saudi Arabia, and a Damascene delegation led by parliament member Fakhri al-Barudi. A prayer was then held at the Omari Mosque and an AUB student read a poem dedicated to al-Hashimi. Non-Muslim Lebanese dignitaries also attended the prayer, including former Prime Minister Beshara al-Khoury. From the Omari Mosque, al-Hashimi's body was transported to Damascus. Prior to its arrival to the city, the funeral cortege made a symbolic stop in Maysalun, at the tomb of Yusuf al-Azma, to commemorate the fallen Arab soldiers and volunteers who died in the battle against the French.

Al-Hashimi's cortege was greeted by thousands of spectators once it arrived in Damascus, with reports from the local Al-Qabas newspaper reporting that the number of participants in the city was unprecedented. Participants in the procession, included Boy Scouts, Orthodox Boy Scouts, Kurdish Boy Scouts, Iron Shirts (a youth movement affiliated with the National Bloc founded by al-Barudi), the youth movement of the League of National Action, students from the Syrian University and Damascene secondary schools, police units, and large crowds of residents. Also in attendance was Prime Minister Jamil Mardam Bey, the British vice consul, the Saudi consul, representatives of the various Christian patriarchates, the leader of the Damascene Jewish community, Palestinian leaders Izzat Darwaza and Akram Zuaiter.

Prior to the Damascus procession, the Iraqi government communicated its approval of interring al-Hashimi's body in Baghdad after mourning ceremonies in Beirut and Damascus, but forbade Taha's participation in the final funeral procession. The al-Hashimi family accepted the Iraqi government's conditions. However, following the funeral procession in Damascus, disagreements between the Iraqi and Syrian governments prevented al-Hashimi's body from being transported to its intended final resting place in Baghdad. The Syrian government denied that there was a conflict with the Iraqi government and cited unsuitable road conditions due to heavy rainfall as the reason al-Hashimi's body could not be transported to Baghdad, but it is well known that the mutual antagonism between the two governments precluded the al-Hashimi family's initial wishes for al-Hashimi's burial. Al-Hashimi was laid in state at the shrine of Husayn ibn Ali in the courtyard of the Umayyad Mosque in Damascus. On 27 January, al-Hashimi's family agreed to have him buried at the Mausoleum of Saladin, adjacent to the Umayyad Mosque.

== Bibliography ==
- Allawi, Ali A. (2014). Faisal I of Iraq. Yale University Press. ISBN 9780300127324.
- Khadduri, Majid (1960). Independent Iraq 1932-1958: A Study in Iraqi Politics. New York: Oxford University Press. OCLC 752781448.
- Marr, Pheobe (2004). The Modern History of Iraq (2nd ed.). Boulder: Westview Press. ISBN 0813382149.
- Muslih, Muhammad Y. (1988). The Origins of Palestinian Nationalism. Columbia University Press. ISBN 9780231065092.
- Nafi, Basheer M. (1998). "King Faysal, the British and the Project for a Pan-Arab Congress, 1931–33" (PDF). Islamic Studies. 37 (4): 479–502. Archived from the original (PDF) on 5 March 2016.
- Sluglett, Peter (2007). Britain in Iraq: Contriving King and Country. I.B. Tauris. ISBN 9781850437697.
- Tarbush, Mohammad A. (1988). The Role of the Military in Politics: A Case Study of Iraq to 1941. Routledge. ISBN 9781317406372.
- Tauber, Eliezer (1995). The Formation of Modern Iraq and Syria. Routledge. ISBN 9781138925823.
- Tripp, Charles (2000). A History of Iraq. Cambridge University Press. ISBN 9780521529006.
- Wien, Peter (2011). "The Long and Intricate Funeral of Yasin al-Hashimi: Pan-Arabism, Civil Religion and Popular Nationalism in Damascus, 1937". International Journal of Middle East Studies. 43 (2): 271–292. doi:10.1017/S0020743811000067. S2CID 154451279.

Political offices
Preceded by Jafar al-Askari	Prime Minister of Iraq; 2 August 1924 – 22 June 1925	Succeeded by Abd al-Muhsin as-Sa'dun
Preceded by Jamil al-Midfai	Prime Minister of Iraq; 17 March 1935 – 30 October 1936	Succeeded by Hikmat Sulayman
