= Arab tribes of Iraq =

The vast majority of Iraqis identify with a tribe (العشيرة 'ashira). Iraq is home to approximately 150 tribes, 30 of which are considered the most influential, composed of about 2,000 smaller clans with varying sizes and influence — the largest numbering more than one million people, the smallest a few thousand. These tribes are grouped into federations (قبيلة qabila). Within the tribe, there is the clan (الفخذ fukhdh), the house (البيت beit) and the extended family (الخمس khams). Tribal leaders, called sheikhs, represent their tribes and settle disputes, some of which cut across ethnic and sectarian lines. Many Arabs identify more strongly with their family and tribe than their national or religious affiliation. About 75 percent of Iraq’s population is either a member or close associate of one of the country’s approximately 150 tribes.

The tribes, which typically comprise family-based clans, have wielded strong influence in Iraq's modern history. In contemporary Iraq, tribes and tribalism are most prominent in the provinces (outside main urban regions), especially Sunni areas — Anbar, Salahadin, Kirkuk, Nineveh — and the southern provinces including Basra.

On its accession to power in the 17 July Revolution of 1968, Iraq's Ba'ath Party announced its opposition to tribalism ( القبلية ''al-qabaliyya''), although for pragmatic reasons, especially during the Iran–Iraq War, tribalism was sometimes tolerated and even encouraged.

== List of major tribes ==
- Al-Khafaji
- Al-Srai
- Al-Sari
- Al-Alattiya
- Al-Maliki
- Al-Qaraghoul
- Al-Khuza'ah
- Al-Shammari
- Al-Samraie
- Al-Azzawi
- Al-Huraithi
- Al-Absawi
- Al-Asooli
- Al-Dulaimi
- Al-Jubouri
- Al-Juaibar
- Al-Suwaidi
- Al-Amri
- Al-Nuaimi
- Al-Jumaili
- Al-Salaman
- Al-Naji
- Al-Kadhmi
- Al-Qarawi
- Al-Janabi
- Al-Wani
- Al-Ahmed
- Al-Kaabi
- Al-Anzi
- Al-Ubaid
- Al-Ali
- Al-Duraji
- Al-Khazail
- Al-Hasan
- Al-Khazraji
- Al-Lami
- Al-Malik
- Al-Muntafiq
- Al-Nasiri
- Al-Dhafeer
- Al-Musawi
- Al-Yasiri
- Al-Asadi
- Al-Salman
- Al-Zubaidi
- Al-Mutairi
- Al-Otaibi
- Al-Kilab
- Al-Bayati
- Al-Kaabi
- Al-Uqaydat
- Al-Bu Badri
- Al-Baggara
- Al-Rahabi
- Al-Talafha
- Al-Sawae'id
- Al-Manaseer
- Albu Badran
- Al-Harbi
- Al-Tai'ee
- Al-Sudani

Partial source:

== See also ==
- Iraqis
- Arabs
