= Kashif al-Ghita Family =

House of Kashif al-Ghita كاشف الغطاء
- Origin: Hillah, Iraq
- Founded: about 1790; 236 years ago in Najaf, Iraq
- Founder: Ja'far Kashif al-Ghita

The family of Kashif al-Ghita (Arabic: كاشف الغطاء), are an Iraqi religious Twelver Shia family that settled in Najaf, in the 13th A.H/19th A.D century.

== History and lineage ==
Kashif al-Ghita Family is attributed to the tribe of Bani Malik, one of the tribes in Iraq and they are now known as Al-Ali, which is attributed to Malik al-Ashtar (37 AH), one of the closest companions of Imam Ali ibn Abi Talib. That is why they were known as "Al-Maliki" as well. Their ancestors lived in Janajiyah, Janajiya, or Qenaqia from the villages of Hilla, Iraq. Therefore, Kashif al-Ghita Family also known as al-Janaji. In the late 12 century A.H (18 century A.D), the father of Ja'far Kashif al-Ghita' (Shaikh Khidhir ibn Mohammad ibn Yahya ibn Mutar ibn Saif Al-Deen Al-Janaji Al-Maliki) emigrated to Najaf, Iraq.

== Famous scholars ==
- Ja'far Kashif al-Ghita (b. 1156 A.H/1743 A.D – d. 1227 A.H/1812 A.D)
- Musa b. Ja'far Kashif al-Ghita (b. 1180 A.H/1766 A.D-1767 – d. 1243 A.H/1827 A.D)
- Ali b. Ja'far Kashif al-Ghita (b. 1197 A.H/1783 A.D– d. 1253 A.H/1838 A.D)
- Hasan b. Ja'far Kashif al-Ghita (b. 1201 A.H/1787 A.D– d. 1262 A.H/1846 A.D)
- Mahdi b. 'Ali Kashif al-Ghita (b. 1226 A.H/1812 A.D– d. 1289 A.H/1873 A.D)
- Muhammad Rida b. Musa Kashif al-Ghita (b. 1238 A.H/1822 A.D– d. 1297 A.H/1879 A.D)
- Abbas b. 'Ali Kashif al-Ghita (b. 1242 A.H/1827 A.D– d. 1315 A.H/1898 A.D)
- Abbas b. Hasan Kashif al-Ghita (b. 1253 A.H/1837 A.D– d. 1323 A.H/1905 A.D)
- Musa b. Muhammad Rida Kashif al-Ghita (b. 1260 A.H/1844 A.D– d. 1306 A.H/1888 A.D)
- Ali b. Muhammad Rida Kashif al-Ghita (b. 1267 A.H/1850 A.D– d. 1350 A.H/1931 A.D)
- Muhammad b. 'Ali Kashif al-Ghita (d. 1268 A.H/1851 A.D)
- Hadi b. 'Abbas Kashif al-Ghita (b. 1289 A.H/1872 A.D– d. 1361 A.H/1942 A.D)
- Murtada b. 'Abbas Kashif al-Ghita (b. 1291 A.H/1874 A.D– d. 1349 A.H/1930 A.D)
- Ahmad b. 'Ali Kashif al-Ghita (b. 1292 A.H/1875 A.D– d. 1344 A.H/1925 A.D)
- Muhammad Hussein Kashif al-Ghita (b. 1294 A.H/1877 A.D- d. 1373 A.H/1953 A.D), For further reading see: Muhammad Husayn Kashif al-Ghita
- Muhammad Rida b. Hadi Kashif al-Ghita (b. 1310 A.H/1892 A.D– d. 1366 A.H/1947 A.D)

== Kashif al-Ghita Library ==
The library is one of the ancient family libraries of Najaf that dates back to the end of the twelfth century AH (eighteenth century AD). Its roots go back to Sheikh Ja'far Kashif al-Ghita (author Kashif al-Ghita) who was a Shiite Marja' in thirteenth/nineteenth century, who died in (1228 AH / 1813 AD), After his death, His children and grandchildren preserved the library, and a large number of manuscripts and publications were added to the library, and it became one of the largest libraries in Najaf, the library contains many sections distributed among books of jurisprudence, fundamentals of jurisprudence, beliefs, philosophy, general sciences, books of hadith, biography, history, medicine and language books Rhetoric, grammar, translations, men's science (Biographical evaluation), the sciences of the Qur’an, logic, literature, poetry and others. According to kashifalgetaa foundation's website the number of books printed in the library reached 20000 books, and the library is distinguished by the presence of rare books that were printed in the fifties of the last century or earlier. Where there are rare first editions of the mothers of books, and the library receives many students of religious sciences and academic studies.
