= Abdul Amir Al-Anbari =

Iraqi diplomat

Abdul Amir Al-Anbari عبد الأمير الأنباري

Personal details
- Born: Hillah, Kingdom of Iraq
- Education: Baghdad University, Harvard University

Abdul Amir Ali Al-Anbari (born in Hillah) was an Iraqi official during the governments of Ahmed Hassan al-Bakr and Saddam Hussein.

== Career ==
He was an expert in international negotiations. He was appointed as the director of the Legal Department of the National Oil Company in 1967, then as deputy director-general for oil affairs in 1972, and acting director-general at the Ministry of Oil and Minerals in 1974. He later became chairman of the board of the Iraqi Fund for Foreign Development in 1978, and in 1987, he served as Iraq's ambassador to the United Kingdom and Ireland. He was also appointed as Iraq's extraordinary ambassador to the United States on October 20, 1987, and served as Iraq's permanent representative to the United Nations from August 6, 1990, until 1992.

Al-Anbari also played a key role as chief negotiator in the Oil-for-Food Program and served as Iraq's delegate to UNESCO in Paris. He was a member of the board of trustees at the Center for Arab Unity Studies and held the position of Iraq's ambassador to the Vatican in 2001. Al-Anbari graduated from Baghdad University and Harvard University.
