= Muhammad Hasan Abi al-Mahasin =

Iraqi poet and politician

Sheikh Muhammad-Hasan Abu al-Mahasin
- محمد حسن أبي المحاسن
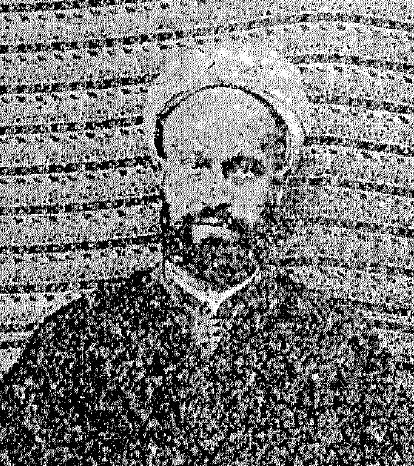

Personal life
- Born: 19 April 1875 Karbala, Ottoman Iraq
- Died: 1923 (aged 47–48) Karbala, Kingdom of Iraq
- Children: 6
- Parent: Hamadi al-Maliki (father)
- Relatives: Nouri al-Maliki (grandson)

Religious life
- Religion: Islam
- Jurisprudence: Twelver Shia Islam

Muslim leader
- Teacher: Mirza Taqi al-Shirazi

Sheikh Muhammad-Hasan Abi al-Mahasin al-Janaji al-Ha'eri (Arabic: الشيخ محمد حسن أبي المحاسن الجناجي الحائري; 1875–1923) was an Iraqi poet and politician. He was most famous for his participation in the Iraqi revolt of 1920.

== Early life and family ==
Abi al-Mahasin, was born in Karbala in 1874. His grandfather, Muhsin al-Maliki, was the first of the family to migrate from Janaja, Hilla to Karbala, residing in Janaja, al-Hindiya in the end of the 19th century. They also gained stature in the city, after marrying into the Nasrallah family. He is of the Albu Muhsin family of Al-Ghati offshoot of Al-Ali tribe, a branch of Bani Malik tribe.

== Biography ==
Abi al-Mahasin was one of the leaders of the Iraqi rebellion against the ottomans during and after the First World War. He became Mirza Taqi al-Shirazi's representative, by leading the Revolutionary Council (known as al-Majlis al-Milli; Arabic: المجلس الملي) in 1920.

He later became the Minister of Education in the first national government of the royal reign of King Faisal I after Iraq's independence in 1922.

== Works ==
Abi al-Mahasin was a renowned poet, and his student Sheikh Muhammad-Ali al-Yaqubi published his diwan for him in 1966, under the name Diwan Abi al-Mahasin al-Karbalaei.

Abi al-Mahasin wrote a lot of poetry on pan-Arabism, and the glory of the Arabs, and one of his famous lines includes:

فمتى تؤلف وحدة عربية
وطنيه الإصدار والإيراد
ليس العراق بموطني هو وحده
فبلاد قومي كلهن بلادي

Translation:

When will there be Arab unity,
A patriotic notion of giving and taking.
Iraq is not my country alone,
For the Arab nations are all my country

== Personal life ==
Abi al-Mahasin was married to the daughter of Sayyid Ali Nasrallah. He had six sons, Kamil, Muhammad-Husayn, Fadhil, Muhammad-Sharif, Abd al-Razzaq, and Mo'ein.

His grandson, Nouri al-Maliki, was the prime minister of Iraq from 2006 until 2014.

== See also ==
- Ja'far Abu al-Timman
- Shaalan Abu al-Jun
- Muhsin Abu-Tabikh
- Mirza Taqi al-Shirazi
- Nouri al-Maliki
