= Adnan al-Assadi =

Iraqi politician (1952–2021)

- Born: 1952 al-Rumaitha
- Occupation: Politician
- Political party: Islamic Dawa Party

Adnan al-Assadi (Arabic: عدنان الأسدي, 1952 – April 22, 2021) was an Iraqi politician. He was Iraq's deputy interior minister and acting minister of the interior. He was also Advisor to the Prime Minister for Security Affairs and a deputy in the Council of Representatives of Iraq for the province of Muthanna in its second session from 2010 to 2011 and third session from 2014 through 2018. He was re-elected in the 2018 Iraqi parliamentary election with 7,331 votes.

== Biography ==
Adnan al-Assadi was born in 1952 in al-Rumaitha in the province of Muthanna in southern Iraq. He obtained a diploma in pharmacy from the Institute of Higher Health in 1974. In the early 1980s he emigrated to Syria because of his opposition to the Ba'ath Party, and in 1988 he moved to Denmark. He returned to Iraq in 2003. After his return he was appointed a deputy member of the Iraqi Governing Council. In February 2004, he was the Deputy Minister of the Interior for Administrative Affairs, before assuming the post of Senior Deputy Minister of the Interior in 2006. He returned to the position of Deputy Minister of the Interior for Administrative and Financial Affairs in 2008.

In January 2010, he became a deputy in the Iraqi Council of Representatives after winning the 2010 Iraqi parliamentary election, but resigned in July 2011 to return to the position of Senior Deputy Minister of the Interior. In November 2014, Prime Minister Haider al-Abadi relieved him of his post and appointed him Advisor to the Prime Minister for Security Affairs. In January 2015 he was sworn in as a deputy in the Council of Representatives after winning the 2014 Iraqi parliamentary election with 43,081 votes, while remaining adviser to the prime minister.

Al-Assadi died from COVID-19 in April 2021.

== Works ==
- Political Variables in Iraq after 9/4/2003 (National Defense University 2009)
- Iraq's Foreign Policy towards the Arab Region 2005-2012 (Al-Mustansiriya University 2014)
