= Razzuq Ghannam =

Iraqi writer and journalist

Razzuq Dawood Ghannam was an Iraqi writer, journalist and newspaper proprietor. He founded the daily newspaper Al-Iraq in June 1920. The newspaper supported the British forces against the Iraqi revolt. It continued until its license was revoked by Nouri Said in 1932.
