= Al-Bu Badri =

Iraqi tribe

Bu Badri بو بدري
- Arab tribe
- Ethnicity: Arab
- Nisba: al-Badri
- Location: Iraq
- Population: 25,000
- Language: Arabic
- Religion: Sunni Islam
- Surnames: al-Badri - al-Samerai

Al-Badri is an Arab tribe in Iraq, predominantly based in Samarra, Diyala and Baghdad. It is mostly a Sunni tribe of around 25,000 but has a small Shia minority of about 1,500.

== History ==
The eponymous founder of the tribe, Badri bin Armoush, moved from Medina in modern-day Saudi Arabia to Samarra in Iraq in the 1700s. He married an Iraqi woman and had five sons.

== Modern history ==
Some notable members of this tribe are as follows:

- Ibrahim bin Awad bin Ibrahim ibn Ali ibn Mohammad bin Badri bin Armoush, commonly known as Abu Bakr al-Baghdadi, the deceased former leader of the Islamic State movement.
- Abd al-Aziz al-Badri, founder of the Iraqi branch of the international Islamic movement Hizb ut-Tahrir. Also close to the Muslim Brotherhood in Iraq. Executed in 1969 by the Ba'ath regime.
- Subhi al-Badri al-Samerai, Sunni Islamic scholar. He taught at the Iraqi University (formerly Islamic University).
- Haitham al-Badri, emir of Saladin Governorate for Tanzim Qaidat al-Jihad fi Bilad al-Rafidayn. Ordered the 2006 al-Askari mosque bombing.
