= Shaalan Abu al-Jun =

Iraqi politician

Sheikh Shaalan Abu al-Jun
- شعلان أبو الجون
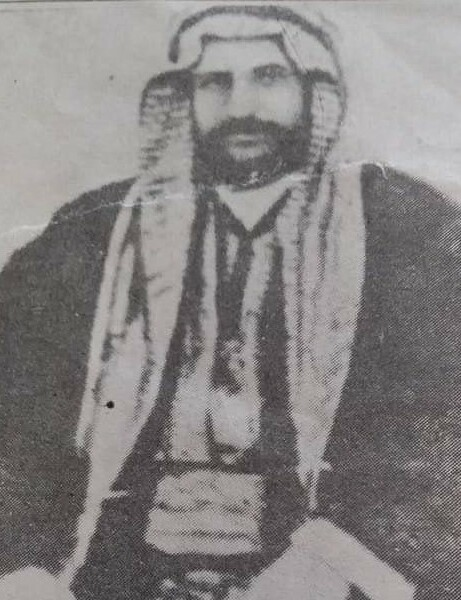

Personal details
- Born: 1864 Ottoman Iraq
- Died: 1930 (aged 65–66) Kingdom of Iraq
- Citizenship: Iraqi

Military service
- Battles/wars: Iraqi Revolt; Battle of Jisr al-Sawir; Battle of Al-Train 1920; Battle of Al-Bawakhe; Battle of Al-Khodar; Fall of Samawah

Sheikh Shaalan bin Inad Abu al-Jun (Arabic: شعلان بن عناد أبو الجون; 1864 – 29 January 1930), nicknamed Shaalan Al-Shahd (شعلان الشهد), was an Iraqi politician, and one of the leaders of the Iraqi revolt of 1920.

== Biography ==
Abu al-Jun was the head of Al-Zawalem tribe, one of the tribes of the city of Al-Rumaitha in southern Iraq. On 25 June 1920, Lieutenant P. T. Hyatt reported to the governor of Al Diwaniyah, Major Clive Kirkpatrick Daly, that Abu al-Jun was inciting the public to rebel against the British rule. Hence, Daly ordered his arrest and to be transported by rail to Al Diwaniyah.

On 30 June, he was summoned by deputy Hyatt in al-Rumaitha while having a meeting with his tribe members. Hyatt confronted Abu al-Jun who criticized the British treatment of the natives, and arrested him, based on allegations of refusing to pay an agricultural loan debt. Later that day at 4 pm, 1,200 men of the Zawalim tribe, under the leadership of Sheikh Ghathith al-Harjan from Hajim tribe, managed to revolt and rescue him from captivity at a train depot in Al-Rumaitha before extradition, killing a local Arab guard in the process, then they sabotaged the railway and telegraph communications in the town. This event marked the beginning of the Iraqi revolt of 1920.

== Government career ==
He held multiple positions in the Iraqi government that was created in the aftermath of the revolt.

== See also ==
- Muhammad Hasan Abi al-Mahasin
- Ja'far Abu al-Timman
- Muhsin Abu-Tabikh

== Sources ==
- Abdel Talib, Ibrahim (2015). Iraq, the Arab country that politicians gnawed at, 1914–2003 (in Arabic). Al Manhal. ISBN 9796500156422.
- Al-Haydari, Ibrahim (2017). The tragedy of Karbala (in Arabic). Dar al Saqi. ISBN 9786144253144.
- Basri, Mir (2004). Political figures in modern Iraq (in Arabic) (1st ed.). Dar Al-Hikmah. ISBN 9781904923114.
- Kadhim, Abbas (2012). Reclaiming Iraq: The 1920 Revolution and the Founding of the Modern State. University of Texas Press. ISBN 978-0-292-73924-6.
- Rutledge, Ian (2015). Enemy on the Euphrates: The Battle for Iraq, 1914–1921. Saqi. ISBN 9780863567674.
- Tauber, Eliezer (1995). The Formation of Modern Syria and Iraq. Taylor & Francis. ISBN 9781135201180.
