= Al-Khidr, Iraq =

City in Muthanna Governorate, Iraq

Al-Khodar الخضر
- Location in Iraq
- Coordinates: 31.2002°N 45.5532°E
- Country: Iraq
- Governate: Muthanna Governorate
- Founded: 1921

Population (2018)
  - Total: 42,800

Al-Khodar or Al-Khiḍr (Arabic: الخضر) is a city in Muthanna Governorate, southern Iraq, located next to the Euphrates. As of 2018, it has 42,800 inhabitants.

== Name ==
The city is named after the shrine of al-Khidr which is located there. Thousands of people come to the city every year to visit the shrine.

== Geography ==
The area of the city is approximately 1000 km^{2} (386 sq mi). It is located 27 kilometres (17 miles) southeast of Samawah.

== Demography ==
The city is inhabited by a number of Shia Arab tribes who participated in the Iraqi revolt against the British of 1920. Some of the most prominent tribes are the Bani Hajeem, Bani Sa'ad, and the al-'Aboud.

In 2009, the city had 34,597 inhabitants. By 2018, that number had increased to 42,800.

== Neighborhoods ==
- al-Sana'a
- al-Ansar
- al-Khodar al-Qadim
- al-'Askari
- al-Maqam
- al-'Asri
- al-Imam al-Hasan al-'Askari
- al-Bourisha
