= Aziz Al-Yasiri =

Iraqi politician (1945–2007)

Sayyid General Aziz Al-Yasiri
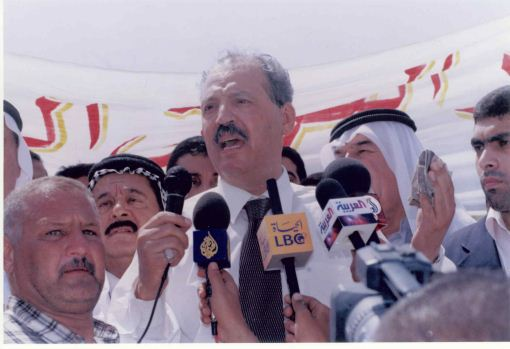

Personal details
- Born: 1 July 1945 Hilla, Iraq
- Died: 25 June 2007 (aged 61)
- Party: Democratic Iraqi Current
- Spouse: Raja Sami Nouri
- Education: Iraqi Military College

General Aziz Al-Yasiri was the Secretary General of the Iraqi Democratic Current.

== Early life and career ==
He was born on July 1, 1945, in Hilla, Babylon Province, Iraq, into the Al-Yasiri tribe. He began his career as a member of the Baath party in 1958, enlisting in the party at the age of 13. After his graduation from the Iraqi Military College in 1966, he moved on to become head of the Baath Party Military Office for the Central Euphrates Region. During this time, he undertook various missions to Berlin and Moscow.

== In exile ==
In August 1980, a year after Saddam Hussein took over the Presidency of Iraq, Lieutenant General Aziz Al-Yasiri left for Vienna, Austria, where he lived until American coalition forces invaded Iraq and toppled Saddam's regime in 2003. During his exile years, he made contacts with various anti-Saddam governments, including the British Foreign Office and the U.S. State Department. He participated in various conferences that prompted the toppling of Saddam Hussein's regime and the establishment of a democratic Iraq.

== Return to Iraq ==
In 2003, he founded the Democratic Iraqi Current party. With sectarian differences running high in Iraq and a closed system list which guaranteed large religious and sectarian parties a large number of seats, secular parties such as the Democratic Iraqi Current did not fare well in the Iraqi legislative election of 2005. Receiving only 8331 votes, or.10%. After his party's defeat, he went on to participate in changing the Iraqi voting system from a single, country-wide list to an open list, guaranteeing minorities proportionate seats roughly equal to their population numbers, regardless of voter turnout.

== Death ==
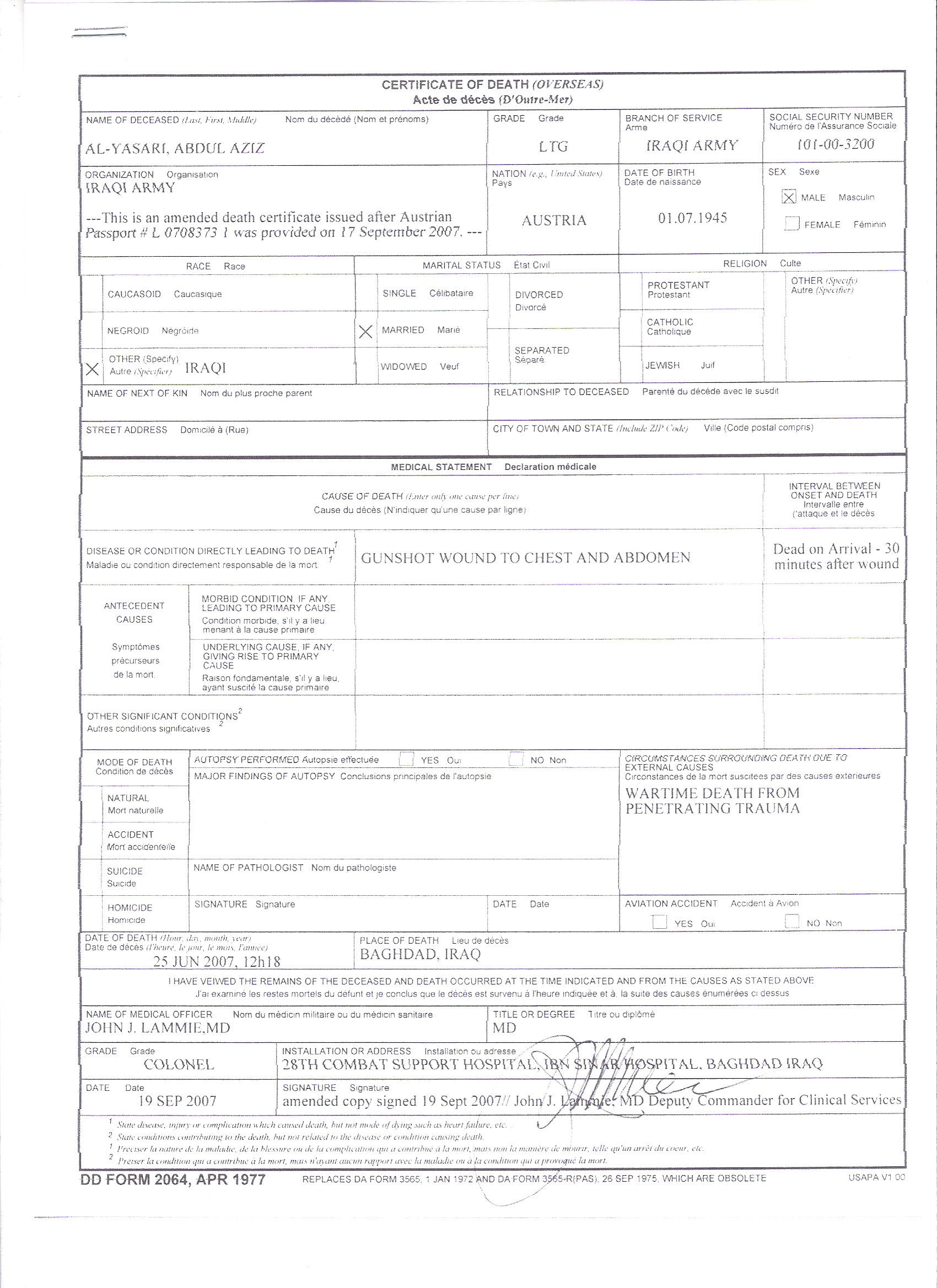
Death Certificate of Aziz Al-Yasiri, stating cause of death as gunshot wounds to chest and abdomen

Increasingly dissatisfied with the system, he tried to organize a vote of no-confidence against the government of Prime Minister Nouri al-Maliki after labelling his government as a “multi-party dictatorship.” On June 25, 2007, a suicide bomber blew himself up in the Baghdad Mansour Hotel lobby, killing Lieutenant General Aziz Al-Yasiri and former Anbar Governor Fassal Al-Guood, as well as prominent tribal sheiks from Anbar Province. These tribal sheiks, associated with the Anbar Salvation Council, had taken up arms against Al-Qaeda Iraq. Leftenent General Aziz Al-Yasiri was taken to Ibn Sina Hospital in Baghdad's Green Zone, where he was pronounced dead on arrival. Coalition Provisional Authority doctors gave the cause of death as two gunshots to the chest and abdomen. According to engineer Thoalfeqar Al-yasiri who worked in the Iraqi Ministry of Defense (MOD) Lieutenant General Aziz was murdered by the Post prime minister of Iraq Nouri al-Maliki.
