= Al-Yasiri =

Al-Yasiri (Arabic: الياسري) is a surname. Notable people with the surname include:

- Aziz Al-Yasiri (1945–2007), Iraqi politician
- Isa Hasan al-Yasiri (born 1942), Iraqi-Canadian poet
- Qays Abd al-Hussein al-Yasiri (1941–2019), Iraqi media historian
- Rafif al-Yasiri (1985–2018), Iraqi plastic surgeon and TV host doctor, writer, media personality
- Tawfiq al-Yasiri (died 2020), Iraqi military officer and politician
