= Muhsin Abu-Tabikh =

Iraqi politician

Sayyid Muhsin Abu-Tabikh
- محسن أبو طبيخ
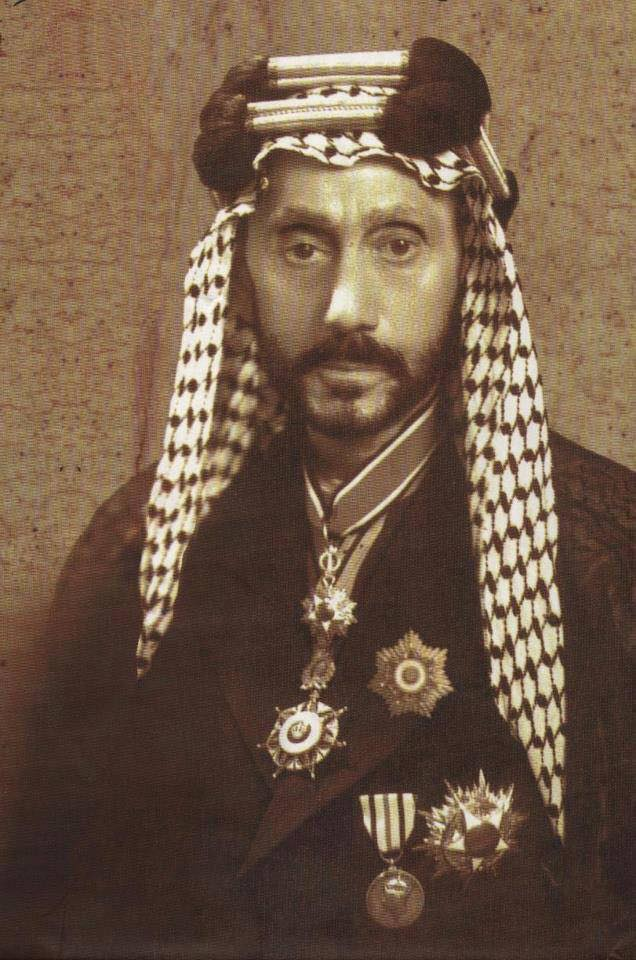

Personal details
- Born: 1878 Ghammas, Ottoman Iraq
- Died: 1961 (aged 82–83) Baghdad, Iraqi Republic

Military service
- Battles/wars: Iraqi Revolt: Battle Al-Train 1920; Battle of Al-Husseiniya River; Battle of Al-SiddhaHindi 1920; Fall of Najaf (surrendered)

Sayyid Muhsin bin Hassan bin Ali bin Idris (Arabic: السيد محسن بن حسن بن علي بن إدريس; 1878–1961), better known as Muhsin Abu-Tabikh (محسن أبو طبيخ), was a prominent Iraqi nationalist, and one of the leaders of the 1920 Iraqi Revolt.

== Biography ==
He was born in 1878 in Ghammas, a district of Diwaniyah Governorate in southern Iraq. Known for his contribution to the Iraqi revolution against British occupation. He fought with the Ottoman army against Britain in 1915. On October 6, 1920, it was decided by revolutionaries that a national government must be formed through an elected revolutionary council to oversee the areas liberated from the British. Abu-Tabikh was appointed the head of the new government, the administration was set up temporarily in Karbala. Celebrations took place in the city hall in the midst of crowds that exceeded tens of thousands, where he raised the first Iraqi flag in modern history.

== Land theft allegations ==
Abu-Tabikh and his father were alleged to have been guilty by the British Administration of stealing 30,000 acres of land from the Khaza'il family by allying with the Ottoman Administration to implement fraudulent deeds in their name, in order to diminish the control of the Banu Khuza'ah over their Kingdom in the Middle Euphrates.

== After the revolution ==
Abu-Tabikh was one of the members of the Iraqi delegation that arrived in Mecca on March 9, 1921, to meet with Sharif Hussein and ask him to appoint his son as king of Iraq. He accompanied Faisal I when he first arrived in Basra on June 23, 1921. After the formation of the Iraqi government, he moved his residence to Baghdad and married Saniyah Al-Sandoq, the sister of Iraqi archaeologist Izz al-Din Al-Sandoq. Under the monarchy, he was a member of the Iraqi senate until it was overthrown by the 1958 revolution. He stopped his political activity after the 1958 revolution, which had seized most of the agricultural lands that belonged to his family as part of agrarian reform law at that time. However, the republican revolutionaries had a great deal of respect and appreciation for him, and he remained a respected and honored figure in his old age. Muhsin Abu-Tabikh died in Baghdad in 1961.

== Name and family lineage ==
According to Jawad al-Shahristani he was the descendant of Sayyid Idris, who is considered the first to become known by the title “Abu-Tabikh” for feeding masses of people of his region in the Middle Euphrates. "Tabikh" means food, which is rice with meat in "the year of famine", he and his descendants became famous for this event and were given the title "Abu-Tabikh".

== Works ==
He authored the book Principles and Men and several memoir manuscripts which were collected by his son Jamil Abu-Tabikh into one book, the book was published under the title Memoirs of Sayyid Muhsin Abu-Tabikh 1910-1960, fifty years of Iraq's modern political history in which he described the 1920 revolution as "a sacred revolution; a great revolution that influenced history in a significant way." His evidence is that the revolution gave birth to the Iraqi state, which was the revolution's "highest goal".

== See also ==
- Ja'far Abu al-Timman
- Muhammad Hasan Abi al-Mahasin
- Shaalan Abu al-Jun
