= Al-Bayati =

Al-Bayati البياتي
- Iraqi tribe
- Nisba: al-Bayati
- Location: Iraq
- Parent tribe: Tayy (partially)
- Religion: Sunni and Shia Islam

Al-Bayati (Arabic: البياتي, romanized: al-Bayātī) is a surname. It is connected to the Iraqi al-Bayat tribe.

The tribe name is a regional name (like al-Tikriti) referring to the Bayat plains in central-north Iraq, in which numerous different tribes have settled, including ethnic Arab-identifying clans who claim descent from Tayy, along with some Turkmen-identifying clans who claim ancestry from the Oghuz Bayat tribe.

== Notable people ==
- Abbas al-Bayati, Iraqi Shiite politician
- Abd al-Wahhab Al-Bayati (1926–1999), Iraqi Arab poet
- Basil Al Bayati (1946), Iraqi architect
- Mohammed Mahdi al-Bayati (1962), Iraqi politician
- T. Hamid al Bayati, Iraqi diplomat, academic and author
