= Guardians of Independence =

1919 Iraqi anti-British political group

The Guardians of Independence (Arabic: حراس الاستقلال; Hurrās al-Istiqlāl) were a secretive, clandestine political group established in early 1919 to oppose the British occupation of Iraq following World War I. Ja'far Abu al-Timman was its main organizer and leader. The Guardians of Independence used both nationalist and religious rhetoric against the British presence and contributed greatly to the rise of emotions that led to the 1920 revolt. It called for Iraqi and Syrian independence, the establishment of a constitutional monarchy, and the rejection of technical or economic assistance from the British. It concentrated most of its activities in the central Euphrates and in Baghdad. Its leadership included a number of prominent religious and political figures: Sayyid Muhammad al-Sadr, Sayyid Muhammed Ali Bahrululoom, Shakir Mahmud, Hikmat Shawkat, Jalal Baban, and Muhamman Baqir al-Shabibi.

== See also ==
- Ja'far Abu al-Timman
- RAF Iraq Command
