= Ja'far Abu al-Timman =

Iraqi politician (1881 - 1945)

- محمد جعفر أبو التمن
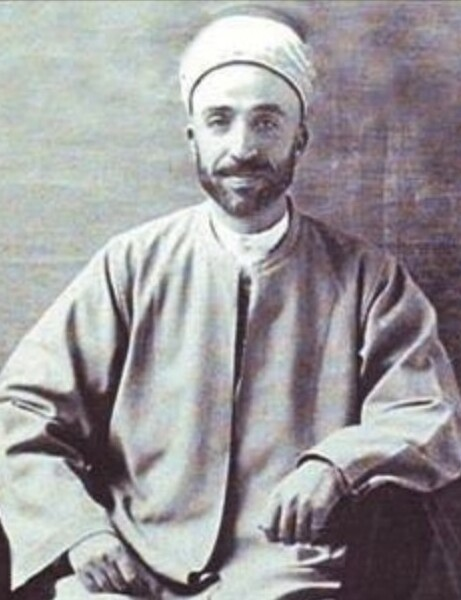

Personal details
- Born: 1881 Ottoman Iraq
- Died: 1945 Kingdom of Iraq
- Citizenship: Iraqi

Military service
- Battles/wars: Iraqi Revolt

Ja'far Abu al-Timman (Arabic: جعفر أبو التمن; 1881 – 11 November 1945) was an Iraqi revolutionary and politician, who was the leader of Haras al-Istiqlal (The Guardians of Independence).

== Early life and education ==
Ja'far Abu al-Timman was born in Baghdad, descending from the well-known Rabi’a tribe. Due to family disputes, his father traveled to Iran. As a result, Ja'far grew up and was raised in the house of his grandfather, a well-known merchant named Hajj Dawood who was famous for trading grains, especially rice. He supervised the young boy's education. He studied religious and jurisprudential sciences as well as poetry and literature in Kadhimiya. He wrote poetry in his youth, and in his middle years he edited economic magazine articles. Ja'far had also started solving complex matters of jurisprudence and Shari'a laws. This led him to become active in the secret political society Haras al-Istiqlal in late February 1919.

== Role in the Iraqi Revolt ==
Al-Timman was the leader of a political group that opposed the British administration of Iraq in 1919–1920. He contributed to the Iraqi revolution against British occupation. He participated in the organization of the 1920 uprising in Iraq, led the insurgents operating on the middle Euphrates and raised funds to fight against the British and develop the Iraqi national movement. He was a supporter of the creation of a fully independent Iraqi state and its joint rule by both Sunni Muslims and Shi'a Muslims. He opposed the establishment of a British mandate in Iraq. After suppressing the uprising, he fled to Iran, from where he returned after the coronation of Faisal I as King of Iraq. In 1922, he was forced to leave the country because he continued to demand the liberation of Iraq from British domination and the democratization of the country.

== Political career ==
He served as a chairman of the Iraqi National Party in 1922. He served as Minister of Commerce in the second cabinet of Abd al-Rahman al-Gillani. In the late 1920s, al-Timman realized the danger of sectarian blocs to the nation, so he took the initiative to categorically reject attempts to include him in political activity on a sectarian basis. Despite al-Timman being a devout Muslim, he promoted to separate religion from politics. When the prominent Shi'i scholar Muhammad Husayn Kashif al-Ghita' approached al-Timman in January 1927 to join the Shi'i Muslim bloc but he denied this issue because he did not want to associate religion with politics. Due to this, al-timman later devoted to his own political party: al-Hizb al-Watani (the Iraqi National Party.) The party was a prominent players between the 1920s and the first half of the 1930s in consolidating Iraqi national consciousness. Al-Timman began to be seen as a linking figure between Sunni Muslims and Shi'a Muslims. Al-Timman was working to bring the two groups together, as well as negotiating with the representatives of the Jewish and Christian communities due to Ja'far's promotion of a unified Iraqi nation.

Al-Timman would later ally himself with Yasin al-Hashimi, Naji al-Suwaidi, and the National Brotherhood Party (Al-Hizb al-Watani) in 1930. That same year, al-Timman boycotted the Iraqi elections of 1930 in protest against the Anglo-Iraqi Treaty. Al-Timman's political party, al-Hizb al-Watani, marched from their headquarters to the Haydar-Khana Mosque, a Baghdadi mosque known for its revolutionary activities, and assembled in it. Later, the police arrived and attempted to arrest and stop the crowd. The leaders of the protest were sentenced to six months in prison while some protestors were given three months. Although cases some were quickly discharged.

Also in 1935, at-Timman agreed to the plan of Hikmat Sulayman, who came to the belief that al-Ahali Party should forcibly overthrow the government of Yasin al-Hashimi and then reform Iraq from above, following the example of Kemal Atatürk's reforms. He supported Bakr Sidqi's military coup in 1936 and served as Minister of Finance in the cabinet of Hikmat Sulayman from 29 October 1936 until he resigned in June 1937. But then al-Timman's hopes for a deep reform of the country did not come true. He was disappointed by the attitude of Hikmat Sulaiman, who very quickly began to strive for more authority in power. Already in 1937, al-Timman and Kamil al-Chadirji left the government, protesting against the attitude of the prime minister, who resigned from the reforms previously demanded by al-Ahali. Additionally, al-Timman was outraged by the fact that Sulayman and Bakr Sidqi brutally suppressed the uprising of the Iraqi Shi'i Muslims. After that, he served as chairman of Baghdad Commerce Chamber from 1935 until 1945.

== Death ==
Al-Timman remained active in Iraqi politics until he died on 11 November 1945, in an explosion. His death shocked the Iraqi people, and a burial ceremony was held for him. There were meetings in schools, institutes, organizations and chambers of commerce to mourn his death. He was mourned from Abu Nuwas Street which was where he lived. The large mourning of Ja'far al-Timman showcased his wide popularity in Iraqi society at the time. Al-Timman was buried in the Wadi al-Salam cemetery in Najaf.

== See also ==
- Muhammad Hasan Abi al-Mahasin
- Shaalan Abu al-Jun
- Muhsin Abu-Tabikh
