= Najih al-Mamouri =

Iraqi writer (1944–2025)

- ناجح المعموري
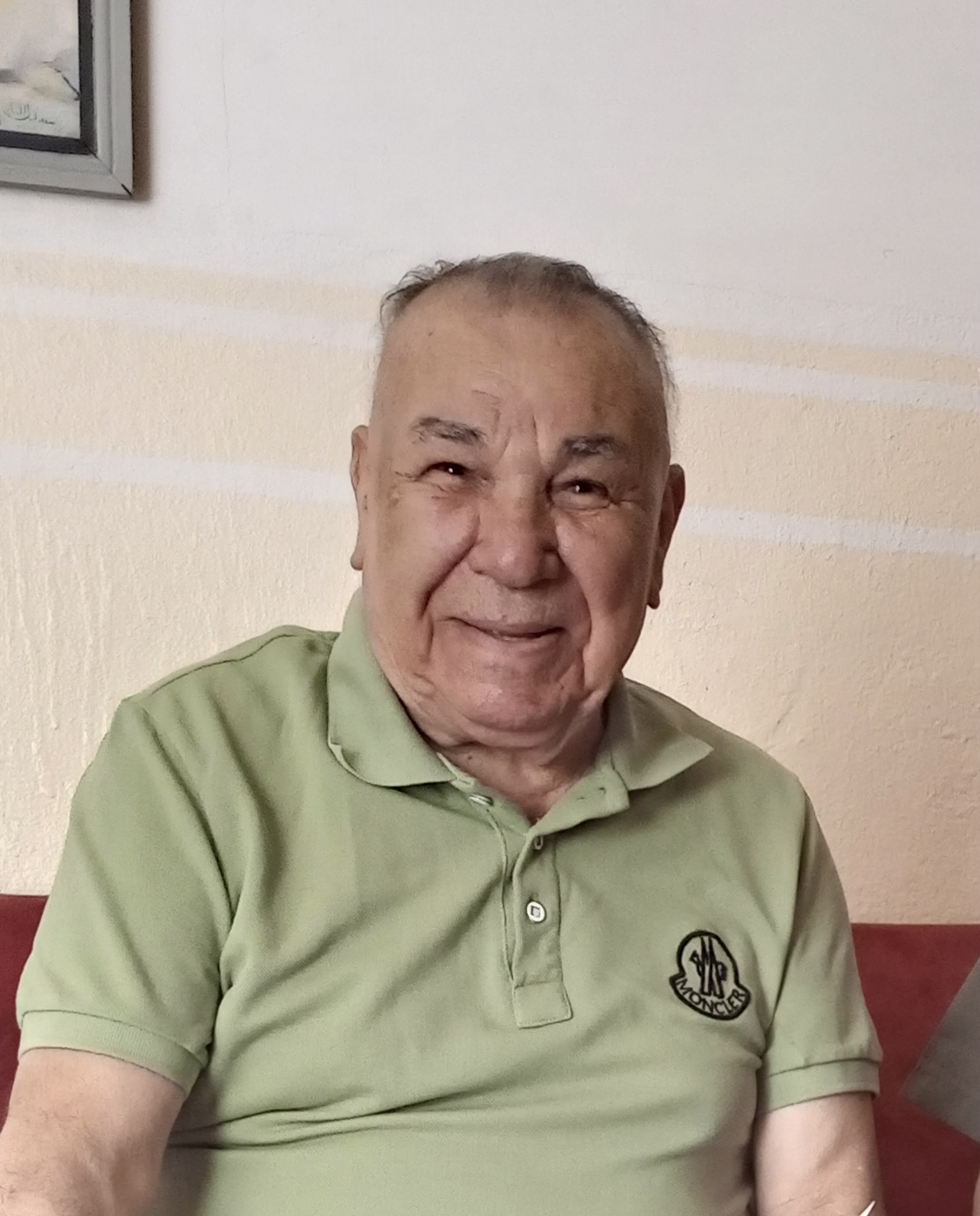
- Born: 1944; Hillah, Iraq
- Died: 24 December 2025 (aged 81)
- Known for: Short-story writer, novelist

Najih Hussein Nasser al-Mamouri (Arabic: ناجح حسين ناصر المعموري; 1944 – 24 December 2025) was an Iraqi short-story writer, novelist and researcher specialising in mythology and religion. He held a diploma in education.

== Life and career ==
Al-Mamouri was born in the village of Sinjar near the city of Hillah. He completed his primary and secondary education there, graduating with a diploma in education in 1963. He worked in the field of education until 1979, when political reasons led to his transfer to the Ministry of Labor and Social Affairs. He retired from this ministry in 1988.

Some of his notable works include Moses and the Myths of the East (2001), Myth and the Torah (2002), The Political Torah (2002), and Unpeeling the Myth (2012).

Al-Mamouri was elected head of the union Iraqi of Iraqi writers in 2025.

Al-Mamouri died on 24 December 2025, at the age of 81.
