= Subhi al-Badri al-Samerai =

Iraqi Islamic scholar

Subhi al-Badri al-Samarrai صبحي البدري السامرائي
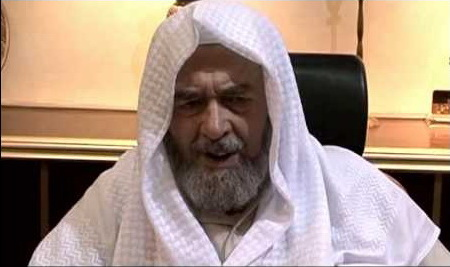
- A picture of Subhi al-Badri al-Samarrai

Personal life
- Born: 1936 Baghdad, Iraq
- Died: 25 June 2013 (aged 76–77) Beirut, Lebanon
- Main interest: Hadith
- Notable idea: Anti-Shi'ism
- Other name: Abu Abdul Rahman
- Occupation: Islamic scholar

Religious life
- Religion: Islam
- Denomination: Sunni
- Jurisprudence: Hanbali
- Creed: Athari
- Movement: Salafism

Muslim leader
- Influenced: Abu Bakr al-Baghdadi

Subhi bin Jassim bin Humaid al-Badri al-Samarrai (1936–2013) was a leading Iraqi muhaddith and one of the founders of the Salafi movement in Iraq.

== History ==
He was born in Al-Rusafa, Baghdad. He was a policeman between 1951 and his retirement in 1977. In the early 1980s, he moved to Saudi Arabia. He taught at Masjid al-Haram in Mecca, Saudi Arabia. He also lectured at Imam Muhammad ibn Saud Islamic University and King Abdulaziz University. He taught Abdur-Rahman al-Mu'allimee al-Yamani at this time. He was also an honorary member of Ahl al-Hadeeth University in Varanasi, India. He also occupied a position at the Permanent Committee for Islamic Research and Issuing Fatwas during his time in Mecca. At some point he lectured at the Faculty of Archaeological Science in Gehalm, Pakistan.

He returned to Iraq in the late 80's and served as an imam at a mosque in Baghdad. He used this position to preach virulently about the Shia, denouncing them as Rafida. While in Baghdad he served various mosques, studying and teaching in them, including Al-Rawi al-Muradiya mosque in Rusafa, Mosque of Haj Mahmoud, mosque of Burhanuddin Mullah Hammadi in Karkh, the Mosque of al-Hakiki, Al-Muradiya Mosque and mosque of 12 Rabie I.

He was part of the Association of Muslim Scholars and a friend of Muhammad Nasiruddin al-Albani who he traveled with in Jordan starting in 1991. He also knew Bin Baz, who said of him "this man (Subhi) is one of the remnants of the people of hadith in Iraq." He was a noted collector of Islamic manuscripts and traveled as far as Berlin, Dublin, and Princeton in search of them. He wrote over 54 books on Islamic theology during his lifetime. In 1989, he began teaching at the University of Islamic Sciences in Baghdad. He later supervised the study of Abu Bakr al-Baghdadi.

Between 1990 and 2003 he gained a bigger following as the government weakened and religious teachings began to spread widely. He left Iraq with his family after the 2003 invasion of Iraq by the United States. In 2009, he moved to Lebanon, where he died in 2013 at the American University of Beirut Medical Center.
