= Al-Ali tribe (Iraq) =

Ali آل علي
- Qahtanite Arab tribe
- Ethnicity: Arab
- Nisba: al-Ali
- Location: Iraq; United Arab Emirates
- Parent tribe: Bani Malik
- Language: Arabic
- Religion: Islam

Al-Ali (Arabic: آل علي) is a group of Arab clans who are not necessarily from a common ancestor but were once rulers of their own Arab state in Southern Persia and are still influential in Iraq and the United Arab Emirates as they are the ruling family in Umm al-Quwain. Many of whom are from an Arab tribe, a branch of Bani Malik from Central Arabia. Bani Malik are named after the renowned army leader, Malik Al-Ashtar Al-Nakha'i, and are a branch of Azd Mecca (the descendants of Khuza'a Ibn Amr). Azd Mecca are one of four branches of Azd (or Al-Azd), a major pre-Islamic tribes, a branch of Kahlan which was one of the branches of Qahtan the other being Himyar. Most of Al-Ali tribe migrated by the end of the 16th century from what is now Saudi Arabia to different neighboring countries. Members of Al-Ali tribe live in Saudi Arabia, UAE, Qatar, Kuwait, Bahrain, Iraq and Jordan.

== Al-Ali tribe in Iraq ==
The tribal pattern in Iraq for the last four centuries is such that tribes are grouped under different banners Rayat (رايات, sing. Raya) and areas of influence. These groups are not necessarily blood-related but they are tribal congregations, each one stems from its own ancestry and ruled by the Shaikh (شيخ), and cooperate in war under the same banner. However, two or three tribes (Asheera عشيرة pl. Ashayer) may have the same ancestry and cooperate in war under one banner and commanded by one leader who is called Shaikh of the shaikhs (Shaikh al Mashayikh شيخ المشايخ ). The shaikh's ancestors may not be the same as those of his tribe that he commands.

Any tribe can have the name of the bigger group or keeps its name. Individuals too can do the same e.g. one can be called Al-Maliki (related to Bani Malik, the bigger tribe) and at the same time he is called Al-Ali (related to Al- Ali), which is one of Bani Malik offshoots. Some members of Al-Ali tribe call themselves Bani Hasan (the sons of Hasan) which is another offshoot of Bani Malik.

This tribal system dates back to the pre-Islamic era.

=== Habits of Iraqi tribes ===
Every Shaikh of an Iraqi tribe has a guest-house called Madheef (مضيف) for hosting of the tribe's guests and refugees fleeing their tribe, recreation of the tribe members and a court room too.

A settler Arab tribe has its own order of penalties and fines, called Swani (صواني), for crimes committed on its territory, in contrast to nomadic ones.

== Al-Ali tribe ==
They are one of the offshoots of Bani Malik (بني مالك). In the 16th century they moved north from central Arabia to UAE, Qatar, Kuwait, Bahrain and Jordan, but others had relocated in Iraq as described. Al Ali tribe is known to be one of the richest tribes in the Middle East.

In the 13th century they had 4000 warriors, but most of the tribesmen had died in the plague of 1247 AH (1887 AD) so the number of their warriors was reduced to 150 in 1260 AH (1900). During the reign of their shaikh, Isa ibn Ehdaib, there was a severe drought which made them leave their land on the eastern bank of Euphrates and migrated near AI-Hindyiah tributary of Euphrates River, to the village called Janaja and some migrated to AI-Shamyiah to a place called AI-Kharabah which was offered by Shaikh Thirib ibn Emghamis Al-Khaza'ali. Many of AI-Ali's still live in that area around Um-Hayaya River in Najaf Governorate.

== Al-Ali offshoots ==
An offshoot is called Fakhd (فخذ)

- Al-Mahasna
- Al-Bkhair
- Al-Daoud
- Al-Hayachla
- Al-Faraj (Al-Ali): The largest fakhd, a tribe in its own right, and they kept the name of the main tribe. Faraj and Ali are brothers. This offshoot divides into:
- 1) Al-Gati آل كاطع- In Janaja village and the township of Al Hindiyah (also called Twairij) on the bank of Al-Hindyiah tributary of Euphrates River. Albu Haj Ali and Albu Muhsin dynasties are some of those who descended from Al Gati offshoot of Al Ali.
- 2) Al-Rowaj'ih
- 3) Al Shaiba
- 4) Al-Matareef
- 5) Another offshoot in the township of Al-Daghara, whose descendants are Kashif Al-Ghita'a and Al-Khidhir dynasties.

== Influential people of Al-Ali ==
=== Deceased ===
- Shaikh Khidhir ibn Mohammad ibn Yahya ibn Mutar ibn Saif Al-Deen Al-Janaji Al-Maliki, the great father of Al Kashif AI-Ghita'a family in Najaf.
- His son, Shaikh Ja'afar, who is the one given the title of Kashif Al-Ghita'a which means "the revealer of religion and knowledge".
- Shaikh Mohammad Hussein Kashif Al-Ghita'a, the philosopher and politician of the early 20th century and an author of many publications on theology, sociology and politics.
- Muhammad Hasan Abi al-Mahasin, a poet and a politician. He is one of the leaders of the Iraqi revolution against the British occupation during and after the First World War. He was the president of the Revolutionary Council then (Al-Majlis Al-Milli المجلس الملي) in 1920. He became the Minister of Education in the first national government during the reign of King Faisal I after independence in 1923. He is one of Albu Muhsin dynasty of Al Ghati offshoot of Al Ali. He is grandfather of Nouri al-Maliki, the former prime minister of Iraq (2006–2014).
- Shaikh Ali Kashif Al-Ghita'a, former president of the Islamic Conference Organization, a clergyman and author.
- Shaikh Rawi Al-Waddai, one of the leaders of the Iraqi revolution in 1920 and shaikh of Al Ali tribe then.
- Dr. Mahmoud Muhammad Hussein Al-Shaikh Ali, soil engineer and world class expert on geo-technology.
- Dhia Yahya Al-Ali, a high-ranking politician in Iraq and ex-governor of many governorates Iraq and MP until 2003.

=== Contemporaries ===
- Abdul-Muhsin Ali Al-Ali (born 1929), oil engineer. The eldest member of the tribe.
- Muneer Abdul-Munim Al-Ali (born 1944), urologist and transplantation surgeon. One of the pioneers of organ transplantation in the early seventies, in Iraq and the Arab world, who lived in New Zealand between 1997 and 1999 and settled in the UK in 1999. He is famous for publishing innovative articles in urology and transplantation and in 2013 authored his book, A Scientific Tafsir of Qur'anic Verses; Interplay of Faith, in Arabic and English. Has authored many other books on the subject of interaction between faith and science
- Nouri al-Maliki, (born 1950), grandson of Muhammad Hasan Abi al-Mahasin, of the Albu-Muhsin dynasty; Iraqi Prime Minister (2006–2014), the third prime minister after the overthrow of Saddam Hussain.

All above contemporaries are from the Al-Ghati offshoot of Al-Ali.

== Genealogy ==
The eldest member of the tribe, Abdul-Muhsin (brother of Abdul-Munim), Ibn Ali, lbn Hussein (brother of Al-Shaikh-Ali), Ibn Hammadi, Ibn Haj-Ali, Ibn Mohammad, lbn Muhanna, lbn Hussein ( brother of Sultan, the ancestor of Muhammad Hasan Abi Al-Mahasin), lbn Ghati, lbn Saif Al-Deen (AI-Maliki), lbn Ehdaib, lbn Hirkil, Ibn ALI (after whom the tribe is named), lbn Sagr, Ibn Woram, Ibn Abi Firas, Ibn Hamdan, Ibn Hamdan, Ibn Khoulan, Ibn Abdulla, Ibn Malik (Al-Nua’man), Ibn Ibrahim, Ibn Malik Al-Ashtar ( leader of the army of Ali Ibn Abi Talib, the cousin of Muhammad and his son-in-law), after whom the larger Bani Malik tribe are named), Ibn Al-Harith, Ibn Abed Yaghouth, Ibn Salama, Ibn Rabia’a, Ibn Al-Harith, Ibn, Juthaima, Ibn Sa’ad, Ibn Malik, Ibn Nakha’, Ibn Amr, Ibn Illa, Ibn Jalid, Ibn Madh’hij (Nakha’ were pagans who converted to Islam after they were defeated by an Islamic army led by Ali Ibn Abi Talib in Ramadhan in 10 AH, and apparently Madh'hij's lineage had been relinquished by the tribe due to the infamy of the aforementioned battle, to be replaced with Azd's tribe, his brother, whose branch in Mecca was then named after his grandson" Khuza’a" Ibn Amr, Ibn Luhayy, Ibn Haritha, Ibn Amr, Ibn Muzaiqiya, from the dynasty of Ibn Al-Ghouth, Ibn Nabt, Ibn Malik, Ibn Zaid, Ibn Kahlan, Ibn Abed Shams “Saba'a (Sheba) The Great”, who is the founder of Sheba kingdom (Arabic 'Saba'a, which Queen Balkis "Queen of Sheba" who ruled in the 10th century BC, Ibn Yashjub, Ibn Yarub the forefather of the indigenous Arabs of the Arabian peninsula after whom the Arabs are named), lbn Qahtan(biblical Joktan) who is the son of Hud (biblical Eber).

== Al-Azd branches ==
Al-Azd tribe is one of the major pre-Islamic Arab tribes.

Sons of Amr Ibn Muzaiqiya have led their branches of Al-Azd in 3rd century AD to various destinations, after the flooding of their city Ma'Arab, when its dam had been destroyed by a deluge:

1. Azd Mecca (Khuza'a) - descendants of Haritha Ibn Amr Ibn Muzaiqiya, who settled in Hejaz and Mecca. They were the custodians of Ka'aba

(Holy House) prior to Quraysh tribe, for 300 yrs. some say for 500 yrs. They allied with Muhammad, so that a Qur'anic verse had

favoured them (Al-Tawba, Verse 14).

2. Azd Oman– descendants of Imran Ibn Amr Ibn Muzaiqiya, who were established in western Arabia and invaded Karman and Shiraz in southern

Persia.

3. Ghassanids who are (Azd Syria) – descendants of Jafna Ibn Amr Ibn Muzaiqiya, who make the majority of the Arab Christians in Syria and

Lebanon.

4. Azd Yathrib – descendants of Tha’laba Ibn Amr Ibn Muzaiqiya, of his seed are Al-Aws and Al-Khazraj descendants of his son Haritha who are

collectively called Ansar (Arabic for supporters of Muhammad.

== Influential people of various branches of Al-Azd ==
- Juwayriah Bint Al-Harith, wife of Muhammad.
- Jameela Bint Adwan Al-Bariqi, wife of Malik Ibn Al-Nadhr, the 11th grandfather of Muhammad, and mother of Fahr Ibn Malik, his 10th grandfather.
- The Ghassanids of Syria., whose descendants are:
- 1- The Roman Emperor (Philip the Arab), a Ghassanid Arab from Syria, ruled between 244 and 249 AD.
- 2- The Byzantine Emperor Leo III the Isaurian also known as the Syrian, ruled between 717 and 741 AD.
- 3- The Nasrid Dynasty, ruled Granada between 1232 and 1492, the last Arab dynasty in Andalus (now Spain).
- 4- The Xiberras (Gebara/Sceberras) nobility of Malta (Christian Ghassanid migrants from Alexandria in Egypt
- 5- Maurice Xiberras the deputy prime minister and first leader of the Democratic Party of British Gibraltar. He is of the Maltese nobility(Sceberras /Gebara).
- The Muscati Maltese nobility Siculo, Musact family. Joseph Muscat the Maltese Prime Minister(since 2013) is one of them, are of Arab origin (Azd Oman) converted to Christianity in the 12th century.
- Malik Ibn Fahm Al-Azdi, King of Oman, Bahrain and Iraq.
- Abu Hurayra, famous narrator of Hadith, and his mother.
- Um Iban, wife of Caliph Uthman Ibn Affan
- Mohalib Ibn Abi Suffrah, military commander of Persia and Arabia at the time of Umayyad caliphate, leader of the Islamic forays into India and Sindh.
- Jabir Ibn Hayyan, a famous alchemist and mathematician ( after whose name is Algebra ).
- Ibn Duraid Al-Azdi, poet.
- Khalil Ibn Ahmad Al-Farahidi, author of the first Arabic dictionary (Kitab Al-Ayn), and the teacher of the celebrated Arabic linguist Sibawayh.
- Kuthayyir, poet and legendary lover, called Kuthayyir of Azza (his sweetheart), reminiscent of Romeo and Juliet.
- Ibn al-Banna, mathematician and astronomer
- Jabir ibn Zayd Al-Azdi, the co-founder of the Ibadhi sect of Islam.
- Al- Bu Sa'id dynasty ruling Oman. Sultan of Oman, Qaboos bin Said Al Said is the 14th-generation descendant of the founder of the dynasty Said bin Sultan
