= Ahmad al-Safi al-Najafi =

Iraqi poet

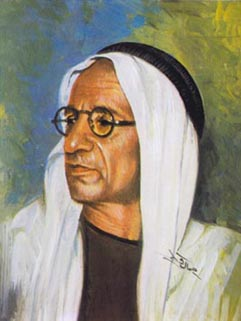

Ahmad al-Safi al-Najafi (1897 – 27 June 1977) was an Iraqi poet, "a poet of extreme simplicity of style and a poetic diction that often approximates to ordinary speech".

Ahmad al-Safi was born in Najaf to an Iraqi father and a Lebanese mother. From 1920 to 1927 he left Iraq for Iran. He met Jamil Sidqi al-Zahawi in 1927, who declared he was proud to have "discovered" him. In 1929, illness drove him to leave Iraq for a milder climate in Syria. In 1933, he left the country again for Lebanon, where he lived until a year before his death. Involved in resistance against the British colonial occupation since the 1920s, he was arrested for his anti-colonial stance in 1941. In 1976 he returned to Iraq, having been wounded in the Lebanese Civil War. He died on the 27 June 1977.

In November 2011 plans were announced to erect a memorial to him in Najaf.

== Works ==
- Al-Amwāj [The Waves], 1932
