= Al-Khafaji =

Al-Khafaji (Arabic: االخفاجي) is an Arabic surname that denotes a relationship to or from Khafajah, Diyala Governorate. Notable people with the surname include:

- Raschad Al-Khafaji (born 1970) UN Diplomat
- Ala'a Hussein Ali Al-Khafaji Al-Jaber (born c. 1948), Kuwaiti politician
- Mohammed Al-Khafaji (born 1994), Iraqi rower
- Muhsin Khidr al-Khafaji (1945–2017), Iraqi politician
- Abdul-ameer Mohammed Ali al-Khafaji, well known lawyer and previous UNESCO rep
- Ghalib al-Khafaji, martyr
- Shihab al-Din al-Khafaji (1569–1659), Egyptian imam
