= Iraqi Revolt =

Iraqi uprising against British rule

Iraqi Revolt of 1920 ثورة العشرين Thawrat al-'Ishreen
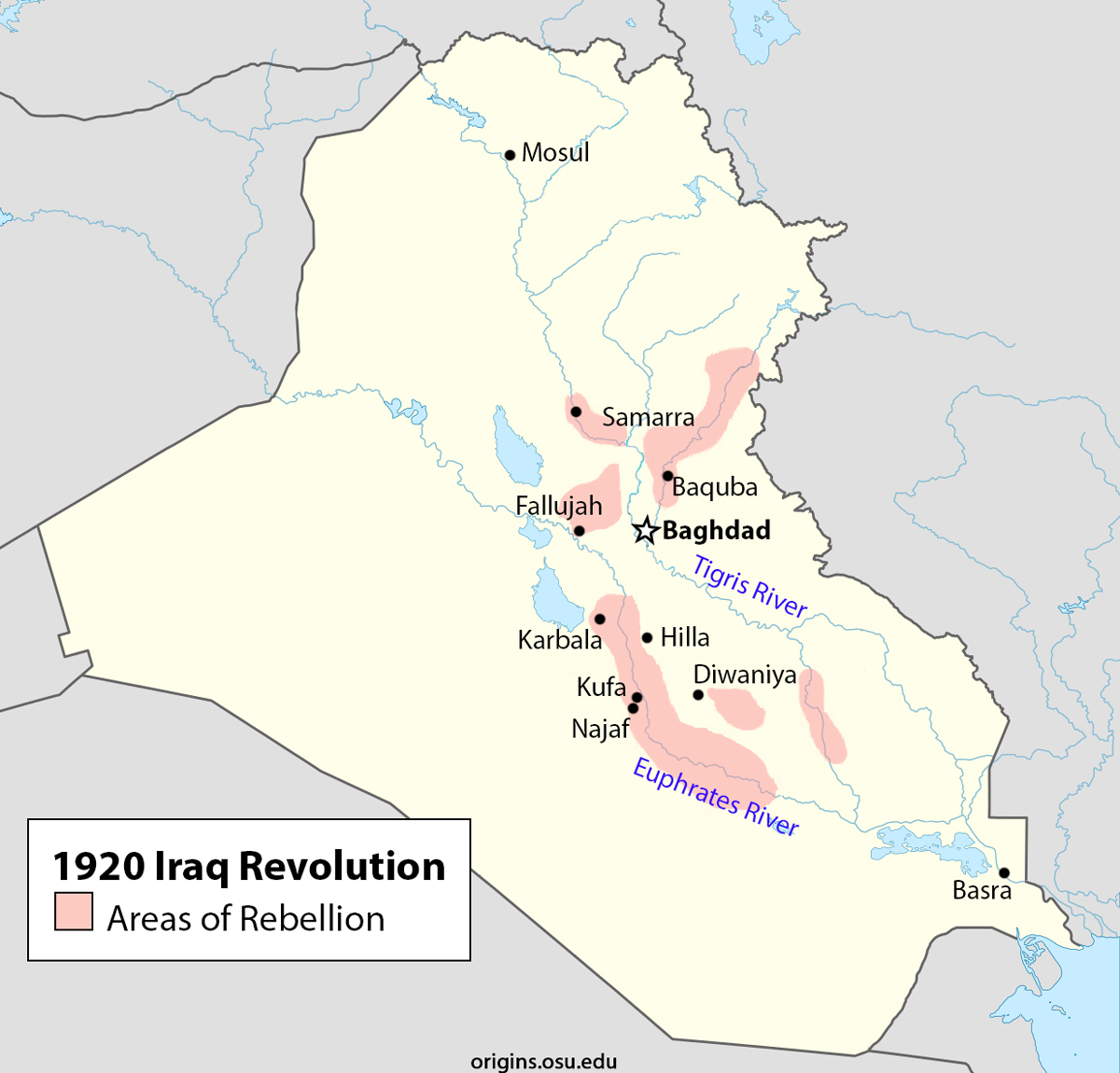
Date	May–October 1920 (5 months)
Location	OETA
Result	British victory (See § Aftermath): Anglo-Iraqi treaty; Greater autonomy given to Iraq; Faysal ibn Husayn installed as King; British Mandate for Mesopotamia cancelled
Territorial changes	Establishment of the Kingdom of Iraq under British Administration

Belligerents
(United Kingdom of Great Britain and Ireland) United Kingdom: Assyrian Levies	Iraqi rebels: Al-ʽAhd; Hurras Al-Istiqlal; Arab tribesmen
	Kurdish tribesmen

Commanders and leaders
(United Kingdom of Great Britain and Ireland) Sir Arnold Wilson (United Kingdom of Great Britain and Ireland) Clive Kirkpatrick Daly (United Kingdom of Great Britain and Ireland) Gerard Leachman †	Muhsin Abu-Tabikh; Ja'far Abu al-Timman; Shaalan Abu al-Jun; Muhammad Hasan Abi al-Mahasin; Mirza Taqi al-Shirazi; Mirza Mahdi al-Shirazi; Mehdi Al-Khalissi (WIA); Dhari ibn Mahmud; Habib al-Khaizaran; Omar al-Alwan; Other heads of Iraqi tribesmen

Strength
60,200 (26,000 noncombatants)–120,000 (later reinforced with an additional 15,414 men); 63 aircraft	131,000

Casualties and losses
500–1,000 killed 1,100–1,800 wounded 11 aircraft destroyed 600 missing	2,050–10,000 killed 4,800–6,150 wounded

The Iraqi Revolt of 1920, also known as the Iraqi War of Independence or Great Iraqi Revolution began in Baghdad in the summer of 1920 with mass demonstrations by Iraqis, including protests by embittered officers from the old Ottoman Army, against the British who published the new land ownership and the burial taxes at Najaf. The revolt gained momentum when it spread to the middle and lower Euphrates.

Shia and Sunni religious communities cooperated during the revolution as well as tribal communities, the urban masses, and many Iraqi officers in Syria. The objectives of the revolution were independence from British rule and the creation of an Arab government. The revolt achieved some initial success, but by the end of October 1920, the uprising was suppressed by the British, although elements of it dragged on until 1922.

== Background ==
Through March–May 1918, an anti-British rebellion took place in the Iraqi city of Najaf, which is often seen as a precursor to the 1920 Iraqi revolt.

After the Peace Treaty of Versailles in 1919 after World War I, the idea put forward by the League of Nations to create mandates for the territories that the defeated Central Powers had occupied began to take shape. The principle was that the territories should eventually become independent, albeit under the tutelage of one of the victorious Entente countries. People in Ottoman provinces began to fear the Mandate concept since "it seemed to suggest European imperial rule by another name".

At the San Remo Conference in April 1920, Britain was awarded the Mandate for Mesopotamia, as Iraq was called in the Western world and a mandate for Palestine. In Iraq, the British administration fired most of the former Ottoman officials, and the new administration had mainly British officials. Many Iraqis began to fear that Iraq would be incorporated into the British Empire. One of the most eminent Shia mujtahid, Ayatollah Muhammad Taqi al-Shirazi, then issued a fatwa "declaring that service in the British administration was unlawful". There was growing resentment toward new British policies, such as new land ownership laws. This upset tribal leaders, especially when it came to a new tax for burial in the Wadi-us-Salaam Cemetery in Najaf, where Shia from worldwide came to be buried. Meetings between Shia ulema and tribal leaders discussed strategies for peaceful protests, but they considered violent action if they failed to get results.

== Revolution ==
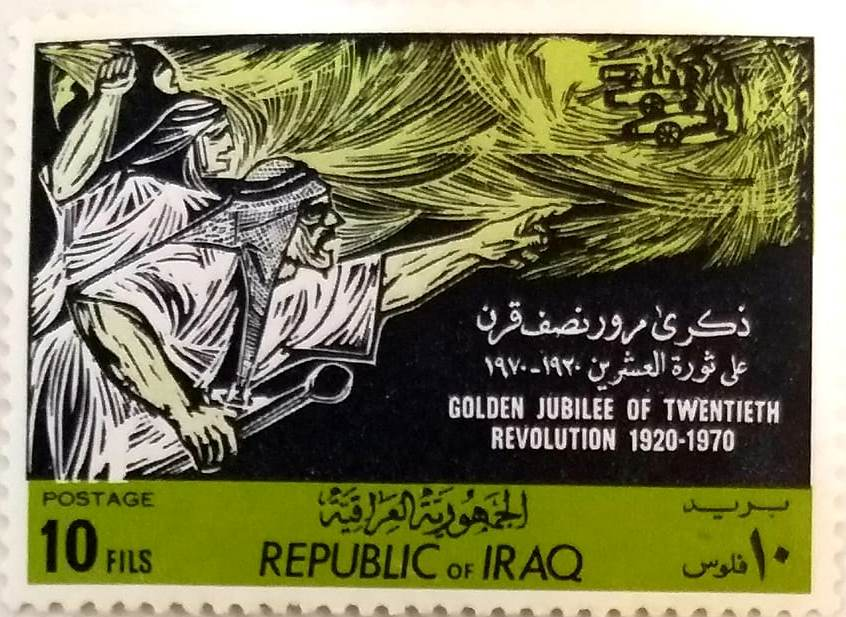
An Iraqi postage stamp of 10 fils denomination issued in 1970 on the occasion of the 50th anniversary of the 1920 Revolution

Discontent with British rule materialised in May 1920 with the onset of mass meetings and demonstrations in Baghdad. The start of the revolution was centred on peaceful protests against British rule. There were large gatherings at both Sunni and Shia mosques, which showed that cooperation between the two main sects of Iraqi society was possible. At one of the larger meetings, 15 representatives were nominated to present the case for Iraqi independence to the British officials. Acting Civil Commissioner, Arnold Wilson, dismissed their demands as impractical.

An armed revolt broke out in late June 1920. Ayatollah al-Shirazi issued another fatwa which read, "It is the duty of the Iraqis to demand their rights. In demanding them they should maintain peace and order. But if the English prevent them from obtaining their rights it is permitted to make use of defensive force." This seemed to encourage armed revolt. The British authorities tried to counter this by arresting a sheikh of the Zawalim tribe. Later, an armed band of loyal tribal warriors stormed the prison and set him free. The revolt soon gained momentum as the British garrisons in the mid-Euphrates region were weak and the armed tribes much stronger. By late July, the armed tribal rebels controlled most of the mid-Euphrates region. The success of the tribes caused the revolt to spread to the lower Euphrates and all around Baghdad.

The British War Secretary, Winston Churchill, authorised immediate reinforcements from Iran that included two squadrons of the Royal Air Force. The use of aircraft shifted the advantage to the British and played a huge role in ending the revolt. Some tribes worked against the revolt since they were recognised by the British authorities and profited from the acknowledgement. Eventually, the rebels began to run low on supplies and funding and could not support the revolt for much longer, and the British forces had become more effective. The revolt ended in October 1920, when the rebels surrendered Najaf and Karbala to the British authorities.

=== Beginning ===
==== Al-Rumaitha Incident ====
After the Revolution was declared in Baghdad, it spread to the south, notably to Al-Rumaitha. The Dhuwalim (Or Zawalim) Tribe, which was led by Sheikh Shaalan Abu al-Jun, declared war against the British and advocated for the independence of Iraq. The governor of Al Diwaniyah, Major Clive Kirkpatrick Daly, had instructed deputy Lieutenant P. T. Hyatt in al-Rumaitha to arrest him, which caused the Zawalim Tribe, under the leadership of Sheikh Ghathith Harjan, to revolt and rescue him from prison.

The British were worried that the incident in al Rumaitha would spread to other parts of the region, and would become a widespread issue. It was theorised that the uprising was orchestrated by outsiders from Najaf, who opposed the British Mandate, rather than it being a general attack against the British administration.

==== Declaration of the Revolution in the South ====
The arrest of Sheikh Shaalan Abu al-Jun had caused unrest. It resulted in his followers wrecking railway systems and other infrastructure, such as bridges. The attacks were supported by various Iraqi officers, which made the attacks appear to be well-coordinated and potent. The group of rebels grew and got more support. A few of the leaders (shuyukh) of the rebellion assembled on the 11th of July 1920 and wrote a letter to the district's British Political Officer, in which they requested for Iraq to gain independence. This request was denied, and the leaders declared a revolt as a response.

=== The Samawah Front ===
==== Battle of Al-Khodar ====
Al-Khodar is a small village on the left bank of the Euphrates River. On 30 July, Hadi al-Maqoutar arrived from the city of Najaf to incite the inhabitants of the village to join the revolt. He succeeded, as the tribes living in that area began to sabotage the railway and telegraph lines passing through the area. The commander of the British forces in Iraq, General Haldane, ordered the forces stationed at the Khadr train station to withdraw immediately to the city of Nasiriyah, where the tribes that joined the revolution then attacked the station. This was on 13 August, when they were shooting towards the station. The station had a regular train and two armoured trains, but soon, an incident happened to the first armoured vehicle, which led to a problem. The British troops went by regular train only, and the train arrived at Ur's station safely in the same evening.

==== Battle of Al-Bawakher ====
The guards of the city of Samawah were divided into two sections, one of which was led by Colonel "Hai" and camped on the river in a place called Hsija coast near the city and the second was led by Captain "Rasel" and encamped around the city train station that was near the city wall. Both sections became encircled after the British withdrew from the village of Al-Khoder and the rebels tightened the siege on them day after day. On 26 August, three warships and two regular ships moved from Nasiriyah to rescue the forces in Samawah. After fierce battles between the rebels and the ships, two warships and a regular ship reached the Samawah guards after the withdrawal of one of the warships on 27 August and returned to Nasiriyah. The rebels managed to seize one of the regular ships. The station fell into the hands of the rebels after fierce battles between them and the British forces when the British forces tried to get out of the station camp by train, a large number of bodies fell from both sides during the confrontations. After this battle, the rebels besieged the main guards camp, which was led by Colonel Hai and asked him to surrender, but Colonel Hai rejected the request. The siege lasted for about two months until they were rescued on 14 November.

==== The Fall of Samawah to the British ====
The commander of the British forces in Iraq sent a telegram to General Kongham, who was busy quelling the rebellion in the Diyala region, asking him to return to Baghdad on 16 September. On 1 October, General Kongham moved his forces from the city of Ur, heading north. On the sixth of that month, he arrived at Al-Khoder, where he was able to occupy it after he encountered resistance from the rebels. While moving towards the city of Samawah, the British forces burned down the villages on both sides of the Euphrates River near the town of Al-Khoder. On the 12th of the same month, the British forces arrived near Samawah and approached the city on the next day, where they faced strong resistance from the rebels stationed around the city. After a fierce battle, the rebels withdrew from their fortified positions. On the 14th day, when the British troops entered the city facing no resistance, they broke the siege of the British forces, which were confined to the coast of Hassija near the city. On the 12th of November, a battle took place between the British forces and the rebels of Bani Hajim clans at Sawir Bridge, also known as the Imam Abdullah Bridge, located 6 km north of the city of Samawah, in which 50 people were killed and more wounded. The number of British deaths was between 40 and 50. Due to this battle, General Kongham summoned a person named Mr Mohamed to negotiate with the Bani Hejim tribes. After negotiations between the two sides, an agreement on the conditions of withdrawal was finally signed in the city of Samawah between the parties on 20 November with the Bani Hajim and Fakhoudha tribes. Al-Rumaitha town was handed over after signing this agreement between the two parties. It should also be noted that the British did not arrest any of the elders of Bani Hajim.

=== Situation within Karbala ===
A key part of the revolt took place in Karbala, with families from all segments of society fighting together, such as the Al-Awad and the Koumouna families. All of them were united by a proclamation to stand together and fight for their right to an independent nation. The faction led by the Al-Awad and Koumouna families fought to establish Islamic rule throughout Iraq. In addition to the families fighting, the Shi'ite tribes encouraged the people to keep resisting British rule. Both factions fought ruthlessly and fought the British effectively. This was the strongest resistance the British had encountered. The Al-Awad family was often mentioned by Gertrude Bell in her letters, such as those sent from Baghdad. There was great carnage in Karbala, and many families were sent to prison camps on various islands. Some returned, but many did not survive. Women and their children were alone; their men were missing, some ran away to seek refuge, and many gathered in their houses, so if they died, they all died at once. Some families and militiamen agreed with the British that they would be rewarded with land and beautiful houses if they fought on the British side.

=== The fight in Najaf ===
A force from the Bani Hassan clan took control of the Kifl region south of Hilla, calling on the occupying authorities to send a large force called Bertil. Orders were issued to shoot at them when the revolutionaries appeared. The revolutionaries inferred the location of the force; they tried to crawl over them. The British forces suffered heavy losses, after which they issued orders to withdraw.

One of the results of that battle was the evacuation of the British from many regions in Musayyib and Hindi and the joining of the clans of Daghara and Afaf, and the liberation of the rest of the surrounding areas. The rebel clans advanced toward the Tahmaziyya, and in the meantime, the Bani Hassan tribe managed to liberate the region of Toureej without resistance. The rebel tribes were headed by Umran Saadoun al-Abbasi. The revolutionaries were subjected to bombing by British aircraft and other types of weapons. The masses of the rebel clans headed to the Siddat al-Hindi. The British military commander considered this a threat to Baghdad, especially after the rebels attacked the railway from Hilla to Baghdad and Bani Hassan sank the gunboat HMS Firefly in the Euphrates.

=== British forces and the Rebels in Diyala ===
The British failed to keep the revolt confined to the southern and central parts of the Euphrates region. Tribes along the Diyala River, which is in the northwestern part, had joined the revolt around late July. Their participation was fueled by a tactic of the rebels, in which they sent out 'messengers' to other parts of the country to spread the news of rebellion. The most prominent tribe in the Diyala region at the time was the 'Azza. Their sheikh, Habib al-Khayizran, was apprehensive of the hazardous venture. However, he was arrested not long after, and soon after his release he expressed his support of the revolt. Diyala had a vital geographical position at the time, as many railways to Persia crossed through it. This line was swiftly cut off by the rebels.

==== Battles of the Assyrians ====
As the Assyrian manned force became more disciplined they rendered excellent service; during the Arab rebellion of the 1920s, they displayed, under conditions of the greatest trial, steadfast loyalty to their British officers.

In 1920, the Assyrians had given proof of their great discipline and fighting qualities when the Assyrian camps at Mindan and Baquba were attacked by Arab forces, with the Assyrians defeating and driving off the Arabs.

British officers claim the Assyrians were veterans and skilled against their enemies, most of the men who signed up to the British army were indeed veterans from the Assyrian war of independence. One officer believes the reason that the Assyrians displayed such excellence was due to the Assyrians believing that they would be given independence after the revolution by the British.

==== Influence in Kurdistan ====
At the end of July, the majority of the southern and mid-Euphrates area was controlled by the rebels. This inspired Kurds in southern Kurdistan to start a rebellion of their own. They succeeded in seizing a number of towns, but the insurgency quickly fizzled out, as they proved to lack a unifying force. Most leaders were content to fall under British rule, as it provided them with a bureaucratic and consistent system. They eventually faltered on choosing a single leader, and lacked communication when it came to organising a successful revolution.

==== Rebels taking control of Shahrban ====
It was announced in the town of Shahraban (Miqdadiyah) on 14 August, where Bani Tamim clan attacked the town, people of the town have cooperated with the clan as happened in the town of Khalis, but the governmental Sarai, where the British and the soldiers of the Shabana were staying, failed to surrender to the rebels. After hours of confrontation between the two sides, the rebels managed to take control of the Governmental Sarai (Qushla). In the evening, five Britons serving in the Sarai were killed in the battle. After controlling the town, the rebels cut off the railway running through the town. In Shahraban, after the rebels managed to control the town, there was a big conflict between the town elders and the Bani Tamim clan, which resulted in battles between them. On 7 September, the British troops, led by General Kongham, arrived near the town. After an unequal battle between the clans and the British troops, the latter managed to enter the town on 9 September.

==== Khanaqin and Qazelarbat ====
On 14 August, the Dalw clan, under the leadership of its leader Khesro Bek, attacked the city of Khanaqin. The city was occupied with little resistance. The rebels and those with them looted Dar al-Saray and all the governmental departments in the city. They took down the British flag and took up the Ottoman flag. The rebels appointed Khurshid Bek as the ruler of the city. The clans of Qazarbat also attacked the British, occupied the town and looted its building of the governmental Sarai. On the morning of 16 August, the Khanaqin revolutionists, led by Karim Khurshid Bek, attacked the Bawa Mahmoud camp, where the British army was holed up after the arrival of the reinforcements. A battle ensued between the two teams, ending with the defeat of the rebels, leaving 15 dead. On 19 August, a British force led by Colonel Kaskel arrived in the vicinity of Khanaqin without any resistance. The latter, along with his forces, punished the villages that joined the revolution. The next day, the colonel succeeded in conquering Khanaqin. On the evening of 24 August, the siege was lifted from the garrison of Qargan, where British soldiers were holed up, and the governor of Qarlzabat Ahmed Dara had taken refuge there. On 27 August, the British forces took control of the town of Qazelerbat.

==== Revolution in Kafri ====
On 22 August, Ibrahim Khan, one of the leaders of the Dalw clan, went with his companions to ascend to the top of Jabal Baba Shah Sawar, overlooking the city of Kafri, and opened fire on the governmental Sarai in the town. The assistant of the town's ruler, Captain Salmon, went himself to the mountain to negotiate with Ibrahim Khan, and as soon as the former arrived at the mountain, he was surprised by the rebels arresting him. The rebels attacked the town and occupied the governmental Sarai and took down the British flag. As soon as the news of the occupation of the town by the rebels reached Kirkuk's ruler, Major Lunkerk, he moved with his army towards the town. After a bloody battle, the British forces conquered the town.

==== Souq al-Sheioukh ====
On 27 August, the governor of Nasiriyah, Mager Dijbren, who was a former political governor in 1918, visited the town of Suq al-Sheioukh. Where he met with the chiefs of the town and tried to convince them not to join the revolution. As soon as Magoger Digber has returned to the city of Nasiriyah, he wrote a report to the British governor in Baghdad, Arnold Wilson. The assistant of the political ruler of the town, Captain Platts and his British companions, managed to escape from the town on 1 September by a British steamer anchored there and the ship steered them safely towards Nasiriyah. There was no looting for the town of Souq al-Sheioukh, as the rest of the towns of lewaa Muntafiq suffered from looting and destruction of the governmental Sarai. Sheioukh Muhammad Hassan al-Haidar managed to preserve all these properties. On 4 September, two military ships left Nasiriyah and the two ships arrived at the Hawar, located south of Souq al-Sheioukh. Both were heavily armed by the rebels and a battle between the two sides lasted for approximately half an hour.

=== Tal Afar ===
The British had an Assistant Political Officer, Major J. E. Barlow, stationed in Tal Afar.

== Aftermath ==
The war ended with a costly and military victory for the British. 2,050 to 10,000 Iraqis and around 1,000 British and Indian soldiers died during the revolt. The RAF flew missions totaling 4,008 hours, dropped 97 tons of bombs and fired 183,861 rounds for the loss of nine men killed, seven wounded and 11 aircraft destroyed behind rebel lines. The revolt caused British officials to drastically reconsider their strategy in Iraq. The revolt cost the British government 40 million pounds, which was twice the amount of the annual budget allotted for Iraq and a huge factor in reconsidering their strategy in Iraq. It had cost more than the entire British-funded Arab rising against the Ottoman Empire in 1917–1918.

The new Colonial Secretary, Winston Churchill, decided a new administration was needed in Iraq as well as the British colonies in the Middle East, so he called a large conference in Cairo. In March 1921 at the Cairo Conference, British officials discussed the future of Iraq. The British now wanted to control Iraq through more indirect means, mainly by installing former officials friendly to the British government. They eventually decided to install Faisal I bin Al-Hussein bin Ali Al-Hashemi as King of Iraq, as part of what was informally called the Sharifian Solution. Faysal had worked with the British before in the Arab Revolt during World War I and he enjoyed good relations with certain important officials. British officials also thought installing Faysal as king would prevent Faysal from fighting the French in Syria and damaging British-French relations.

For Iraqis, the revolt served as part of the founding of Iraqi nationalism although this conclusion is debated by scholars. It also showed unprecedented co-operation between Shia and Sunni Muslims, although this co-operation did not last much longer than the end of the revolt.

== See also ==
- RAF Iraq Command
- List of modern conflicts in the Middle East
- San Remo conference
- Al-Mas' Ala Al-Kubra
