= Al-Rumaitha =

Al-Rumaitha الرميثة
- City
- Location within Iraq
- Coordinates: 31.5209300°N 45.2016870°E
- Country: Iraq
- Governorates: Al Muthanna Governorate
- Established: 1820
- Elevation: 9 m (30 ft)

Population (2014)
  - Total: 115,431
- Time zone: UTC+3 (AST)

Al-Rumaitha (Arabic: الرميثة) is a city in Muthanna Governorate, Iraq. It is the capital of Al-Rumaitha District. Its population in 2014 was 115,431. The economy is predominantly agricultural, specializing in the production of date palms and grains.

== Name ==
Al-Rumaitha is named after the saxaul plant, ramth or rimth (رمث) in Arabic. It has had other names in the past. It was called al-‘Auja (العوجة, 'crooked') due to the way the river distorts the shape of the city, and al-Abyad (الاأبيض, 'white') due to the supposed presence of the white lion in its environs.

== Geography ==
Rumaitha is located beside one of the branches of the Euphrates River. It is approximately 25 kilometers north of Samawah, and several roads link the two cities.

== History ==
The city contains 35 archaeological sites, pertaining to different time periods from the Babylonian to the Islamic eras.

During the British occupation of Iraq, the British used al-Rumaitha, at that time a small village, as a military camp to support the supply and transportation of British forces moving from Basra and Nasiriya to Baghdad. In 1920, the Iraqi revolt against the British began in al-Rumaitha on 30 June, after the British arrested Sheikh Shaalan Abu al-Jun of the al-Dhuwalim tribe. Members of his tribe mounted a raid on the government holding facility and freed him. The city also supported the anti-British 1941 Iraqi coup d'état and participated in the anti-British Al-Wathbah uprising of 1948.

King Faisal I visited the city in 1922, as did Ghazi in 1937 and Faisal II in 1948, accompanied by 'Abd al-Ilah and Nuri al-Said.

In September 2006, Al-Rumaitha of the site of the eponymous battle between Australian forces and Iraqi insurgents.

== Infrastructure and Modern Projects ==
Between 2023 and 2026, the city of Rumaytha witnessed a package of service projects to improve its infrastructure. Among the most prominent was the completion of the major Rumaytha sewage project in late 2023, managed by the Ministry of Planning, serving approximately 100,000 residents in the neighborhoods of Al-Askari, Al-Shuhada, Al-Muhandiseen, Al-Mu'allemin, and others. This project included sewage pumping and treatment stations. Furthermore, in late 2024, service and engineering efforts were undertaken to rehabilitate previously underserved areas such as Khalaf Al-Mal'ab, Al-Tabar, and Al-Basatin Al-Sharqiya. These efforts included paving roads and extending water and sewage networks to serve approximately 40,000 citizens. In the same vein, the local government in Al-Muthanna awarded additional service projects worth over 13 billion Iraqi dinars to develop the district's roads and services. Work also continued on the Rumaytha residential complex, implemented by the Ministry of Construction and Housing to address the housing crisis.
