= Bani Malik (tribe) =

Arab Tribe

Banu Malik بني مالك
- Qahtanite Arab tribe
- Ethnicity: Arab
- Nisba: al-Maliki
- Location: Iraq
- Parent tribe: Madhhij
- Branches: Al Ali
- Language: Arabic
- Religion: Islam

Bani Malik (Arabic: بني مالك) or Banu Malik (Arabic: بنو مالك) (English: The Sons of Malik) is one of the major Arab tribes of the Arabian Peninsula. They are descendants of Malik al-Ashtar al-Nakh'ei who fought with Ali ibn Abi Talib, the cousin of the Islamic prophet Muhammad.

A hyphenated Al (Al-) means "The" if it is prefixed to the tribe name but means "The son of..." if prefixed to a person's name, while the plain Al (آل) and Bani (بني) or Albu (ألبو) or Banu (بنو) mean the plural "The sons of..". Their great ancestor is Qahtan (قحطان) from South Arabia. Bani Malik are named after Malik al-Ashtar from Nakh'a tribe, an offshoot of a larger tribe called Madhhij. After they became Muslim, Al-Nakh'a continued their ancestry with their cousins, the tribe of Azd (Madhhij's brother), who lived in Makkah called Khuza'a (خزاعة) named after Khuza’a (also named Haritha) Ibn Amr Ibn Muzaqiba of Al-Azd the major Qahtani tribe. Khuza'a tribe fought with Muhammad against the pagans and infidels Banu Bakr who tried to conquer Mecca. This incident has been mentioned and blessed in a verse in the Quran (Verse At-Tawba-14). Sulaiman bin Kuthayer who is one of the Abbasid supporters descended from Bani Malik. He was later killed by Abu-Muslim al-Khurasani a dissident Persian outlaw. Bani Malik lived in Ahwaz, Qatif, Bahrain and in Iraq. In Iraq, they now live in Basrah, Nasiriyah and on the eastern bank of Euphrates River at Al Diwaniyah in central Iraq. The territory of their major offshoot –the Al Ali tribe– extends from al-Diwanylah in the north to al-Rumaitha to the south. The area was named after their name, Al-Ali. The rivers – al-Rafi, al-Yusufyia and al-Lawah – irrigated the area. In 1900 when these rivers dried up they moved to an area around al-Hindyiah branch of Euphrates River, which was dug by Asif al-Dawla al-Hindi in 1845 (1205 AH).

== Tribes ==
- Al-Ali tribe (Iraq)
- Al-Faraj
- Al-Ismail
- Al-Awabid
- Al-Humaidat
- Al-Ibrahim
- Bani Rzaij
