= Hillah =

Capital of Babylon Province, Iraq

Hillah ٱلْحِلَّة
- City
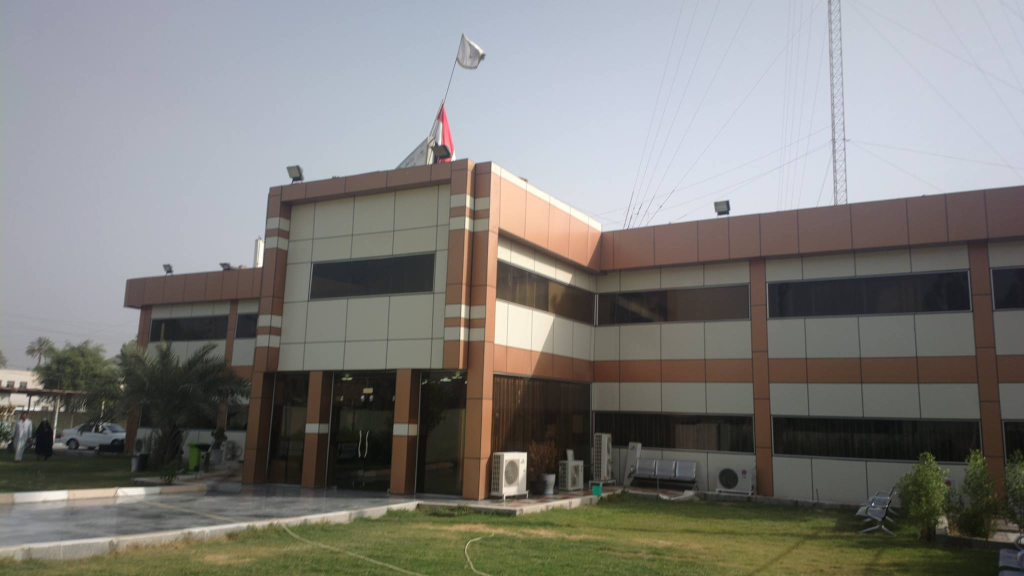
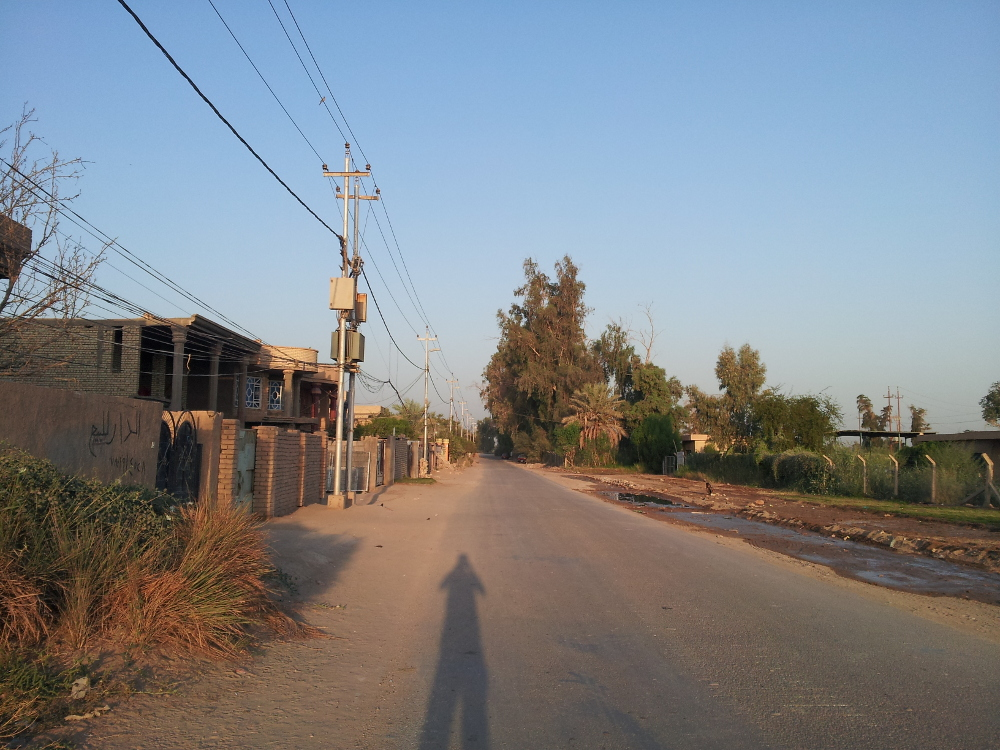
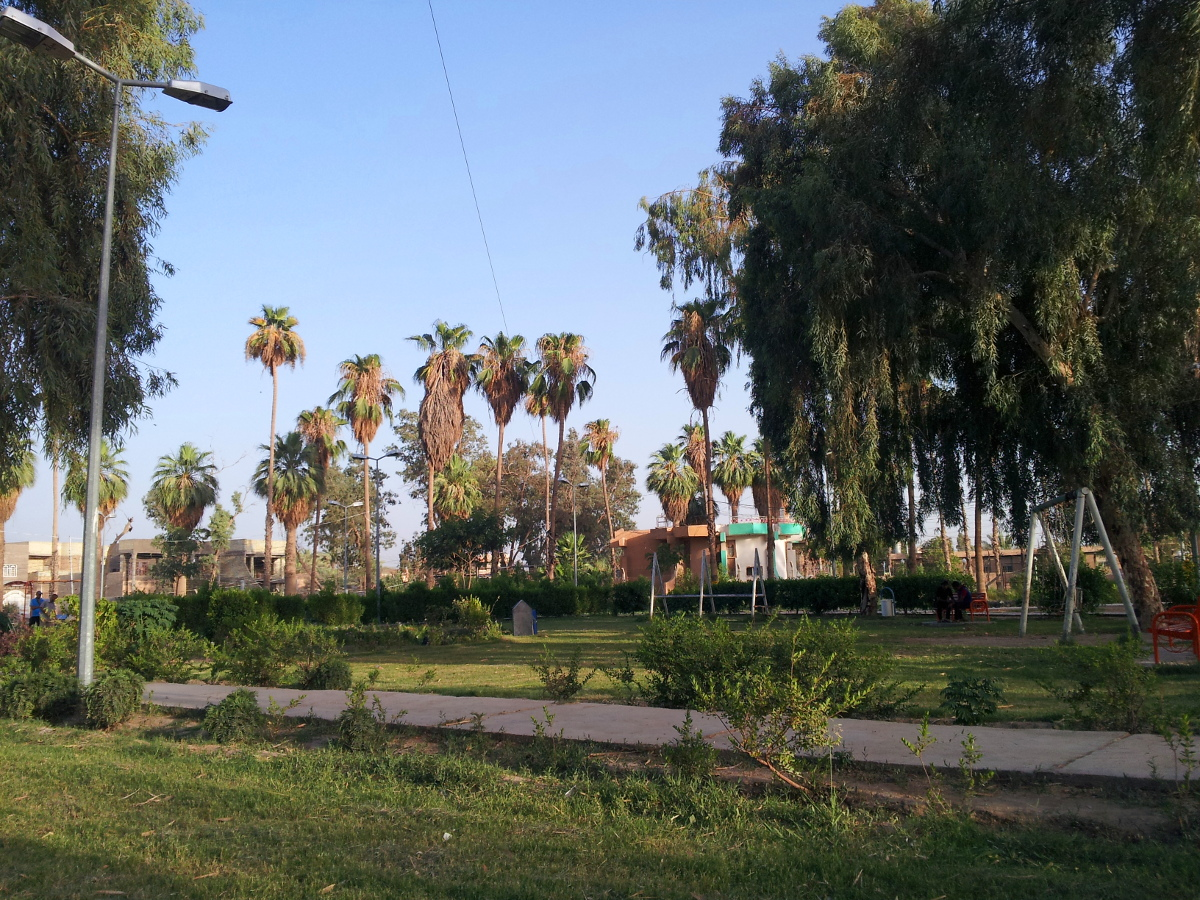
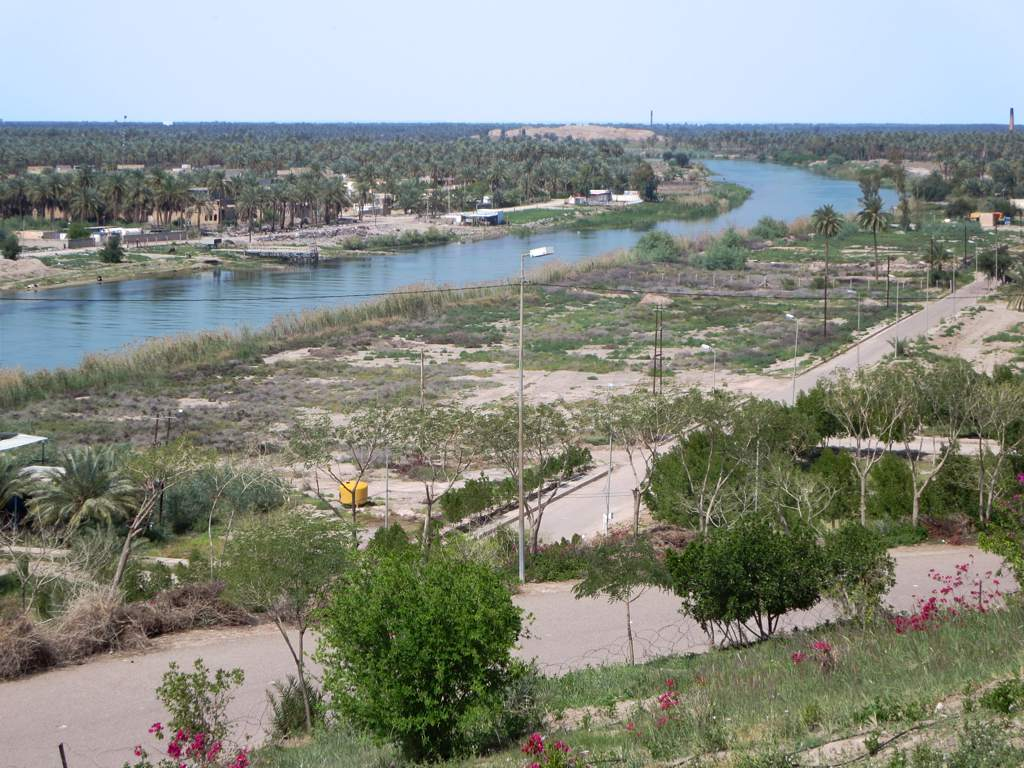
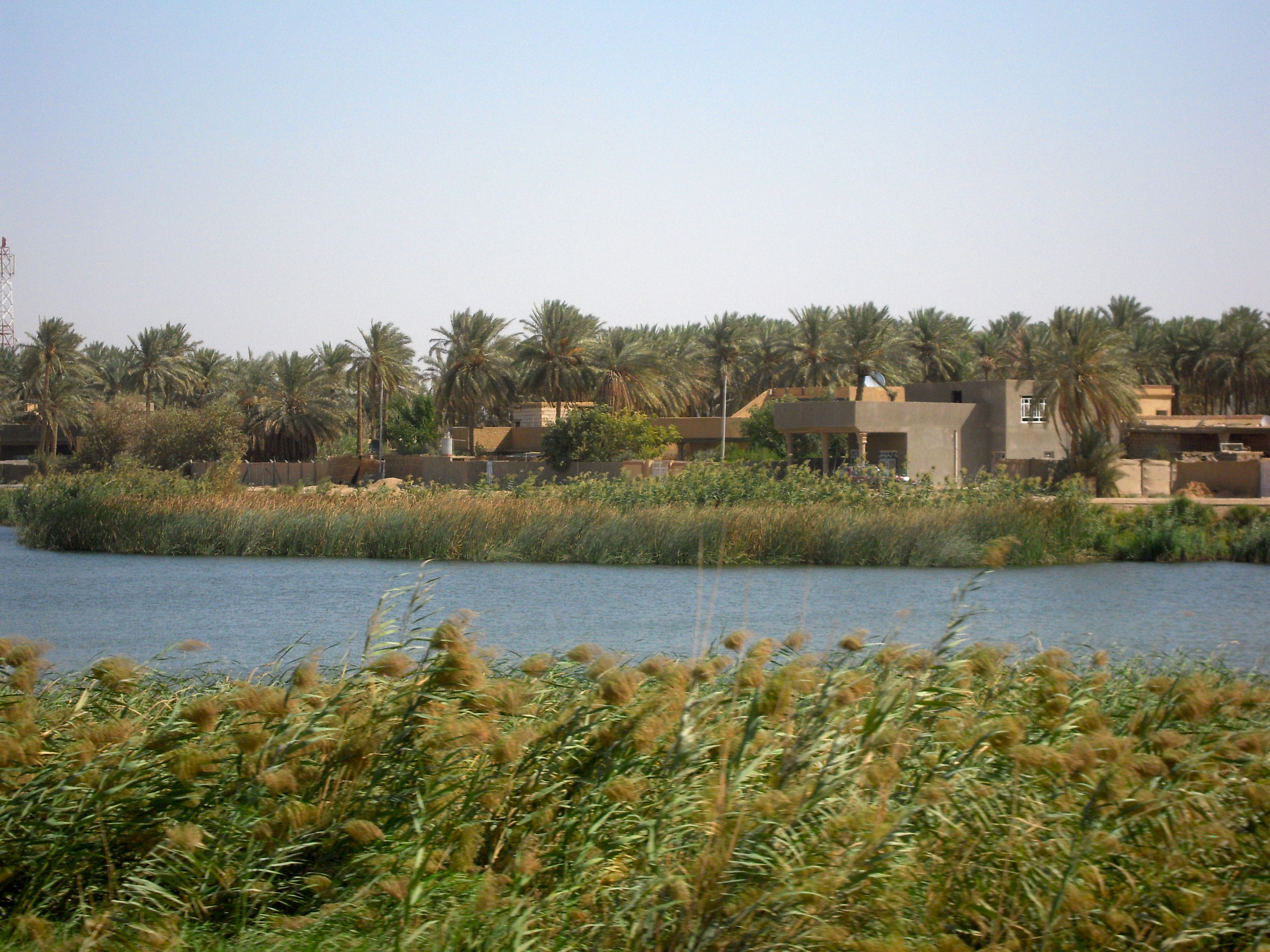
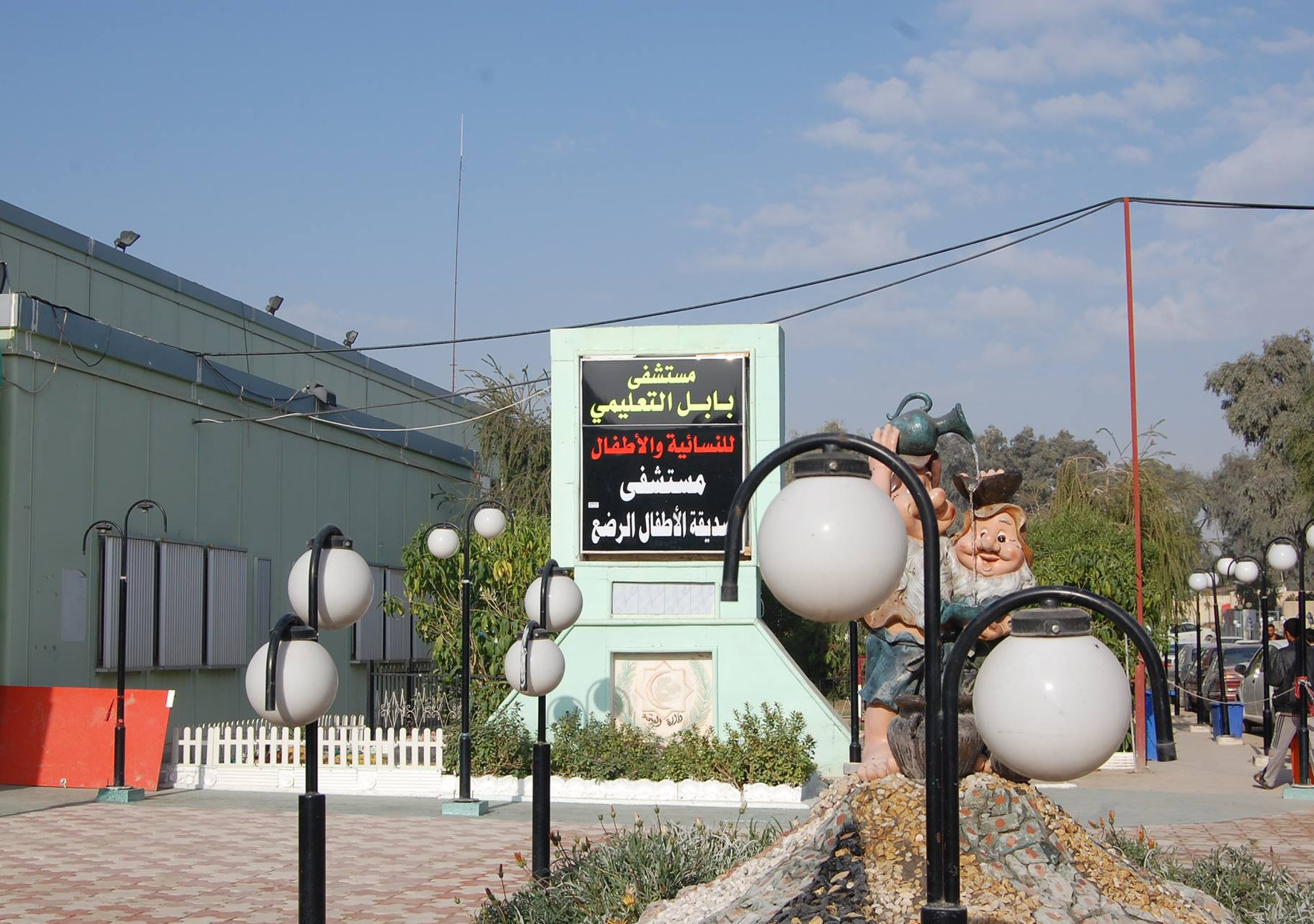
- Left to right, top to bottom: Al Noor Hospital • Suburban Jebalah • Jebalah Park • Hillah River • River-front Homes • Babil Teaching Hospital

- Location within Iraq
- Coordinates: 32°28′39″N 44°25′53″E
- Country: Iraq
- Province: Babylon
- Elevation: 112 ft (34 m)

Population
  - Estimate (2018): 455,741

Hillah (Arabic: ٱلْحِلَّة al-Ḥillah), also spelled Hilla, is a city in central Iraq. On the Hilla branch of the Euphrates River, it is 100 km (62 mi) south of Baghdad. The population was estimated to be about 455,700 in 2018. It is the capital of Babylon Province and is situated in a predominantly agricultural region which is extensively irrigated with water provided by the Hilla canal, producing a wide range of crops, fruit and textiles. Its name may be derived from the word "beauty" in Arabic. The river runs in the middle of the town, and it is surrounded by date palm trees and other forms of arid vegetation, reducing the harmful effects of dust and desert wind.

The city is located adjacent to the ancient city of Babylon, and close to the ancient cities of Borsippa and Kish. It was once a major centre of Islamic scholarship and education. The tomb of the Abrahamic prophet Ezekiel is reputed to be located in a nearby village, Al Kifl. It became a major administrative centre in Ottoman Iraq, and later Mandatory Iraq. In the 19th century, the Hilla branch of the Euphrates started to silt up and much agricultural land was lost to drought, but this process was reversed by the construction of the Hindiya Barrage in 1911–1913, which diverted water from the deeper Hindiya branch of the Euphrates into the Hilla canal. It saw heavy fighting in 1920 during an uprising against the British, when 300 men of the Manchester Regiment were defeated in the city.

== History ==
=== Early history ===
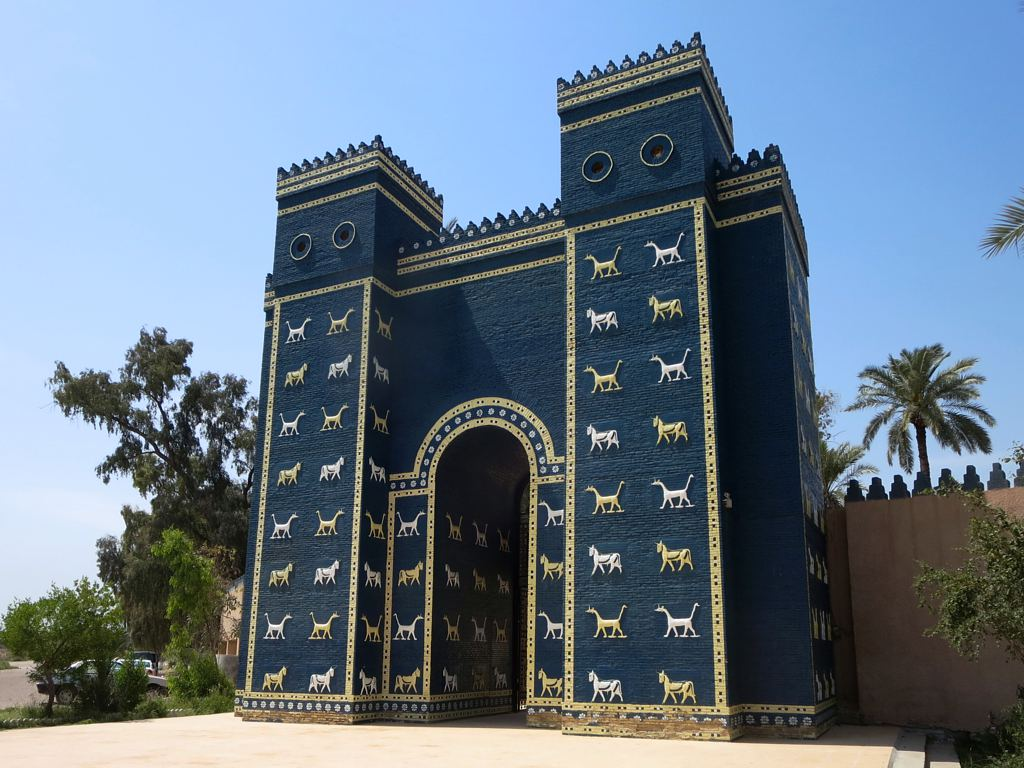
Replica Ishtar Gate in Hillah

Hillah is located near the ruins of ancient Babylon. It is likely that Babylon was founded in the third millennium BC and rose to prominence over the next thousand years. By the 18th century BC the city was the centre of the empire of Hammurabi. Various empires controlled Babylon over the following centuries. Babylon briefly regained independence during the Neo-Babylonian empire towards the end of the 7th century BC, most notably under the reign of king Nebuchadnezzar II, but came under Persian occupation in the 6th century BC.

The name "Babylon" translates to "Gate of the God". Following the fall of the Sumerians, Babylon emerged as the center of the Babylonian Empire, established by King Hammurabi around 2100 BCE. The empire spanned from the Persian Gulf in the south to the Tigris River in the north. Hammurabi's rule lasted 43 years, during which the Babylonian civilization flourished, marking his reign as a golden age. Among Babylon's wonders were the Hanging Gardens, considered one of the Seven Wonders of the Ancient World, constructed by the Chaldean king Nebuchadnezzar II.

The city featured eight gates, with the grandest being the massive Ishtar Gate, and housed the Temple of Marduk within its walls, located in the great religious festival area outside the city. Ancient sources refer to Babylon by various names, including "Babylonia," meaning the land of Babylon, as well as "Mesopotamia" and "the land of the two rivers."

The ruins of Babylon have suffered greatly due to looting and destructive policies. Parts of Nebuchadnezzar's palace and some of the old city walls still remain. Saddam Hussein commissioned a restoration of ancient Babylon on part of the site. A modern palace was restored on Nebuchadnezzar ancient palace. A reconstruction of the Ishtar Gate is displayed in the Pergamon Museum in Berlin.

=== Origin and foundation of Hillah ===
In the 10th century, the town of Al Jami'ayn was founded on the eastern bank of the Euphrates. The location of that town is in modern-day Hillah now. In 1101 AD a new town was founded near Al Jami'ayn. Bricks were taken from Babylon to build houses and so Hillah expanded. During the 18th century, the town became an administrative centre in the Ottoman Empire. In the 19th century, the flow in the al-Hillah stream decreased, and that led to worsening conditions for agriculture, which affected them greatly. To solve the problem, al-Hindiya Barrage was built.

According to some researchers, based on eyewitness accounts, the area where Hillah was established was not devoid of military and civilian construction for habitation. Instead, it was previously home to a city known as Al-Jamain. An eyewitness, who died about a century and a half before the founding of Hillah by Sadqa, described it as a small platform surrounded by a very fertile settlement. This description aligns with information from Ibn Hawqal, who lived in the 4th century AH (10th century CE), noting that the land of Al-Jamain stretched along both banks of the Hillah River. This area included the site of the ancient city of Nile, which was settled by the Banu Mazid tribe around 405 AH (1014 CE).

At that time, the land where the city of Nile was located was a large, populated village along the river, which had been excavated by Al-Hajjaj ibn Yusuf. In contrast, Al-Jamain was a thriving city during the 4th century AH, with notable leaders such as Ali ibn Dawood al-Tanukhi serving as judges. Throughout its history, Al-Jamain faced invasions, including attacks by the Qaramita in the 4th century AH and repeated raids by the Khafaja tribes in the early part of the 5th century AH. Historical texts confirm that Al-Jamain had a significant urban, economic, and social presence long before the establishment of Hillah.

Hillah was founded by Sayf al-Dawla Sadqa ibn Mansur in 495 AH (1101 CE) on the western bank of the Hillah River, having relocated from the city of Nile, which had been the residence of the Banu Mazid family since 405 AH (1014 CE). However, prior to Sadqa's establishment of Hillah, the site had already been home to the city of Al-Jamain.

From the historical texts and information presented, it can be inferred that the site of Hillah on the right bank of the Hillah River witnessed the emergence of two adjacent cities, each differing in their founding dates and founders. One was Al-Jamain, whose founder remains unknown but is believed to have been established in the first half of the 1st century AH. The other was the city founded by Prince Sayf al-Dawla Sadqa in 495 AH, known as Hillah al-Sayfiyah, which became a significant center in its own right, encompassing a vast area of what is now Iraq, dominated politically and militarily by foreign elements at the time.

=== Caliphate and Ottoman rule ===
Following the fall of the Abbasid Caliphate and the Mongol invasion of Baghdad, the Mongols prepared to conquer other regions of Iraq. However, Hillah managed to avoid the devastation inflicted by the Mongols due to the wisdom of its scholars. They understood the catastrophic consequences that the Mongol forces would bring upon any city they entered, including destruction, pillaging, and violations of local laws.

In response, the prominent scholars of Hillah convened, including Sheikh Yusuf ibn Ali ibn Muthahir al-Hilli (father of the renowned scholar Al-Hilli), Sayyid Majd al-Din ibn Tawus, and Ibn Abi al-Ghar al-Hilli. They agreed to send a letter to Hulagu Khan, expressing their willingness to submit to his authority. This strategic decision preserved their city and the two holy shrines. Subsequently, Sayyid Majd al-Din Muhammad ibn Tawus authored a book titled Al-Bashara, which he presented to Hulagu. This action led Hulagu to restore local governance in the Euphrates region to Sayyid ibn Tawus and to ensure the safety of the two revered shrines and Hillah itself. As a result, Hillah continued to serve as a center of cultural and religious vitality, safeguarding treasures of Islamic knowledge and literary heritage without the upheaval experienced by other cities in Iraq. After Baghdad fell, the Jalairid state chose Hillah as its capital around 812 AH (1410 CE) during the reign of the Qarakarunlu dynasty.

During the Ottoman period, Hillah became a district (qaimmaqam) within the Diwaniya province, eventually being elevated to a mutasarrifate. Under the governance of the Ottoman official Yusuf Bey, the city underwent significant development, including the construction of public facilities, such as the Great Hillah Mosque, built in 1125 AH (1713 CE) in the Al-Jabran neighborhood, a notable historical landmark.

One of the most significant events in Hillah during the late Ottoman period, particularly during World War I, was the “Dakka Akif” uprising. Hillah raised the banner of rebellion against the oppressive Ottoman authority, leading to two assaults by the Turkish commander Akif Bey. His first campaign did not yield significant success; however, he returned with a larger force and more advanced weaponry in 1916 from his camp at Al-Kifl. During this second assault, he bombarded the city, resulting in the destruction of three neighborhoods: Al-Taq, Al-Jamain, and Al-Wardiya. The campaign led to the execution of 126 men from Hillah, while many women were captured and taken as slaves to Anatolia, forcing the remaining residents to flee.

=== Modern Iraq ===
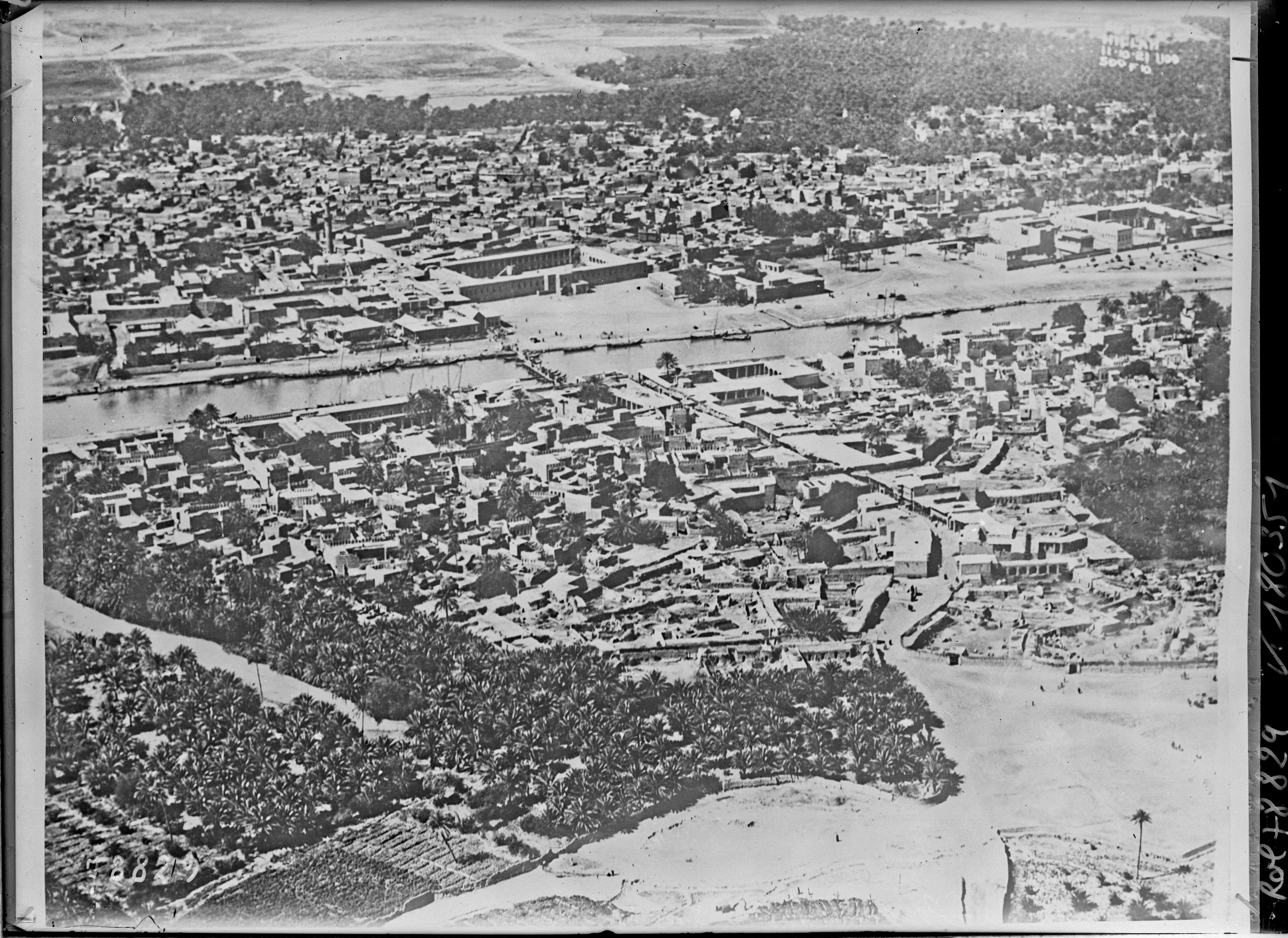
Aerial shot of Hillah in 1922

The British occupied the city of Hillah on March 9, 1917 (15 Jumada al-Awwal, 1335 AH). Three years later, the famous 1920 Revolution erupted, in which prominent scholars and notables from Hillah played significant roles. After the 1920 Revolution, the literary sentiment evolved into a national political feeling against the British, leading to the establishment of various cultural and political associations. Hillah's writers and intellectuals engaged in manuscript writing, as there were no opportunities for publishing or creating periodicals at that time. The events of the 1920 Revolution began on June 30, 1920, during a peak of conflict regarding governance with British occupying forces, who had abandoned their promises to the Iraqi people. Hillah was not isolated from the political climate in Iraq that preceded the uprising; the atmosphere was marked by widespread public rejection of the secretive referendum on the nature of governance held on November 30, 1918.

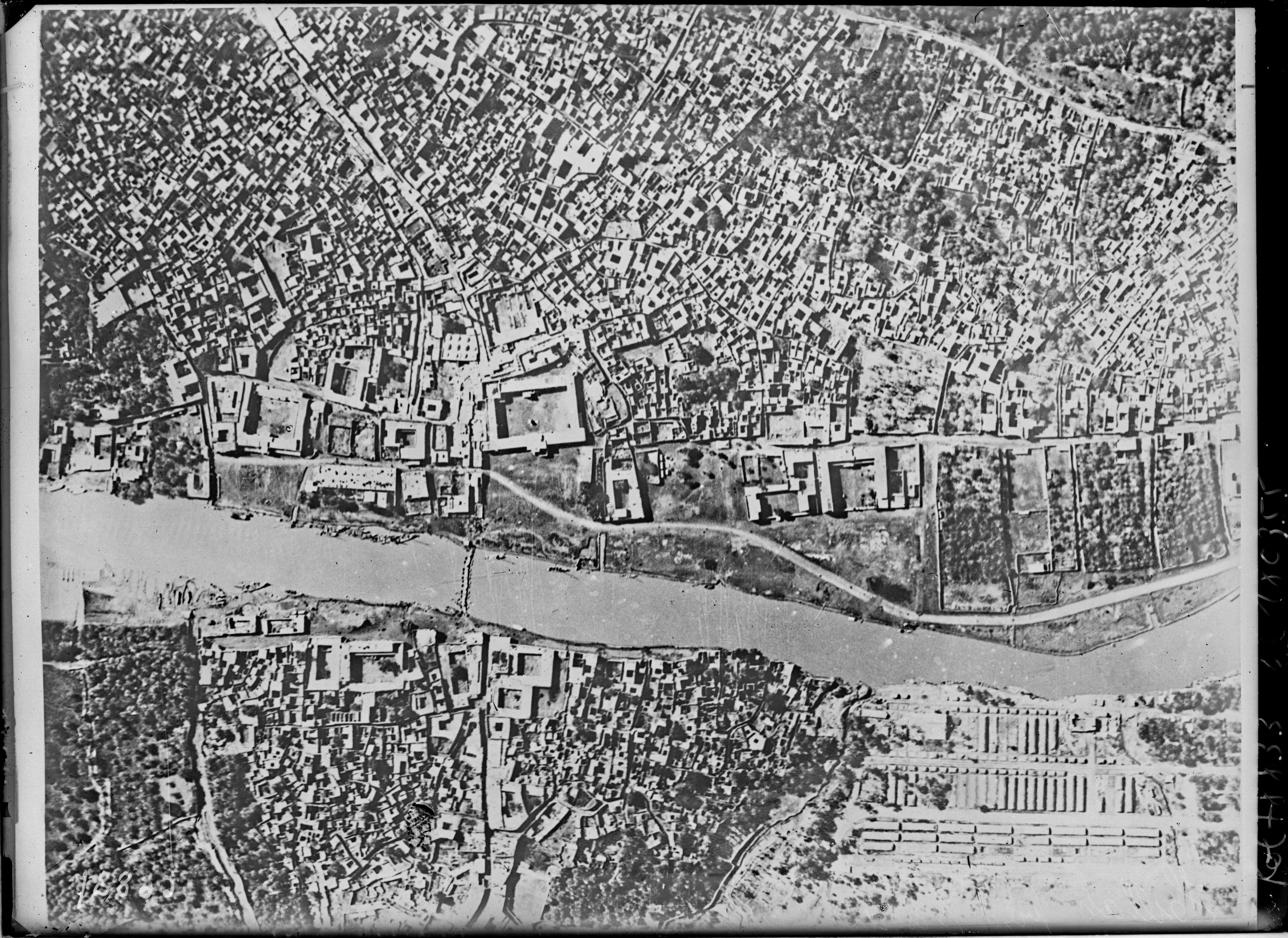
Bird’s-eye view of Hillah in 1922

Hillah was among the few Iraqi cities to establish a branch of the Independence Guard Association shortly after its founding in Baghdad in late February 1919. It included prominent local figures in political activism, such as the poet Muhammad Mahdi al-Basir, who was appointed to lead the branch, along with Ra'uf al-Amin and Muhammad Baqir al-Hilli. A representative from Hillah attended a meeting in Baghdad with leaders of the movement on May 23, 1920, which served to prepare and gauge the sentiments of the Euphrates region regarding the impending revolution. The impact of these activities and the prevailing national sentiment among Hillah's residents became clear during a large national meeting held at the Great Mosque (in Hillah's market) just days before the revolution, on June 19, 1920, which was the second day of Eid al-Fitr. Sheikh Muhammad al-Shuhayb read a letter from religious authority Shirazi urging Iraqis to demand their legitimate rights peacefully. Following his reading, Ra'uf al-Amin and Sayyid Abdul Salam al-Hafiz addressed the crowd, delivering passionate speeches calling for Iraq's independence and proclaiming Prince Abdullah as its king.

The British response to this public gathering was swift, resulting in the arrest of Ra'uf al-Amin, Sayyid Abdul Salam al-Hafiz, Sayyid Ahmad al-Salim al-Tawut, Baqir al-Ali al-Khafaji, Jabbar Ali al-Hassani, Ali al-Hammadi, and Khairi al-Hindawi. They were transported by train to Basra and subsequently exiled to Hengam Island in the Persian Gulf, where they remained for five months; during this time, Sayyid Ahmad al-Salim al-Tawut passed away. In her memoirs, Miss Bell noted that the exiling of these individuals helped ease tensions in Hillah. It is noteworthy that prior to the outbreak of the 1920 Revolution, the British made Hillah a military center, reinforcing it with additional troops. Following a series of victories by the revolutionaries, most British forces stationed in the Euphrates region withdrew to Hillah, which became the last British stronghold in central Euphrates by August 1920.

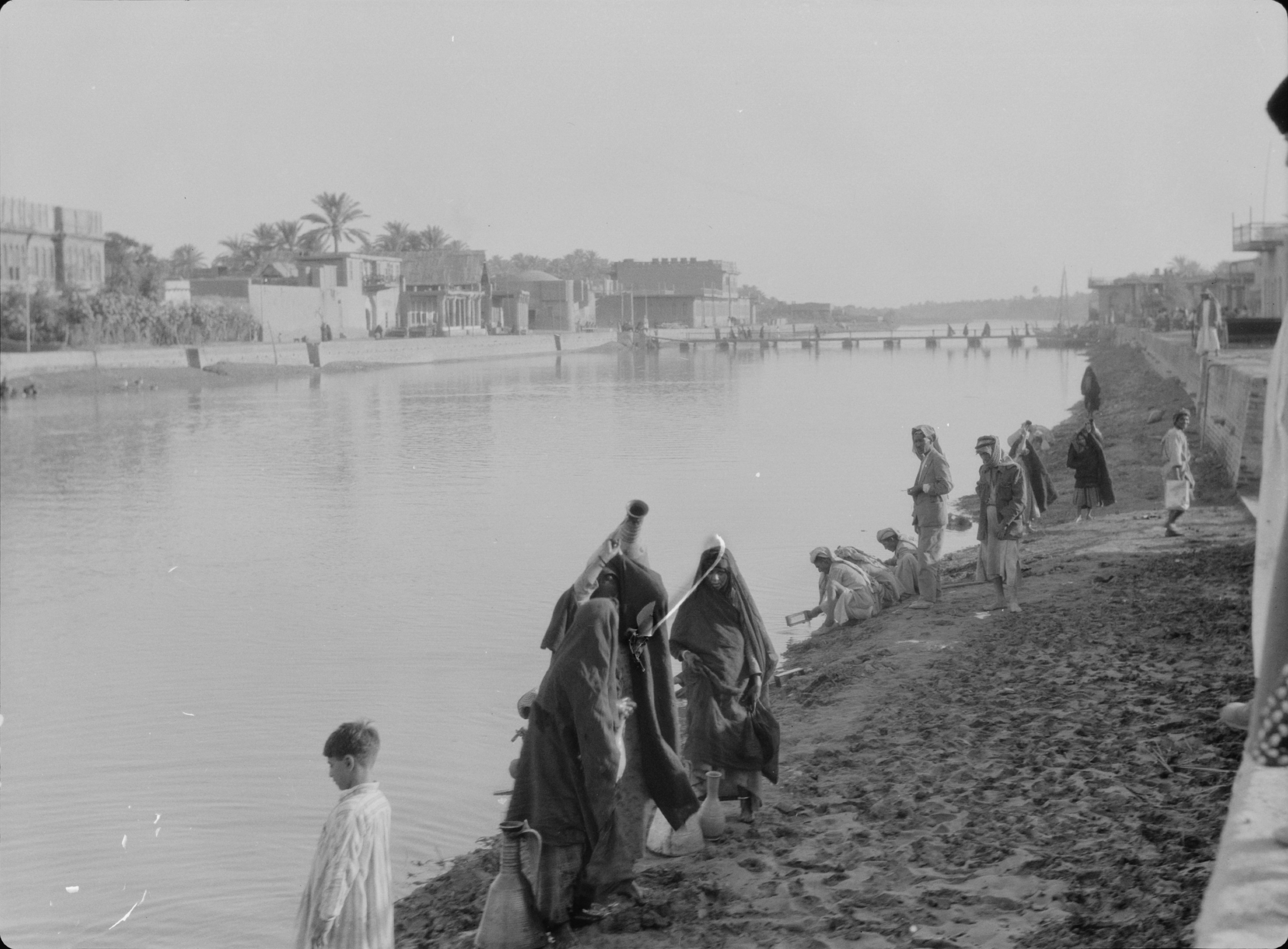
Locals on the banks of the Hillah River, 1932

Sheikh Abdul Karim al-Mashita and several family members were arrested amid the events of the revolution, facing accusations of inciting rebellion and firing at a British aircraft. They were detained until the intervention of Hajj Abdul Razzaq al-Sharif, a local dignitary and mayor of Hillah, secured their release. It was said that they faced the death penalty were it not for this intervention. Following the revolutionaries' victory at the Battle of Raranjah on July 24, which exemplified bravery and sacrifice, they launched an assault on Hillah at the end of July. However, this effort was ultimately unsuccessful due to various factors, including British superiority in numbers, equipment, and fortifications, as well as the reluctance of some tribal leaders to support the revolutionaries. One of the revolution's leaders, Sayyid Muhammad Ali Kamal al-Din, expressed regret in his memoirs about the failure to achieve their goals, lamenting that the revolution's direction had shifted, and the Euphrates was almost entirely under the control of British forces, as they sought to quash the uprising and dominate the rural areas of Hillah and central Euphrates. The last communiqué issued by the British High Commissioner in Iraq on November 26, 1920, announced the end of hostilities with the Shami tribes.

Following the conclusion of the Gulf War in 1991 and the withdrawal of the Iraqi army, the Popular Uprising erupted in the southern regions of Iraq, reaching the city of Hillah. The uprising began on March 3, when the insurgent forces managed to seize control of Hillah and expel members of the Ba'ath Party from the city. However, this control was short-lived, as the Republican Guard, supported by army units, launched a significant counter-offensive against Hillah. Utilizing air strikes and tank assaults, they ultimately regained full control of the city and quashed the rebellion.

=== 2003 US invasion ===
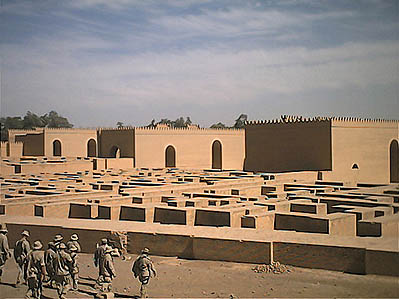
U.S. Marines in Babylon ruins

Hillah was the scene of relatively heavy fighting in the 2003 invasion of Iraq on and around April 1, 2003. Iraqi casualties from the Medina Division of the Republican Guard were unknown but casualties reached in the several hundreds for the United States Army's 2-70th Armor. Following the invasion, 1st Battalion 4th Marines had its headquarters at the abandoned Tariq Pistol Factory for 6 months in 2003.

In April 2003, following the fall of Baghdad to U.S. Forces, the Headquarters for the 1st Marine Expeditionary Force (1st MEF) commanded by Lieutenant General James T. Conway, USMC established its command center on the adjacent grounds to Saddam Hussein’s palace in Babylon. From here General Conway coordinated all Marine Corps operations in southern Iraq. The 1st MEF was colocated adjacent to the ancient site of Babylon that included the ruins of Nebuchadnezzar’s palaces, the museum staff, the foundation for the Tower of Babylon, Marduk’s temple and a coliseum constructed by Alexander the Great.

In the first week of their encampment General Conway dispatched the Deputy MEF Chaplain, CDR Emilio Marrero, to establish contact with the staff at the Babylonian ruins site. The staff conveyed a need for assistance and requested protection against looters. General Conway approved a plan, derived by his Chief of Staff Colonel John C. Coleman, to incorporate the ancient site into the encampments perimeter in order to protect the ancient site and to support the local curators and archaeological staff. This included making Chaplain Marrero the official point of contact for all matters thus earning him the moniker, “Mayor of Babylon” amongst the staff.

Chaplain Marrero authored a personal memoir of his experiences in Babylon, “A Quiet Reality: A Chaplains Journey with the 1st Marine Expeditionary Force in Iraq.” His book was later used for an opinion piece by Melli Kaylan in the Wall Street Journal to counter charges that the Marines contributed to the destruction of ancient Babylon (https://www.wsj.com/articles/SB10001424052748704013004574519354014954972) NMCB 15 was assigned duties by 1st MEF to secure and repair some of the buildings until private contracts were initiated to begin renovating the damage done by looters.

Shortly after the invasion a mass grave site was reported by locals to be in the area around Hillah. Local citizens and members of ORHA, and NMCB-15 (Naval Mobile Construction Battalion) worked together to exhume thousands of Iraqis who had been killed by Iraq's security forces during the uprising against the government in 1991. The 1st Marine Division had established a base at one of Saddam Hussein's palaces about one mile north of Hillah. The 372nd Military Police Company had performed law and order and Iraqi Police training in the city from June 2003 to October 2003 prior to moving on to Abu Ghraib prison. The city was part of the Polish military zone after the US Marines left in August 2003 and turned control over to the Iraq MultiNational Force during the occupation of Iraq

After the initial invasion, Hilla was relatively peaceful, but it then became the scene of numerous bomb attacks. In February, 2004, insurgents tried but failed to blow up a camp run by Hungarian troops with truck bombs. February 28, 2005 saw the deadliest single insurgent attack up till then, when a car bomb killed 125 people outside a medical clinic. On May 30, 2005, two suicide bombers killed 31, and wounded 108, Shia police. On September 30, 2005, a car bomb exploded in a vegetable market in Hilla, killing 10 and wounding 30 others. On January 2, 2007, at least 73 people were killed and more than 160 were injured when two suicide bombers blew up themselves at a gathering of Shia militias. On February 1, 2007, a pair of suicide bombers detonated explosives among shoppers at a crowded outdoor market, killing at least 45 people and wounding approximately 150. On March 6, 2007, 114 people were killed and at least 147 people were wounded in two car bomb attacks targeting Shia pilgrims. On May 10, 2010, a series of three to four suicide car bombs at the 'State Company for Textile Industries' in the city killed a total of 45 people and left 140 wounded. On March 6, 2016, a truck bomb hit a military checkpoint in Hillah, killing at least 60 people and wounding more than 70. The Islamic State (IS) claimed responsibility for the bombing.

== Geography ==
=== Geology and natural resources ===
A detailed scientific study at the University of Babylon proved that Babil province is rich with natural untapped oil, gas and minerals of economic and industrial rocks and sediments of rivers and groundwater that can be exploited to intensify studies, geophysical surveys and mining.

=== Climate ===
Hillah has a hot desert climate (BWh) in the Köppen–Geiger climate classification system. Most rain falls in the winter. The average annual temperature in Hillah is 23.1 °C (73.6 °F). About 114 mm (4.49 in) of precipitation falls annually.

Climate data for Hillah
Month	Jan	Feb	Mar	Apr	May	Jun	Jul	Aug	Sep	Oct	Nov	Dec	Year
Mean daily maximum °C (°F)	16.4 (61.5)	19.3 (66.7)	23.8 (74.8)	29.4 (84.9)	35.8 (96.4)	41.3 (106.3)	43.6 (110.5)	43.4 (110.1)	40.1 (104.2)	33.6 (92.5)	24.9 (76.8)	18.2 (64.8)	30.8 (87.5)
Mean daily minimum °C (°F)	4.3 (39.7)	6.3 (43.3)	9.9 (49.8)	14.9 (58.8)	20.4 (68.7)	24.0 (75.2)	26.0 (78.8)	25.1 (77.2)	21.8 (71.2)	16.7 (62.1)	10.8 (51.4)	5.8 (42.4)	15.5 (59.9)
Average precipitation mm (inches)	25 (1.0)	17 (0.7)	14 (0.6)	16 (0.6)	5 (0.2)	0 (0)	0 (0)	0 (0)	0 (0)	2 (0.1)	12 (0.5)	23 (0.9)	114 (4.5)
Source: climate-data.org

== Health ==
Babil governorate has ten hospitals with 1,200 beds. At the beginning of 2005, the local health department announced some plans to build two hospitals with 50 beds each near Al-Khifil and Al-Shomaly. Major hospitals in Hillah, will also receive major renovations. Staff master plan is to raise the level of training of personnel in the field of nursing and re-construction of new health centers across the province.

Hillah contains four major government hospitals and they are: Hillah General Teaching Hospital, Babylon Hospital for Women and Children, Merjan Teaching Hospital, and Al Noor Hospital for Children.

Since 2008, Hillah has hosted an annual medical conference under the slogan "Babylon .. cultural capital of Iraq .. the future of medicine in scientific research". The conference offers a number of scientific presentations that address the medical health and education in the country and projects to support health and medical research in the future. There is also an exhibition of modern medical devices and electric vehicles for people with disabilities, in addition to medicines and treatments. The bast medical laboratory is called Al-Zahawi medical lab. and it is run by the well-known Dr. Anmar D. Ghazalah

== Culture ==
Hillah has a rich cultural history and is widely mentioned in history books, literature, geography, and biographies. The single most famous medieval Shia theologian, Allamah Jamāl ad-Dīn al-Hasan al-Hilli was a native of Hillah. It was chosen as the cultural capital of Iraq in 2008 because of its large cultural gatherings and art galleries, as well as the many talents in all fields of culture and art, particularly poetry, writing, music and vocals.

Many well known Iraqi writers have written about the city, including: Mr. Abdul-Razzaq al-Husseini, Abd al-Qadir al-Zahawi, Mohammad Mehdi Aljawahiri, Rusafi, Sahtia AlHasri, Dr. Fadel Aljamali, Thi Alnun Ayoub, Dr Ali Jawad Tahir, and Ahmad al-Safi al-Najafi.

Many writers, poets, and artists have also come from Hillah, including: Dheyaa Hamio, Saifuddin Al-Hilly, Mohammed Mahdi Albasir, Ali Jawad Tahir, archaeologists Ahmed Sosa, Taha Baqir, and Ahmed Saeed.

Other medieval scholars native to Hillah are Muhaqqiq al-Hilli and Ibn Tawus.

== Education ==
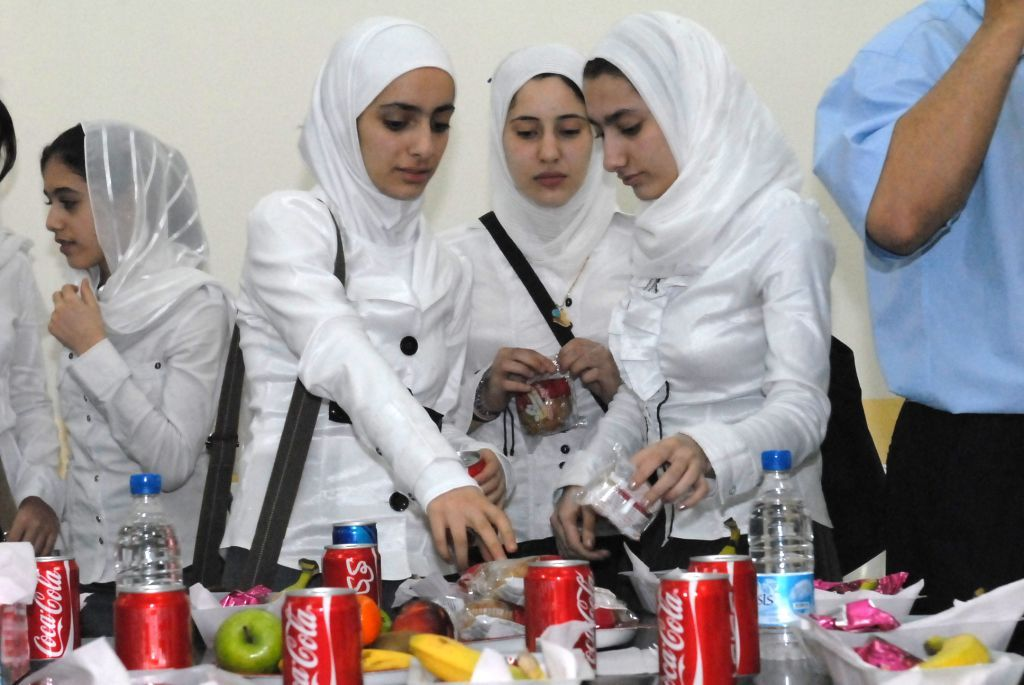
Students from Hillah during the occupation of Iraq

The Ottomans established modern schools, including the school Al-Rashidiya where material was taught in Turkish. The first elementary school in Hillah was Madrasat Al-Sharqia, which was founded in 1918 with one class and twenty students. It was located in the top floor of the Grand Mosque and the first director of it was Mr. Abdul Mahdi al-Hilali. Later the school moved to a building on the Shatt al-Hilla with four classes, but this school was not stable because the majority of students leave these schools to study at the seminary. The first secondary school in Hillah, established in 1927, was Al-Hillah Secondary School. Another school was Moderiat Alm'arif, founded in year 1931.

University education in Hillah started with the founding of the Institute of Management in 1976 and the foundation of the Department of Technology and Management Branch Stores. In 1980 it was called the Technical Institute; today it is called the Technical Institute in Babylon and includes the following fields: scientific (civil and space and electrical and electronic devices, computers and mechanics, machinery and equipment), administrative (accounting, management, and computer systems), and medical (community health and nursing). In 1959 the Technical Institute established a project Musayyib that included these disciplines: technological (Irrigation and mechanics, machinery and equipment), administrative (accounting, warehouse management), and agricultural (plant production, soil and land reclamation, machinery and agricultural equipment, and production of life).

Starting in 1991, the University of Babylon offers education in fine arts, law, engineering, science, education, medicine, management, economy, literature, agriculture, science for girls dentistry, veterinary medicine, and nursing. The university includes several scientific centers: Center for Studies Babylonian Center, documents and studies Hillah, electronic calculators, Teaching Methods Development Center, and Continuing Education Center. The province of Babylon contains five universities: Babylon University, Alqasim Green University (introduced in 2012 in Al-Qasim), Al-Nahrain University, Almostaqbal University College, and Hillah University College.

== Archaeological sites ==
=== Babylon ruins ===
Located just 5 km (3.1 mi) north of the city of Hillah, Babylon was a marveled city of the ancient world, especially under the rule of king Nebuchadnezzar (605–562 BC). It was the capital of the Neo-Babylonian Empire and its walls and hanging gardens were considered one of the seven wonders of the world.

=== Kish ruins (Tell Uhaimir) ===
Kish is located 13 km (8 mi) from city of Hillah and 6 km (3.7 mi) east of the ancient city of Babylon. The large site comprises several dozen ruin mounds, the largest being Tell Uhaimir (ancient Kish) and Tell Ingharra (ancient Hursagkalama). Both mounds feature the remains of a ziggurat, or temple tower, and associated temple complexes. The god Zababa was worshipped in Kish itself, and the goddess Inana or Ishtar in Hursagkalama. The site was first occupied in at least the fourth millennium BC, and the latest archaeological remains found there date to the late Abbasid period.

=== Alberes ===
Alberes is situated south of Hillah, approximately 24 km (14.9 mi) away. It has a tower found between Hillah and Al-Khifil. Its current name is a distortion of the name Old Babylonian "بورسيا" (which is now a newspaper) and its Sumerian meaning is "sword of the sea", because it was located on the Ghadeer edge along the banks of the Sea of Najaf.

== Notable people ==
- Najih al-Mamouri (born 1944), short story writer, novelist, and researcher

== See also ==
- List of places in Iraq
