= 1959 in Iraq =

- Decades: 1930s; 1940s; 1950s; 1960s; 1970s
- See also: Other events of 1959; List of years in Iraq

Iraqi flag from 1959 to 1963

The following lists events that happened during 1959 in Iraq.

== Incumbents ==
- President: Muhammad Najib ar-Ruba'i
- Prime Minister: Abd al-Karim Qasim

== Events ==
=== March ===
- March 8 – The Mosul uprising began in Iraq as Colonel Abd al-Shawaff staged a rebellion against the government of President Abdul Karim Qasim. al-Shawaaf was killed the next day, and after the insurrection was put down, Qasim ordered the execution of officers suspected of complicity.
- March 24 – Prime Minister Abdel Karim Kassem announced his nation's withdrawal from the Baghdad Pact. The withdrawal had been expected following the July 14, 1958, revolution that overthrew the government of King Feisel II.

=== July ===
- July 14 – In Kirkuk, a rally to celebrate the first anniversary of the 1958 revolution degenerated into a three-day-long massacre of ethnic Turks by the Kurds. At least 30 people were killed, and over 100 injured. The event was ultimately referred to as the Kirkuk Massacre. On the same day, Iraq became the first Arab nation to appoint a woman to a ministerial post, with Dr. Naziha ad-Dulaimi becoming Minister of Rural Affairs.

=== May ===
- May 30 – After the calling off of the 1955 Anglo-Iraqi Agreement, the last British troops in Iraq left peacefully.

=== August ===
- August 19 – The Baghdad Pact, which had been kicked out of Baghdad after Iraq withdrew from the alliance, changed its name to the CENTO, the Central Treaty Organization, with the United Kingdom, Turkey, Pakistan and Iran.

=== September ===
- September 20 – General Nadhim Tabaqchali and 12 other Iraqi officers were executed by a firing squad for their role in the March 1959 Mosul Uprising.

=== October ===
- October 7 – On Baghdad's al-Rashid Street, President Abd al-Karim Qasim was ambushed on his way to the East German embassy. The five man team, led by future Iraqi President Saddam Hussein, killed Qasim's driver and wounded Qasim. One assassin died and Saddam himself was injured, but escaped to farm.

=== December ===
- December 18 – Abd al-Karim Qasim declared that the Khūzestān Province of Iran "was part of Iraqi territory". Tensions over the disputed territory finally triggered the Iran–Iraq War, which lasted from 1980 to 1988.

== Deaths ==
- March 09 - Abd al-Wahab al-Shawaf Iraqi officer and leader of Mosul coup.
- March 09 - Saeb Sabry al-Safi Iraqi officer pilot andl killed during Mosul coup
