= Muhammad Mahdi Kubba =

Iraqi politician (1900–1984)

Muhammad Mahdi Kubba محمد مهدي كبة
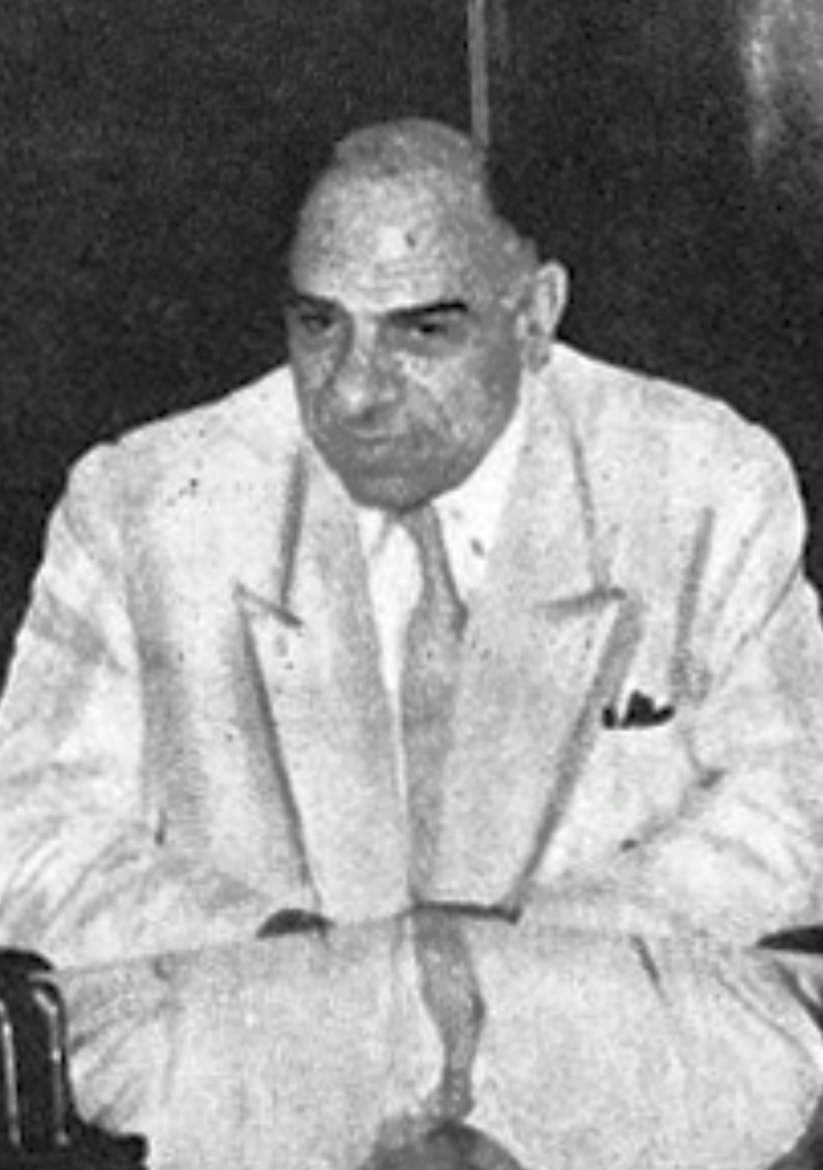

President of the Iraqi Independence Party

Personal details
- Born: 1900 Samarra, Baghdad Vilayet, Ottoman Empire
- Died: 1984 (aged 83–84)
- Party: Iraqi Independence Party

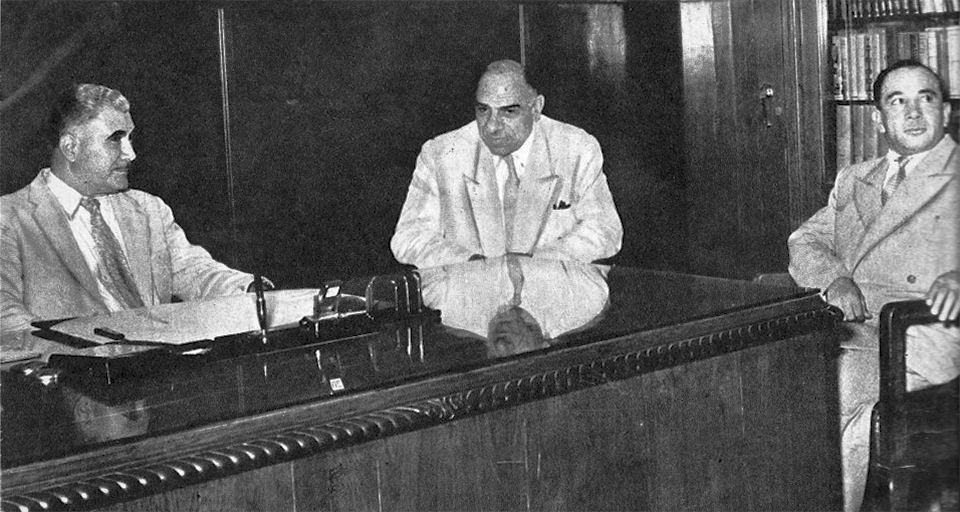
Sovereignty Council of Iraq 1958-1963 (from left Muhammad Najib ar-Ruba'i, Muhammad Mahdi Kubba and Khalid al-Naqshabandi).

Muhammad Mahdi Kubba (Arabic: محمد مهدي كبة) (1900–1984) was an Iraqi politician and Vice President.

Kubba was the President of the Iraqi Independence Party.

== Sovereignty Council ==
In the wake of the 14 July Revolution, the new Iraqi Republic was headed by a Revolutionary Council. At its head was a three-man sovereignty council, composed of members of Iraq’s three main communal/ethnic groups. Kubba was appointed to represent the Shi’a population; Khalid al-Naqshabandi the Kurds; and Najib al Rubay’i the Sunni population. This tripartite was to assume the role of the Presidency. A cabinet was created, composed of a broad spectrum of Iraqi political movements: this included two National Democratic Party representatives, one member of al-Istiqlal, one Ba’ath representative and one Marxist.

Following the failed 1959 Mosul uprising by Arab nationalists, Iraqi Prime Minister Abd al-Karim Qasim grew increasingly dependent on the Iraqi Communist Party, whose distrust of Arab nationalists seemed vindicated to Qasim by the revolt. Qasim allowed the Communist Party to purge the government of pan-Arabists. Kubba, despite his membership of the Sovereignty Council, was put under house arrest. As a result, the last time Kubba attended a meeting of the Sovereignty Council was in February 1959, although no resignation was ever made public.

== Personal life ==
Kubba would later publish his memoirs, Memoirs in the Course of the Events, in 1965.
