= Czech Republic–Iraq relations =

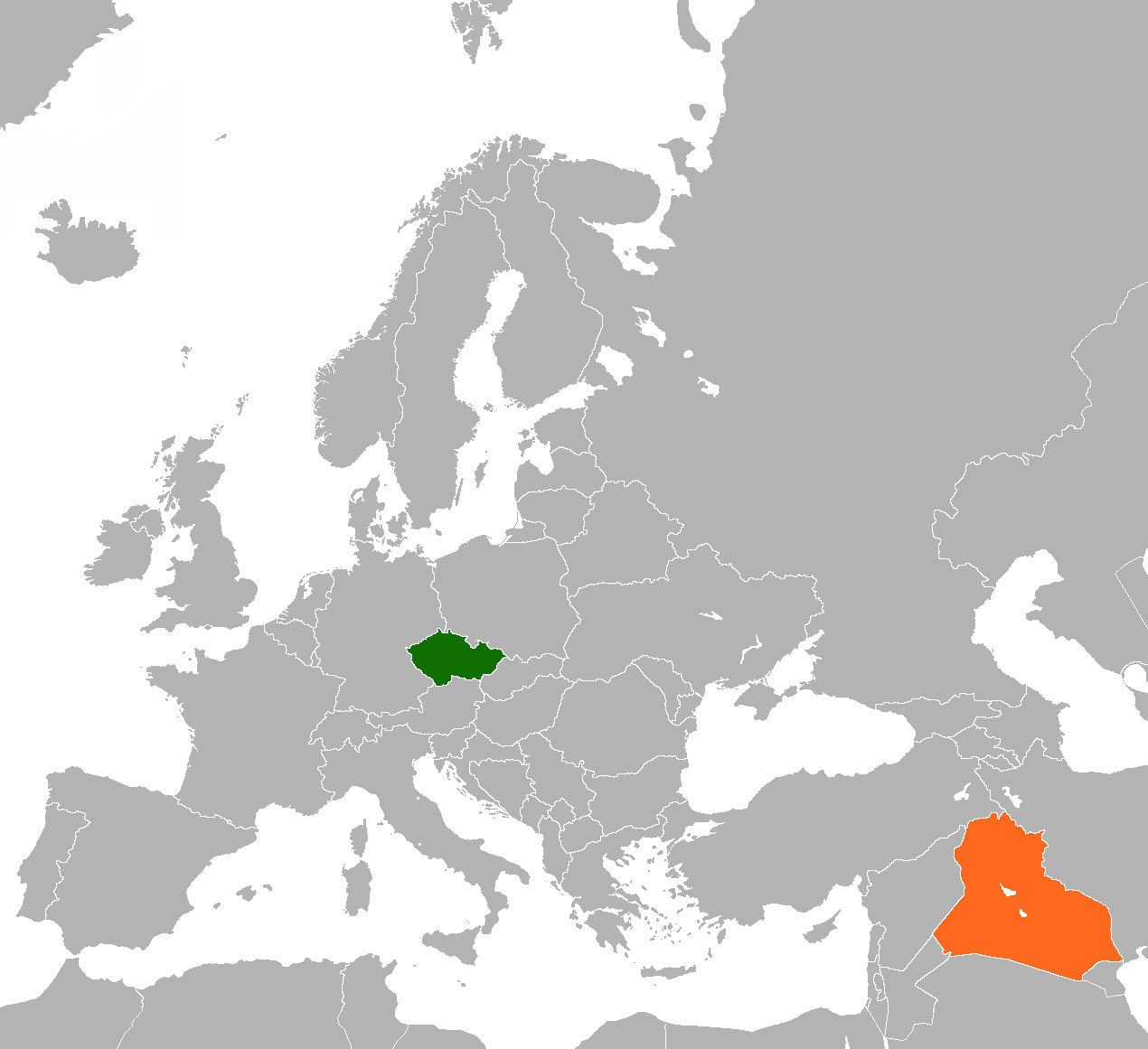
- Czech Republic: Iraq

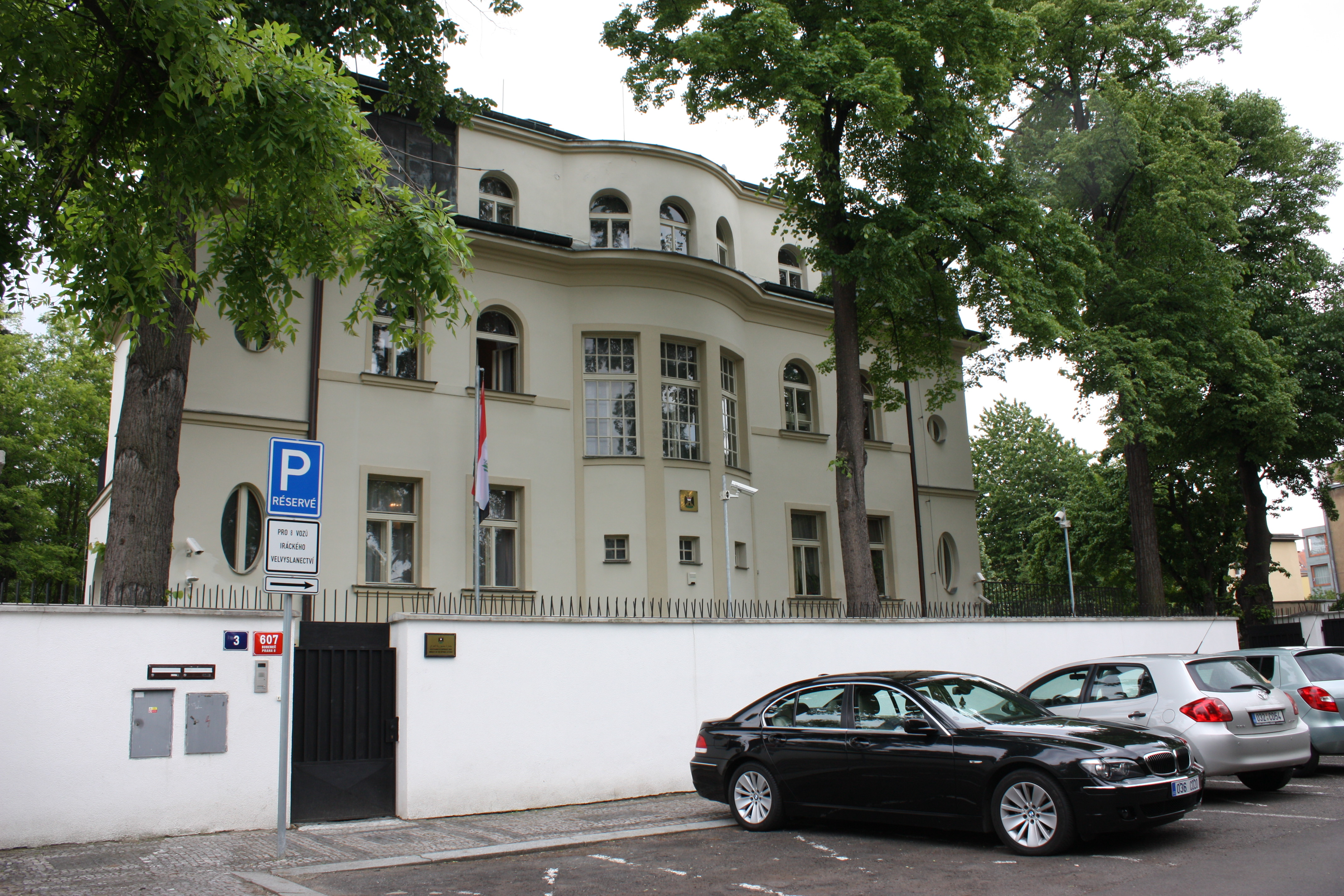
Iraqi embassy in Prague

Czech Republic–Iraq relations are bilateral relations between the Czech Republic and Iraq. The Czech Republic has an embassy in Baghdad, and Iraq has an embassy in Prague. Relations between the two countries span several decades, encompassing military cooperation, foreign and humanitarian aid, significant arms transfers, economic and trade ties, as well as Czech participation as part of the multinational force in Iraq.

== Historical background ==
=== Czechoslovakia and Iraq (pre-1993) ===
Bilateral relations between the two countries predate the independence of the Czech Republic, tracing back to the era of Czechoslovakia. Czechoslovakia maintained diplomatic and trade relations with Iraq before World War II, and was a key early supplier of arms to the nascent Iraqi military following Iraq's independence.

During the Cold War, communist Czechoslovakia became one of the largest arms exporters to Iraq among Soviet Bloc countries. The first deliveries of Czechoslovak military hardware to Iraq took place in 1964, with Iraqi interest in Czechoslovak weapons accelerating following the 1967 Arab-Israeli War. Throughout the 1970s and 1980s, Czechoslovak arms exports to Iraq consisted mainly of jet training aircraft and armoured fighting vehicles. Czechoslovak companies also helped develop the oil industry in Iraq during this period.

During the Gulf War, Czechoslovakia sent a force of 200 troops to take part in Operation Desert Shield and Operation Desert Storm as part of the international coalition. The unit specialised in chemical defence and decontamination—a major concern given Saddam Hussein's previous use of chemical agents during the Iran–Iraq War. This was the first armed conflict in which Czechoslovak troops had participated since World War II. Following the Gulf War, Czechoslovakia and subsequently the Czech Republic participated in United Nations sanctions against Iraq from 1990 until 2003.

=== Czech Republic (post-1993) ===
After the peaceful dissolution of Czechoslovakia in 1993, the Czech Republic inherited the foreign relations framework of its predecessor state. With the fall of communism and the Czech Republic's subsequent integration into NATO in 1999 and the European Union in 2004, the nature of Czech–Iraqi relations shifted significantly—from a Cold War arms-supply relationship to a partnership oriented around post-conflict reconstruction, security capacity building, and trade.

== Military cooperation ==
=== 2003 Iraq War and Multinational Force ===
The Czech Republic's largest post-1993 military involvement in Iraq took place within the framework of the US-led coalition that led to the overthrow of Saddam Hussein's regime in 2003. In a period of under six years, over 2,300 Czech soldiers served in Iraq. The first Czech troops deployed were military doctors and medical staff operating a field hospital in Basra, in southern Iraq, under British command. Medical workers were later replaced by military police officers, who trained over 12,000 Iraqi policemen at the Shaiba base. Other Czech soldiers helped guard the base adjacent to Basra Airport and later began training the Iraqi Army in Baghdad.

The original Czech contingent consisted of 300 troops and three civilians. After 2006, the focus shifted from training Iraqi police to providing force protection at Contingency Operation Base Basrah Air Station. Two thirds of these soldiers were withdrawn by late 2007, and 80 of the remaining 100 were withdrawn in summer 2008. The remaining 17 Taji-based Czech troops, who had been training Iraqi soldiers in the use of armoured vehicles, were withdrawn in December 2008, leaving five troops supporting the NATO Training Mission – Iraq (NTM-I). A ceremony marking the end of the main Czech mission was held on 4 December 2008. One Czech soldier died in May 2003 from injuries sustained in a vehicle accident in Iraq.

=== Counter-ISIS operations and NATO Mission Iraq ===
Following the rise of ISIS/Daesh and its capture of Mosul in 2014, the Czech Republic renewed its military engagement in Iraq. In August 2014, the Czech Republic sent 500 tonnes of ammunition to Kurdish Peshmerga forces fighting ISIS.

Czech military personnel were deployed across several missions within the Global Coalition Against Daesh framework, including an air force advisory team (2016–2019), an Italian-led police training mission (2017–2020), a chemical protection training team (2019–2020), and a field surgical team (2016–2017). Czech soldiers were stationed at Balad Air Base—Iraq's largest air base, approximately 50 kilometres north of Baghdad—and at the Taji base northwest of Baghdad, where chemists from Liberec trained Iraqi soldiers in specialised chemical units. Czech military police also helped train Iraqi police officers in Baghdad.

The Czech Republic has participated in the NATO Mission Iraq (NMI), a non-combat advisory mission established at the request of the Iraqi government in 2018, focused on training and capacity building for Iraqi security forces. As of October 2023, 11 Czech personnel were deployed in the structures of Operation Inherent Resolve and NATO Mission Iraq. The Czech Republic's participation was suspended in March 2020 due to the COVID-19 pandemic and security instability in the region, but was resumed after six months.

=== L-159 aircraft sale ===
A significant element of Czech–Iraqi military cooperation has been the sale of Aero Vodochody L-159 ALCA light combat aircraft to the Iraqi Air Force. In April 2014, Aero Vodochody signed a contract for the delivery of ten single-seat L-159As and two twin-seat L-159T1s to the Iraqi Air Force. In early 2015, Iraq formalised a deal for 14 aircraft in total (12 L-159As and two L-159T1s). The first two aircraft were delivered to Iraq on 5 November 2015.

The L-159s were deployed by the Iraqi Air Force in active combat against ISIS, participating in strikes on ISIL positions in Fallujah in May 2016 and during the Battle of Mosul in October and November 2016. To support Iraqi pilots, the Czech Republic deployed a Czech Air Advisory Team comprising approximately 30–35 instructors and specialists from the 21st Tactical Air Force Base at Čáslav to Balad Air Base, from June 2016 through to 2018, at a cost of 265 million koruna. In 2017, Aero Vodochody formally restarted production of the L-159 to manufacture a new-build T1 variant for Iraq—the first new production of the type in 13 years. Iraqi pilots trained on Czech L-159s also undertook transition training to American F-16 Fighting Falcons, reflecting the depth of Czech aviation cooperation with the Iraqi Air Force.

== Humanitarian and development aid ==
The Czech Republic has provided substantial humanitarian and development assistance to Iraq, particularly in the aftermath of the ISIS conflict. Between 2012 and 2022, total Czech civilian material aid to Iraq exceeded 15 million USD, encompassing direct humanitarian aid, resiliency support, medical care, civilian training projects, and contributions to international aid agencies active in Iraq.

Specific contributions include a donation of USD 200,000 to the UNDP's Funding Facility for Immediate Stabilisation (FFIS), which channelled fast-track support to rehabilitate civic infrastructure and kick-start local economies in areas liberated from ISIS. Czech NGOs, including Caritas Czech Republic, also stepped up humanitarian operations in Mosul and surrounding areas following the city's liberation. The Czech Republic has also provided development aid to Iraq's Kurdistan Region, including funding for school construction and medical equipment for hospitals in isolated areas.

== Economic relations ==
=== Historical trade ties ===
The economic relationship between the two countries has deep historical roots. Czechoslovak state companies were involved in developing the Iraqi oil industry during the 1970s and 1980s. After the 2003 war, Czech companies began rebuilding commercial ties with Iraq; by 2009, mutual trade had tripled year-on-year to approximately three billion Czech crowns. Czech exports to Iraq dominated this trade, covering sectors including oil technologies, transportation, engineering, and wastewater management, with imports from Iraq remaining negligible.

=== Contemporary trade and investment ===
Trade relations have continued to expand significantly in the 2020s. Czech exports to Iraq reached 4.8 billion CZK in 2023, rising to an estimated 5.7 billion CZK in 2024. Imports from Iraq—virtually non-existent in earlier years—grew substantially, with oil accounting for 99 percent of Iraqi goods imported into the Czech Republic.

Czech companies have been active across a range of sectors in Iraq, including energy, oil and gas extraction and processing, water management, environmental protection, infrastructure, healthcare, agriculture, construction, information technology, and telecommunications. Key Czech companies with a presence in Iraq include Škoda Auto, Aero Vodochody, and UNIS, a company specialising in oil, gas processing, and petrochemical industries.

=== High-level visits and agreements ===
In May 2023, Czech Foreign Minister Jan Lipavský visited Baghdad, where he met Iraqi President Abdullatif Rashid, Prime Minister Mohammed Al-Sudani, and Foreign Minister Fuad Hussein. The visit included a business forum attended by a delegation of 15 Czech businessmen, focused on the possibilities of Czech companies' involvement in Iraq's post-ISIS reconstruction and development.

In February 2025, Iraqi Prime Minister Mohammed Al-Sudani made an official visit to Prague, meeting Czech President Petr Pavel and Prime Minister Petr Fiala. The two sides oversaw the signing of five memoranda of understanding covering oil supply, transportation, security, aviation, and environmental cooperation. Prime Minister Fiala noted that Iraq could become one of the important suppliers of oil to the Czech Republic, helping to diversify away from dependence on Russian energy sources. Iraqi PM Sudani also invited Czech companies to participate in Iraq's ambitious Development Road infrastructure project, which envisages a transport corridor from southern Iraq to the Turkish border.

In July 2025, the two countries began formal negotiations on a bilateral Investment Protection Agreement, with discussions held in Prague led by Iraq's National Investment Commission and the Czech Ministry of Finance. The agreement is intended to facilitate technology transfer, create jobs, and support economic development in both countries.

== Resident diplomatic missions ==
- the Czech Republic has an embassy in Baghdad.
- Iraq has an embassy in Prague.

== See also ==
- Foreign relations of the Czech Republic
- Foreign relations of Iraq
- Czech Republic–Kurdistan Region relations
- Czechoslovakia in the Gulf War
- NATO Mission Iraq
- Aero L-159 ALCA
- Iraq–European Union relations
