= Czech Republic–Kurdistan Region relations =

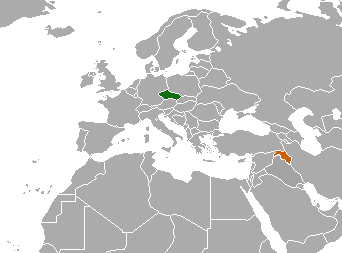
- Czech Republic: Kurdistan Region

Czech Republic–Kurdistan Region relations are bilateral relations between the Czech Republic and the Kurdistan Region. (Note: While Kurdistan Region refers to the autonomous Kurdish region in Northern Iraq, Iraqi Kurdistan is a geographical term referring to the Kurdish area of Iraq.) The Czech Republic is represented in the Kurdistan Region through a consulate general in Erbil since 2006, while the Kurdistan region has no representation in the Czech Republic. Relations between the two are characterized by high level talks and cooperation against ISIS. Kurdish President Massoud Barzani visited the Czech Republic in 2015, meeting President Miloš Zeman and other senior government officials. In November 2015, Czech President Miloš Zeman said that he believes the Kurdistan Region will soon become independent.

== History ==
=== Czechoslovak contacts with Kurdish rebels during the Iraqi Republic (1958-1968) ===
Prague recognized Abd al-Karim Qasim's government on 16 July 1958, and also maintained relations with Kurdish rebels and Iraqi communists. In 1959, a few weeks after the opening of the Czechoslovak embassy in Baghdad, the secretary of the Czech ambassador met with Mustafa Barzani, leader of the Kurdistan Democratic Party, in Baghdad. In 1960, Iraq and Czechoslovakia signed a protocol on scientific and technical cooperation and Iraqi students, a majority of them Kurds, travelled to Czechoslovakia to study.

After the Ba'athist takeover in 1963, Czechoslovakia ended its support for the Iraqi regime and shifted focus towards the Iraqi Communist Party and the Kurds, both of whom were in opposition. Prague established diplomatic ties with the new regime in February 1963, but maintained contacts with the Kurdistan Democratic Party, and Mustafa Barzani. In July 1963, the governing Communist Party of Czechoslovakia adopted policies with the aim of isolating Baghdad internationally, using the Kurds and the communists. Officially, the position of Czechoslovakia regarding Kurdish matters in Iraq was to maintain a position of restraint and not condemn or condone anything. Furthermore, Prague would support the Iraqi government but continue to raise the Kurdish issue internationally to seek a solution and an end to the Kurdish genocide. This was disclosed from a report from 23 July 1963. In this period, Prague did not allow any activity in Iraq that was associated with fighting the Kurds.

The Kurdish leader and member of the Kurdistan Democratic Party Jalal Talabani visited Prague in July 1963, where he held talks with the Czechoslovak Committee of Solidarity with the Nations of Asia and Africa. During his visit, he urged Prague to provide the Kurds with moral, financial and military support. The Czechoslovak government subsequently decided to send light weapons to about 2,000 Kurdish fighters, but it was not possible to transport the weapons from Czechoslovakia to the Kurdistan Region. Eventually, Prague decided to give to the Kurds the money raised from weapons sales to Baghdad, a policy which continued despite criticism from Baghdad. In 1965 Barzani sent a letter to the Permanent Mission of Czechoslovakia to the United Nations urging Prague to stop supplying arms to the Iraqi regime, but his request was ignored.

In 1975, when Prague began returning Kurdish students to the Ba'athist regime, students led by Yekta Uzunoglu began a hunger strike to protest the measures.

=== Czech Republic (2003-2013) ===
After a deterioration of relations between Czechoslovakia and Iraq due to the Iraq-Iran war, and the Czech Republic's participation in sanctions against Iraq from 1990 to 2003, the Czech Republic focused primarily on the reconstruction of Iraq, but in 2006 a liaison office was opened in Erbil and cultural exhibitions have been held in the Kurdistan Region in this period.

=== Strengthen of ties and military aid (2014-) ===
In 2015, a Czech-Kurdish Chamber of Commerce was founded with the aim of promoting development and growth between Czech companies in the Kurdistan Region and vice versa. In March 2017, the Czech government announced that they would invest in the Kurdish agriculture sector.

The Czech Republic has been aiding Kurdish military forces (Peshmerga) since 2014, when ISIS entered Iraq and captured Mosul. In August 2014, the Czech Republic sent Kurdistan 500 tons of ammunition for Kalashnikovs, machine guns, bazookas and 500 hand grenades. The shipment mostly consisted of arms not used any longer by the Czech military. In December 2014, the Czech government announced that 5,000 anti-tank missiles were en route to Kurdistan for the fight against ISIS. In January 2016, Czech Deputy Defense Minister Jakub Landovsky visited Erbil to discuss bilateral ties and the fight against ISIS. Landovsky also visited a Peshmerga base in Gwer near Mosul. In the same month, after a meeting with high-ranking Czech officials, the Czech Prime Minister Bohuslav Sobotka announced that his country would send Kurdistan more rifles and ammunition.

The Czech Republic has also been training Peshmerga in mine-clearance operations and training Kurdish doctors in Paris, and operates some construction projects in the region.
