= Jalal al-Awqati =

Jalal al-Awqati (Died 8 February 1963) was an Iraqi communist military officer and Brigadier General who was the Chief of the Iraqi Air Force during the final days of the regime of Abd al-Karim Qasim. He was assassinated in the early morning hours of 8 February 1963 during the Ramadan Revolution, after which tank units occupied the Abu Ghraib radio station.

Awqati was a revered politician during the time of his reign. Among the Iraqi public, a saying became popularized which read: “Jalal Al-Awqati, our coming leader” (Arabic: جلال الأوقاتي، زعيمنا الآتي).
