= Military junta =

Government led by a committee of military leaders

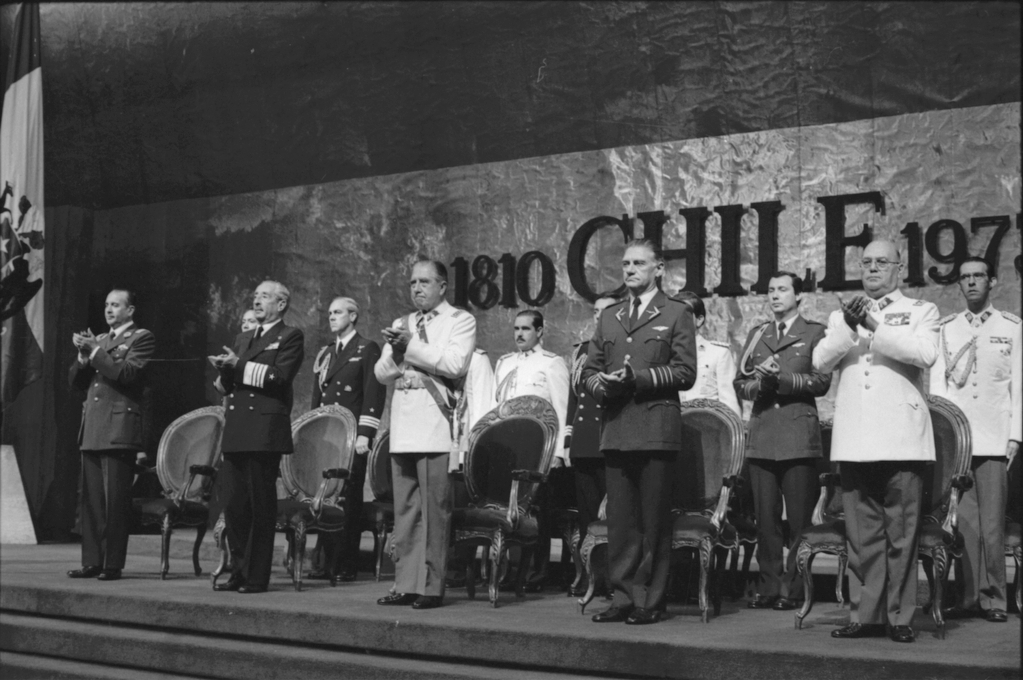
The Chilean military junta, led by Augusto Pinochet in March 1986

A military junta (/ˈhʊntə, ˈdʒʌntə/) is a system of government led by a committee of military leaders. The term junta means "meeting" or "committee" and originated in the national and local junta organized by the Spanish resistance to Napoleon's invasion of Spain in 1808. The term is now used to refer to an authoritarian form of government characterized by a politically dominant group of military officers.

== Features ==
A junta often comes to power as a result of a coup d'état. The junta may either formally take power as the nation's governing body, with the power to rule by decree, or may wield power by exercising binding (but informal) control over a nominally civilian government. These two forms of junta rule are sometimes called open rule and disguised rule. Disguised rule may take the form of either civilianization or indirect rule. Civilianization occurs when a junta publicly ends its obviously military features but continues its dominance. For example, the junta may terminate the martial law, forgo military uniforms in favor of civilian attire, "colonize" government with former military officers, and make use of political parties or mass organizations. "Indirect rule" involves the junta's exertion of concealed, behind-the-scenes control over a civilian puppet. Indirect rule by the military can include either broad control over the government or control over a narrower set of policy areas, such as military or national security matters.

== History ==
Throughout the 20th century, military juntas were frequently seen in Latin America, typically in the form of an "institutionalized, highly corporate/professional junta" headed by the commanding officers of the different military branches (army, navy, and air force), and sometimes joined by the head of the national police or other key bodies. Political scientist Samuel Finer, writing in 1988, noted that juntas in Latin America tended to be smaller than juntas elsewhere; the median junta had 11 members, while Latin American juntas typically had three or four. "Corporate" military coups have been distinguished from "factional" military coups. The former are carried out by the armed forces as an institution, led by senior commanders at the top of the military hierarchy, while the latter are carried out by a segment of the armed forces and are often led by mid-ranking officers.

A 2014 study published in the Annual Review of Political Science journal found that military regimes behaved differently from both civilian dictatorships and autocratic military strongmen. A military regime is ruled by a group of high-ranking officers, whereas a military strongman is a single dictator. The study found that (1) "strongmen and military regimes are more likely to commit human rights abuses and become embroiled in civil wars than are civilian dictatorships"; (2) "military strongmen start more international wars than either military regimes or civilian dictators, perhaps because they have more reason to fear postouster exile, prison, or assassination" and (3) military regimes and civilian dictatorships are more likely to end in democratization, in contrast to the rule of military strongmen, which more often ends by insurgency, popular uprising, or invasion.

== Current examples ==
=== Africa ===
- Burkina Faso – Patriotic Movement for Safeguard and Restoration (2022–present)
- Guinea-Bissau – High Military Command for the Restoration of Order (2025–present)
- Madagascar – Council of the Presidency for the Re-Foundation of the Republic of Madagascar (2025–present)
- Mali – Transitional Administration (2021–present)
- Niger – National Council for the Safeguard of the Homeland (2023–present)
- Sudan – Transitional Sovereignty Council (2021–present)

== Former examples ==
=== Africa ===
- Algeria – Revolutionary Council (1965–1976), High Council of State (1992–1994)
- Burkina Faso – National Council for Democracy (2015)
- Chad – Transitional Military Council (2021–2022), Transitional Administration (2022–2024)
- Egypt – Free Officers movement (Egypt) (1949–1953), the National Union (United Arab Republic) (1957–1962), the Arab Socialist Union (Egypt) 1962–rebranded in 1978 to National Democratic Party (Egypt), Supreme Council of the Armed Forces (2011–2012).
- Equatorial Guinea – Supreme Military Council (1979–1982)
- Ethiopia – Derg (1974–1987)
- Gabon – Committee for the Transition and Restoration of Institutions (2023–2025)
- The Gambia – Armed Forces Provisional Ruling Council (1994–1996)
- Ghana – National Liberation Council (1966–1969), Supreme Military Council (1975–1979), Provisional National Defence Council (1981–1993)
- Guinea – Military Committee of National Restoration (1984–1991), National Council for Democracy and Development (2008–2010), National Committee of Reconciliation and Development (2021–2025)
- Liberia – People's Redemption Council (1980–1984)
- Libya – Revolutionary Command Council (1969–1977), Socialist People's Libyan Arab Jamahiriya (1977–2011)
- Madagascar – Military Directorate (2009), 2025 Malagasy coup d'état (2025–)
- Mali – Military Committee for National Liberation (1968–1979), National Committee for the Salvation of the People (2020–2021)
- Mauritania – Military Committee for National Recovery (1978–1979), Military Committee for National Salvation (1979–1992), Military Council for Justice and Democracy (2005–2007), High Council of State (2008–2009)
- Niger – Supreme Council for the Restoration of Democracy (2010–2011)
- Nigeria – Military juntas (1966–1979 and 1983–1999)
- Sierra Leone – National Reformation Council (1967–1968)
- Somalia – Supreme Revolutionary Council (1969–1976 and 1980–1991)
- Sudan – National Revolutionary Command Council (1969–1971), Revolutionary Command Council for National Salvation (1989–1993), Transitional Military Council (1985–1986), Transitional Military Council (2019)
- Zaire – Dictatorship of Mobutu Sese Seko (1965–1997)

=== Americas ===
- Argentina – Argentine Revolution (1966–1973), National Reorganization Process (1976–1983)
- Bolivia – Bolivian military juntas (1861, 1879–1880, 1899, 1920–1921, 1930–1931, 1936–1938, 1943–1944, 1946–1947, 1951–1952, 1964–1966, 1970–1971 and 1980–1982)
- Brazil – Brazilian military juntas of 1930 and 1969 (part of the wider 1964–1985 military dictatorship)
- Chile – Government Junta (1973–1990)
- Colombia – Military Junta (1957–1958)
- Cuba – Dictatorship of Fulgencio Batista (1952–1959)
- Dominican Republic – El Trujillato (1930–1961)
- Ecuador – Military Junta (1963), Supreme Council of Government (1976–1979), National Salvation Junta (2000)
- El Salvador – Civic Directory (1931), Junta of Government (1960–1961), Civic-Military Directory (1961–1962), Revolutionary Government Junta (1979–1982)
- Guatemala – Military juntas (1954), Military junta (1957)
- Grenada – Military rule of Hudson Austin (1983)
- Haiti – Junta of the 1991 Haitian coup d'état (1991–1994)
- Honduras – Military junta (1956–1957)
- Mexico – Porfiriato (1876–1911)
- Nicaragua – Junta of National Reconstruction (1979–1985)
- Paraguay – Dictatorship of Alfredo Stroessner (1954–1989)
- Peru – Military junta (1962–1963), Revolutionary Government of the Armed Forces of Peru (1968–1980)
- Suriname – National Military Council (1980–1987)
- Uruguay – Military junta (1973–1985)
- Venezuela – Dictatorship of Cipriano Castro (1899–1908), Dictatorship of Juan Vicente Gómez (1908–1913), Military junta of Marcos Pérez Jiménez (1948–1958)

=== Asia ===
- Armenia – Dashnak government of the First Republic of Armenia (1918–1920)
- Azerbaijan (Note: Part of Asia and Europe) – Premiership of Surat Huseynov (1993–1994)
- Bangladesh – Military-backed regime of Khondaker Mostaq Ahmad (1975), military interim government led by Chief Justice Abu Sadat Mohammad Sayem (1975–1976) and later Ziaur Rahman (1976–1978), military government of Hussain Muhammad Ershad (1982–1986) and military-backed caretaker government led by Fakhruddin Ahmed (2007–2009)
- Cambodia – Khmer Republic (1970–1975), Democratic Kampuchea (1975–1979)
- China (Republic of) – Temporary Provisions against the Communist Rebellion (1948–1991) used by the Kuomintang after the fall of mainland China to the Communists
- Georgia – Military Council of the Republic of Georgia (1992)
- Indonesia – Military government of Suharto, also known as the New Order (1966–1998)
- Iran – Government of Fazlollah Zahedi (1953–1955) and Gholam Reza Azhari (1978–1979)
- Iraq – Sovereignty Council (1958–1963) and Revolutionary Command Council (1968–2003)
- Japan – Shogunate period (1185–1868)
- Myanmar – Caretaker Government (1958–1960), Revolutionary Council of the Union of Burma (1962–1974), State Law and Order Restoration Council (1988–1997), State Peace and Development Council (1997–2011), the State Administration Council (2021–2025), the National Defence and Security Council (2025–2026)
- Pakistan – Military governments of Ayub Khan (1958–1969), Yahya Khan (1969–1971), Muhammad Zia-ul-Haq (1977–1988) and Pervez Musharraf (1999–2008)
- Philippines – Government of Emilio Aguinaldo (1899)
- South Korea – Military governments of Park Chung Hee (1962–1979, initially as the Supreme Council for National Reconstruction) and Chun Doo-hwan (1980–1988)
- Syria – Supreme Arab Revolutionary Command of the Armed Forces (1961–1961/1962/1963, exact date of rule end is unknown) and National Council for the Revolutionary Command (with Military Committee of the Ba'ath Party) (1963–1966)
- Thailand – National Peace Keeping Council (1991–1992), Council for National Security (2006–2008), National Council for Peace and Order (2014–2019)
- Turkey – National Unity Committee (1960–1961), National Security Council (1980–1983)
- Republic of Vietnam – Provisional Government of South Vietnam (1963–1967)
- Yemen Arab Republic – Revolutionary Command Council (1962–1967) and Military Command Council (1974–1978)

=== Europe ===
- Bulgaria – Junta of the 1934 Bulgarian coup d'état (1934–1935)
- Commonwealth of England – The Protectorate (1653–1660)
- Greece – Revolutionary Council (1967–1974)
- Poland – Military Council of National Salvation (1981–1983)
- Portugal – National Salvation Junta (1974–1975)
- Russia - White movement (1918–1920)
- Spain – Military directorate of Miguel Primo de Rivera (1923–1925), National Defense Junta (1936), State Technical Junta (1936–38, largely powerless)

=== Oceania ===
- Fiji – Military government of Frank Bainimarama (2006–2014)

== See also ==
- Civilian control of the military
- Civil–military relations
- Stratocracy
