= Sovereignty Council of Iraq =

1958–1963 presidential council of Iraq

Sovereignty Council مجلس السيادة
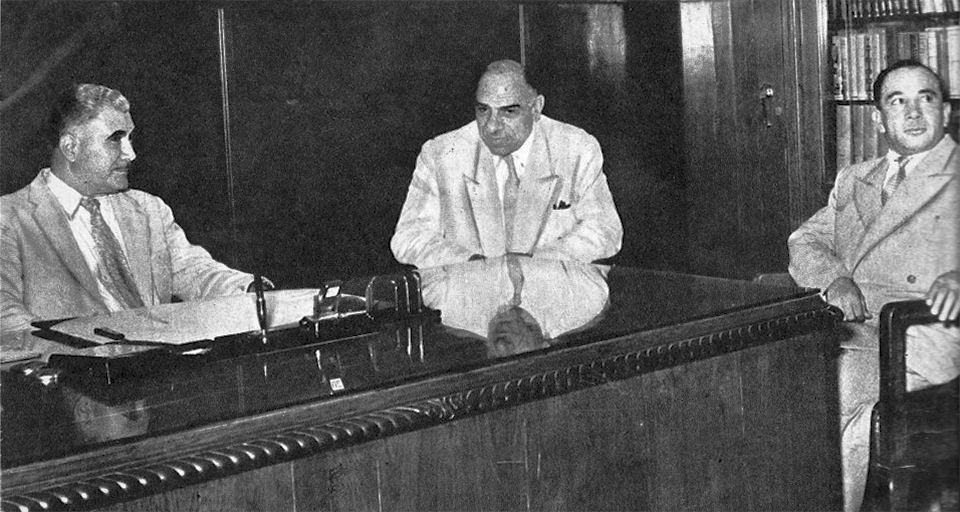
- Council members. From left Muhammad Najib ar-Ruba'i, Muhammad Mahdi Kubba and Khalid al-Naqshabandi.
- Formation: 14 July 1958
- Dissolved: 8 February 1963
- Type: Acting Presidency
- Legal status: Dissolved by the Leadership of coup February 1963
- Purpose: Carry out tasks as president of Iraq and ratification on government legislation
- Headquarters: Baghdad Iraq
- Location: Iraqi Republic
- Region served: Iraqi Republic
- Official language: Arabic
- Chairman: Muhammad Najib ar-Ruba'i
- Affiliations: Government of Iraq; Iraqi Army; President of Iraq

The Sovereignty Council of Iraq was a presidential council formed in the wake of the military coup on 14 July 1958. It administered the functions of the Presidency of the Republic of Iraq. It was dissolved in the wake of the 8 February 1963 coup.

== Functions of the Council ==
According to the 20th article of the Iraqi Interim constitution of 1958, the council had the authority of the Presidency in the Republic of Iraq on a temporary basis, until a presidential election was held (The Presidency Council has the authority of the President and two deputies).

== Authority ==
According to the 21st article of the interim constitution, the Council approved legislation issued by the Government. The same article granted legislative power to the Council of Ministers. The purpose of the Sovereignty Council was to authenticate the legislation issued by the government. The council was incapable of exercising objection to government legislation, as the real power lay in the hands of Prime Minister Abd al-Karim Qasim. In 1959 Abd al-Karim Qasim dissolved the council, and then re-established it. The council was dissolved quietly after the success of the coup on 8 February 1963.

== Council members ==
- Muhammad Najib ar-Ruba'i was Chairman of the council and President of Iraq by virtue of the Functions of the council. He remained in office from 14 July 1958 till 8 February 1963. He was not subjected to prosecution after the coup. He died in Baghdad in 1965 and was honored by a state funeral.
- Muhammad Mahdi Kubba (born 1900, Samarra – died 1984). Soon after the failed Mosul uprising in 1959 he was put under house arrest. His final appearance at a meeting of the Sovereignty Council was in February 1959, although no resignation was made public.
- Khalid al-Naqshabandi (born 1916, Amadiya), died in office in November 1961.
- Rashad Arif (born 1910), appointed on 1 December 1961
- Abd al-Majid Kamunah (born 1911, Karbala), appointed on 1 December 1961
