= Sovereignty Council =

Sovereignty Council may refer to a collective head of state from Iraq or Sudan:

== In Iraq ==
- Sovereignty Council of Iraq

== In Sudan ==
- Sudanese Sovereignty Council (1956)
- Sudanese Sovereignty Council (1964)
- Sudanese Sovereignty Council (1965)
- Sudanese Sovereignty Council (1986)
- Sovereignty Council of Sudan (2019)
- Transitional Sovereignty Council (2019–2021, 2021-present)
