= Attempted assassination of Abdul-Karim Qasim =

1959 event in Baghdad, Iraq

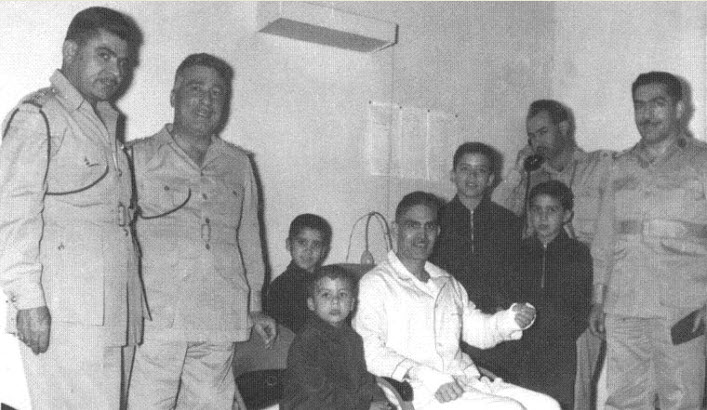
- Prime Minister Abdul Karim Qasim is lying in the hospital after the failure of the assassination attempt. From right to left: Farid Mahmoud, director of military movements, Hafez Alwan, the prime minister's aide, and the sons of Fadel Abbas Al-Mahdawi, president of the People's Court, standing on the left with Ismail Al-Arif, minister of education.
- Date: October 7, 1959; 67 years ago
- Location: Al-Rashid Street, Baghdad, Iraq
- Motive: Regime change
- Target: Abdul-Karim Qasim
- Perpetrator: Arab Socialist Ba'ath Party
- Deaths: 2
- Injuries: 1 (including Qasim)

On October 7, 1959, Iraq’s Prime Minister Abdul-Karim Qasim, was ambushed in an attempted assassination. The ambush was organized by members of the Arab Socialist Ba'ath Party, including Saddam Hussein, as part of broader efforts to remove Qasim due to his nationalist policies, which had alienated pan-Arabist movements and various opposition factions. The assassination attempt took place on Al-Rashid Street in Baghdad and resulted in Qasim sustaining non-fatal injuries. Although the plot failed, it had far-reaching consequences for Iraq’s political landscape.

== Background ==
Abdul-Karim Qasim emerged as a central figure in Iraqi politics following the 14 July Revolution in 1958, which overthrew the Hashemite monarchy and established a republic. As Prime Minister, Qasim pursued a nationalist agenda, emphasizing Iraq's sovereignty and adopting a policy of "Iraq First" (wataniyah). This approach led to strained relations with pan-Arab movements, particularly the United Arab Republic (UAR) led by Egyptian President Gamal Abdel Nasser. Qasim's alliance with the Iraqi Communist Party further alienated pan-Arab factions, including the Arab Socialist Ba'ath Party, which advocated for Arab unity.

== Assassination attempt ==
On October 7, 1959, Qasim's motorcade was ambushed on Al-Rashid Street in Baghdad by a group of Ba'athist conspirators, including a young Saddam Hussein. The plan involved coordinated gunfire intended to kill Qasim and his entourage. However, the operation did not proceed as intended; reports suggest that Saddam Hussein began shooting prematurely, causing confusion among the assailants. Qasim's chauffeur was killed, and Qasim sustained injuries to his arm and shoulder but survived the attack.

== Aftermath ==
In the immediate aftermath, Radio Baghdad announced that the Prime Minister was not seriously hurt, urged the Iraqi people to remain calm, and established a curfew for the night of October 7. The failed assassination attempt had profound implications for Iraq's political landscape. Qasim's survival led to a crackdown on opposition groups, particularly targeting the Ba'ath Party. Many conspirators, including Saddam Hussein, fled Iraq to avoid arrest; Saddam escaped to Syria and later to Egypt, where he remained until Qasim's overthrow in 1963. The incident elevated the profile of the Ba'ath Party and Saddam Hussein, setting the stage for their future political ascendancy.

In 1997, Saddam also undertook a crossing of the Tigris River to commemorate his own role in the assassination.

On December 18, 1959, an estimated half a million individuals participated in a demonstration expressing support for Qasim. Shortly after, on December 26, 1959, the People's Court initiated proceedings against individuals accused of involvement in the attack. In the aftermath of the assassination attempt, Qasim's governance increasingly shifted toward a personalist dictatorship.

== Allegations of foreign involvement ==
There have been allegations suggesting that foreign intelligence agencies, notably the CIA and Egyptian intelligence, may have had knowledge of or involvement in the assassination attempt. However, concrete evidence remains inconclusive, and pertinent contemporary records relating to CIA operations in Iraq have remained classified or heavily redacted, allowing for plausible deniability. It is generally accepted that Egypt, in some capacity, was involved in the assassination attempt, and that "[t]he United States was working with Nasser on some level." Historian Kenneth Osgood notes that "the circumstantial evidence is such that the possibility of US–UAR collaboration with Ba'ath Party activists cannot be ruled out," concluding that "[w]hatever the validity of [these] charges, at the very least currently declassified documents reveal that US officials were actively considering various plots against Qasim and that the CIA was building up assets for covert operations in Iraq."
