= Saeb Sabry al-Safi =

Iraqi fighter pilot (1936–1959

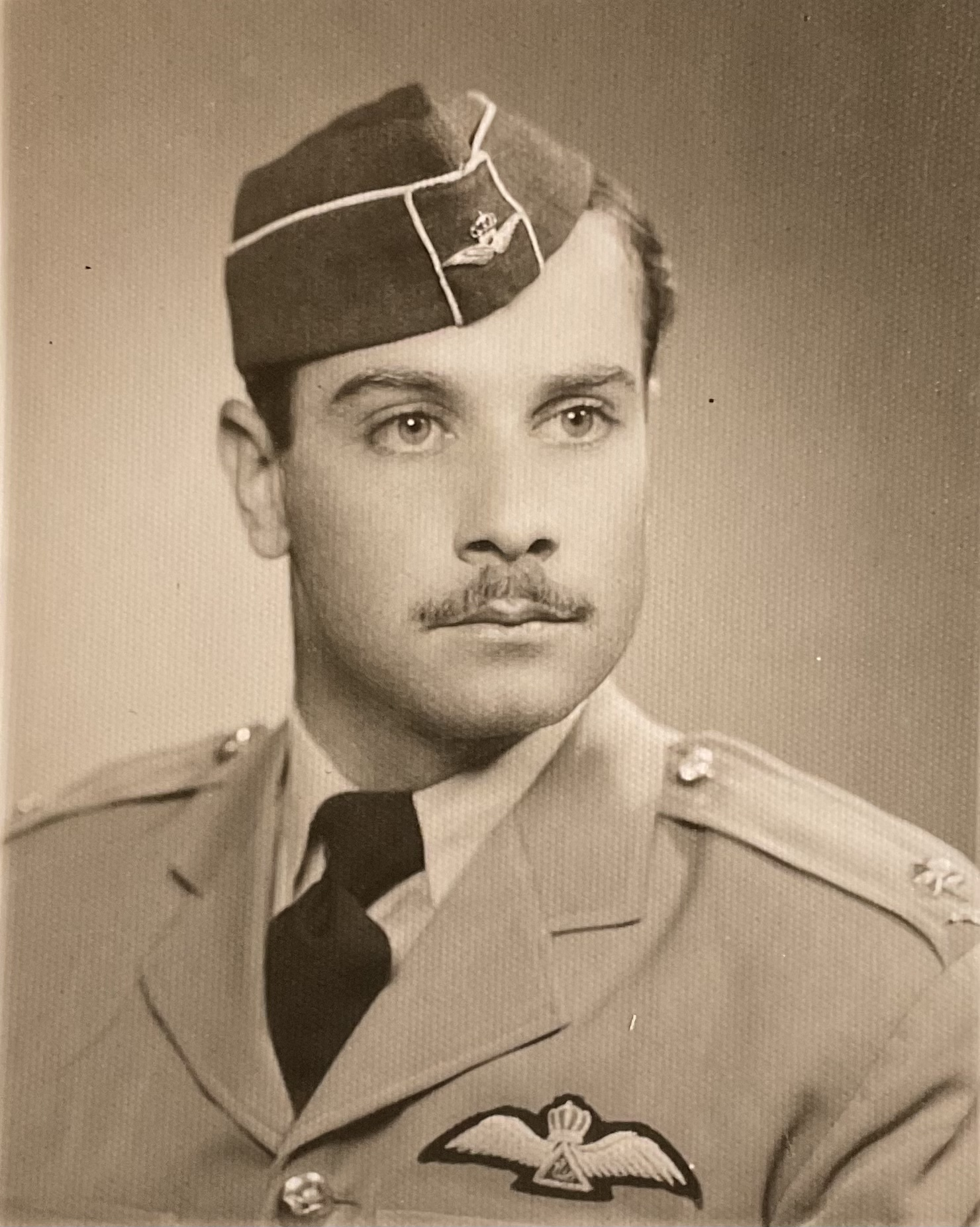
- Portail of Lieutenant Saeb Sabry al-Safi
- Native name: صائب صبري الصافي العركوب
- Born: Saeb Sabry al-Safi al-Arkoub; 1936; Mosul, Kingdom of Iraq
- Died: 9 March 1959 (aged 22–23) Iraq–Syria border, Nineveh, First Republic of Iraq
- Cause of death: Suicide by gunshot
- Allegiance: Kingdom of Iraq (1950s–1958); First Republic of Iraq (1958–1959)
- Branch: Royal Iraqi Air Force; Iraqi Air Force
- Service years: 1950s–1959
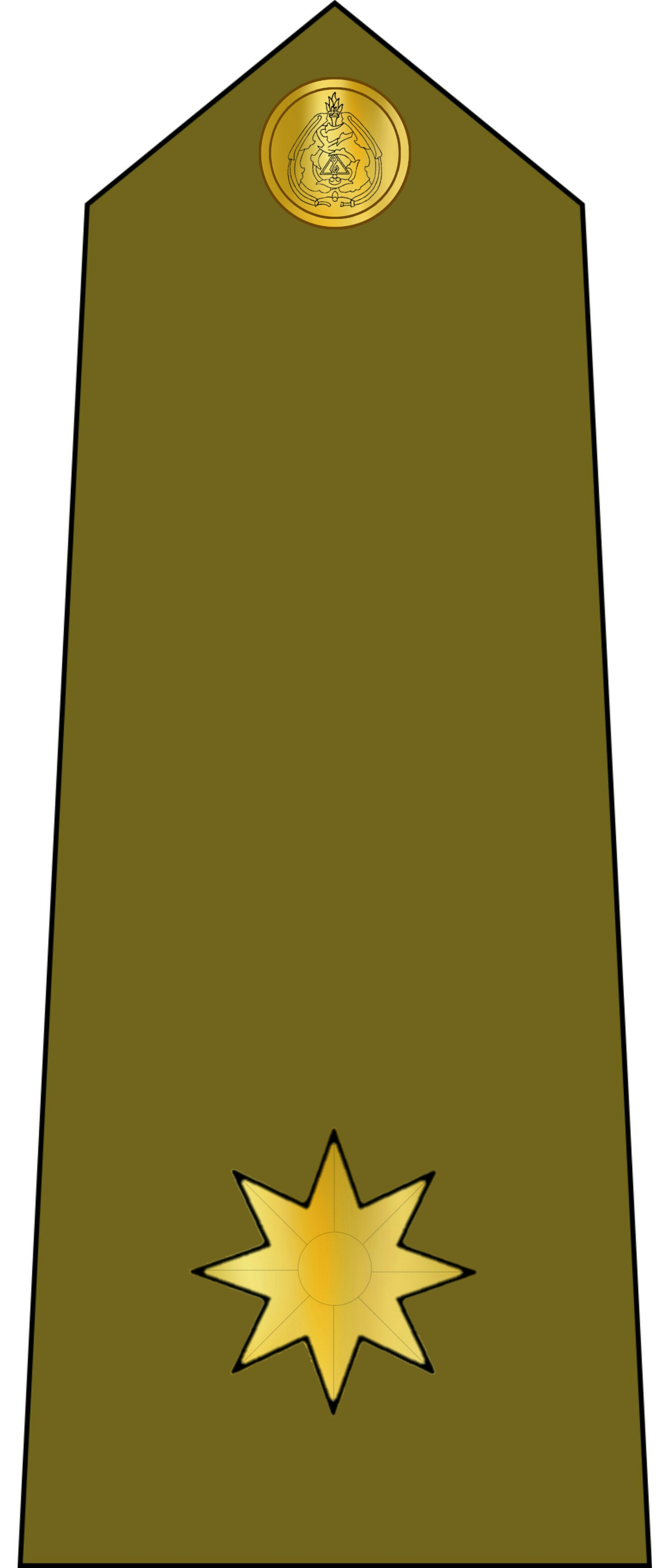
- Rank: Lieutenant
- Conflicts: 1959 Mosul uprising

Saeb Sabry al-Safi al-Arkoub (1936–1959) was one of the Iraqi pilots who participated in the Shawaf coup in 1959 against Prime Minister Abdul-Karim Qasim.

== Early life ==
Saeb Sabry al-Safi was born in 1936, He was the sixth of eleven children born to Sabri Ahmed Al-Safi (1900–1953 ) and his wife Marziya Muhammad Saleh Al-Masry (1904–1985 ).

== Shawaf coup ==
after 14 July Revolution, many parties in Iraq fought against each other, and that led to attempt coup d'état on 7 March 1959, known as the Mosul uprising. Al-Safi participated in that coup, his duty was to bomb Radio Baghdad station on March 8. The raid failed, with the planes doing little damage.

== Death by committing suicide ==
On his return to the airbase he realised that the coup had failed, so he attempted to flee to Syria. His plane however ran out of fuel and upon landing he committed suicide rather than being captured.
