= Ramadan Revolution =

1963 Ba'athist military coup in Iraq

- Part of the Cold War and the Arab Cold War
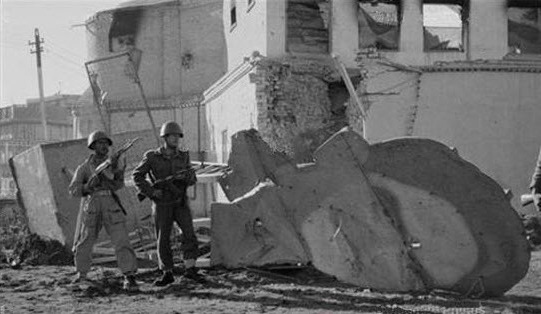
- Iraqi soldiers next to a sign with the image of Qasim taken down during the coup
Date	8–10 February 1963
Location	Iraq
Result	Iraqi Ba'athist victory: Overthrow of Abd al-Karim Qasim; Establishment of Ba'athist government

Belligerents
Iraqi Government; Iraqi Armed Forces (Loyalist elements); Iraqi Communist Party	Iraqi Ba'ath Party; Iraqi Armed Forces (Ba'athist elements); National Guard militia; Supported by: United States Nasserists; Supported by: United Arab Republic

Commanders and leaders
Abdul-Karim Qasim (executed); Fadhil al-Mahdawi (executed); Jalal al-Awqati X Muhammad Najib; Husain al-Radi (executed)	Ahmed Hassan al-Bakr; Ali Salih al-Sa'di; Salih Mahdi Ammash; Abdul Salam Arif

Casualties and losses
100 killed	80 killed
- 1,500–5,000 alleged civilian supporters of Qasim and/or the Iraqi Communist Party killed during a three day "house-to-house search"

The Ramadan Revolution, also referred to as the 8 February Revolution and the February 1963 coup d'état (Arabic: حركة 8 شباط) in Iraq, was a military coup by the Iraqi branch of the Ba'ath Party in February 1963 that overthrew the prime minister of Iraq, Abdul-Karim Qasim in favour of a Ba'athist government. The coup was followed nine months later by a counter coup that saw the removal of the new government and a purging of Ba'ath Party members.

The most powerful leader of the Ba'athist government that emerged from the coup was the secretary general of the Iraqi Ba'ath Party, Ali Salih al-Sa'di, who controlled the National Guard militia and organized a massacre of hundreds—if not thousands—of suspected communists and other dissidents following the coup. Qasim's former deputy, Abdul Salam Arif, who was not a Ba'athist, was given the largely ceremonial title of president, while prominent Ba'athist general Ahmed Hassan al-Bakr was named prime minister.

The government lasted approximately nine months, until Arif disarmed the National Guard in the November 1963 Iraqi coup d'état. This was followed by a purge of Ba'ath Party members.

== Background ==
Some time after the Nationalist Officers' Organization, or "Al-Ahrar" ("The Free") succeeded in toppling the monarchy and transforming the Iraqi government into a republic in 1958, signs of differences between political parties and forces and the Homeland Officers' Organization began when Pan-Arab nationalist forces led by Abdul Salam Arif and the Ba'ath Party called for immediate unification with the United Arab Republic (UAR). In an attempt to create a state of political equilibrium, the Iraqi Communist Party (ICP), which opposed unity, tried to discount cooperation with the UAR in economics, culture, and science rather than political and military agreements.

Gradually, Abdul-Karim Qasim's relations with some of his fellow members of Al-Ahrar worsened, and his relationship with the unionist and nationalist currents, which had played an active role in supporting the 1958 movement, became strained. As for conflicting currents in the ICP, they were aspiring for a coalition with General Qasim and had long been extending their relationship with him. Qasim thought that some of his allies in the Communist party were coming close to leapfrogging the proposition, especially after the increasing influence of the Communist party in the use of the slogan, proclaimed by many Communists and government supporters during marches: "Long live leader Abd al-Karim and the Communist Party in governing great demand!" Qasim began to minimize the Communist movement. He ordered the party to be disarmed and most of the party leaders to be arrested. However, the party retained Air Commander Jalal al-Awqati and Lt. Col. Fadhil Abbas Mahdawi, Qasim's cousin.

== Coup ==
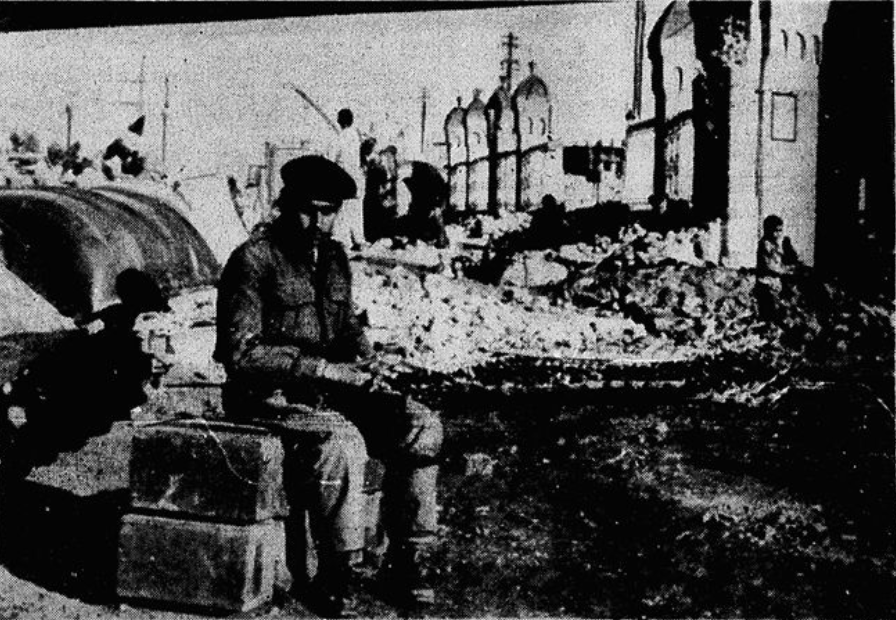
Soldier in the ruins of the Ministry of Defence, where Qasim made his last stand

Recording attached with texts of Abd Al-Karim Qasim's last speech.

Qasim's removal took place on 8 February 1963, the fourteenth day of Ramadan, and so the coup was called the 14 Ramadan Coup. It had been in its planning stages since 1962, and several attempts had been planned, only to be abandoned for fear of discovery. The coup had been initially planned for January 18, but was moved to 25 January and then 8 February after Qasim gained knowledge of the proposed attempt and arrested some of the plotters.

The coup began in the early morning of 8 February 1963, when the communist air force chief, Jalal al-Awqati, was assassinated, and tank units occupied the Abu Ghraib radio station. A bitter two-day struggle unfolded with heavy fighting between the Ba'athist conspirators and pro-Qasim forces. Qasim took refuge in the Ministry of Defence, where fighting became particularly heavy. Communist sympathisers took to the streets to resist the coup, which added to the high casualties: "An estimated eighty Ba'thists and between 300 and 5,000 communist sympathizers were killed in the two days of fighting to control Baghdad's streets," as recounted by Ariel Ira Ahram.

On 9 February, Qasim eventually offered his surrender in return for safe passage out of the country. His request was refused, and in the afternoon, he was executed on the orders of the newly formed National Council of the Revolutionary Command (NCRC). Qasim was given a mock trial over Baghdad radio and then killed. Many of his Shi'ite supporters believed that he had merely gone into hiding and would appear like the Mahdi to lead a rebellion against the new government. To counter that sentiment and to terrorize his supporters, Qasim's dead body was displayed on television in a five-minute propaganda video, The End of the Criminals, which included close-up views of his bullet wounds amid disrespectful treatment of his corpse, which is spat on in the final scene.

Qasim's former deputy, Abdul Salam Arif, who was not a Ba'athist, was given the largely ceremonial title of president, and the prominent Ba'athist general Ahmed Hassan al-Bakr was named prime minister. However, the secretary general of the Ba'ath Party, Ali Salih al-Sa'di, used his control of the National Guard militia, commanded by Mundhir al-Wanadawi, to establish himself as the de facto new leader of Iraq and had more authority in reality than al-Bakr or Arif. The nine-month rule of al-Sa'di and his civilian branch of the Ba'ath Party has been described as "a reign of terror" as the National Guard, under orders from the Revolutionary Command Council (RCC) "to annihilate anyone who disturbs the peace," detained, tortured, or executed thousands of suspected Qasim loyalists. Furthermore, the National Guard, which developed from a core group of perhaps 5,000 civilian Ba'athist partisans but increased to 34,000 members by August 1963, who were identified by their green armbands, was poorly disciplined, as militiamen engaged in extensive infighting and created a widespread perception of chaos and disorder.

== U.S. involvement ==
While it's still early, the Iraqi revolution seems to have succeeded. It is almost certainly a net gain for our side. ... We will make informal friendly noises as soon as we can find out whom to talk with, and ought to recognize as soon as we're sure these guys are firmly in the saddle. CIA had excellent reports on the plotting, but I doubt either they or UK should claim much credit for it.

— Robert Komer to President John F. Kennedy, February 8, 1963.

It has long been suspected that the Ba'ath Party collaborated with the CIA in planning and carrying out the coup. Pertinent contemporary documents relating to the CIA's operations in Iraq have remained classified and as of 2021, "[s]cholars are only beginning to uncover the extent to which the United States was involved in organizing the coup," but are "divided in their interpretations of American foreign policy." Bryan R. Gibson, writes that although "[i]t is accepted among scholars that the CIA ... assisted the Ba’th Party in its overthrow of [Qasim's] regime," that "barring the release of new information, the preponderance of evidence substantiates the conclusion that the CIA was not behind the February 1963 Ba'thist coup." Peter Hahn argues that "[d]eclassified U.S. government documents offer no evidence to support" suggestions of direct U.S. involvement. On the other hand, Brandon Wolfe-Hunnicutt writes that "CIA involvement in the 1963 coup ... has been an open secret for decades," citing "compelling evidence of an American role," and publicly declassified documents that "largely substantiate the plausibility" of the CIA's involvement. Eric Jacobsen, citing the testimony of contemporary prominent Ba'athists and U.S. government officials, states that "[t]here is ample evidence that the CIA not only had contacts with the Iraqi Ba'th in the early sixties, but also assisted in the planning of the coup." Nathan J. Citino writes that "Washington backed the movement by military officers linked to the pan-Arab Ba‘th Party that overthrew Qasim," but that "the extent of U.S. responsibility cannot be fully established on the basis of available documents," and that "[a]lthough the United States did not initiate the 14 Ramadan coup, at best it condoned and at worst it contributed to the violence that followed."

Ba'athist leaders maintained supportive relationships with U.S. officials before, during, and after the coup. A March 1964 State Department memorandum stated that U.S. "officers assiduously cultivated" a "Baathi student organization, which triggered the revolution of February 8, 1963 by sponsoring a successful student strike at the University of Baghdad." According to Wolfe-Hunnicutt, declassified documents suggest that the Kennedy administration viewed two prominent Ba'athist officials—Ba'ath Party Army Bureau head, Lt. Col. Salih Mahdi Ammash, whose arrest on February 4 served as the coup's catalyst, and Hazim Jawad, "responsible for [the Ba'ath Party's] clandestine printing and propaganda distribution operations"—as "assets." Ammash was described as "Western-oriented, anti-British, and anti-Communist," and known to be "friendly to the service attaches of the US Embassy in Baghdad," while future U.S. ambassador to Iraq, Robert C. Strong, would refer to Jawad as "one of our boys." Jamal al-Atassi—a cabinet member of the Ba'athist regime that took power in Syria that same year—would tell Malik Mufti that the Iraqi Ba'athists, in conversations with their Syrian counterparts, argued "that their cooperation with the CIA and the US to overthrow Abd al-Karim Qasim and take over power" was comparable "to how Lenin arrived in a German train to carry out his revolution, saying they had arrived in an American train." Similarly, then secretary general of the Iraqi Ba'ath Party, Ali Salih al-Sa'di, is quoted as saying that the Iraqi Ba'athists "came to power on a CIA train." Former U.S. ambassador to Saudi Arabia, James E. Akins, who worked in the Baghdad Embassy's political section from 1961 to 1964, would state that he personally witnessed contacts between Ba'ath Party members and CIA officials, and that:

The [1963 Ba'athist] revolution was of course supported by the U.S. in money and equipment as well. I don't think the equipment was terribly important, but the money was to the Ba'ath Party leaders who took over the revolution. It wasn't talked about openly—that we were behind it—but an awful lot of people knew.

Conversely, according to Gibson, the CIA official working to instigate a military coup against Qasim, and who later became the head of the CIA's operations in Iraq and Syria, has "denied any involvement in the Ba'ath Party's actions," stating instead that the CIA's efforts against Qasim were still in the planning stages at the time: "I was still engaged in contacting people who could play a role in a coup attempt against [him]."

U.S. officials were undoubtedly pleased with the coup's outcome, ultimately approving a $55 million arms deal with Iraq and urging America's Arab allies to oppose a Soviet-sponsored diplomatic offensive accusing Iraq of genocide against its Kurdish minority at the United Nations (UN) General Assembly. In its ascension to power, the Ba'athists "methodically hunted down Communists" thanks to "mimeographed lists [...] complete with home addresses and auto license plate numbers." While it is unlikely that the Ba'athists would've needed assistance in identifying Iraqi communists, it is widely believed that the CIA provided the National Guard with lists of communists and other leftists, who were then arrested or killed under al-Wanadawi's and al-Sa'di's direction. This claim first originated in a September 27, 1963 Al-Ahram interview with King Hussein of Jordan, who declared:

You tell me that American Intelligence was behind the 1957 events in Jordan. Permit me to tell you that I know for a certainty that what happened in Iraq on 8 February had the support of American Intelligence. Some of those who now rule in Baghdad do not know of this thing but I am aware of the truth. Numerous meetings were held between the Ba'ath party and American Intelligence, the more important in Kuwait. Do you know that ... on 8 February a secret radio beamed to Iraq was supplying the men who pulled the coup with the names and addresses of the Communists there so that they could be arrested and executed? ... Yet I am the one accused of being an agent of America and imperialism!

Similarly, Qasim's former foreign minister, Hashim Jawad, would state that "the Iraqi Foreign Ministry had information of complicity between the Ba'ath and the CIA. In many cases the CIA supplied the Ba'ath with the names of individual communists, some of whom were taken from their homes and murdered." Gibson emphasizes that the Ba'athists compiled their own lists, citing Bureau of Intelligence and Research reports stating that "[Communist] party members [are being] rounded up on the basis of lists prepared by the now-dominant Ba'th Party" and that the ICP had "exposed virtually all its assets" whom the Ba'athists had "carefully spotted and listed." On the other hand, Wolfe-Hunnicutt, citing contemporary U.S. counterinsurgency doctrine, notes that assertions of CIA involvement in the Ba'athist purge campaign "would be consistent with American special warfare doctrine" regarding U.S. covert support to anti-communist "Hunter-Killer" teams "seeking the violent overthrow of a communist dominated and supported government," and "speaks to a larger pattern in American foreign policy," drawing parallels to other instances where the CIA compiled lists of suspected communists targeted for execution, such as Guatemala in 1954 and Indonesia in 1965-66. Also, Citino and Wolfe-Hunnicutt note that two officials in the U.S. embassy in Baghdad—William Lakeland and James E. Akins—"used coverage of the July 1962 Moscow Conference for Disarmament and Peace in Iraq's leftist press to compile lists of Iraqi communists and their supporters ... Those listed included merchants, students, members of professional societies, and journalists, although university professors constituted the largest single group." Wolfe-Hunnicutt comments that "it’s not unreasonable to suspect [such a] list – or ones like it – would have been shared with the Ba‘ath." Lakeland, a former SCI participant, "personally maintained contact following the coup with a National Guard interrogator," and may have been influenced by his prior interaction with then-Major Hasan Mustafa al-Naqib, the Iraqi military attaché in the U.S. who defected to the Ba'ath Party after Qasim "upheld Mahdawi's death sentences" against nationalists involved in the 1959 Mosul uprising. Furthermore, "Weldon C. Mathews has meticulously established that National Guard leaders who participated in human rights abuses had been trained in the United States as part of a police program run by the International Cooperation Administration and Agency for International Development."

The attacks on the people's freedoms carried out by the ... bloodthirsty members of the National Guard, their violation of things sacred, their disregard of the law, the injuries they have done to the state and the people, and finally their armed rebellion on November 13, 1963, has led to an intolerable situation which is fraught with grave dangers to the future of this people which is an integral part of the Arab nation. We have endured all we could. ... The army has answered the call of the people to rid them from this terror.

— President Abdul Salam Arif, 1963.

The U.S. provided $120,000 in "police assistance" to Iraq during 1963–1965, considerably less than the $832,000 in assistance that it provided to Iran during those years.

=== Soviet tank scandal ===
The Kennedy administration officially advocated a diplomatic settlement to the First Iraqi–Kurdish War, but its provision of military aid to the Ba'athist government emboldened Iraqi hardliners to resume hostilities against Kurdish rebels on June 10, after which Iraq requested additional emergency U.S. assistance including napalm weapons. President Kennedy approved the arms sale in part on the recommendation of senior adviser Robert Komer and the weapons were provided, but an offer by Iraqi general Hasan Sabri al-Bayati to reciprocate this gesture by sending a Soviet T-54 tank in Iraq's possession to the U.S. embassy in Baghdad for inspection became a scandal as Bayati's offer had not been approved by al-Bakr, Foreign Minister Talib El-Shibib, or other senior Iraqi officials. Ultimately, the Ba'ath Party leadership reneged on that part of the agreement, fearing that handing over the tank to the U.S. would irrevocably harm Iraq's reputation. Shibib subsequently recounted that the incident damaged Iraq's relations with both the U.S. and the Soviet Union: "On the one side Iraq would lose the Soviets as a source of intelligence. On the other the United States would see us as a bunch of kid swindlers."

== Soviet reaction ==
Throughout 1963, the Soviet Union actively worked to undermine the Ba'athist government, supporting Kurdish rebels under the leadership of Mustafa Barzani with propaganda and a "small monthly stipend for Barzani," suspending military shipments to Iraq in May, convincing its ally Mongolia to make charges of genocide against Iraq at the UN General Assembly from July to September, and sponsoring a failed communist coup attempt on July 3.

== Influence on Syria ==
The same year, the party's military committee in Syria succeeded in persuading Nasserist and independent officers to make common cause with it and successfully carried out a military coup on 8 March. A National Revolutionary Command Council took control, assigned itself legislative power, and appointed Salah al-Din al-Bitar as head of a "national front" government. The Ba'ath participated in the government, along with the Arab Nationalist Movement, the United Arab Front, and the Socialist Unity Movement.

As Hanna Batatu notes, that took place without the fundamental disagreement over immediate or "considered" reunification having been resolved. The Ba'ath moved to consolidate its power within the new government by purging Nasserist officers in April. Subsequent disturbances led to the fall of the al-Bitar government, and in the aftermath of Jassem Alwan’s failed Nasserist coup in July, the Ba'ath monopolized power.

== Aftermath ==
The attacks on the people's freedoms carried out by the ... bloodthirsty members of the National Guard, their violation of things sacred, their disregard of the law, the injuries they have done to the state and the people, and finally their armed rebellion on November 13, 1963, has led to an intolerable situation which is fraught with grave dangers to the future of this people which is an integral part of the Arab nation. We have endured all we could. ... The army has answered the call of the people to rid them from this terror.

— President Abdul Salam Arif, 1963.

The Ba'athist government collapsed in November 1963 over the question of unification with Syria and the extremist and uncontrollable behavior of al-Sa'di's National Guard. President Arif, with the overwhelming support of the Iraqi military, purged Ba'athists from the government and ordered the National Guard to stand down and disarm. Although al-Bakr had conspired with Arif to remove al-Sa'di, on 5 January 1964, Arif removed al-Bakr from his new position as vice president for fear of allowing the Ba'ath Party to retain a foothold inside his government.

After the November coup, mounting evidence of Ba'athist atrocities emerged, which Lakeland predicted "will have a more or less permanent effect on the political developments in the country—particularly on the prospects of a Ba'athi revival." Marion Farouk-Sluglett and Peter Sluglett describe the Ba'athists as having cultivated a "profoundly unsavory image" by "acts of wanton brutality" on a scale without prior precedent in Iraq, including "some of the most terrible scenes of violence hitherto experienced in the postwar Middle East." "As almost every family in Baghdad was affected—and both men and women were equally maltreated—the Ba'athists' activities aroused a degree of intense loathing for them that has persisted to this day among many Iraqis of that generation." More broadly, the Slugletts state, "Qasim's failings, serious as they were, can scarcely be discussed in the same terms as the venality, savagery and wanton brutality characteristic of the regimes which followed his own." Batatu recounts:

In the cellars of al-Nihayyah Palace, which the [National Guard's] Bureau [of Special Investigation] used as its headquarters, were found all sorts of loathsome instruments of torture, including electric wires with pincers, pointed iron stakes on which prisoners were made to sit, and a machine which still bore traces of chopped-off fingers. Small heaps of blooded clothing were scattered about, and there were pools on the floor and stains over the walls.

== See also ==
- 1959 Mosul uprising
- 17 July Revolution

== Sources ==
- Gibson, Bryan R. (2015). Sold Out? US Foreign Policy, Iraq, the Kurds, and the Cold War. Palgrave Macmillan. ISBN 978-1-137-48711-7.
- Citino, Nathan J. (2017). "The People's Court". Envisioning the Arab Future: Modernization in US-Arab Relations, 1945–1967. Cambridge University Press. ISBN 9781108107556.
