= Muhammad Najib ar-Ruba'i =

President of Iraq from 1958 to 1963

His Excellency Muhammad Najib ar-Ruba'i
- مُحَمَّد نَجِيب الرَّبِيعِيّ
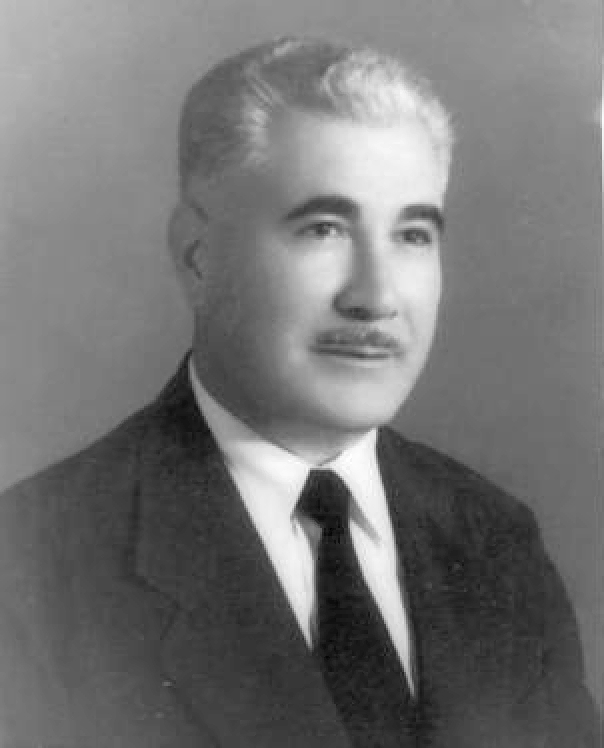
- Al-Rubaiy in 1960

1st President of Iraq
- In office 14 July 1958 – 8 February 1963
- Prime Minister: Abd al-Karim Qasim
- Preceded by: Faisal II (as the King of Iraq)
- Succeeded by: Abdul Salam Arif

Chairman of the Sovereignty Council of Iraq
- In office 14 July 1958 – 8 February 1963
- Preceded by: Office established
- Succeeded by: Office abolished Abdul Salam Arif (as Chairman of the National Council for the Leadership of the Revolution)

Personal details
- Born: 14 July 1904 Baghdad, Baghdad Vilayet, Ottoman Empire
- Died: 1965 (aged 60–61) Baghdad, Iraq
- Party: Independent politician
- Occupation: Politician, President of Iraq (1958–63) and Chairman of the Sovereignty Council of Iraq (1958–1963)
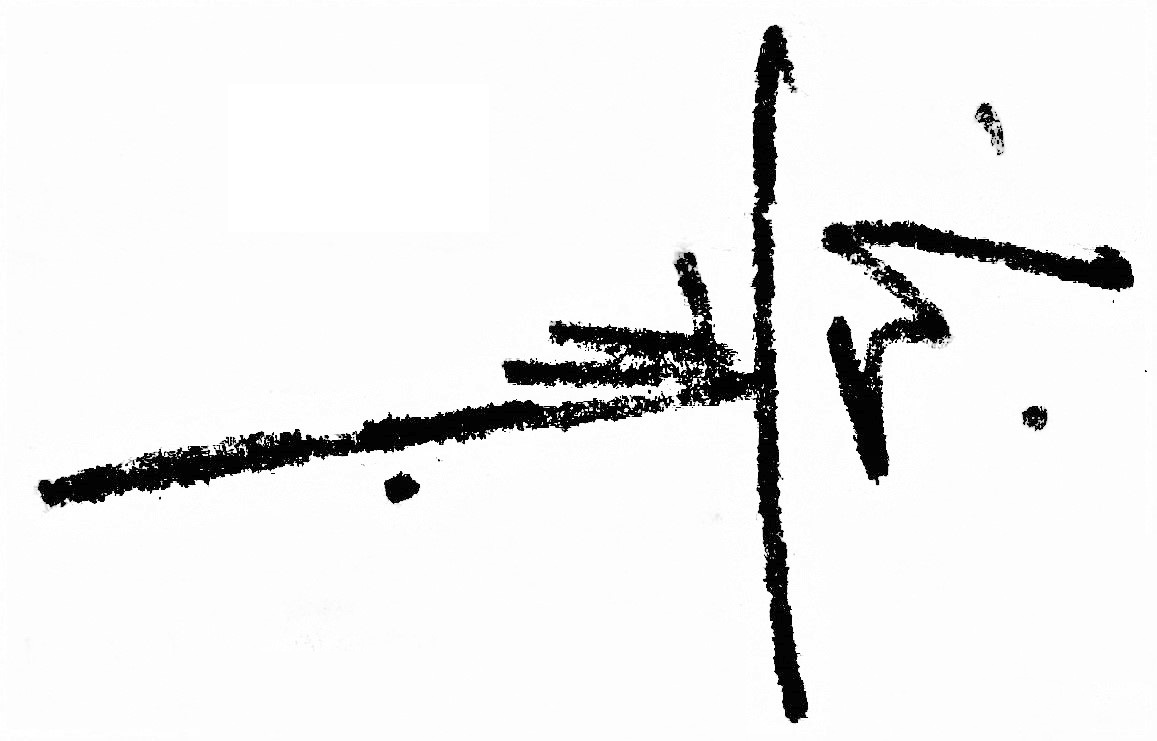
- Signature

Military service
- Allegiance: Mandatory Iraq (1924–1932); Kingdom of Iraq (1932–1958); Iraqi Republic (1958–1963)
- Branch/service: Iraqi Ground Forces
- Years of service: 1924–1963
- Rank: Lieutenant General
- Battles/wars: Mahmud Barzanji revolts; Ahmed Barzani revolt; 1935–1936 Iraqi Shia revolts; Second World War; Middle Eastern theatre; Anglo-Iraqi War; 1943 Barzani revolt; First Arab-Israeli War; First Iraqi-Kurdish War

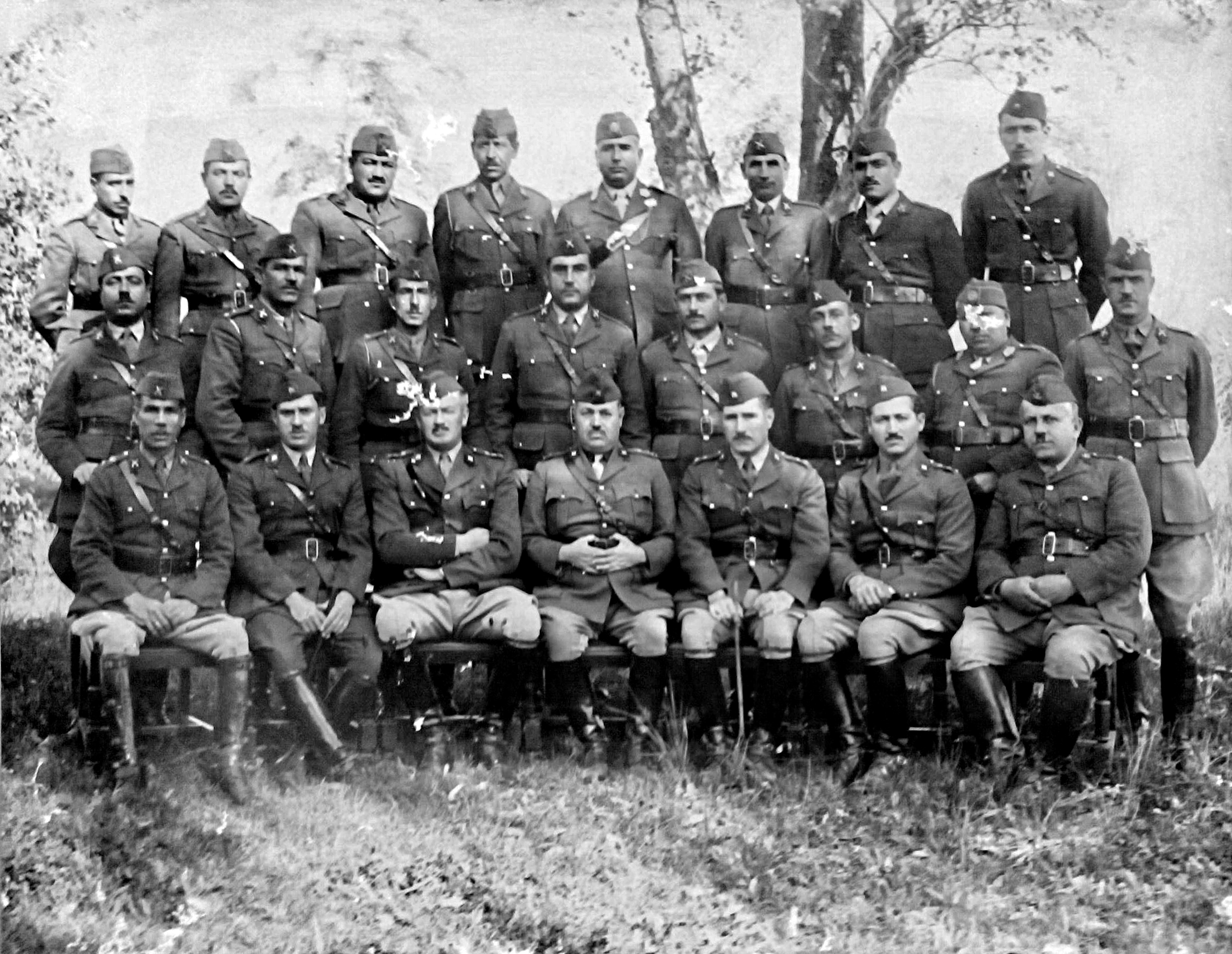
At the Military Staff College in Iraq, 1942. Ar-Ruba'i is the third officer seated below, from the right.

Muhammad Najib ar-Ruba'i (Arabic: مُحَمَّد نَجِيب الرَّبِيعِيّ; also spelled Al-Rubaiy; 1904–1965) was an Iraqi military officer and politician who served as the first president of Iraq, from 14 July 1958 to 8 February 1963. Together with Abdul Karim Qasim, he was one of the leaders of the 14 July Revolution that toppled King Faisal II and the Hashemite Iraqi monarchy in 1958.

While Qasim became prime minister and held most of the power, Ar-Ruba'i was elected head of state with the title of Chairman of the Sovereignty Council. The Sovereignty Council had a representative from each of the communal/ethnic groups. Ar-Ruba'i represented the Sunni community.

In 1963, Qasim was deposed in the Ramadan Revolution. This led Ar-Ruba'i to retire from politics, and he eventually died in 1965.

Preceded by Faisal II (as King of Iraq)	President of Iraq; 14 July 1958 – 8 February 1963	Succeeded by Abd as-Salam Arif
