= 1959 Mosul uprising =

Attempted coup in Iraq

1959 Mosul Uprising
- Part of the Arab Cold War and Aftermath of the 14 July Revolution
Date	7–11 March 1959
Location	Mosul, Iraq
Result	Attempted coup fails: Iraq remains outside of the UAR; Degradation in Iraq-UAR relations; Iraqi Communists increase in power; Iraqi Ba'athists begin to increase in strength

Belligerents
(Iraq) Iraqi Government; Communist Party; Arab, Kurdish, and Assyrian peasants; Kurdistan Democratic Party	Arab nationalists; Ba'ath Party; (Arab Revolt) Sympathetic Arab tribes Supported by: United Arab Republic; United States; CIA (alleged)

Commanders and leaders
(Iraq) Abdul-Karim Qasim; Mustafa Barzani; Kamil Kazanchi †	Abdul Wahab al-Shawaf †; Saddam Hussein (WIA) (Arab Revolt) Ahmed Ajil †

Casualties and losses
- 2,426

The 1959 Mosul Uprising started with an attempted coup by Arab nationalists in Mosul who wished to depose the then Iraqi Prime Minister Abdul-Karim Qasim, and install an Arab nationalist government which would then join the Republic of Iraq with the United Arab Republic. Following the failure of the coup, law and order broke down in Mosul, which witnessed several days of violent street battles between various groups attempting to use the chaos to settle political and personal scores.

== Background ==
During Qasim's term, there was much debate over whether Iraq should join the United Arab Republic, led by Egyptian president Gamal Abdel Nasser. Jordan had dissolved the Arab Federation after Qasim overthrew the monarchy in Iraq and had the entire royal family in Iraq executed, along with Prime Minister Nuri al-Said.

Qasim's growing ties with the Iraqi Communist Party (ICP) provoked a rebellion in the northern Iraqi city of Mosul which was led by Arab nationalists in charge of military units. In an attempt to intimidate any individuals plotting a potential coup, Qasim had encouraged a Communist backed Peace Partisans rally in Mosul that was held on 6 March 1959. Some 250,000 Peace Partisans and Communists thronged Mosul's streets on 6 March, and although the rally passed peacefully, by 7 March, skirmishes had broken out between the Communists and the nationalists. This degenerated into a civil war-like situation over the following days.

== Coup attempt ==
Qasim's attempt to stop dissent was successful to some extent, as Colonel Abdul Wahab Shawaf, the 40-year-old Arab nationalist Commander of the Iraqi Army's Mosul Garrison, was discomforted by the Communists' show of force. Following clashes between the Communist Party's Popular Resistance Militia and Nasserite partisans in Mosul which culminated in the burning down of a Nasserite restaurant, Shawaf phoned Baghdad to ask for permission to use the soldiers under his command to keep order.

Shawaf was given an ambiguous response by Baghdad. Therefore, Shawaf decided to try and carry out a coup d'état on 7 March. Shawaf was supported in this endeavour by other disgruntled Free Officers, who were primarily from prominent Arab Sunni families and who opposed Qasim's growing relationship with the ICP. Shawaf ordered the Iraqi Army's 5th brigade, which was under his command, to round up 300 members of the Communist Peace Partisans, including their leader, Kamil Kazanchi, a well known Baghdad lawyer and politician, who was executed.

Shawaf sent word to other commanders of the northern garrison in an effort to convince them to join his attempted coup. He kidnapped a British technician and portable radio transmitter from the Iraq Petroleum Company and took over Radio Mosul, which he attempted to use to encourage Iraqis to rise up against Qasim. Shawaf also sent word to sympathetic local tribesmen, including the Shammar, of whom thousands then travelled to Mosul to show their support.

On the morning of 8 March, Shawaf sent two Hawker Sea Fury fighter aircraft to Baghdad on an aerial bombing raid. The crew of the aircraft had been ordered to bomb the headquarters of Radio Baghdad. However, the raid was a failure, with the planes doing little damage, and of the two pilots who bombed the capital, one was arrested and the other pilot, Saeb Sabry al-Safi, attempted to flee to Syria but he landed on Iraqi territory and committed suicide. In response, Qasim sent four Iraqi Air Force planes to attack Shawaf's headquarters, situated on a bluff above Mosul. The attack on the headquarters killed six or seven officers and wounded Shawaf. Whilst Shawaf was bandaging himself, he was killed by one of his sergeants who believed the coup had failed.

== Ensuing violence ==
Although Shawaf was dead, the violence was not yet over. Mosul soon became a scene of score settling between rebel and loyalist soldiers, alongside Communists and Arab nationalists. Bedouin tribesmen who had been called on by Shawaf prior to his death to support the coup also engaged in pillaging, and the violence within Mosul was also used as a cover by some to settle private scores. Shawaf's body was beaten and dragged through the streets of Mosul before being thrown in a car and taken to Baghdad.

Three pro-government Kurdish tribes moved into Mosul and fought the Arab Shammar tribesmen, their long time opponents who had rallied around Shawaf. Sheik Ahmed Ajil, the chief of the Shammars was spotted by Kurdish militiamen in his car and was killed, along with his driver, and both were later hung naked from a bridge over the Tigris. By the fourth day government troops had begun to impose order and began clearing the roads as well as removing naked and mutilated bodies which had been strung up from lamp posts. The total dead was estimated at 500.

Around the same time, ICP members violently attacked alleged "reactionaries" in Basra.

== Aftermath ==
Although the rebellion was crushed by the military, it had a number of adverse effects that was to affect Qasim's position. First, it increased the power of the communists. Second, it encouraged the ideas of the Ba'ath Party's (which had been steadily growing since the 14 July coup). The Ba'ath Party believed that the only way of halting the engulfing tide of communism was to assassinate Qasim.

The growing influence of communism was felt throughout 1959. A communist-sponsored purge of the armed forces was carried out in the wake of the Mosul revolt. The Iraqi cabinet began to shift towards the radical-left as several communist sympathisers gained posts in the cabinet. Iraq's foreign policy began to reflect this communist influence, as Qasim removed Iraq from the Baghdad Pact on 24 March, and later fostered closer ties with the USSR, including extensive economic agreements. However communist successes encouraged attempts to expand on their position. The communists attempted to replicate their success at Mosul in similar fashion at Kirkuk. A rally was called for 14 July. This was intended to intimidate conservative elements. Instead, it resulted in widespread bloodshed. Qasim consequently cooled relations with the communists signalling a reduction (although by no means a cessation) of their influence in the Iraqi government.

Qasim and his supporters accused the UAR of having supported the rebels, and the uprising resulted in an intensification of the ongoing Iraq-UAR propaganda war, with the UAR press accusing Qasim of having sold out the ideas of Arab nationalism. The disagreements between Qasim and Cairo also highlighted the fact that the UAR had failed to become the single voice of Arab nationalism, and the UAR had to recognize that many Iraqis were unwilling to recognise Cairo's leadership, thereby revealing the limits of Nasser's power to other Arab governments.

== Extent of UAR involvement ==
Although the attempted coup may have been driven in part by Arab nationalist sentiment and a desire to join the United Arab Republic, the exact extent of UAR involvement in the coup has largely been unclear. Shawaf kept in close contact with the UAR during the development of the attempted coup, with some claiming that the UAR ambassador in Baghdad acted as an intermediary between the UAR and the rebels. There is also evidence that suggests that Radio Mosul may have been transmitting from the Syrian side of the border.

== Sources ==
- McDowall, David (2005). A Modern History of the Kurds (3rd ed.). London: I.B. Tauris. ISBN 978-1-85043-416-0.
