= Abdul-Karim Qasim =

Prime Minister of Iraq from 1958 to 1963

- عبد الكريم قاسم
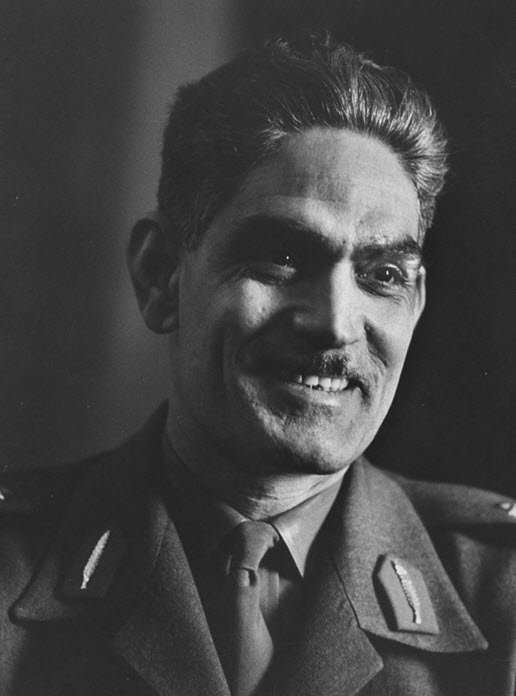
- Qasim in 1961

Prime Minister of Iraq
- In office 14 July 1958 – 8 February 1963
- President: Muhammad Najib ar-Ruba'i
- Preceded by: Ahmad Mukhtar Baban
- Succeeded by: Ahmed Hassan al-Bakr

Defense Minister of Iraq
- In office 14 July 1958 – 8 February 1963
- Preceded by: Nuri al-Said
- Succeeded by: Saleh Mahdi Amassi

Commander-in-Chief of the Iraqi Armed Forces
- In office 14 July 1958 – 8 February 1963
- Preceded by: King Faisal II
- Succeeded by: Abdul Salam Arif

Personal details
- Born: 21 November 1914 Baghdad, Ottoman Iraq
- Died: 9 February 1963 (aged 48) Baghdad, Iraq
- Cause of death: Execution by firing squad
- Party: Independent (Note: Supported by the National Democratic Party and Iraqi Communist Party.)

Military service
- Allegiance: Kingdom of Iraq (1934–1958); Iraqi Republic (1958–1963)
- Branch/service: Iraqi Ground Forces
- Years of service: 1934–1963
- Rank: Major General
- Battles/wars: 1935–1936 Iraqi Shia revolts; Second World War; Middle Eastern theatre; Anglo-Iraqi War; 1943 Barzani revolt; First Arab-Israeli War; First Iraqi–Kurdish War

Abdul Karim Qasim Mohammed Bakr Al-Qaraghuli Al-Zubaidi (Arabic: عبد الكريم قاسم ʿAbd al-Karīm Qāsim [ʕabdulkariːm qɑːsɪm]; 21 November 1914 – 9 February 1963) was an Iraqi military officer and statesman who served as the Prime Minister and de facto leader of Iraq from 1958 until his overthrow in 1963.

Qasim came to power in 1958 when the Iraqi monarchy was overthrown during the 14 July Revolution. He ruled the country as the prime minister until his downfall and execution during the 1963 Ramadan Revolution. He led a military regime in Iraq. Relations with Iran and the West deteriorated significantly under Qasim's leadership. He actively opposed the presence of foreign troops in Iraq and spoke out against it. Relations with Iran were strained due to his call for Arab territory within Iran to be annexed to Iraq, and Iran continued to actively fund and facilitate Kurdish rebels in the north of Iraq. Relations with the Pan-Arab Nasserist factions such as the Arab Struggle Party caused tensions with the United Arab Republic, and as a result it aided Kurdish rebellions in the Kurdistan Region against the government.

During his rule, Qasim was popularly known as az-Zaʿīm (الزعيم), or "The Leader".

== Early life and career ==
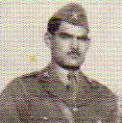
Qasim in 1937

Abd al-Karim's father, Qasim Mohammed Bakr Al-Qaraghuli Al-Zubaidi was a farmer from southern Baghdad who died during the First World War, shortly after his son's birth. Qasim's mother, Kayfia Hassan Yakub Al-Sakini was also from Baghdad. Abd al-Karim Qasim claimed to be of full Arab descent, with official data published during his rule claiming he was born to a Qahtani father and an Adnani mother. However, his opponents often denied his Arab origins and accused him of having a Turkmen father and a Kurdish mother, while other sources claimed his father was a Sunni Arab and his mother was a Shia Kurd. He was described as being "in a class of his own".

Qasim was born in Mahdiyya, a lower-income district of Baghdad on the left side of the river, now known as Karkh, on 21 November 1914, the youngest of three sons. When Qasim was six, his family moved to Al-Suwaira, a small town near the Tigris, then to Baghdad in 1926. Qasim was an excellent student and entered secondary school on a government scholarship. After graduation in 1931, he attended Shamiyya Elementary School from 22 October 1931 until 3 September 1932, when he was accepted into Military College. In 1934, he graduated as a second lieutenant. Qasim then attended al-Arkan (Iraqi Staff) College and graduated with honours (grade A) in December 1941. Militarily, he participated in the suppression of the tribal uprisings in central and southern Iraq in 1935, the 1941 Anglo-Iraqi War and the Barzani revolt in 1945. Qasim also served during the Iraqi military involvement in the 1948 Arab-Israeli War from May 1948 to June 1949. In 1951, he completed a senior officers’ course in Devizes, Wiltshire. Qasim was nicknamed "the snake charmer" by his classmates in Devizes because of his ability to persuade them to undertake improbable courses of action during military exercises.

In the “July 14 Revolution” of 1958, he was one of the leaders of the “Free Officers” who overthrew King Faisal II and ended the monarchy in Iraq. The king, much of his family and members of his government were murdered. The reason for the fall of the monarchy was its policies, which were viewed as one-sidedly pro-Western (pro-British) and anti-Arab, which, among other things, were reflected in the Baghdad Pact with the former occupying power Great Britain (1955) and in the founding of the “Arab Federation” with the kingdom Jordan (March 1958). The government also wanted to send the army to suppress anti-monarchist protests in Jordan, which sparked the rebellion. Shortly after the revolution, officers rioted against Qasim in Mosul and Kirkuk. Both uprisings were suppressed with the help of the Iraqi communists and Kurds.

Toward the latter part of that mission, he commanded a battalion of the First Brigade, which was situated in the Kafr Qassem area south of Qilqilya. In 1956–57, he served with his brigade at Mafraq in Jordan in the wake of the Suez Crisis. By 1957 Qasim had assumed leadership of several opposition groups that had formed in the army.

== 14 July Revolution ==
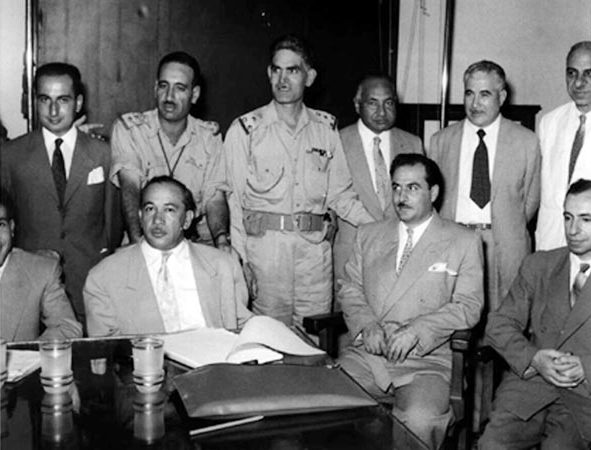
Qasim (back row, left of centre) and other leaders of the revolution, including Abdul Salam Arif (back row, second from left) and Muhammad Najib ar-Ruba'i (back row, fifth from left). Also included is Ba'athist ideologue Michel Aflaq (front row, first from right).

On 14 July 1958, Qasim used troop movements planned by the government as an opportunity to seize military control of Baghdad and overthrow the monarchy. The king, several members of the royal family, and their close associates, including Prime Minister Nuri as-Said, were executed.

The coup was discussed and planned by the Nationalist Officers' Organization, which although inspired by the Egypt's Free Officers movement, was not as advanced or cohesive. From as early as 1952 this Movement was led by Qasim and Colonel Isma'il Arif, before being joined later by an infantry officer serving under Qasim who would later go on to be his closest collaborator, Colonel Abdul Salam Arif. By the time of the coup in 1958, the total number of agents operating on behalf of the Free Officers had risen to around 150 who were all planted as informants or go-betweens in most units and depots of the army.

The coup was triggered when King Hussein of Jordan, fearing that an anti-Western revolt in Lebanon might spread to Jordan, requested Iraqi assistance. Instead of moving towards Jordan, however, Colonel Arif led a battalion into Baghdad and immediately proclaimed a new republic and the end of the old regime.

King Faisal II ordered the Royal Guard to offer no resistance, and surrendered to the coup forces. Around 8 am, Captain Abdul Sattar Sabaa Al-Ibousi, leading the revolutionary assault group at the Rihab Palace, which was still the principal royal residence in central Baghdad, ordered the King, Crown Prince 'Abd al-Ilah, Crown Princess Hiyam ('Abd al-Ilah's wife), Princess Nafeesa ('Abd al-Ilah's mother), Princess Abadiya (Faisal's aunt) and several servants to gather in the palace courtyard (the young King having not yet moved into the newly completed Royal Palace). When they all arrived in the courtyard they were told to turn towards the palace wall. All were then shot by Captain Abdus Sattar As Sab', a member of the coup led by Qasim.

In the wake of the brutal coup, the new Iraqi Republic was proclaimed and headed by a Revolutionary Military Council. At its head was a three-man Sovereignty Council, composed of members of Iraq's three main communal/ethnic groups. Muhammad Mahdi Kubbah represented the Arab Shia population, Khalid al-Naqshabandi the Kurds, and Muhammad Najib ar-Ruba'i the Arab Sunni population. This tripartite Council was to assume the role of the Presidency. A cabinet was created, composed of a broad spectrum of Iraqi political movements, including two National Democratic Party representatives, one member of al-Istiqlal, one Ba'ath Party representative and one Marxist.

After seizing power, Qasim assumed the post of Prime Minister and Defence Minister, while Colonel Arif was selected as Deputy Prime Minister and Interior Minister. They became the highest authority in Iraq with both executive and legislative powers. Muhammad Najib ar-Ruba'i became Chairman of the Sovereignty Council (head of state), but his power was very limited.

On 26 July 1958, the Interim Constitution was adopted, pending a permanent law to be promulgated after a free referendum. According to the document, Iraq was to be a republic and a part of the Arab nation while the official state religion was listed as Islam. Powers of legislation were vested in the Council of Ministers, with the approval of the Sovereignty Council, whilst executive function was also vested in the Council of Ministers.

== Prime minister ==
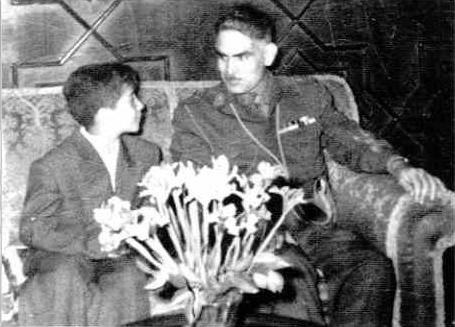
Qasim with future president of Kurdistan Region, Massoud Barzani

The flag of Iraq from 1959 to 1963, whose symbolism was associated with Qasim's government

Qasim assumed office after being elected as Prime Minister shortly after the coup in July 1958. He held this position until he was overthrown in February 1963.

Despite the encouraging tones of the temporary constitution, the new government descended into autocracy with Qasim at its head. The genesis of his elevation to "Sole Leader" began with a schism between Qasim and his fellow conspirator Arif. Despite one of the major goals of the revolution being to join the pan-Arabism movement and practise qawmiyah (Arab nationalism) policies, once in power Qasim soon modified his views to what is known today as Qasimism. Qasim, reluctant to tie himself too closely to Nasser's Egypt, sided with various groups within Iraq, notably the social democrats, that told him such an action would be dangerous. Instead he found himself echoing the views of his predecessor, Said, by adopting a wataniyah policy of "Iraq First". This caused a divide in the Iraqi government between the Iraqi nationalist Qasim, who wanted Iraq's identity to be secular and civic nationalist, revolving around Mesopotamian identity, and the Arab nationalists who sought an Arab identity for Iraq and closer ties to the rest of the Arab world.

The Iraqi state emblem under Qasim was mostly based on the sun disk symbol of Shamash, and carefully avoided pan-Arab symbolism by incorporating elements of Socialist heraldry.

Unlike the bulk of military officers, Qasim did not come from the Arab Sunni north-western towns, nor did he share their enthusiasm for pan-Arabism: he was of mixed Sunni-Shia parentage from south-eastern Iraq. His ability to remain in power depended, therefore, on a skillful balancing of the communists and the pan-Arabists. For most of his tenure, Qasim sought to balance the growing pan-Arab trend in the military.

He lifted a ban on the Iraqi Communist Party, and demanded the annexation of Kuwait. He was also involved in the 1958 Agrarian Reform, modelled after the Egyptian experiment of 1952.

Qasim was said by his admirers to have worked to improve the position of ordinary people in Iraq after a long period of self-interested rule by a small elite under the monarchy which had resulted in widespread social unrest. Qasim passed law No. 80, which seized 99% of Iraqi land from the British-owned Iraq Petroleum Company and distributed farms to more of the population. This increased the size of the middle class. He also oversaw the building of 35,000 residential units to house the poor and lower middle classes. The most notable example of this was the new suburb of Baghdad named Madinat al-Thawra (Revolution City), renamed Saddam City under the Ba'ath regime and now widely referred to as Sadr City. He also rewrote the constitution to encourage women's participation in society.

Qasim tried to maintain the political balance by using the traditional opponents of pan-Arabs, the right wing and nationalists. Up until the war with the Kurdish factions in the north, he was able to maintain the loyalty of the army.

He appointed as a minister Naziha al-Dulaimi, the first woman minister in the history of Iraq and the Arab world. She also participated in the drafting of the 1959 Civil Affairs Law, which was far ahead of its time in liberalising marriage and inheritance laws for the benefit of Iraqi women.

=== Power struggles ===
Despite a shared military background, the group of Free Officers that carried out 14 July Revolution was plagued by internal dissension. Its members lacked both a coherent ideology and an effective organisational structure. Many of the more senior officers resented having to take orders from Arif, their junior in rank. A power struggle developed between Qasim and Arif over joining the Egyptian-Syrian union. Arif's pro-Nasserite sympathies were supported by the Ba'ath Party, while Qasim found support for his anti-unification position in the ranks of the Iraqi Communist Party.

Qasim's change of policy aggravated his relationship with Arif who, despite being subordinate to Qasim, had gained great prestige as the perpetrator of the coup. Arif capitalised upon his new-found position by engaging in a series of widely publicised public speeches, during which he strongly advocated union with the UAR and making numerous positive references to Nasser, while remaining noticeably less full of praise for Qasim. Arif's criticism of Qasim gradually became more pronounced. This led Qasim to take steps to counter his potential rival. He began to foster relations with the Iraqi Communist Party, which attempted to mobilise support in favour of his policies. He also moved to counter Arif's power base by removing him from his position as deputy commander of the armed forces.

On 30 September 1958 Qasim removed Arif from his roles as Deputy Prime Minister and Minister of the Interior. Qasim attempted to remove Arif's disruptive influence by offering him a role as Iraqi ambassador to West Germany in Bonn. Arif refused, and in a confrontation with Qasim on 11 October he is reported to have drawn his pistol in Qasim's presence, although whether it was to assassinate Qasim or commit suicide is a source of debate. No blood was shed, and Arif agreed to depart for Bonn. However, his time in Germany was brief, as he attempted to return to Baghdad on 4 November amid rumours of an attempted coup against Qasim. He was promptly arrested, and charged on 5 November with the attempted assassination of Qasim and attempts to overthrow the regime. He was brought to trial for treason and condemned to death in January 1959. He was subsequently pardoned in December 1962 and was sentenced to life imprisonment.

Although the threat of Arif had been negated, another soon arose in the form of Rashid Ali, the exiled former prime minister who had fled Iraq in 1941. He attempted to foster support among officers who were unhappy with Qasim's policy reversals. A coup was planned for 9 December 1958, but Qasim was prepared, and instead had the conspirators arrested on the same date. Ali was imprisoned and sentenced to death, although the execution was never carried out.

=== Kurdish revolts ===
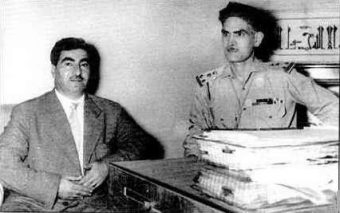
Qasim with Mustafa Barzani

The new Government declared Kurdistan "one of the two nations of Iraq". During his rule, the Kurdish groups selected Mustafa Barzani to negotiate with the government, seeking an opportunity to declare independence.

After a period of relative calm, the issue of Kurdish autonomy (self-rule or independence) went unfulfilled, sparking discontent and eventual rebellion among the Kurds in 1961. Kurdish separatists under the leadership of Mustafa Barzani chose to wage war against the Iraqi establishment. Although relations between Qasim and the Kurds had been positive initially, by 1961 relations had deteriorated and the Kurds had become openly critical of Qasim's regime. Barzani had delivered an ultimatum to Qasim in August 1961 demanding an end to authoritarian rule, recognition of Kurdish autonomy, and restoration of democratic liberties.

=== The Mosul uprising and subsequent unrest ===
Tumultuous military parade in Baghdad, 14 July 1959

During Qasim's term, there was much debate over whether Iraq should join the United Arab Republic, led by Gamal Abdel Nasser. Having dissolved the Hashemite Arab Federation with the Hashemite Kingdom of Jordan, Qasim refused to allow Iraq to enter the federation, although his government recognized the republic and considered joining it later.

Qasim's growing ties with the communists served to provoke rebellion in the northern city of Mosul led by Arab nationalists in charge of military units. In an attempt to reduce the likelihood of a potential coup, Qasim had encouraged a communist-backed Peace Partisans rally to be held in Mosul on 6 March 1959. Some 250,000 Peace Partisans and communists thronged through Mosul's streets that day. Although the rally passed peacefully, on 7 March, skirmishes broke out between communists and nationalists. This degenerated into a major civil disturbance over the following days. Although the rebellion was crushed by the military, it had a number of adverse effects that impacted Qasim's position. First, it increased the power of the communists. Second, it increased the strength of the Ba’ath Party, which had been growing steadily since the 14 July coup. The Ba'ath Party believed that the only way of halting the engulfing tide of communism was to assassinate Qasim.

The Ba'ath Party turned against Qasim because of his refusal to join Gamal Abdel Nasser's United Arab Republic. To strengthen his own position within the government, Qasim created an alliance with the Iraqi Communist Party (ICP), which was opposed to any notion of pan-Arabism. Later that year, the Ba'ath Party leadership put in place plans to assassinate Qasim. A young Saddam Hussein was a leading member of the operation. At the time, the Ba'ath Party was more of an ideological experiment than a strong anti-government fighting machine. The majority of its members were either educated professionals or students, and Saddam fit in well within this group.

The choice of Saddam was, according to journalist Con Coughlin, "hardly surprising". The idea of assassinating Qasim may have been Nasser's, and there is speculation that some of those who participated in the operation received training in Damascus, which was then part of the United Arabic Republic. However, "no evidence has ever been produced to implicate Nasser directly in the plot".

The assassins planned to ambush Qasim on Al-Rashid Street on 7 October 1959. One man was to kill those sitting at the back of the car, the others killing those in front. During the ambush it was claimed that Saddam began shooting prematurely, which disrupted the whole operation. Qasim's chauffeur was killed, and Qasim was hit in the arm and shoulder. The would-be assassins believed they had killed him and quickly retreated to their headquarters, but Qasim survived.

The growing influence of communism was felt throughout 1959. A communist-sponsored purge of the armed forces was carried out in the wake of the Mosul revolt. The Iraqi cabinet began to shift towards the radical-left as several communist sympathisers gained posts in the cabinet. Iraq's foreign policy began to reflect this communist influence, as Qasim removed Iraq from the Baghdad Pact on 24 March, and then fostered closer ties with the Soviet Union, including extensive economic agreements. However, communist successes encouraged them to attempt to expand their power. The communists attempted to replicate their success at Mosul in Kirkuk. A rally was called for 14 July which was intended to intimidate conservative elements. Instead it resulted in widespread bloodshed between ethnic Kurds (who were associated with the ICP at the time) and Iraqi Turkmen, leaving between 30 and 80 people dead.

Despite being largely the result of pre-existing ethnic tensions, the Kirkuk "massacre" was exploited by Iraqi anti-communists and Qasim subsequently purged the communists and in early 1960 he refused to license the ICP as a legitimate political party. Qasim's actions led to a major reduction of communist influence in the Iraqi government. Communist influence in Iraq peaked in 1959 and the ICP squandered its best chance of taking power by remaining loyal to Qasim, while his attempts to appease Iraqi nationalists backfired and contributed to his eventual overthrow. For example, Qasim released Salih Mahdi Ammash from custody and reinstated him in the Iraqi army, allowing Ammash to act as the military liaison to the Ba'athist coup plotters. Furthermore, notwithstanding his outwardly friendly posture towards the Kurds, Qasim was unable to grant Kurdistan autonomous status within Iraq, leading to the 1961 outbreak of the First Iraqi–Kurdish War and secret contacts between the Kurdistan Democratic Party (KDP) and Qasim's Ba'athist opponents in 1962 and 1963. The KDP promised not to aid Qasim in the event of a Ba'athist coup, ignoring long-standing Kurdish antipathy towards pan-Arab ideology. Disagreements between Qasim, the ICP and the Kurds thus created a power vacuum that was exploited by a "tiny" group of Iraqi Ba'athists in 1963.

=== Foreign policy ===
Qasim had withdrawn Iraq from the pro-Western Baghdad Pact in March 1959 and established friendly relations with the Soviet Union. Iraq also abolished its treaty of mutual security and bilateral relations with the UK. Iraq also withdrew from the agreement with the United States that was signed by the Iraqi monarchy in 1954 and 1955 regarding military, arms, and equipment. On 30 May 1959, the last of the British soldiers and military officers departed the al-Habbāniyya base in Iraq. Qasim supported the Algerian and Palestinian struggles against France and Israel.

Qasim further undermined his rapidly deteriorating domestic position with a series of foreign policy blunders. In 1959 Qasim antagonised Iran with a series of territory disputes, most notably over the Khuzestan region of Iran, which was home to an Arabic-speaking minority, and the division of the Shatt al-Arab waterway between south eastern Iraq and western Iran. On 18 December 1959, Abd al-Karim Qasim declared: "We do not wish to refer to the history of Arab tribes residing in Al-Ahwaz and Muhammareh (Khurramshahr). The Ottomans handed over Muhammareh, which was part of Iraqi territory, to Iran." After this, Iraq started supporting secessionist movements in Khuzestan, and even raised the issue of its territorial claims at a subsequent meeting of the Arab League, without success.

In June 1961, Qasim re-ignited the Iraqi claim over the state of Kuwait. On 25 June, he announced in a press conference that Kuwait was a part of Iraq, and claimed its territory. Kuwait, however, had signed a recent defence treaty with the British, who came to Kuwait's assistance with troops to stave off any attack on 1 July. These were subsequently replaced by an Arab force (assembled by the Arab League) in September, where they remained until 1962.

The result of Qasim's foreign policy blunders was to further weaken his position. Iraq was isolated from the Arab world for its part in the Kuwait incident, whilst Iraq had antagonised its powerful neighbour, Iran. Western attitudes toward Qasim had also cooled, due to these incidents and his perceived communist sympathies. Iraq was isolated internationally, and Qasim became increasingly isolated domestically, to his considerable detriment.

After assuming power, Qasim demanded that the Anglo American-owned Iraq Petroleum Company (IPC) sell a 20% ownership stake to the Iraqi government, increase Iraqi oil production, hire Iraqi managers, and cede control of most of its concessionary holding. When the IPC failed to meet these conditions, Qasim issued Public Law 80 on 11 December 1961, which unilaterally limited the IPC's concession to those areas where oil was actually being produced—namely, the fields at Az Zubair and Kirkuk—while all other territories (including North Rumaila) were returned to Iraqi state control. This effectively expropriated 99.5% of the concession. British and US officials and multinationals demanded that the Kennedy administration place pressure on the Qasim regime. The Government of Iraq, under Qasim, along with five petroleum-exporting nations met at a conference held 10–14 September 1960 in Baghdad, which led to the creation of the International Organization of Petroleum-Exporting Countries (OPEC).

== Overthrow and execution ==
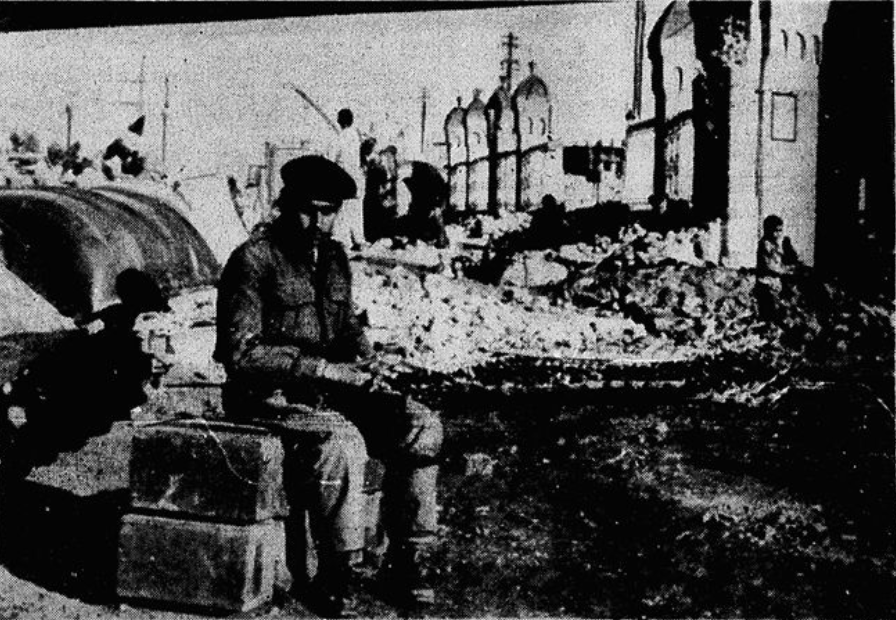
A soldier at the office of Ministry of Defense in the aftermath of the coup, February 1963

In 1962, both the Ba'ath Party and the United States Central Intelligence Agency (CIA) began plotting to overthrow Qasim, with U.S. government officials cultivating supportive relationships with Ba'athist leaders and others opposed to Qasim. On 8 February 1963, Qasim was overthrown by the Ba'athists in the Ramadan Revolution; long suspected to be supported by the CIA. Pertinent contemporary documents relating to the CIA's operations in Iraq have remained classified and as of 2021, "[s]cholars are only beginning to uncover the extent to which the United States was involved in organizing the coup", but are "divided in their interpretations of American foreign policy". Bryan R. Gibson, writes that although "[i]t is accepted among scholars that the CIA ... assisted the Ba’th Party in its overthrow of [Qasim's] regime", that "barring the release of new information, the preponderance of evidence substantiates the conclusion that the CIA was not behind the February 1963 Ba'thist coup".

Likewise, Peter Hahn argues that "[d]eclassified U.S. government documents offer no evidence to support" suggestions of direct U.S. involvement. On the other hand, Brandon Wolfe-Hunnicutt cites "compelling evidence of an American role", and that publicly declassified documents "largely substantiate the plausibility" of CIA involvement in the coup. Eric Jacobsen, citing the testimony of contemporary prominent Ba'athists and U.S. government officials, states that "[t]here is ample evidence that the CIA not only had contacts with the Iraqi Ba'th in the early sixties, but also assisted in the planning of the coup". Nathan J. Citino writes that "Washington backed the movement by military officers linked to the pan-Arab Ba‘th Party that overthrew Qasim", but that "the extent of U.S. responsibility cannot be fully established on the basis of available documents", and that "[a]lthough the United States did not initiate the 14 Ramadan coup, at best it condoned and at worst it contributed to the violence that followed".

Qasim was given a short show trial and was shot soon after. He was executed by the Ba'athists inside the Ministry of Defence building; the Ba'athists desecrated his corpse on Iraqi television. Many of his Shi'a supporters believed that he had merely gone into hiding and would appear like the Mahdi to lead a rebellion against the new government. To counter this sentiment and terrorise his supporters, Qasim's dead body was displayed on television in a five-minute long propaganda video called The End of the Criminals that included close-up views of his bullet wounds amid disrespectful treatment of his corpse, which was spat on in the final scene. About 100 government loyalists were killed in the fighting as well as between 1,500 and 5,000 civilian supporters of the Qasim administration or the Iraqi Communist Party during the three-day "house-to-house search" that immediately followed the coup.

== Legacy ==
The 1958 Revolution can be considered a watershed in Iraqi politics, not just because of its obvious political implications (e.g. the abolition of monarchy, republicanism, and paving the way for Ba'athist rule) but also because of its domestic reforms. Despite its shortcomings, Qasim's rule helped to implement a number of positive domestic changes that benefited Iraqi society and were widely popular, especially the provision of low-cost housing to the inhabitants of Baghdad's urban slums. While criticising Qasim's "irrational and capricious behaviour" and "extraordinarily quixotic attempt to annex Kuwait in the summer of 1961", actions that raised "serious doubts about his sanity", Marion Farouk–Sluglett and Peter Sluglett conclude that, "Qasim's failings, serious as they were, can scarcely be discussed in the same terms as the venality, savagery and wanton brutality characteristic of the regimes which followed his own". Despite upholding death sentences against those involved in the 1959 Mosul uprising, Qasim also demonstrated "considerable magnanimity towards those who had sought at various times to overthrow him", including through large amnesties "in October and November 1961". Furthermore, not even Qasim's harshest critics could paint him as corrupt.

The revolution brought about sweeping changes in the Iraqi agrarian sector. Reformers dismantled the old feudal structure of rural Iraq. For example, the 1933 Law of Rights and Duties of Cultivators and the Tribal Disputes Code were replaced, benefiting Iraq's peasant population and ensuring a fairer process of law. The Agrarian Reform Law (30 September 1958) attempted a large-scale redistribution of landholdings and placed ceilings on ground rents; the land was more evenly distributed among peasants who, due to the new rent laws, received around 55% to 70% of their crop. While "inadequate" and allowing for "fairly generous" large holdings, the land reform was successful at reducing the political influence of powerful landowners, who under the Hashemite monarchy had wielded significant power.

Qasim attempted to bring about greater equality for women in Iraq. In December 1959 he promulgated a significant revision of the personal status code, particularly that regulating family relations. Polygamy was outlawed, and minimum ages for marriage were also set out, with 18 being the minimum age (except for special dispensation when it could be lowered by the court to 16). Women were also protected from arbitrary divorce. The most revolutionary reform was a provision in Article 74 giving women equal rights in matters of inheritance. The laws applied to Sunni and Shia alike. The laws encountered much opposition and did not survive Qasim's government.

== Notes ==
Political offices
Preceded by Ahmad Mukhtar Baban	Prime Minister of Iraq; 1958–1963	Succeeded by Ahmed Hassan al-Bakr
