= Bakr Sidqi =

Iraqi army officer (1890–1937)

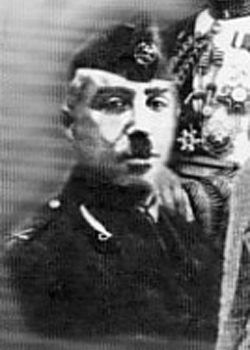
- General Bakr Sadqi in uniform
- Born: 1890; Askar or Baghdad, Ottoman Iraq
- Died: 11 August 1937 (aged 47); Mosul, Hashemite Kingdom of Iraq
- Burial place: Baghdad
- Military career
- Allegiance: Ottoman Empire; Hashemite Kingdom of Iraq
- Branch: (Iraq) Royal Iraqi Army
- Service years: 1913–1937
- Rank: General
- Conflicts: First Balkan War; Second Balkan War; World War I; Arab Revolt; Simele massacre; 1935–36 Iraqi Shia revolts; 1935 Yazidi revolt; Battle of Dayrabun

Bakr Sidqi al-Askari (Arabic: بكر صدقي العسكري; 1890 – 11 August 1937) was an Iraqi general of Kurdish origin, who served as the Chief of the Iraq General Staff of the nation's military. He was assassinated on 11 August 1937, in Mosul.

== Early life ==
Bakr Sidqi bin Shawqi Wais al-Askari was born in 1886 or 1890, either in Askar, a village near Kirkuk, or in Baghdad. He was said to be of mixed Arab-Kurdish parentage, while he was registered as Kurdish in British records, and others described him as an Arabized Kurd. He attended the Ottoman Military College and was known to fluently speak Arabic, Kurdish, Turkish, English, German, and French.

== Military career ==
Having studied at the Military College in Istanbul and graduated as a second lieutenant, he fought in the Balkan Wars and joined the Staff College in Istanbul, graduating in 1915. During the First World War, with the outbreak of the Arab Revolt, Sidqi joined Faisal's army in Syria and served in Aleppo with a number of other Sharifian officers. From 1919 to 1920, he served as an intelligence agent of the British military forces and was later recommended by the British General Staff in 1921 to an officer rank in the Iraqi army after the collapse of Faisal's Arab Kingdom of Syria. His plan was to one day be the Chief of the General Staff but was met with opposition by some Iraqis, who accused him of pushing for a "pro-Kurdish policy." In response, Sidqi highlighted his half-Arab origins, linking himself with familial ties with Jafar al-Askari. He later attended the British Staff College and was considered one of Iraq's most competent officers. He lectured in the military school and achieved the rank of colonel in 1928 and brigadier general in 1933.

In August 1933, Sidqi ordered the Royal Iraqi Army to march to the north to crush so-called 'militant Assyrian separatists' in Simele, near Mosul, which led to 3,000 Assyrian civilians being killed in the region in the Simele massacre.

The British praised him in 1934 as "the best commander in the Iraqi army and the most efficient one". In 1935, he cracked down on the Shia Arab tribal rebellions at al-Rumaitha and al-Diwaniya with unprecedented harshness.

According to Malik Mufti, he systematically promoted Kurds and Turkmens for positions in the army until they were 90% of the high-ranking officers, which generated resentment. Bakr Sidqi was "accused of having tried to set up a Kurdish state in the north of Iraq, which would include the Kurds of Iran and Turkey". According to Bakr Sidqi, the Assyrians had "savagely mutilated the dead, they gouged out their eyes, slit open their stomachs and cut off their noses".

=== Simele massacre ===
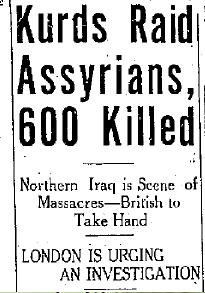
The Lethbridge Herald, 18 August 1933, reporting on the Simele massacre.

In 1933, the U.S. Foreign Service officer in Iraq, Paul Knabenshue, described public animosity towards the Assyrians at a "fever heat". With Iraqi independence, the new Assyrian spiritual-temporal leader, Mar Shimun XXI Eshai demanded autonomy for Assyrians within the Hashemite Kingdom of Iraq, as had been promised by the British and Russians during the First World War, and sought support from Britain. He pressed his case before the League of Nations in 1932. His followers established plans to resign from the Iraq Levies and to regroup as a militia and concentrate in the north, creating a de facto Assyrian enclave.

In June 1933, the young Patriarch was invited to Baghdad for negotiations with Hikmat Sulayman's government and was detained there after refusing to relinquish temporal authority. Mar Shimun and his family would eventually be exiled to Cyprus, forcing the head of the Assyrian Church of the East to be located in Chicago, where it remained until 2015 when it was brought back to Erbil.

In early August 1933, more than 1,000 unarmed Assyrians who had been refused asylum in Syria crossed the border to return to their villages in Northern Iraq. The French, who controlled Syria, notified the Iraqis that the Assyrians were not armed. However, while the Iraqi soldiers were disarming those whose arms had been returned by the French, shots were fired. It is unclear who fired first. The Royal Iraqi Army was defeated, and 30 Iraqi soldiers were killed. Anti-Assyrian xenophobia, apparent throughout the crisis, increased.

When news of the confrontation reached Baghdad, the government feared disaster in the unity of their armed forces. The government used irregular Kurds, who killed more than 1,280 unarmed Assyrians in two Assyrian villages in the week of 2 August, with most of the massacre occurring on 7 August). Then, on 11 August, Sidqi led a heavily armed force to what was then one of the most heavily inhabited Assyrian districts in Iraq, the Simele District.

The Assyrian population of the district of Simele was indiscriminately massacred. In one room alone, 81 Assyrians of the Baz tribe were massacred. Religious leaders were prime targets; eight Assyrian priests were killed during the massacre, including one beheaded and another burnt alive. Women and girls were raped and made to march naked before the Iraqi army commanders while the British IRF airplane took pictures that would be used later against the Iraqi government.

Back in Dohuk, 880 unarmed Assyrian civilians were murdered by Sidqi's men. In the end, around 71 Assyrian villages were targeted in the Mosul and Dohuk districts. On 13 August, Bakr Sidqi moved his troops to Alqosh, where he planned to inflict an additional massacre on the Assyrians there. The main campaign lasted until 16 August, but violent unprovoked attacks on Assyrians were reported up to the end of the month. After the campaign, Bakr Sidqi was invited to Baghdad for a "victory" rally.

The Simele massacre inspired Raphael Lemkin to create the concept of Genocide. In 1933, Lemkin made a presentation to the Legal Council of the League of Nations conference on international criminal law in Madrid, for which he prepared an essay on the Crime of Barbarity as a crime against international law. The concept of the crime, which later evolved into the idea of genocide, was based mostly on the Simele massacre. The Assyrians were living among their "hereditary enemies," the Kurds in Iraq, and it was "at the hand of the Kurds that they suffered most of the loss of life which Raphael Lemkin was to assess as genocide".

=== Coup d'état ===
In 1936, during the reign of Faisal's ineffectual son, King Ghazi, General Sidqi—recently named Chief of the General Staff of the Royal Iraqi Army—staged what was probably the first modern military coup d'état in the Arab world against the government of Yasin al-Hashimi. Eleven Iraqi military planes dropped leaflets over Baghdad on 29 October 1936, requesting the King to take action and dismiss Yasin al-Hashimi's administration and for the installment of the ousted anti-reform Prime Minister, Hikmat Sulayman. In addition, the leaflets warned the citizens that military action would be taken against those who do not "answer our sincere appeal".

The leaflets were signed by Sidqi himself, as the "Commander of the National Forces of Reform".

General Bakr Sidqi could not have found a better time to execute his plan as the Chief of Staff, General Taha al-Hashimi, was in Ankara, Turkey. As the acting Chief of Staff, Sidqi ordered those in the army and in the air force who shared his beliefs of a military coup to adhere to his directions. Any interference by Sidqi's opponents was neutralised by Sidqi himself, who managed to send a telegram to Taha al-Hashimi ordering him not to return. In an interview conducted by Majid Khadduri, he claims that Sidqi had disclosed to Khodduri that the King had called the British Ambassador, Sir Archibald Clark Kerr, over to the Zahur Palace for advice. The ambassador suggested for the King to invite all ministers in the Royal Iraqi Government for an emergency meeting. Of those in attendance were Yasin al-Hashimi, Nuri al-Said, General Ja'far al-Askari and Rashid Ali, Minister of the Interior.

Immediately, the King discounted any notion of a revolutionary movement, but there were reports of some bombing in Serai and the advance of troops towards Baghdad. With the exception of Nuri al-Said, all those present in the palace agreed to comply with the demands of General Bakr Sidqi and allow Hikmat Sulayman to step into power. As a result, Yasin al-Hashimi resigned.

According to Khodduri, Ambassador Kerr suggested for Hikmat to be invited to the meeting. Coincidentally, Sulayman arrived at the palace to deliver the letter, written by Sidqi and Latif Nuri, to the King explaining the implications of the coup.

Jafar al-Askari, who was Minister of Defence during the coup and had served twice as the Prime Minister of Iraq prior to Yasin al-Hashimi, sought out to deter Sidqi from his plans by attempting to distract the two battalions from advancing towards Baghdad. In addition, he tried to appeal to those officers who still regarded him as instrumental in the formation of the Royal Iraqi Army. Concerned at the potetion for any dissension arising from al-Askari's actions, Sidqi sent two of his men, Akram Mustapha, member of the air force, and Ismail Tohalla, who had participated in the Simele massacre, to assassinate him.

== Assassination ==
On August 11, 1937, General Sidqi and the commander of the Iraq Air Force, Major Muhammad Ali Jawad, were both shot to death at Mosul while at the Mosul Aerodrome, where they were preparing to board an airplane flight to Turkey. A state funeral was held the next day for both men the next day, August 12.

The death of al-Askari was widely viewed as challenge to the old government and highlighted Sidqi's quest in ultimately gaining control of the country by first taking over the army. As a result, Nuri al Sa'id was exiled to Cairo, and Yasin al-Hashimi was exiled to Istanbul. However, the coup provoked "anti-Kurdish feelings among Arab nationalists".

Despite the success of the overthrow, Sidqi found it necessary to enter Baghdad with the army and parade with the citizens. According to Khodduri, some felt that it was a move to dissuade any last-minute resistance, and others felt that Sidqi wanted to prove himself with the parade and be applauded for bringing in a new regime for Iraq.

As a result of the coup, Yasin stepped down, insisting that the King write a formal letter accepting his resignation. Sulayman became Prime Minister and Minister of the Interior, but, after overthrowing the government, it was Sidqi, who as commander of the armed forces, essentially ruled Iraq. Some other members of the new cabinet included Abu al-Timman, Minister of Finance, Kamil al-Chadirchi, Minister of Economics and Public Works, Abd al-Latif, Minister of Defence, and Yusuf Izz ad-Din Ibrahim as Minister of Education. Although General Sidqi was instrumental in the formation of the coup, he did not want a cabinet position and remained Chief of the General Staff.

However, the murder of al-Askari created resentment, especially among Iraqi forces, of the new government, and Sulayman's cabinet lasted only ten months until Sidqi was assassinated. As a result, Sulayman resigned as Prime Minister and was succeeded by Jamil al-Midfai.

Sidqi was recognised as one of the most brilliant officers in the Royal Iraqi Army, known for his intelligence, ambition, and self-confidence. He also believed the army was needed to bring about reform and achieve order, a stance he shared with Atatürk and Reza Shah.

== See also ==
- Simele massacre
