= 1935 Yezidi revolt =

Yazidi revolt against Kingdom of Iraq

1935 Yazidi revolt
Date	October 1935
Location	Sinjar Mountains, Kingdom of Iraq
Result	Revolt suppressed
Territorial changes	Sinjar Mountains put under military control

Belligerents
Kingdom of Iraq	Yazidi tribes

Commanders and leaders
(Iraq) Yasin al-Hashimi (Iraq) Bakr Sidqi	No centralized leadership

Casualties and losses
	More than 200 villagers were killed 11 villages were destroyed

The 1935 Yazidi revolt took place in Iraq in October 1935. The Iraqi government, under Yasin al-Hashimi, crushed a revolt by the Yazidi people of Sinjar Mountains against the imposition of conscription. The Iraqi army, led by Bakr Sidqi, reportedly killed over 200 Yazidi and imposed martial law throughout the region. Parallel revolts opposing conscription also broke out that year in the northern (Kurdish populated) and mid-Euphrates (majorly Shia populated) regions of Iraq.

The Yazidis of Jabal Shingal constituted the majority of Iraqi Yazidi population - the third largest non-Muslim minority within the kingdom. In 1939, the region of Jabal Shingal was once again put under military control, together with the Shekhan District.

== See also ==
- List of modern conflicts in the Middle East
- Simele massacre
- 1935–1936 Iraqi Shia revolts
- April 2007 Yazidi massacre
- Qahtaniyah bombings
- Yazidi genocide
