= Kingdom of Iraq =

Hashemite Iraqi Kingdom (1932–1958)

Hashemite Kingdom of Iraq: Arabic: المملكة العراقية الهاشمية; al-Mamlakah al-ʿIrāqiyyah ʾal-Hāshimyyah
- 1932–1958
- Flag Coat of arms
- Anthem: السلام الملكي; As-Salam al-Malaki "The Royal Salute"
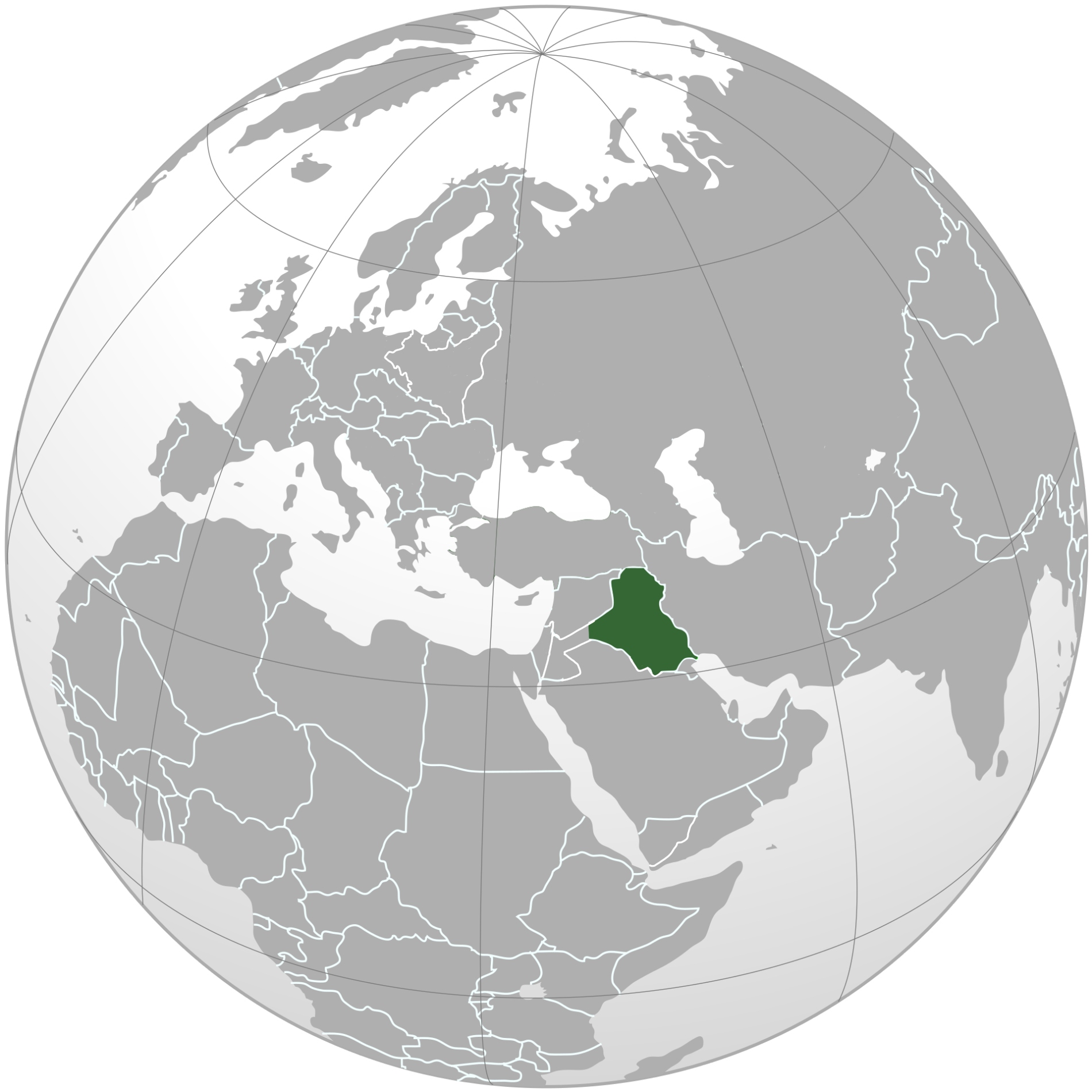
- Capital and largest city: Baghdad
- Official languages: Arabic
- Recognised languages: Armenian; Assyrian; Kurdish; Persian; English
- Religion: Islam (80%); Christianity (15%); Judaism (2%); Yazidism (2%); Mandaeism (1%)
- Demonym: Iraqi
- Government: Unitary constitutional monarchy
- King
  - 1932–1933: Faisal I
  - 1933–1939: Ghazi
  - 1939–1958: Faisal II
- Regent
  - 1939–1941 (1st time): Prince Abdullah
  - 1941: Sharaf bin Rajeh
  - 1941–1953 (2nd time): Prince Abdullah
- Prime Minister
  - 1932–1933 (first): Naji Shawkat
  - 1958–1958 (last): Ahmad Mukhtar Baban
- Legislature: Parliament
  - Upper Chamber: Senate
  - Lower Chamber: Chamber of Deputies
- Historical era: Interwar period; World War II; Cold War
  - Independence from United Kingdom: 3 October 1932
  - Coup d'état: 1 April 1941
  - Anglo-Iraqi War: 2–31 May 1941
  - Baghdad Pact: 24 February 1955
  - Monarchy abolished: 14 July 1958
- Currency: Iraqi dinar
Preceded by	Succeeded by
Mandatory Iraq	Arab Federation
- Today part of: Iraq

The Hashemite Kingdom of Iraq (Note: Arabic: المملكة العراقية الهاشمية, romanized: al-Mamlakah al-ʿIrāqiyyah ʾal-Hāshimiyyah, lit. 'Iraqi Hashemite Kingdom') was the Iraqi state located in the Middle East from 1932 to 1958. It was founded on 23 August 1921 as the Kingdom of Iraq, following the defeat of the Ottoman Empire in the Mesopotamian campaign of the World War I. Although a League of Nations mandate was awarded to the United Kingdom in 1920, the 1920 Iraqi revolt resulted in the scrapping of the original mandate plan in favour of a formally sovereign Iraqi kingdom, but one that was under effective British administration. The plan was formally established by the Anglo-Iraqi Treaty. The population of the Kingdom was 2.8 million at the founding in 1928, and by the end of the Kingdom in 1958 it was 6.5 million.

The role of the United Kingdom in the formal administration of the Kingdom of Iraq was ended in 1932, following the Anglo-Iraqi Treaty of 1930. Then officially a fully independent kingdom, it underwent a period of turbulence under its Hashemite rulers throughout its entire existence. Establishment of Sunni Islam in Iraq was followed by Assyrian, Yazidi and Shi'a unrests, which were all brutally suppressed. In 1936, the first military coup took place in the kingdom, as Bakr Sidqi succeeded in replacing the acting Prime Minister with his associate. Multiple coups followed in a period of political instability, peaking in 1941.

During World War II, the Iraqi government of the Prince-Regent, Abd al-Ilah, was overthrown in 1941 by the Golden Square officers, headed by Rashid Ali. The short-lived pro-Nazi government of Iraq was defeated in May 1941 by the Allied forces in the Anglo-Iraqi War. Iraq was later used as a base for Allied attacks on the Vichy French-held Mandate of Syria and support for the Anglo-Soviet invasion of Iran. At the same time, the Kurdish leader Mustafa Barzani led a rebellion against the central government in Baghdad. After the failure of the uprising, Barzani and his followers fled to the Soviet Union.

In 1945, during the final stages of World War II, Iraq joined the United Nations and became a founding member of the Arab League. In 1948, massive violent protests, known as the Al-Wathbah uprising, broke out across Baghdad as a popular demand against the government treaty with the British, and with support from the communists. More protests continued in the spring, but were interrupted in May, when martial law was imposed after Iraq entered the 1948 Arab–Israeli War with other members of the Arab League.

In February 1958, King Hussein of Jordan and Prince Abd al-Ilah proposed a union of Hashemite monarchies to counter the recently formed Egyptian–Syrian union. The resulting Arab Federation, formed on 14 February 1958, was short-lived and ended the same year with a military coup led by Abdul-Karim Qasim deposing the monarchy.

== Kingdom of Iraq under de facto British administration ==
The territory of Iraq was under Ottoman dominance until the end of the First World War, becoming an occupied territory under the British military from 1918. In order to transform the region to civil rule, Mandatory Mesopotamia was proposed as a League of Nations Class A mandate under Article 22 and entrusted to the United Kingdom of Great Britain and Ireland, when the former territories of that Ottoman Empire were divided in August 1920 by the Treaty of Sèvres. However, the 1920 Iraqi revolt resulted in the scrapping of the original mandate plan. Instead, the Kingdom of Iraq was recognised as a sovereign country under King Faisal I of Iraq. Not withstanding the formal sovereignty of the Iraqi king, a treaty of alliance was concluded between the Kingdom of Iraq and the United Kingdom in 1922 called the Anglo-Iraqi Treaty. It provided the United Kingdom with a role in the administration and governance of Iraq. King Faisal had previously been proclaimed King of Syria by a Syrian National Congress in Damascus in March 1920 but was ejected by the French in July of the same year. The British RAF retained certain military control. In this manner, Iraq remained under de facto British administration until 1932.

Under King Faisal of Iraq, the civil government of postwar Iraq was led by the High Commissioner, Sir Percy Cox, and his deputy, Colonel Arnold Wilson. British reprisals after the murder of a British officer in Najaf failed to restore order. British administration had yet to be established in the mountains of north Iraq. The most striking problem facing the British was the growing anger of the nationalists in the Iraqi kingdom.

== History ==
=== Independence ===
With the signing in Baghdad of the Anglo-Iraqi Treaty on 30 June 1930 and the settling of the Mosul Question, Iraqi politics took on a new dynamic. The treaty came into force on 3 October 1932, when the Kingdom of Iraq officially became fully independent as the Hashemite Kingdom of Iraq. The emerging class of Sunni and Shia landowning tribal sheikhs vied for positions of power with wealthy and prestigious urban-based Sunni families and with Ottoman-trained army officers and bureaucrats. Because Iraq's newly established political institutions were the creation of a foreign power, and because the concept of democratic government had no precedent in Iraqi history, the politicians in Baghdad lacked legitimacy and never developed deeply rooted constituencies. Thus, despite a constitution and an elected assembly, Iraqi politics was more a shifting alliance of important personalities and cliques than a democracy in the Western sense. The absence of broadly based political institutions inhibited the early nationalist movement's ability to make deep inroads into Iraq's diverse social structure.

The new Anglo-Iraqi Treaty was signed in June 1930. It provided for a "close alliance," for "full and frank consultations between the two countries in all matters of foreign policy," and for mutual assistance in case of war. Iraq granted the British the use of air bases near Basra and at Al Habbaniyah and the right to move troops across the country. The treaty, of twenty-five years' duration, was to come into force upon Iraq's admission to the League of Nations. This occurred on October 3, 1932.

In 1932, the Hashemite Kingdom of Iraq was granted full independence under King Faisal I. However, the British retained military bases in the country. Iraq was granted official independence on 3 October 1932 in accordance with an agreement signed by the United Kingdom in June 1930, whereby the United Kingdom would end its effective mandate on the condition that the Iraqi government would allow British advisers to take part in government affairs, allow British military bases to remain, and a requirement that Iraq assist the United Kingdom in wartime. Strong political tensions existed between Iraq and the United Kingdom even upon gaining independence. After gaining nominal independence in 1932, the Iraqi government immediately declared that Kuwait was rightfully a territory of Iraq. Kuwait had loosely been under the authority of the Ottoman vilâyet of Basra for centuries until the British had formally severed it from the Ottoman influence after the First World War. It was on this basis the Iraqi government stated that Kuwait was a British imperialist invention.

=== Political instability and army coups, 1933–1941 ===
After Faisal died in September 1933, King Ghazi reigned as a figurehead from 1933 to 1939, when he was killed in a motor accident. Pressure from Arab nationalists and Iraqi nationalists demanded that the British leave Iraq, but their demands were ignored by the United Kingdom.

Upon achieving official independence in October 1932, political tensions arose over the continued British presence in the new Hashemite Kingdom of Iraq, with Iraq's government and politicians split between those considered pro-British politicians, such as Nuri as-Said, who did not oppose a continued British presence, and anti-British politicians, such as Rashid Ali al-Gaylani, who demanded that remaining British influence in the country be removed.

Various ethnic and religious factions tried to gain political accomplishments during this period, often resulting in violent revolts and a brutal suppression by the Iraqi military, led by Bakr Sidqi. In 1933, thousands of Assyrians were killed in the Simele massacre, in 1935–1936 a series of Shi'a uprisings were brutally suppressed in mid-Euphrates region of Iraq, and in parallel an anti-conscription Kurdish uprising in the north and a Yazidi revolt in Jabal Sinjar were crushed in 1935. Throughout the period political instability led to an exchange of numerous governments. Bakr Sidqi himself ascended to power in 1936, following a successful coup d'état against prime minister Yasin al-Hashimi but was later assassinated in 1937 during a visit to Mosul, followed by the death of King Ghazi in a car crash in 1939 suspected to have been planned by the British, causing a regency under Prince 'Abd al-Ilah over the 4 year old king Faisal II of Iraq lasting until 1953.

From 1917 to 1946, five coups by the Iraqi Army occurred, led by the chief officers of the army against the government to pressure the government to concede to army demands.

=== Anglo-Iraqi War and second British occupation ===
The 1941 Iraqi coup d'état overthrew the pro-British Prime minister Taha al-Hashimi and placed Rashid Ali al-Gaylani as prime minister of a pro-Nazi government called "the National defense government", the Regent 'Abd al-Ilah fled the royal palace after learning of this and with British support went to Habbaniyah then to Basra, he would spend the rest of the following months in Jordan and the Mandate of Palestine. His fleeing caused a constitutional crisis upon the new government. Rashid Ali did not abolish the monarchy, but installed ٍSharif Sharaf bin Rajeh as a more compliant Regent instead, and attempted to restrict the rights of the British under the treaty from 1930. Rashid Ali attempted to secure control over Iraq asking assistance of Nazi Germany, Fascist Italy and Imperial Japan.

On April 20 the Royal Iraqi Army established itself on the high ground to the south of the Habbaniyah air force base. An Iraqi envoy was sent to demand that no movements, either ground or air, were to take place from the base. The British refused the demand and then themselves demanded that the Iraqi army leave the area at once. After a further ultimatum given in the early hours of May 2 expired, at 0500 hours the British began bombing the Iraqi troops threatening the base, marking the beginning of the Anglo-Iraqi War.

Hostilities lasted from May 2 to May 31, 1941, between Iraqis and the British and their indigenous Assyrian Levies. The British would continue to occupy Iraq for many years afterwards.

In the aftermath of the Iraqi defeat, a bloody Farhud massacre broke out in Baghdad on June 2, initiated by the Futuwwa youth and Rashid Ali's supporters, resulting in deaths of some 180 Jews and heavy damage to the Jewish community.

=== Following the end of the 1941 coup ===
After the Anglo-Iraqi War ended, Abd al-ilah returned as Regent with Jameel Al-Madfaai as Prime minister and dominated the politics of Iraq until the overthrow of the monarchy and the royal family's assassination in 1958. the Government pursued a largely pro-western policy during this period.

Midfai's government declared martial law in Baghdad and its surroundings, started a purge in government of Pro-Gaylani elements, banned the listening of axis-aligned radio, and various other procedures aimed at keeping security and order in the country. Despite all these security procedures, this did not satisfy the British who demanded the disbanding of the Iraqi army and arresting any who supported, joined, or was sympathetic to the 1941 coup.

Midfaai's government was split over the usage of force to cleanse the country of Pro-Gaylani elements, and some ministers were not amused of having to ally with Britain, neither did the Prime minister Himself entertain the idea of creating so many arrests. This policy outraged both the British and the regent, who saw his policy of empathy as indirectly supporting opposition and radical movements. The minister of Finance, Ibrahim Kamal al-Ghazanfari [ar], was at the top of the politicians who wanted a change to al-Midfai's policy, and believed in the usage of harsher measures to keep security in the country, he submitted his resignation on 2 September 1941.

The resignation of Ibrahim Kamal weakened Midfai's government, and the retired minister began calling for some politician to prepare the formation of a new government, and paved the way for Nuri al-Said to become the head of a new government. Jameel al-Midfaai's government retired and Abd al-Ilah ordered Nuri to form a new government in 9 October.

In 1943, the Kurdish leader Mustafa Barzani led a rebellion against the central government in Baghdad. After the failure of the uprising Barzani and his followers fled to the Soviet Union.

=== The end of the British occupation until the end of the monarchy ===
In 1945, during the final stages of World War II, Iraq joined the United Nations and became a founding member of the Arab League.

The period following the end of the occupation was a time of the creation of various political parties opposed to or supportive of the government including the National Democratic Party led by Kamil Chadirji, the Constitutional Union Party led by Nuri Al-Said, and the Iraqi Independence Party led by Muhammad Mahdi Kubba.

In 1948, massive violent protests, known as the Al-Wathbah uprising, broke out across Baghdad as a popular demand against the government treaty with the British, and with communist party support. More protests continued in spring, but were interrupted in May, with the martial law, when Iraq entered the 1948 Arab–Israeli War along with other members of the Arab League. Various other protests against the government appeared, including the 1952 Iraqi Intifada which ended just before the 1953 Iraqi parliamentary election.

King Faisal II reached his majority on 2 May 1953, ending the regency of Abd al-Ilah, who continued however to be influential in politics due to his influence on the young king.

In 1955, to counter the influence of the Soviet Union on the Middle East, Iran, Iraq, Pakistan, Turkey and the United Kingdom signed the Baghdad Pact, with the United States being heavily involved in the negotiations to form it. Major protest and opposition followed the pact, as many did not approve of an alliance led by the west.

In September 1956, a planned coup was discussed during spring training by a military faction known as the free officers (inspired by the Egyptian Free Officers Movement) which planned to launch the coup after training by controlling strategic sites in Baghdad and arresting the Regent and King. The coup failed however, as the training was suddenly stopped .

In February 1958, King Hussein of Jordan and `Abd al-Ilāh proposed a union of Hāshimite monarchies to counter the recently formed Egyptian–Syrian union. The resulting Arab Federation was formed on 14 February 1958.

=== 14 July Revolution and the end of the monarchy ===
The Hashemite monarchy lasted until 1958, when it was overthrown through a coup d'état by the Iraqi Army, known as the 14 July Revolution. King Faisal II along with members of the Royal Family were executed in the courtyard of the Rihab Palace in central Baghdad (the young King had not yet moved into the newly completed Royal Palace). The coup brought Abd al-Karim Qasim to power. He withdrew from the Baghdad Pact and established friendly relations with the Soviet Union.

Iraq under the monarchy faced two bare alternatives: either the country would have plunged into chaos or its population should become universally the clients and dependents of an omnipotent but capricious and unstable government. To these two alternatives the overthrow of the monarchy has not added a third.

The task of the subsequent governments was to find that third alternative, mainly to establish a modern state that is stable but also politically integrated.

== Demographics ==
The population estimate in 1920 was 3 million, with the largest ethnic groups being Arabs, Kurds, Assyrians, and Turkmens, with minorities of Persians, Yezidis, Jews, Mandaeans, Shabaks, Armenians, and Kawliyah. During the Iraqi Hashemite rule, Arab population began to expand at the expense of other ethnic groups both due to higher birth rates and government policies which preferred Arab Sunni minority over other ethnic and religious groups.

In 1955, Iraqi population reached 6.5 million people. This was after the Iraqi Kingdom lost the most of its Jewish population following Operation Ezra and Nehemiah (some 130 thousand people) in 1951–1952.

== Government ==
The Kingdom of Iraq was a constitutional monarchy with a King and prime minister. There was a parliament that consisted of two houses: Senate and the Chamber of Deputies. Members of the Senate were appointed by the King while members of the Chamber of Deputies were popularly elected. All legislation needed to be approved by the King after it was "submitted to each house". Iraq had universal male suffrage but women were not allowed to vote. The Kingdom of Iraq de jure utilized a parliamentary system with the prime minister serving as head of government, but the king slowly increased in having higher powers then the parliament over time.

Iraq also had a centralised unitary system of government with British maintenance and support.

=== Foreign relations ===
Upon becoming independent in 1932 Iraq did so with concessions to the British with some of them being: the British being allowed to keep air bases along with being able to train and supply the Iraqi army. It also became a member of the League of Nations in 1932. Iraq was a member of the Saadabad Pact along with Turkey, Iran and Afghanistan which was signed in 1937.

== See also ==
- List of Kings of Iraq
- Republic of Iraq
- History of Iraq
- San Remo conference, the conference among victorious Allied powers that partitioned the Ottoman Empire and led to the Kingdom of Iraq
