= Ali al-Marhun =

Saudi Arabian jurist and author (1916–2010)

Ali Mansour Ali Al-Marhun
- Born: February 9, 1916; Qatif, Saudi Arabia
- Died: January 13, 2010 (aged 93)
- Resting place: weede cemetery
- Education: Hawza Najaf
- Occupation(s): Faqih, writer, poet
- Years active: 1947–2010

Ali Mansour Ali Al-Marhun (Arabic: علي منصور علي المرهون; 9 February 1916 – 13 January 2010) was a Saudi Shia faqih, writer and poet. He was born Qatif to a well-known family. He learned Arabic calligraphy and mastered the Classical Arabic language and memorized the Quran all before the age of twenty, and then he went to Hawza Najaf to begin studying Islam. He knew all of the scholars of his time, including Muhsin al-Hakim, Muhammad Baqir al-Sadr, Muhammad Husayn Kashif al-Ghita', Mohammad-Taqi al-Jawahiri, and Abu al-Qasim al-Khoei. After receiving his title and completing studies he returned to his homeland and performed religious and charitable missions. He has been writing since 1947, and has many books, and several poetry collections. He died at the age of 93 and was buried in a weede cemetery.
