= 1935–1936 Iraqi Shia revolts =

Uprising by Shia tribesmen

Date	1935–1936
Location	Kingdom of Iraq
Result	Revolts suppressed

Belligerents
Kingdom of Iraq	(Iraq) Iraqi Shia tribesmen Ikha Party

Commanders and leaders
(Iraq) Ali Jawdat (Iraq) Bakr Sidqi (Iraq) Yasin al-Hashimi	(Iraq) Muhammad Husayn Kashif al-Ghita' (Iraq) Abdul Wahid al-Hajj Sikkar

Casualties and losses
90+ killed, 2 aircraft downed, dozens captured and executed (1936)	About a 100 killed (1935) a dozen hanged (1936)
- Total: around 200 killed

The 1935 Rumaytha and Diwaniyya revolt or the 1935–1936 Iraqi Shia revolts consisted of a series of Shia tribal uprisings in the mid-Euphrates region against the Sunni-dominated authority of the Kingdom of Iraq. In each revolt, the response of the Iraqi government was to use military force to crush the rebellions with little mercy. The administrative task of this forceful disciplining of the Shi'a tribes fell to General Bakr Sidqi.

The Shia tribes of the mid-Euphrates region saw themselves increasingly under-represented in the Sunni-dominated Iraqi government, which further deteriorated with the exclusion of key Shia sheikhs from the Iraqi parliament in 1934 elections. As a result, unrest broke out in the mid-Euphrates in January 1935. Following unsuccessful attempts by Shia leaders to achieve relief of certain grievances in return for reconciliation, the rebellion spread to the region of Diwaniyya, led by two powerful sheikhs. The rebellion, however, was pacified within a single week, as internal Iraqi politics allowed the resignation of the Iraqi government.

Following the arrest of one of the more prominent clerical followers of Ayatollah Khashif al-Ghita in May, Shia uprisings again spread in the mid-Euphrates. Martial law was declared in Diwaniyya by Bakr Sidqi and the full power of the Iraqi airforce and army was deployed against the Shia tribesmen. By the end of May, the Shia uprisings were defeated and the revolt was over. However, this did not end the uprisings, as other incidents followed from time to time. Dozens of Shia tribesmen were killed over the course of these events.

The 1935 Shia uprisings posed no direct threat to the central Iraqi rule, since the tribes were too fragmented. Nevertheless, in 1936 the Shia tribes rose up again, killing 90 Iraqi troops and downing two aircraft. Sidqi's troops quickly prevailed, exacting a harsh punishment in destroying homes, imprisoning civilians and conducting public hangings of scores of men.

== Background ==
During the 1930s there was almost perpetual unrest in the Shi'a south fueled by a variety of motives, but underpinned throughout by their continued expulsion from the upper echelons of political power. Denied the opportunity to express discontent through democratic means, the Shi'a often resorted to open revolt.

King Ghazi of Iraq, a Hashemite ruler of Iraq from 1933 to 1939, was driven, amongst other things, by anti-Shia ambitions. As a result, two Shia ministers resigned from the Iraqi government in late 1933 following what in their opinion was a lack of care by the government for majority Shia communities in the area of Gharraf where a dam was to be built but the funds for which were diverted to the expansion of Iraqi army through conscription.

Jamil al-Midfai, who succeeded al-Kailani as the Prime Minister of Iraq, introduced the "National Defense Bill" to the Iraqi parliament in February 1934, setting up the framework for conscription and expansion of the Iraqi armed forces, a project strongly supported by Sunni Arabs, but regarded with suspicion and resentment by many Shia Arabs and Kurds.

In August 1934, elections promoted by al-Midfai and Ali Jawdat resulted in the reduction of Ikha party to just twelve seats and exclusion of most important tribal Shia sheikhs of the mid-Euphrates region from the parliament. A tactical alliance of the Ikha Party and the Shia sheikhs was hence created.

== Uprisings ==
=== January 1935 unrest ===
In January 1935, an unrest swept the mid-Euphrates region. Prominent Shia tribal sheikhs of Najaf and Ayatollah Muhammad Kashif al-Ghita met preceding the events, with the "People's Charter" discussed. The People's Charter was presented to the government in March 1935. The charter accepted the Iraqi state, but focused on concerns that large portions of Iraqi population, who felt ignored by the government of Ali Jawdat.

=== March 1935 Diwaniyya uprising ===
An unsuccessful attempt was made by the Shia leaders to receive certain grievances in return to reconciliation. A petition had also been issued to the Iraqi King to oust Ali Jawdat. As their demands for Jawdat's resignation produced no result, an immediate action followed - Bakr Sidqi was requested to refuse to crush the rebellion, while Ali Jawdat was urged to resign with the dissent of his cabinet. The rebellion then spread to the region of Diwaniyya, led by two powerful sheikhs, who had ties with the Ikha Party and Yasin al-Hashimi. Jamil al-Midfai, successor of Jawdat, had as well to resign on March 15 (just two weeks after his nomination), being uncapable the deal with the situation. Yasin al-Hashimi was then asked by the king to create a new government, effectively carrying out coup d'état against his rivals in March 1935. The rebellion, led by the allies of Yasin al-Hashimi in Diwaniyya, ended within a single week. It was followed by the entry of two chief rebel sheikhs into Baghdad, accompanied by large number of armed militants, who all came to issue a petition to the king, and show-off their force.

Despite the government attempts to pacify the tribes, tribal unrest kept spreading in the mid-Euphrates region in April.

=== May 1935 uprising ===
Following the arrest of one of the more prominent clerical followers of Ayatollah Khashif al-Ghita in May, including Ahmad Asadallah on May 6, Rumaytha Shia tribes of Abu Hasan, Bani Zurayyij and Zawalim tribes revolted. Martial law was declared in Diwaniyya by Bakr Sidqi, and the full power of the Iraqi military employed against the Shia tribesmen. The air force began bombing the rebel villages in Diwaniyya on May 11. On May 13, the Muntafiq tribes of Suq al-Shuyukh and Nasiriyya revolted as well, shortly after which their sheikhs travelled to Najaf to sign the manifesto of Shia tribes against Yasin al-Hashimi. On the night of May 15, the rebels took over the town of Suq al-Shuyukh and cut the railway between Basra and Nasiriyya.

At this point the government, alarmed that the rebellion might further spread, expressed its will to negotiate with Ayatollah Khashif al-Ghita. The government effectively attempted to divide the rebelling tribes, as while Defense Minister Jafar al-Askari met the sheikhs of the Muntafiq tribes in order to persuade them into a truce, the operations against Rumaytha continued until their full suppression on May 21.

The end of the Rumaytha revolt allowed the government to concentrate on the Muntafiq tribesmen and the mujtahids under Ayatollah al-Ghita. Salih Jabir, the Shia governor of Karbala, then persuaded al-Ghita to restrain the Muntafiq tribes from fighting. Upon establishing full control over Rumaytha, Nasiriyya and Suq al-Shuyukh, the government no longer had any interest in continuing negotiations with Khashif al-Ghita.

By the end of May, the tribesmen were defeated and the revolt over.

=== Later events ===
The crackdown in Diwaniyya in May 1935, however didn't end the uprisings, as other incidents followed from time to time. Since May 1935, the Shia uprisings posed no direct threat to the central Iraqi rule, as the tribes were too fragmented.

In 1937, another revolt was crushed by Iraqi military in the mid-Euphrates region.

== Social impact ==
The May 1935 revolt uncovered a lack of community interest within the Iraqi Shia society and absence of strong Shia political leadership, to present their interests in Baghdad.

== Shia tribal uprisings or an internal Iraqi political struggle ==
Though the revolt's participants tribal Shia Muslims, according to Charles Tripp, the events of 1935 did not constitute the "rising of the tribes" or the "Shia against the government", though indeed tribal and communal Shia sentiments were at work.

== See also ==
- Shi'a-Sunni relations
- List of modern conflicts in the Middle East
- 1991 uprisings in Iraq
- 1935 Yazidi revolt
