= Iraq Levies =

20th century military unit in British Iraq

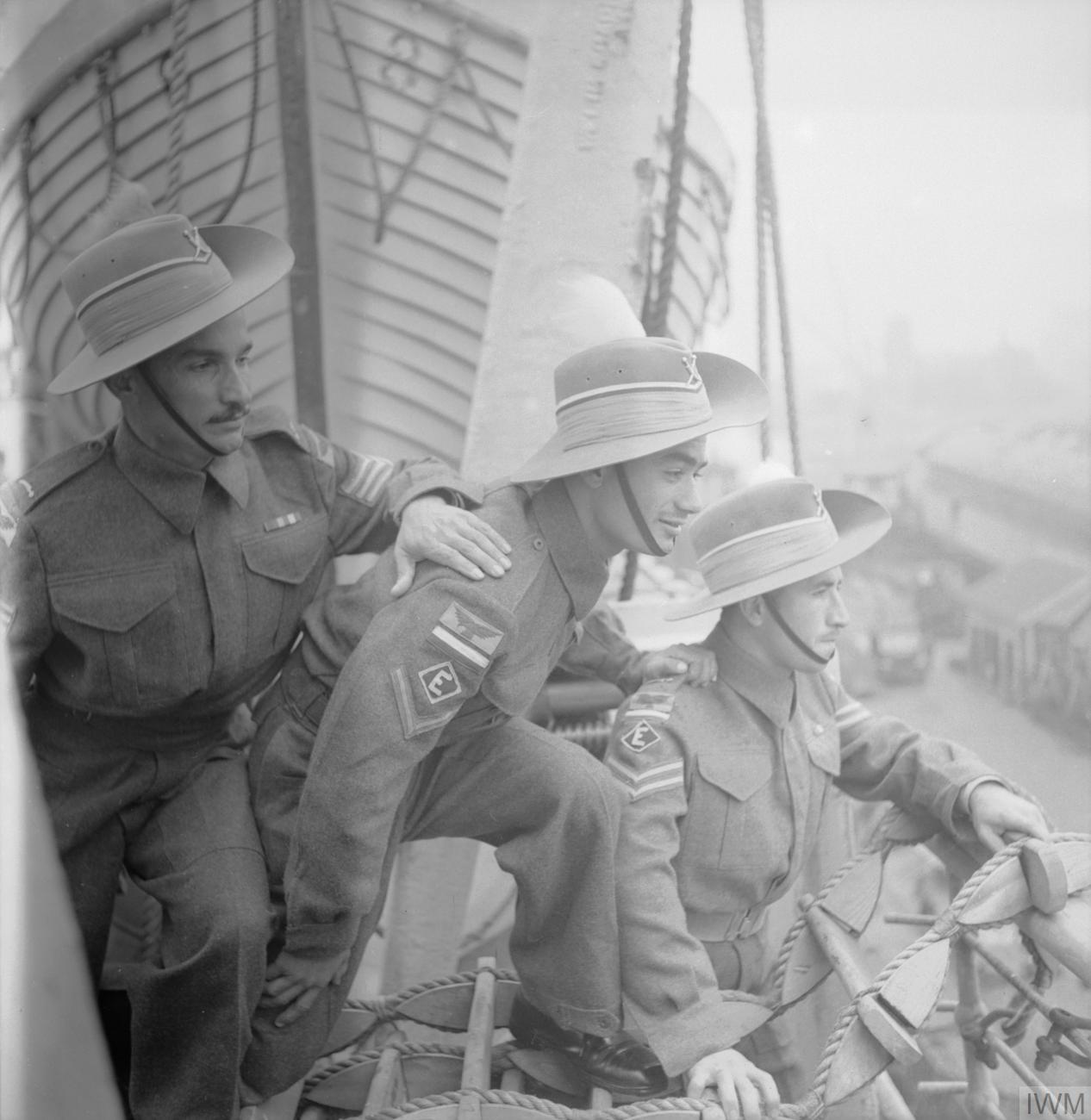
- Three members of the RAF Levies arrive at Liverpool aboard SS Orbita in 1946.
- Active: 1921–1955
- Country: Iraq
- Allegiance: United Kingdom
- Branch: British Army; Royal Air Force
- Type: Air force
- Size: 40,000 Assyrians + Unaccounted Ethnic Groups
- Nickname: Assyrian Levies
- Engagements: Mahmud Barzanji revolts Kirkuk Massacre of 1924; World War II • Anglo-Iraqi War • Syria-Lebanon campaign Ahmed Barzani revolt Simko Shikak revolt (1918–1922); Simko Shikak revolt (1926); Surchi Revolt • Battle of Aqra Dagh • Defense of Jujar

Commanders
- Notable commanders: Dawid Mar Shimun; Agha Petros; Malik Khoshaba; Mandu Zaia; Malik Yaqo; Malik Ismail II; Zaia Giwargis

The Iraq Levies (also known as the Assyrian Levies) was a predominantly Assyrian force and the first Iraqi military force. They were established by the British, who controlled Mandatory Iraq. The Iraq Levies originated in a local armed scout force raised during the First World War. After Iraq became a British Mandate, the force was composed mostly of Assyrians but also some Kurds and Iraqi Turkmen who lived in the north of the country, and the nascent Iraqi Army was recruited first from the Arabs who had joined the Iraqi Levies and later from the general Arab population (Beth-Kamala). Eventually, the Levies enlisted mainly Assyrian soldiers with British officers. The unit initially defended the northern frontiers of the Province of Mosul, which was claimed by Turkey, and massed its army across the frontiers. After 1928, the prime role of the Levies was to guard the British Royal Air Force bases located in Iraq.

The Levies fought alongside the British during the Anglo-Iraqi War, helping defeat Axis-aligned Iraqis, along with distinguishing themselves by their "loyalty to the British and their fighting prowess". The force thereafter grew and survived until it was disbanded in Habbaniya, west of Baghdad, following the end of the British presence in Iraq in 1955. The Assyrians also served in campaigns in Syria and Lebanon and were deployed in other theatres of the Second World War, including in the Balkans and Italy.

== History ==
The Iraq Levies traced their history to the Arab Scouts organized in 1915 by Major J. I. Eadie of the British Indian Army, who served as a Special Service Officer in Al-Muntafiq, Ottoman Iraq. He recruited forty mounted Arabs from the tribes around Nasiriyeh for duty under the Intelligence Department as bodyguard for political officers in southern and central Iraq. By 1918, the Arab Scouts had increased to 5,467 Arabs, Kurds, Turkmens, Marsh Arabs, Yazidis and Assyrians.

== Organisation ==
In 1919, the force changed its name twice, first to the Militia and then to the Iraq Levies in July, when Iraq became a British Mandate. On 12 August 1919, the force became known as the "Arab and Kurdish Levies". Also in 1919, the Iraq Levies were split into a strike force of 3,075 men, based in Baquba, and district police force of 1,786 men. On 1 August 1919, the Levy and Gendarmerie Orders were published in which the control of the Levies and the duties of the Inspecting Officer of the Levies, which had been limited to inspection and administration, were defined. That put the Levies under the control of three different men: the inspecting officer, the political officer of the area and the local administrative commandant. The budget was dealt with by the Inspecting Officer except in the northern Iraqi provinces of Kirkuk, Sulaimani and Mosul Liwas, where it was dealt with by political officers. Laterm the Levies came under their own OC Iraq Levies.

The Levies consisted of a headquarters (first located in Baquba, then Hinaidi, and then in Habbaniya), a hospital (also in Habbaniya) and numerous numbered field companies. Some of the field companies were later organized into battalions for mobile operations.

=== 1920s ===
At the 1921 Cairo Conference, the mission of the Levies was defined as "to relieve the British and Indian Troops in Iraq, take over outposts in Mosul Vilayat (province) and in Kurdistan, previously held by the Imperial Garrison, and generally to fill the gap until such time as the Iraq National Army is trained to undertake these duties".

Until 1921, the Levies had consisted primarily of Arabs, Kurds, Turkmens and Shabaks, and the Assyrians had fought independently alongside the Armenians and Allied Forces in an Assyrian war of independence during the First World War. Now that an Iraqi Army was to be formed, the Arabs and other Muslim peoples were required to join it rather than to go to the Levies. It was decided to enlist ethnic Assyrians in the Levies.

The Assyrians were prized for their discipline, loyalty, bravery and fighting skills by the British, and were Assyrian Church of the East, Syriac Orthodox or Chaldean Catholic Christians and, speaking Eastern Aramaic, a Semitic ethnic and religious minority in a population that was generally Arab or Kurdish and Muslim. In July 1922, orders were issued in which no more Arabs were to be enlisted, as they were required to join the new Iraqi Army, and those serving could not re-engage. A 1922 treaty between Britain and Iraq allowed for the continued existence of the Levies as "local forces of the Imperial garrison" and specified that its members were "members of the British Forces who are inhabitants of Iraq".

By 1923, the ethnic composition of the Iraq Levies had become 50% Assyrian, with a large minority of Kurds, as well as an attached battalion of Marsh Arabs and a few Armenians, Mandeans and Turcomans.

In July 1928, the Levies were transferred from the Colonial Office to the Air Ministrym and its headquarters was transferred to Hinaidi.

By 1928, the Levies had become entirely Assyrian. The Marsh Arab battalion became the 7th Battalion of the Iraqi Army. The force then expanded rapidly and became known as "Shabanas", a Turkish word meaning a semi-military gendarmerie. Its primary duty was now to protect Royal Air Force bases in Iraq.

As the Assyrian force became more disciplined, it rendered excellent service. During the 1920s Arab rebellion, they displayed, under conditions of the greatest trials, steadfast loyalty to their British officers.

In 1920, during the Iraqi Revolt, the Arabs, alongside Kurdish and Turkmen tribes, attacked Assyrian refugee camps, but Assyrian forces managed to defeat the rebels by being excellent fighters with great experience in battle, having successfully fought against Ottomans, Kurds, Persians and Azaris during the First World War. In 1919, the Kurds revolted in northern Iraq, where Levies were tasked with suppressing the rebellion. The rebellion ended in a Kurdish defeat, but the Kurds did not accept British rule, and the idea of establishing a country for Assyrians started other Kurdish revolts.

=== 1930s ===
In 1931, Levies and Iraqi Army units were patrolling Barzan District. Government troops implied government control, which Shaykh Ahmad still wanted to avoid.

On 1 June 1932, the Levies presented a signed memorial to their commanding officer stating that "all the men had decided to cease serving as from 1st July". The reason was Britain had "failed adequately to ensure the future of the Assyrian nation after the termination of their mandate over Iraq".

Following abortive negotiations through Assyrian officers, British troops were brought in from Egypt to take over the guard and garrison duties of the Levies. Assyrian civilian and religious leaders issued a statement urging all ranks of the Levies to continue in "loyal and obedient service" until a national petition to the League of Nations could be responded to. The effect of the intervention was to calm concern amongst the majority of Levies, who resumed their former duties, but 250 men were discharged from service.

=== 1940s ===
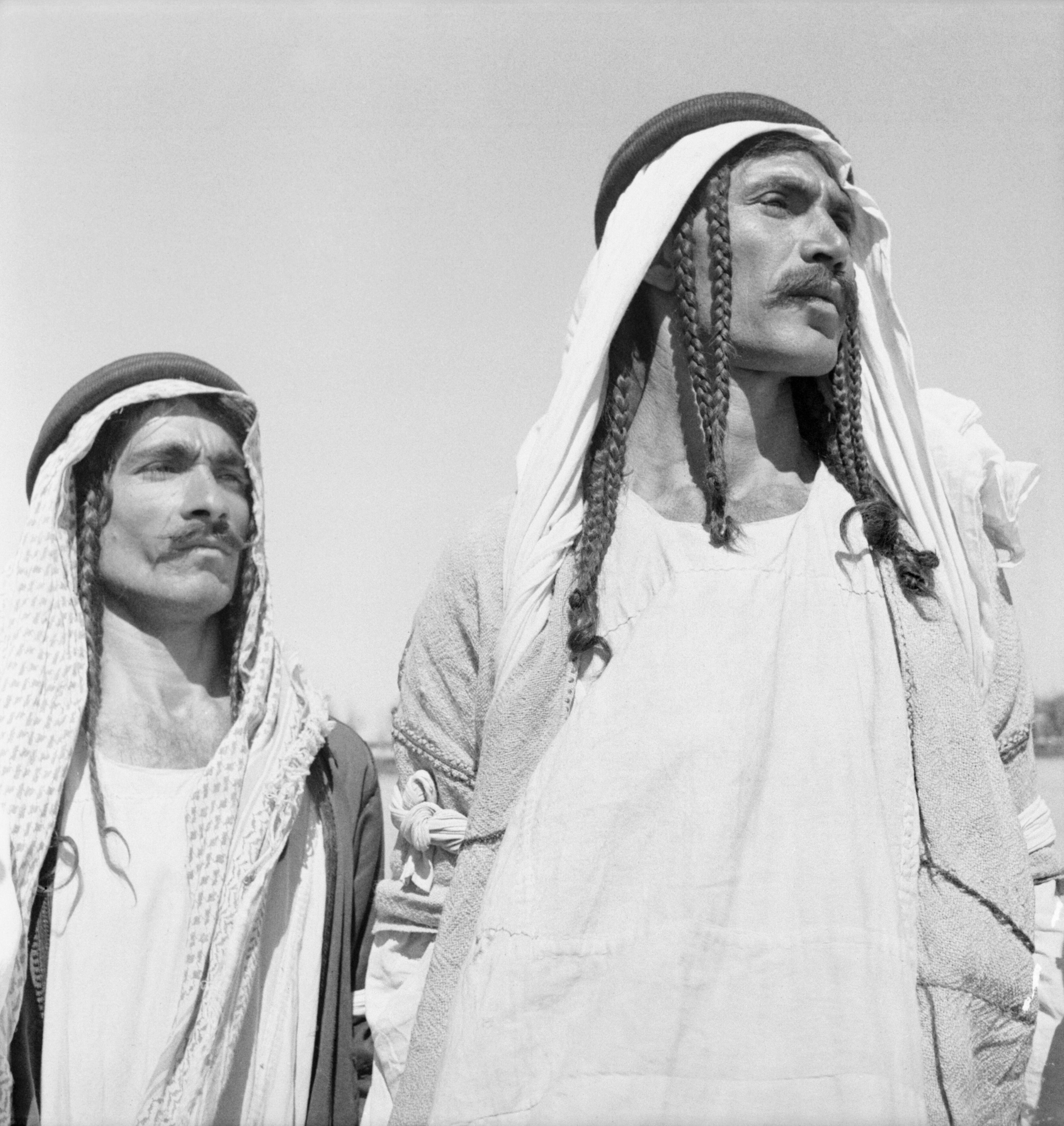
Two Yazidi recruits, 1942, by Cecil Beaton.

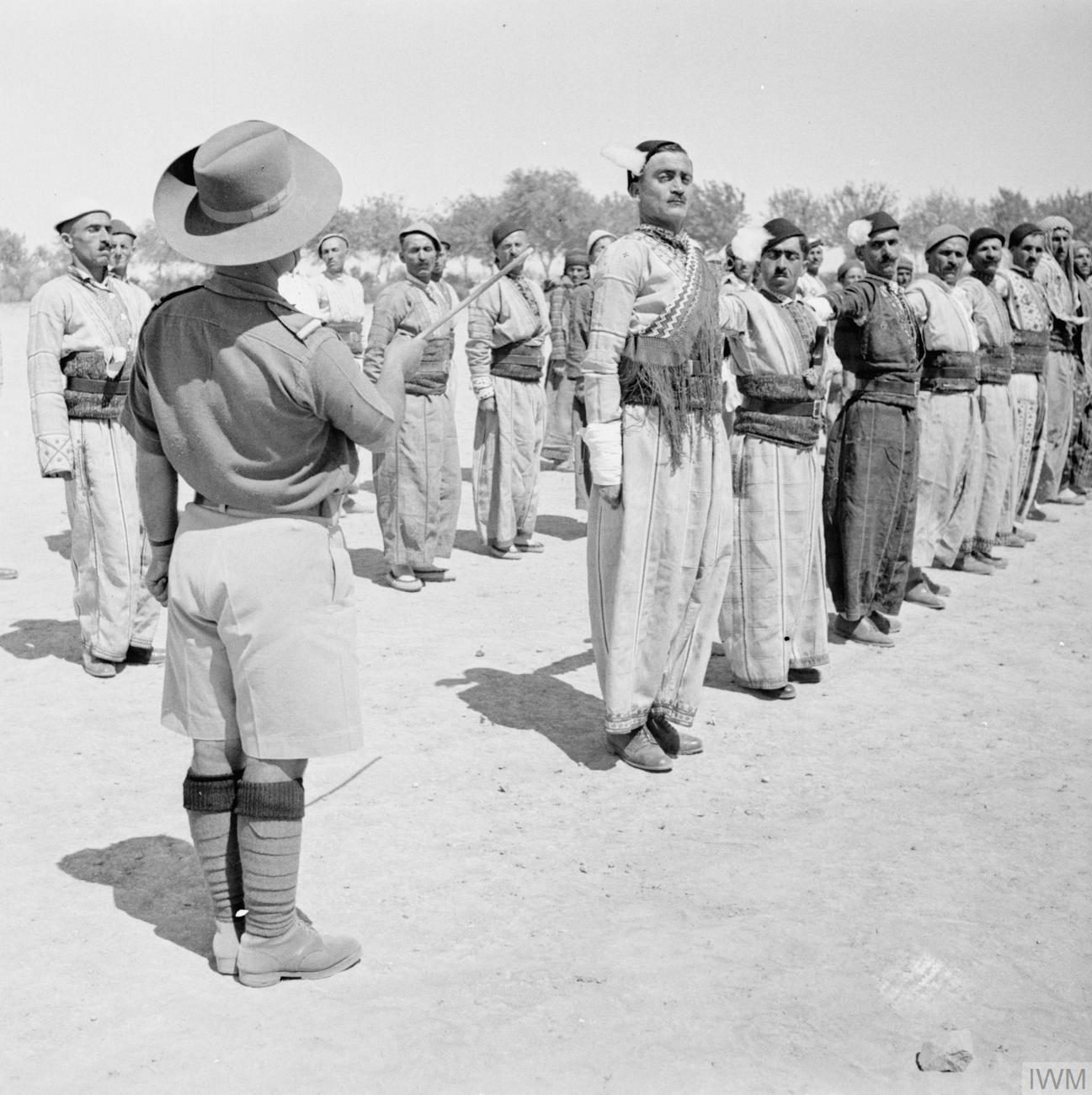
New recruits, still wearing their traditional Assyrian clothes, are drilled at Habbaniya during the Second World War.

In 1940–41 the Battle of Habbaniya took place. During the Rashid Ali rebellion in 1941 the base was besieged by the Iraqi Army encamped on the overlooking plateau. The siege was lifted by the units based at Habbaniya, including pilots from the training school, a battalion of the King's Own Royal Regiment flown in at the last moment, No. 1 Armoured Car Company RAF, and the RAF's Iraq Levies. The subsequent arrival of a relief column (Kingcol), part of Habforce sent from Palestine, then a British mandate, combined with the Habbaniya units to force the rebel forces to retreat to Baghdad. The Levies then recruited an additional 11,000 men, mostly Assyrians but also some Kurds and Yezidi.

"They had dug trenches and were determined on destroying the Assyrians and taking their properties and possessions. Assyrians painfully remembered the massacre of 1933 in Simele and the surrounding villages and pledged 'Never Again!' They remembered the raping and pillaging of defenseless Assyrian villagers."

By 1942, the Iraq Levies consisted of a Headquarters, a Depot, Specialist Assyrian companies, 40 service companies and the 1st Parachute Company, which consisted of 75% Assyrian and 25% Kurd. The new Iraq Levies Disciplinary Code was based largely on the Indian Army Act.

By 1943, the Iraq Levies strength stood at 166 British officers controlling 44 companies: 22 Assyrian, five mixed Assyrian/Yizidi, ten Kurdish and four Arab. Eleven of the Assyrian companies served in Palestine and another four served in Cyprus. The Parachute Company was attached to the Royal Marine Commando and were active in Albania, Italy and Greece. In 1943/1944 the Iraq Levies were renamed the Royal Air Force Levies.

In 1945, after the Second World War, the Levies were reduced to 60 British officers and 1,900 other ranks. The RAF Regiment took over command of the Levies and Army personnel were gradually replaced by RAF personnel. During October 1946 the Levies battalions were redesignated as wings and squadrons to conform to the RAF Regiment procedure. In December the Kurdish Squadrons in Cyprus and the Persian Gulf were returned to Iran.

=== 1950s ===
The RAF Levies continued its escort and guard duties into 1954, when it consisted of 1,200 Assyrians, 400 Kurds and 400 Arabs. The RAF Levies were disbanded on 2 May 1955, and King Faisal was present along with members of the government, as RAF Habbaniya and RAF Shaibah were handed back to the Iraqi government although the RAF remained at Habbaniya until May 1959. Of 515 Assyrians, 195 volunteered for service in the Iraqi Army. At 0800 hours on 3 May 1955, the Levy's quarter guards were relieved by guards from the Iraqi Army. A minor and passing event but it did signify the end of an era as now the Levies had ceased to exist.

The British offered financial compensation, vocational training and resettlement in civilian life to members of the RAF Levies. Those members with 15 or more years of service were pensioned off. Those with less than 15 years were given a gratuity of one month pay for each year of service. Also, the Levies received full pay up to and including 2 May. Those who were to be discharged on that day received pay and a ration allowance for 28 days terminal leave, plus a civilian clothing allowance and a free railway pass to their homes. Those Levies receiving vocational training had their current rates of pay and allowances continue until the end of their training.

== Levy ranks and uniforms ==
Levy officer ranks were derived from ancient Assyrian military ranks:

- Rab Khaila: force leader
- Rab Tremma: leader of 200
- Rab Emma: leader of 100
- Rab Khamshi: leader of 50

Throughout most of their history, the Levies wore standard British tropical service and battle dress uniforms, though with RAF rank insignia after 1943. The most distinctive feature was a slouch hat with brim turned back in the Australian style, worn with a white plume for parade.

== Medals awarded to the Levies ==
=== Cross of Saint George ===
The Russian Empire recommended and awarded the Cross of Saint George to eight Assyrian members in 1917 during the First World War.

=== Order of the British Empire ===
A total of ten Orders of the British Empire were awarded to officers of the Iraq Levies.

Five OBEs were awarded to:

- Rab Khaila Zaya Giwargis – 1926
- Rab Emma Shayin Giwargis – 1926
- Rab Emma Daniel Malik Ismail – 1922
- Rab Khamshi Zaia Giwargis – 1926

Five MBEs were awarded to:

- Rab Kaila Dawid Mar Shimun [honorary]
- Rab Tremma Yacouv Khoshaba
- Rab Tremma Odishu Natan
- Rab Emma Shlimon Bukho
- Rab Khamshi Eshu Hamzo

=== Military Cross ===
The Military Cross was awarded to the following personnel;

- The original Military Cross awarded to Shlimon Slivo.
- Rab Emma Stepan Nissan
- Rab Emma Isaac Sulaqa Gilyana – 1928
- Rab Emma Shamoon Khoshaba – 1928
- Rab Emma Baijan Peko
- Rab Emma Ozariu Tamraz – 1926
- Rab Khamshi Eshu Saper – 1928
- Rab Khamshi Shlimon Sliwa – 1926

=== Military Medal ===
The Military Medal was awarded to the following personnel;

- Rab Emma Warda Eshu
- CQMS 65347 Baitu Marqus – 1928
- Corporal Nikola Dinkha
- Corporal 55416 Mishu Miro – 1927

=== Mentioned in dispatches ===
Six members of the Iraq Levies were Mentioned in dispatches:

- Rab Emma Malam Odai – 1929
- Rab Khamshi Barkhu Hormis – 1929
- Corporal 55416 Barhku Babu – 1928
- Private 55994 Khanania Yakob – 1929
- Corporal 1171 Gewergis Shinu – 1944
- Lance Corporal 10575 Menaz Gerwergis – 1944

"The King has been graciously pleased to approve that the following be Mentioned in recognition of distinguished services in the Middle East:-

... Lincoln Regiment - Capt. H. J. C. Thomas, MBE (64588), attached Iraq Levies..."

(London Gazette, 23 December 1941)

=== Medal for Long Service and Good Conduct ===
Over 300 Medals for Long Service and Good Conduct awarded for over 15 years' service in the Levies.

=== King George Medal with Clasp ===
Dozens of King George Medals with Clasp were awarded in 1922 for operations in Rawanduz, in northern Iraq.

=== General Service Medal with Iraq Clasp ===
The General Service Medal for Iraq was established in 1924 and was awarded to the Levies by King Faisal I for operations in Iraq between 1924 and 1936.

=== Second World War Medals ===
Three different Second World War medals were awarded to members of the Iraq Levies.

- The War Medal 1939–1945 - Awarded to Levies after 28 days of service in the Second World War.
- The 1939-1945 Star - Awarded to Levies after six months service in the Second World War.
- The Italy Star - Awarded to parachute company personnel who served in Albania, Italy and/or Greece.

== See also ==
- RAF Iraq Command
- RAF Habbaniya
- RAF Shaibah
- RAF Regiment
- Kirkuk Massacre of 1924
- Simele massacre
- Iraqforce

For similar units see:

- Mesopotamia Rifles
- Aden Protectorate Levies
