= Simele massacre =

1933 massacre of Assyrians in Iraq

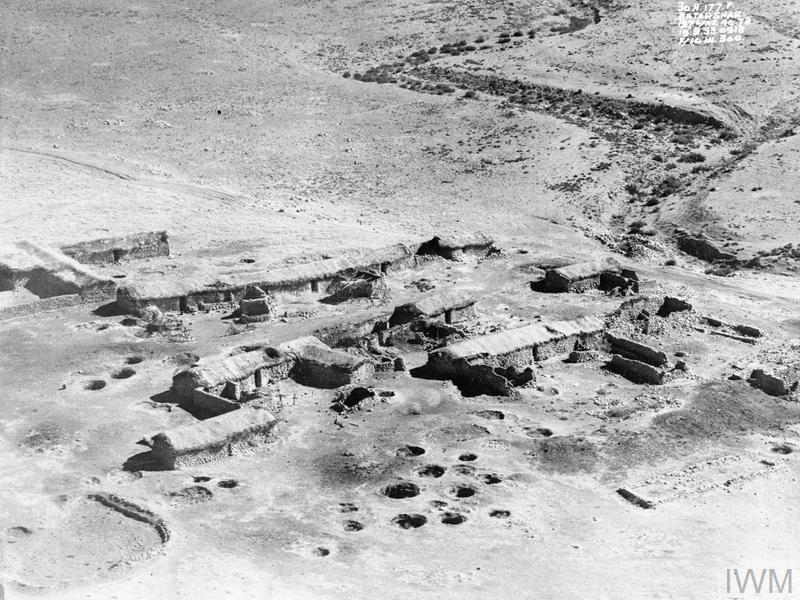
- Aerial view of Batarshah in northern Iraq, an Assyrian village destroyed by Arabs and Kurds in August 1933

- Area where villages were looted Heavily targeted Assyrian villages
- Native name: مذبحة سميل (Arabic) ܦܪܲܡܬܵܐ ܕܣܸܡܹܠܹܐ (Syriac)
- Location: 36°51′30″N 42°51′0″E; Northern Kingdom of Iraq, notably at Simele
- Date: 7 August 1933 – 11 August 1933
- Target: Assyrians
- Attack type: Summary executions, mass murder, looting
- Deaths: 300–600 (British estimates); 3,000-6,000 (Assyrian estimates)
- Victim: Over 20,000 Assyrians became refugees
- Perpetrators: Royal Iraqi Army (led by Bakr Sidqi, Arab and Kurdish tribes
- Motive: Anti-Christian sentiment

The Simele massacre (Syriac: ܦܪܲܡܬܵܐ ܕܣܸܡܹܠܹܐ, romanized: Premta d'Simele, Arabic: مذبحة سميل, romanized: maḏbaḥat Simīl), also known as the Assyrian affair, was a massacre committed by the Kingdom of Iraq under the leadership of the Iraqi-Kurdish army general Bakr Sidqi. The massacre was committed in August 1933 against the Assyrian population of Iraq in and around the village of Simele.

Although primarily known for the attacks in the village of Simele, 54 villages in total are said to have been targeted during the four day period of the massacre, primarily in the Zakho and Simele Districts (now in the modern Duhok Governorate).

The massacre is known partly for having imprinted the memory of persecution on the modern Assyrian identity, while also being regarded as the turning point for the Assyrian naming dispute. Raphael Lemkin's coining of the term genocide was influenced by the events of the massacre.

== Background ==
=== Assyrians of the mountains ===
The majority of the Assyrians affected by the massacres were adherents of the Church of the East (often incorrectly dubbed Nestorian; later known as the Assyrian Church of the East), who originally inhabited the mountainous Hakkari and Barwari regions covering parts of the modern provinces of Hakkâri, Şırnak and Van in Turkey and the Dohuk Governorate in Iraq, with a population ranging between 75,000 and 150,000.

Many Assyrians were relocated by the British to refugee camps in Baquba and later to Habbaniyah, and in 1921 some were enlisted in the Assyrian Levies, a military force under British command. In 1924, in response to attacks on Assyrian civilians, soldiers of the Assyrian Levies rampaged through Kirkuk, killing approximately 300 Muslims. Most Hakkari Assyrians were resettled after 1925 in a cluster of villages in northern Iraq. Some of the villages where the Assyrians settled were leased directly by the government, while others belonged to Kurdish landlords who had the right to evict them at any time.

=== Iraqi independence and crisis ===
During the Ottoman Empire until its partition in the 20th century, Iraq was made up of three provinces: Mosul Vilayet, Baghdad Vilayet, and Basra Vilayet. These three provinces were joined into one Kingdom under the nominal rule of King Faisal by the British after the region became a League of Nations mandate, administered under British control, with the name "State of Iraq". Britain granted independence to the Hashemite Kingdom of Iraq in 1932, on the urging of King Faisal, though the British retained military bases and transit rights for their forces; the Assyrian Levies continued to be stationed in Iraq.

Iraqi nationalists perceived the Assyrian Levies to be a British proxy force that allowed Britain to maintain influence in post-independence Iraq; soldiers of the Levies had not been granted Iraqi citizenship until 1924. The Assyrian Levies received higher pay than their counterparts in the Iraqi military, further increasing resentment towards them. Iraqi nationalists believed the British motive behind raising and maintaining the Levies was to encourage the Assyrians to become independent from Iraq and for other ethnic minorities such as the Kurds to follow their example. The Iraqi military also harbored a hostile attitude towards the Assyrian Levies as the latter had in conjunction with British forces suppressed the Ahmed Barzani revolt after the former had failed to do so.

The end of the British Mandate of Iraq caused considerable unease among the Assyrians, many of whom felt betrayed by the British. For them, any treaty with the Iraqis had to take into consideration their desire for an autonomous position similar to the Ottoman Millet system. The Iraqis, on the other hand felt that the Assyrians' demands were, alongside Kurdish disturbances in the north, a British conspiracy to divide Iraq by agitating its various minorities against the central government.

=== Assyrian demands for autonomy ===
With Iraqi independence, the new Assyrian spiritual-temporal leader, Shimun XXI Eshai (Catholicos Patriarch of the Church of the East), demanded an autonomous Assyrian homeland within Iraq, seeking support from the United Kingdom and pressing his case before the League of Nations in 1932. His followers planned to resign from the Assyrian Levies and to re-group as a militia and concentrate in the north, creating a de facto Assyrian enclave.

In spring 1933, Malik Yaqo, a former Levies officer, was engaged in a propaganda campaign on behalf of Assyrian Patriarch Shimun XXI Eshai (or Mar Shimun), trying to persuade Assyrians not to apply for Iraqi nationality or accept the settlement offered to them by the central government. Yaqo was accompanied by 200 armed men, which was seen as an act of defiance by the Iraqi authorities, while causing distress among the Kurds. The Iraqi government started sending troops to the Dohuk region in order to intimidate Yaqu and dissuade Assyrians from joining his cause.

In June 1933, Shimun XXI Eshai was invited to Baghdad for negotiations with Rashid Ali al-Gaylani's government but was detained there after refusing to relinquish temporal authority. He would eventually be exiled to Cyprus.

== Massacres ==
=== Clashes at Dirabun ===
On 21 July 1933, more than 600 Assyrians, led by Yaqo, crossed the border into Syria in hope of receiving asylum from the French Mandate of Syria. They were, however, disarmed and refused asylum, and were subsequently given light arms and sent back to Iraq on 4 August. They then decided to surrender themselves to the Iraqi Army. While crossing the Tigris in the Assyrian village of Dirabun, a clash erupted between the Assyrians and an Iraqi Army brigade. Despite the advantage of heavy artillery, the Iraqis were driven back to their military base in Dirabun. The Assyrians, convinced that the Iraqi army had targeted them deliberately, attacked an army barracks with little success. They were driven back to Syria upon the arrival of Iraqi airplanes. The Iraqi Army lost 33 soldiers during the fighting while the Assyrian irregulars took fewer casualties.

Historians do not agree on who started the clashes at the border. The British Administrative Inspector for Mosul, Lieutenant-colonel R. R. Stafford, wrote that the Assyrians had no intention of clashing with the Iraqis, while the Iraqi historian Khaldun Husry claims that it was Yaqo's men who provoked the army at Dirabun. Husry supported the propaganda rumors, which circulated in the Iraqi nationalist newspapers, of the Assyrians mutilating the bodies of the killed Iraqi soldiers, further enraging the Iraqi public against the Assyrians.

=== Beginning of the massacres ===
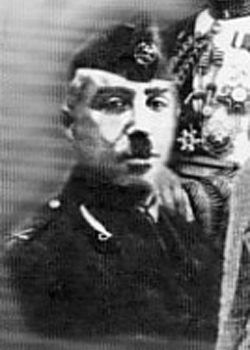
Bakr Sidqi, who led the Iraqi Army during the massacre.

Even though all military activities ceased by 6 August 1933, exaggerated stories of atrocities committed by the Assyrians at Dirabun and anti-Christian propaganda gained currency while rumors circulated that the Christians were planning to blow up bridges and poison drinking water in major Iraqi cities. The Iraqi Army, led by Bakr Sidqi, an experienced brigadier general and Iraqi nationalist, moved north in order to crush the Assyrian revolt. Iraqi troops started executing every Assyrian male found in the mountainous Bekher region between Zakho and Duhok starting from 8 August 1933. Assyrian civilians were transported in military trucks from Zakho and Dohuk to uninhabited places, in batches of eight or ten, where they were shot with machine guns and run over by heavy armoured cars to make sure no one survived.

=== Looting of villages ===
While these killings were taking place, nearby Kurdish, Arab and Yazidi tribes were encouraged to loot Assyrian villages. Kurdish tribes of Gulli, Sindi and Selivani were encouraged by the mayor of Zakho to loot villages to the northeast of Simele. Most women and children from those villages took refuge in Simele and Dohuk.

On 9 August, the Arab tribes of Shammar and Jubur started crossing to the east bank of the Tigris and raiding Assyrian villages on the plains to the south of Dohuk. They were mostly driven by the loss of a large part of their own livestock to drought in the previous years. More than 60 Assyrian villages were looted. While women and children were mostly allowed to take refuge in neighboring villages, men were sometimes rounded up and handed over to the army, by whom they were shot. Some villages were completely burned down and most of them were later inhabited by Kurds.

=== Massacre in Simele ===
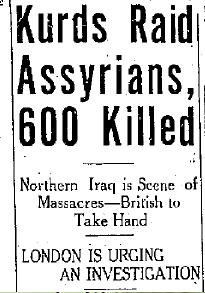
The Lethbridge Herald, 18 August 1933

The town of Simele became the last refuge for Assyrians fleeing from the looted villages. The mayor of Zakho arrived with a military force on 8 and 9 August to disarm the city. During that time thousands of refugees flocked around the police post in the town, where they were told by officials that they would be safe under the Iraqi flag. 10 August saw the arrival of Kurdish and Arab looters who, undeterred by the local police, took away the freshly cut wheat and barley. During the night of 10–11 August, the Arab inhabitants of Simele joined the looting. The Assyrian villagers could only watch as their Arab neighbors drove their flocks before them.

On 11 August the villagers were ordered to leave the police post and return to their homes, which they began to do with some reluctance. As they were heading back Iraqi soldiers in armoured cars arrived, and the Iraqi flag flying over the police post was pulled down. Without warning or obvious provocation, the troops began to fire indiscriminately into the defenseless Assyrians. Ismael Abbawi Tohalla, the commanding officer, then ordered his troops not to target women.

Stafford described the ensuing massacre:

A cold blooded and methodical massacre of all the men in the village then followed, a massacre which for the black treachery in which it was conceived and the callousness with which it was carried out, was as foul a crime as any in the blood stained annals of the Middle East. The Assyrians had no fight left in them, partly because of the state of mind to which the events of the past week had reduced them, largely because they were disarmed. Had they been armed it seems certain that Ismail Abawi Tohalla and his bravos would have hesitated to take them on in fair fight. Having disarmed them, they proceeded with the massacre according to plan. This took some time. Not that there was any hurry, for the troops had the whole day ahead of them. Their opponents were helpless and there was no chance of any interference from any quarter whatsoever. Machine gunners set up their guns outside the windows of the houses in which the Assyrians had taken refuge, and having trained them on the terror stricken wretches in the crowded rooms, fired among them until not a man was left standing in the shambles. In some other instance the blood lust of the troops took a slightly more active form, and men were dragged out and shot or bludgeoned to death and their bodies thrown on a pile of dead.

In his depiction of the massacre, Mar Shimun states:

Girls were raped and made to march naked before Iraqi commanders. Children were run over by military cars. Pregnant women were bayonetted. Children were flung in the air and pierced on to the points of bayonets. Holy books were used for the burning of the massacred.

On 13 August, Bakr Sidqi moved his troops to Alqosh, where he planned to inflict a further massacre on the Assyrians who found refuge there.

== Targeted villages ==
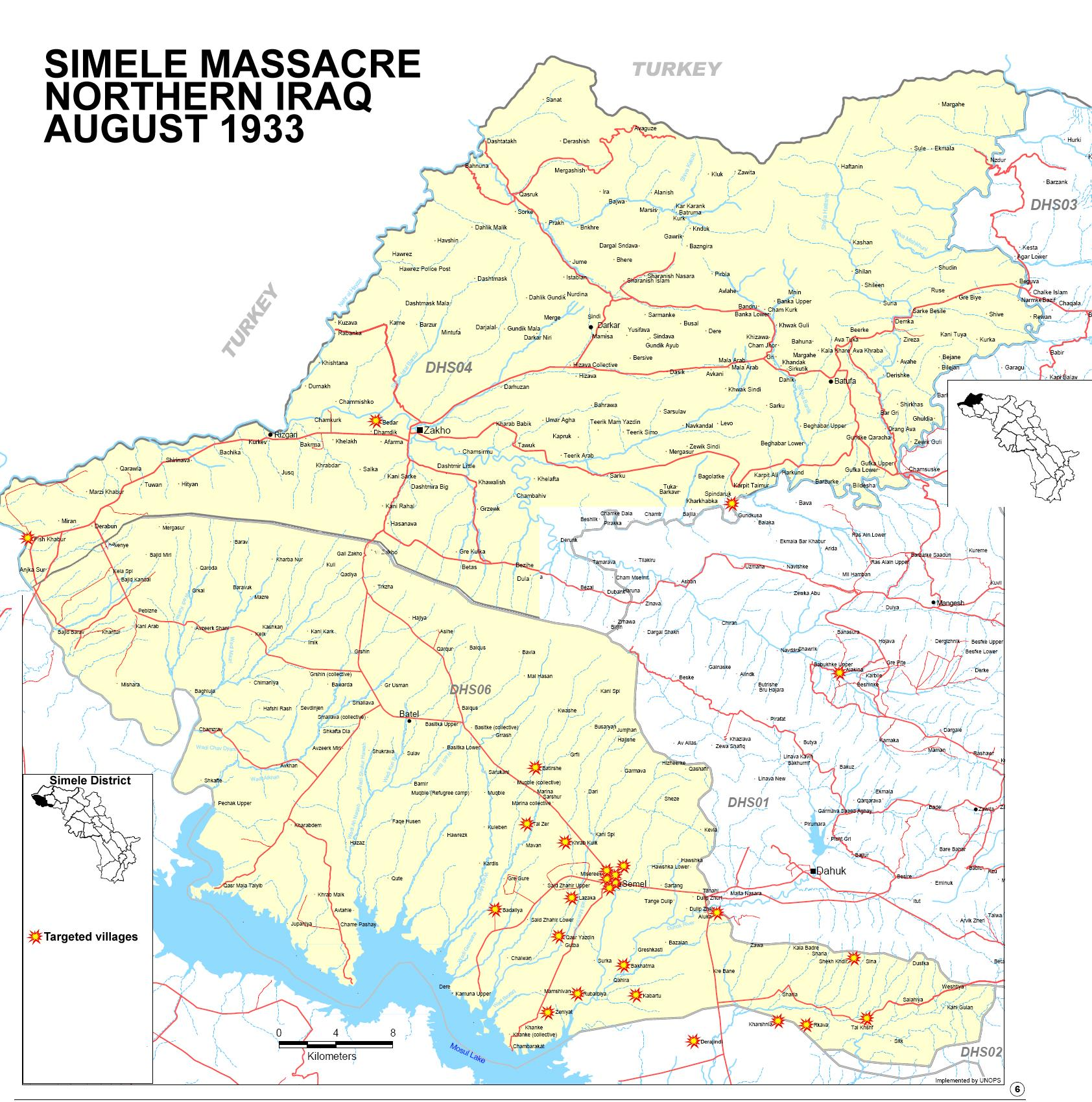
The targeted villages in the Simele and Zakho districts

Targeted villages

- Ala Keena
- Aloka
- Badalliya
- Baderden
- Bagerey
- Bakhitmey
- Bameri
- Barcawra
- Baroshkey
- Basorik
- Bastikey
- Benaringee
- Betafrey
- Betershy
- Bidari
- Biswaya
- Carbeli
- Chem Jehaney
- Dair Kishnik
- Dairke
- Derjendy
- Fishkhabour
- Garvaly
- Gereban
- Gond Naze
- Harkonda
- Idleb
- Kaberto
- Karpel
- Karshen
- Kaserezden
- Kerry
- Khalata
- Kharab Koli
- Kharsheniya
- Kitba
- Korekavana
- Kowashey
- Lazga
- Majel Makhte
- Mansouriya
- Mawani
- Qasr Yazdin
- Rabibyia
- Rekawa
- Sar Shorey
- Sezary
- Shekhidra
- Sidzari
- Sirchuri
- Spendarook
- Tal Zet
- Tel Khish
- Zeniyat

The main campaign lasted until 16 August 1933, but violent raids on Assyrians were being reported up to the end of the month. The campaign resulted in one third of the Assyrian population of Iraq fleeing to Syria.

== Aftermath ==
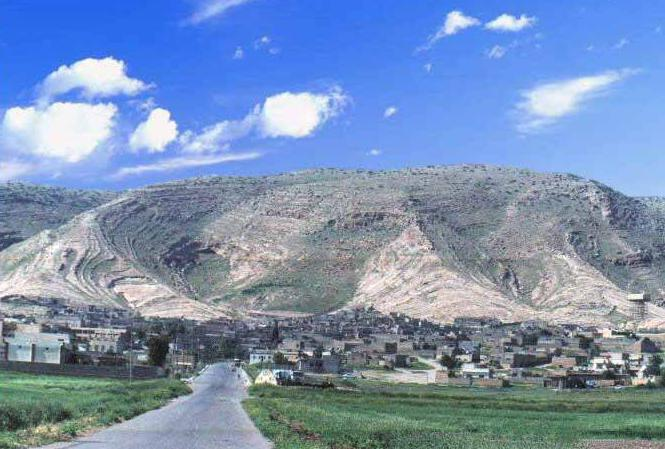
The Assyrian town of Alqosh where a massacre was planned on its population.

On 18 August 1933, Iraqi troops entered Mosul, where they were given an enthusiastic reception by its Muslim inhabitants. Triumphant arches were erected and decorated with melons pierced with daggers, symbolizing the heads of murdered Assyrians. The crown prince Ghazi himself came to the city to award 'victorious' colors to those military and tribal leaders who participated in the massacres and the looting. Anti-Christian feeling was at its height in Mosul, and the Christians of the city were largely confined to their homes during the whole month in fear of further action by the frenzied mob.

The Iraqi Army later paraded in the streets of Baghdad in celebration of its victories. Bakr Sidqi was promoted; he later led Iraq's first military coup and became prime minister.

Immediately after the massacre and the repression of the alleged Assyrian uprising, the Iraqi government demanded a conscription bill. Non-Assyrian Iraqi tribesmen offered to serve in the Iraqi army in order to counter the Assyrians. In late August, the government of Mosul demanded that the central government 'ruthlessly' stamp out the rebellion, eliminate all foreign influence in Iraqi affairs, and take immediate steps to enact a law for compulsory military service. The next week, 49 Kurdish tribal chieftains joined in a pro-conscription telegram to the government, expressing thanks for punishing the 'Assyrian insurgents', stating that a "nation can be proud of itself only through its power, and since evidence of this power is the army," requesting compulsory military service.

Rashid Ali al-Gaylani presented the bill to the parliament. His government fell, however, before conscription was enacted; Jamil al-Midfai's government did so in February 1934.

The massacres and looting had a deep psychological impact on the Assyrians. Stafford reported their low morale upon arrival in Alqosh:

When I visited Alqosh myself on August 21st I found the Assyrians, like the Assyrians elsewhere, utterly panic-stricken. Not only were they disturbed, but their spirit was completely broken. It was difficult to recognize in their cowed demeanour the proud mountaineers whom everyone had known so well and admired so much for the past dozen years.

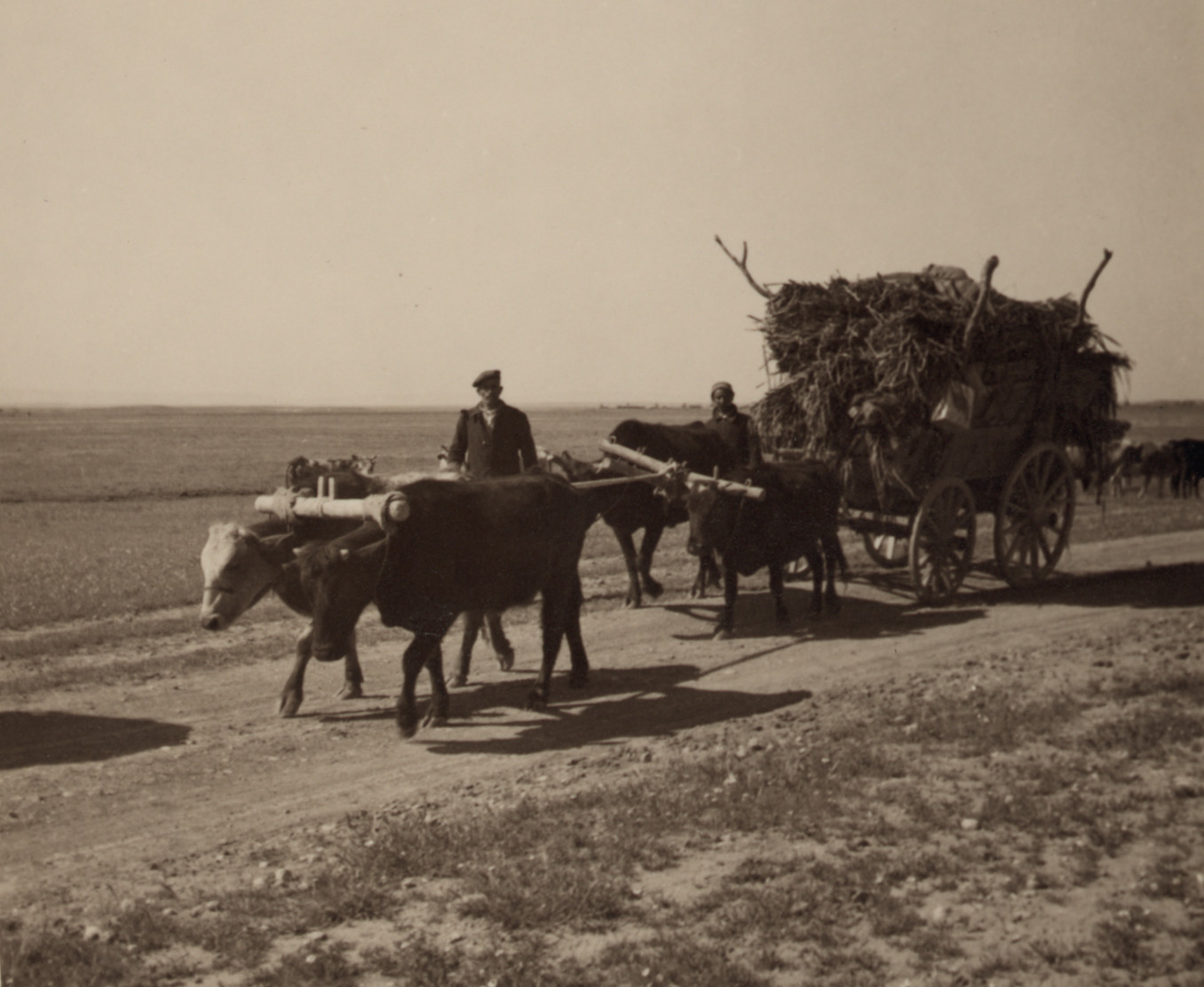
Assyrian refugees on a wagon moving to a newly constructed village on the Khabur River in Syria.

Because of the massacre, around 6,200 Assyrians left the Nineveh Plains immediately for the neighboring French Mandate of Syria, and were later joined by 15,000 refugees the following years. They concentrated in the Jazira region and built a number of villages on the banks of the Khabur River. Over 20,000 Assyrians became refugees in total.

King Faisal, who had recently returned to Iraq from a medical vacation, was under great physical stress during the crisis. His health deteriorated even more during the hot summer days in Baghdad; the British chargé d'affaires described meeting him in his pajamas as he sat in his bed on 15 August, denying that a massacre had been committed in Simele. Faisal left Iraq again on 2 September 1933, seeking a cooler climate in London. He died five days later in Bern, Switzerland.

Mar Shimun, who had been detained since June 1933, was forced into exile along with his extended family, despite initial British reluctance. He was flown on an RAF plane to Cyprus on 18 August 1933, and to the United States in 1949, forcing the head of the Church of the East to relocate to Chicago, where it remained until 2015.

In 1948, Shimun met with the representatives of Iraq, Syria and Iran in Washington, subsequently calling upon his followers to "live as loyal citizens wherever they resided in the Middle East" and relinquishing his role as a temporal leader and the nationalistic role of the church. This left a power vacuum in Assyrian politics that was filled by the Assyrian Universal Alliance in 1968.

The seat of the Assyrian Church of the East remained in the United States even during the times of Patriarch Mar Dinkha IV. Only with the newly consecrated Patriarch Mar Gewargis III in 2015 did the patriarchal seat of the Assyrian Church of the East return to Iraq relocating in Ankawa in north Iraq.

=== Responsibility for the massacres ===
Official British sources estimate the total number of all Assyrians killed during August 1933 at around 600, while Assyrian sources put the figure at several thousands, or 3,000 to 6,000. Contemporary English and American sources also placed the number killed at 3,000. Historians disagree as to who was responsible for ordering the mass killings. Stafford blamed Iraqi nationalists, most prominently Rashid Ali al-Gaylani and Bakr Sidqi. According to him, Iraqi Army officers despised the Assyrians, and Sidqi in particular was vocal in his hatred for them. This view was also shared by British officials who recommended to Faysal not to send Sidqi to the north during the crisis.

According to some historians, the agitation against the Assyrians was also encouraged by Rashid Ali al-Gaylani's Arab nationalist government, which saw it as a distraction from the continuous Shiite revolt in the southern part of the country.

Khaldun Husry, who was close to the Iraqi establishment and is the most well-known minimizer of the Simele massacre, blamed the Assyrians for starting the crisis and absolved Sidqi and most senior Iraqi officials from ordering the mass killing in Simele. He claimed that the violence was not premeditated and that the responsibility lies on the shoulders of Ismael Abbawi, a junior officer in the army. He hinted, but did not state, that Faysal might have been the authority who issued orders to exterminate Assyrian males. Although Husry's article on what he calls the "Assyrian affair" is the most widely cited academic study of the crisis, it has been prominently critiqued by historians of Iraq as an example of anti-Assyrian rhetoric. Close study reveals that it contains many basic flaws and contradictions, having been drawn from a mostly unedited Ph.D. dissertation chapter for publication.

Kanan Makiya, a leftist Iraqi historian, presents the actions taken by the military as a manifestation of the nationalist anti-imperialist paranoia which was to culminate with the Ba'athists ascending to power in the 1960s. Fadhil al-Barrak, an Iraqi Ba'athist historian, credits Sidqi as the author of the whole campaign and the ensuing massacres. For him, the events were part of a history of Iraq prior to the true nationalist revolution.

=== British role ===
Anglo-Iraqi relations entered a short cooling-down period during and after the crisis. The Iraqis had been previously encouraged by the British to detain Patriarch Shimun in order to defuse tensions. The British were also wary of Iraqi military leaders and recommended Sidqi, a senior ethnic Kurdish general who was stationed in Mosul, be transferred to another region due to his open animosity towards the Assyrians. Later, they had to intervene to dissuade Faysal from personally leading a tribal force to punish the Assyrians. The general Iraqi public opinion that the Assyrians were proxies used by the British to undermine the newly established Iraqi state, promoted by newspapers, was also shared by some leading officials, including the prime minister. British and European protests following the massacre only confirmed to them that the "Assyrian rebellion" was the work of European imperialists.

Both King George V and Cosmo Gordon Lang, the Archbishop of Canterbury, took a personal interest in the massacre. British representatives at home demanded from Faysal that Sidqi and other culprits be tried and punished. The massacres were seen in Europe as a jihad against a small Christian minority. In the long term, however, the British government supported Iraq and rejected an international inquiry into the killings, fearing that it would provoke further massacres against Christians in Iraq. They also did not insist on punishing the offenders, who were now seen as heroes by the Iraqi public. The official British stance was to defend the Iraqi government for its perseverance and patience in dealing with the crisis and to attribute the massacres to rogue army units. A report on the battle of Dirabun blames the Assyrians, defends the actions of the Iraqi Army, and commends Sidqi as a good officer.

The change in British attitude towards the Assyrians gave rise to the notion of a "British betrayal" among some Assyrian circles. This charge first surfaced after 1918, when the British did not follow through with their repeated promises to resettle Assyrians where they would be safe following the Assyrian genocide launched by the Ottomans during the First World War.

== Cultural impact and legacy ==
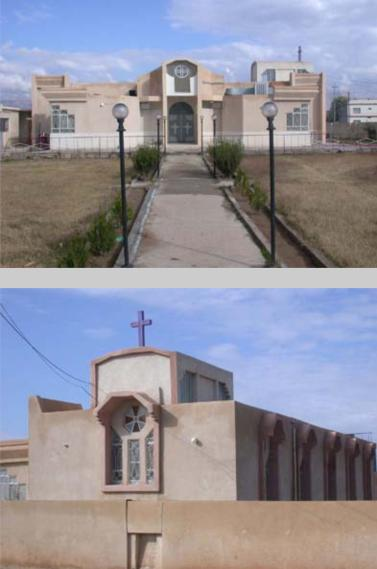
Church of Martyrs – named after the massacre, it stands today in the town of Simele.

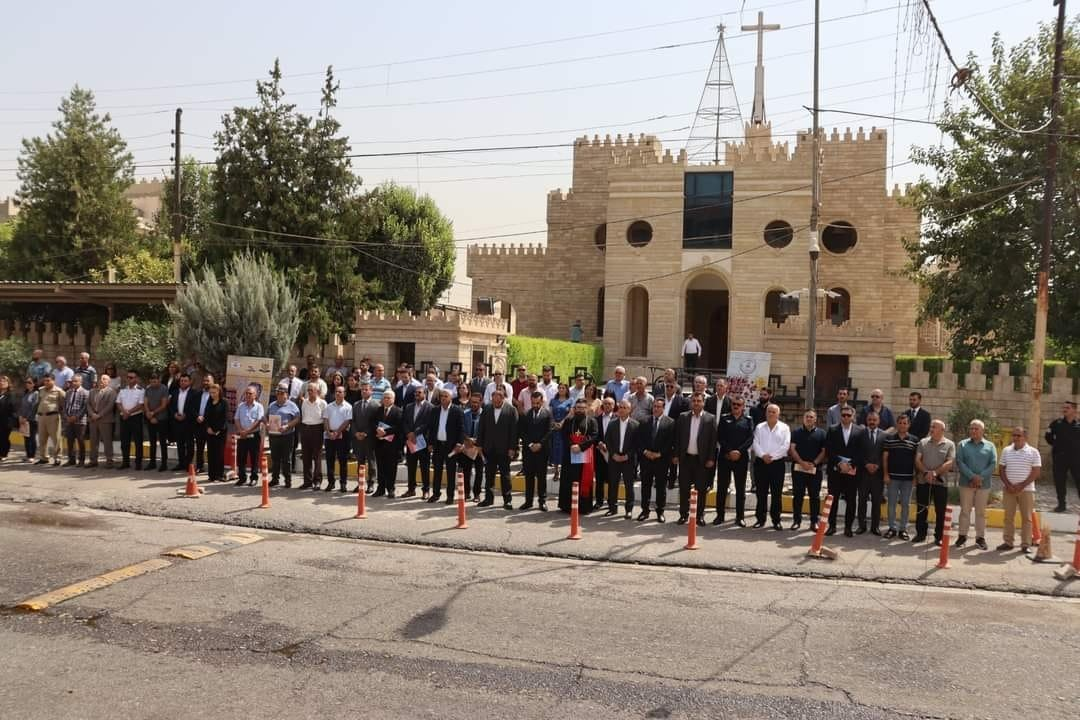
Assyrians in Ankawa commemorating the massacre on Assyrian Martyrs Day, 7 August

The massacre had a deep psychological impact on Assyrians in the new Iraqi state. Namely, Simele massacre is often cited as being a major amplifier for the modern Assyrian naming dispute, amplifying the denominational schisms that Assyrians would face. Following failed negotiations, the Iraqi government exiled Shimun to Cyprus and the COE would relocate its patriarchate to Chicago. At the same time, Chaldean patriarch Mar Yousef VI Emmanuel II Thomas as well as Priest Wadisho of Alqosh and Mor Athanasius Thoma Kassir of Mosul of the Syriac Orthodox Church, had sent letters under duress congratulating Iraqi authorities for suppressing the Assyrian "rebellion".American resident minister and eyewitness Paul Knabenshue related to the U.S. Secretary of State that these letters were most likely written under threat and duress: "The exaction of false testimonials from the various Christian dignitaries, virtually at the point of the pistol, is a sad testimonial to the integrity of the Iraq government". For many Chaldean Catholics and Syriac Orthodox, it was reason enough to be killed just by being Assyrian, so the perceived solution was to deny any affiliation with Assyrian identity and ethnicity.

The massacres also had a deep impact on the newly established Kingdom of Iraq. Kanan Makiya argues that the killing of Assyrians transcended tribal, religious, ideological and ethnic barriers as Sunni Arabs, Shia Arabs, Sunni Kurds, Sunni Turkmen, Shia Turkmen, and Yazidis, as well as Monarchists, Islamists, nationalists, royalists, conservatives, Leftists, federalists, and tribalists, were all united in their anti-Assyrian and anti-Christian sentiments. According to him, the pogrom was "the first genuine expression of national independence in a former Arab province of the Ottoman Empire" and that the killing of Assyrian Christians was seen as a national duty.

The British were standing firmly behind the leaders of their former colony during the crisis, despite the popular animosity in Iraq towards them. Brigadier General E. H. Headlam of the British military mission in Baghdad was quoted saying "the government and people have good reasons to be thankful to Colonel Bakr Sidqi".

The Simele massacre continues to remain integral to the understanding of modern Assyrian identity, as the memory of persecution still holds strong within descendants of survivors and the general Assyrian people today. Shlimon Bet Shmuel, an Assyrian artist from Iraq, sang a song publicly about the Simele massacre in 1973, which would lead to his exile to Tehran. Shlimon had performed the song during the third anniversary of the Assyrian Cultural Club in Baghdad, and was identified as a nationalistic singer by the Ba'athist government of Iraq. Shlimon's song stands out as one of many different poems and stories that have been written about the massacre since 1933, with other's such as William Saroyan's Seventy Thousand Assyrians also gaining recognition.

The events of Simele are said to have influenced Raphael Lemkin in his coining of the term genocide when devising initial provisions to prevent such crimes from occurring again. In the Assyrian community worldwide, 7 August has officially become known as Assyrian Martyrs Day, also known as the National Day of Mourning, in memory for the Simele massacre, declared so by the Assyrian Universal Alliance in 1970. While the day is usually commemorated to remembering the massacre, it has since been extended to apply to other events such as the Assyrian genocide. In 2004, the Ba'athist Syrian government banned an Assyrian political organization from commemorating the event and threatened arrests if any were to break the ban.

A resolution introduced in the U.S. House of Representatives on 24 September 2015 (H.Res.440) referred to the Simele massacre, stating that more than 3,000 Assyrians had been killed in 1933. It also noted that many Assyrians from the Khabur region of Syria were descendants of those who had fled Iraq following the massacre and settled along the Khabur River. The resolution was not adopted and died at the end of the congressional session.
