= Simele =

Town in Iraq

Simele سێمێل
- Town
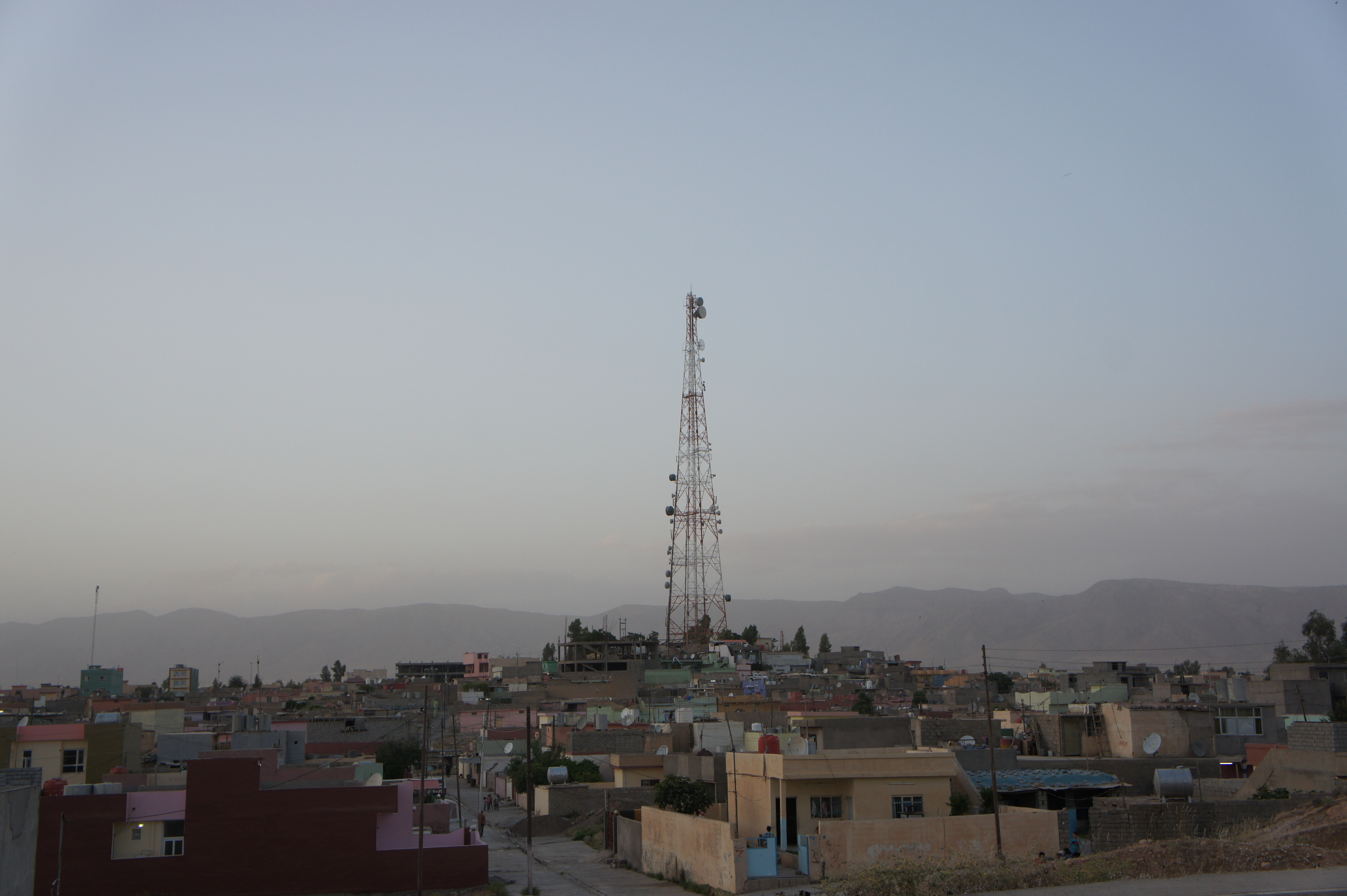
- Semel in 2012

- Location in Iraq Simele (Iraq)
- Coordinates: 36°51′30″N 42°51′0″E
- Country: Iraq
- Autonomous region: Kurdistan Region
- Governorate: Dohuk Governorate

Population (2018)
  - Total: 71,557

Simele or Semel (Kurdish: سێمێل, romanized: Sêmêl, Arabic: سميل, Syriac: ܣܡܠܐ) is a town located in the Dohuk province of Kurdistan Region in Iraq. The town is on the main road that connects the Kurdistan Region to its neighbor Turkey. It is 14 km (8.7 mi) west of Dohuk. The town had a population of 71,557 in July 2018.

== Information ==
In 1849, British traveler Austen Henry Layard described Simele as a Yazidi village “crowned with a mud-built castle,” and recorded meeting a Yazidi chieftain named Abde Agha there.

Simele was populated by Armenian and Assyrian refugees fleeing massacres during the Assyrian and Armenian genocides. During the Simele massacre in 1933, around three thousand Assyrians were massacred prompting many to flee the country as a consequence. The main Assyrian tribe in Simele at the time was Baz.

In 2011, the population was mostly Kurdish with a small Assyrian minority of 635 people. Around half of the Assyrian minority adhere to the Assyrian Church of the East. A small Armenian minority still exists in the town.
