= Muhammad Husayn Kashif al-Ghita' =

Grand Ayatollah Sheikh Muhammad-Husayn Kashif al-Ghita'
- الشيخ محمد حسين كاشف الغطاء

Personal life
- Born: 1877 Najaf, Iraq
- Died: July 19, 1954 (aged 76–77) Kerend, Kermanshah, Iran
- Resting place: Wadi-us-Salaam
- Parent: Sheikh Ali Kashif al-Ghita' (father)
- Main interest(s): Islamic philosophy, Usul al-fiqh

Religious life
- Religion: Islam

Grand Ayatollah Sheikh Muhammad-Husayn Kashif al-Ghita' (b. Najaf, 1877; d. Karand, 1954) was a Shiite jurist, philosopher, author, teacher, and lecturer. He was considered to be one of the highest ranking scholars in Iraq, yet less popular. He worked for the welfare of the Shia community in Iraq and for Sunni-Shia rapprochement and solidarity.

== Early life and education ==
Kashif al-Ghita' was born to Sheikh Ali Kashif al-Ghita' in Najaf in 1877. He hails from a long line of illustrious Shia jurists.

He studied in the Islamic seminaries of Najaf, under grand scholars such as Mirza Husayn Nuri, Mulla Reza Hamadani (d. 1904), Mirza Ḥusayn Ḵalili (d. 1908), Sheikh Mohammad-Kazem Khorasani, and Sayyid Mohammed Kazem Yazdi.

== Works ==
Kashif al-Ghita' wrote nearly 80 books on religious sciences such as jurisprudence, authority and hadith. Some of them include:

- Daʿwat al-Eslāmiya elā maḏhab al-Emāmiya [An Islamic invitation to the Imami School]. 4 volumes.
- Tawżiḥ fi bayān mā howa al-Enjil wa mā howa al-Masiḥ [A clarification on what the Bible is, and who Jesus was]
- Aṣl al-Šiʿa wa oṣulohā [The origin of Shiʿite Islam and its principles]. This book was translated to Persian by Sheikh Naser Makarem Shirazi, titled, This is our school.
- al-Āyāt al-bayyenāt [Clear signs].
- al-Moṯol al-ʿolyā fi’l-Eslām, lā fi Beḥamdun [The supreme ideals are to be found in Islam, not at Bhamdun].
- Al Ardh wa al-Torbah Al Husayniyyah [The ground and dust of Imam Husayn].

== Death ==
Kashif al-Ghita' died in Kerend on July 19, 1954. He was buried in the Wadi-us-Salaam cemetery in Najaf.
