= People's Army (Syria) =

Neo-Ba'athist militia in Syria

- الجيش الشعبي
- Dates active: 1967–2024
- Ideology: Neo-Ba'athism; Assadism (from 1971)
- Political position: Far-left
- Size: 250,000 (1971)
- Wars: Islamist uprising in Syria; Syrian civil war

The People's Army (also known as the al-Jaysh al-Sha'bi, Syrian People's Army or People's Militia) was a party-affiliated popular armed organization in Ba'athist Syria, formed in 1963. The People's Army specialized in guerrilla warfare and was intended to defend Syria in the event of a military invasion by another country. The Ministry of Defense also published a political and military journal with the same name (primarily known for its controversial article called "The Path to Creation of the New Arab Man").

== History ==
=== Formation ===
Upon coming to power in 1963, the Ba'ath Party immediately recognized the need to gain support from at least some significant segment of the population, and therefore it carried out ideological mobilization by forming numerous popular organizations, including the People's Army.

The People's Army was formed in 1963. But, according to other sources, it was formed later, on April 29, 1967, by Legislative Decree No. 43, signed by President Nureddin al-Atassi. The People's Army issued all its members special cards that allowed them to carry weapons. The cards were valid if they bore the signature of the local defense commander. Carrying these cards was mandatory as long as the person was also carrying a weapon. If a card was lost, the person who found it was required to take it to the nearest police station, from where it would be returned to its owner. In 1968, the People's Army conducted large-scale guerrilla maneuvers in Damascus. Even before he came to power, the People's Army came under the control of Defense Minister Hafez al-Assad.

=== Civil war ===
By the start of the Syrian civil war, the militia still existed and participated in battles alongside the government army and Hezbollah.

Issam Zahreddine, commander of the Republican Guard until his assassination, served in the People's Army in the 1980s.

== Role ==
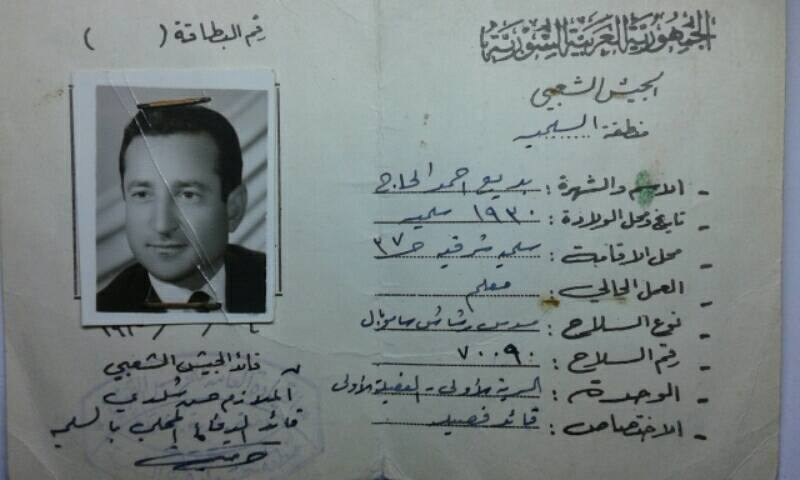
Example of special cards, given to the People's Army members

Like most other Ba'athist paramilitary formations, the People's Army is primarily responsible for internal security (civil defense organization), and its activity outside of Syria is virtually non-existent. Alongside the Workers' Battalions, it was noted that the role of the People's Army was similar to that of the Red Guards in Maoist China during the Cultural Revolution: persecuting and humiliating political opponents of the Ba'ath Party. Party officials very often used the People's Army against their enemies. The militia was used to suppress internal opposition of the government and disperse anti-government demonstrations.

The organization was subordinate to the Ministry of Defense. Initially, until a separate, appropriate position was created, all tasks, the number of personnel, equipment, and rules for joining and participating in the People's Army were determined by the Minister of Defense. The Ba'ath Party itself controlled the activities of the people's army through the so-called "People's Organizations Bureau". The People's Army also had its own separate delegations that visited various countries, for example, visiting Beijing in 1973.

== Compound ==
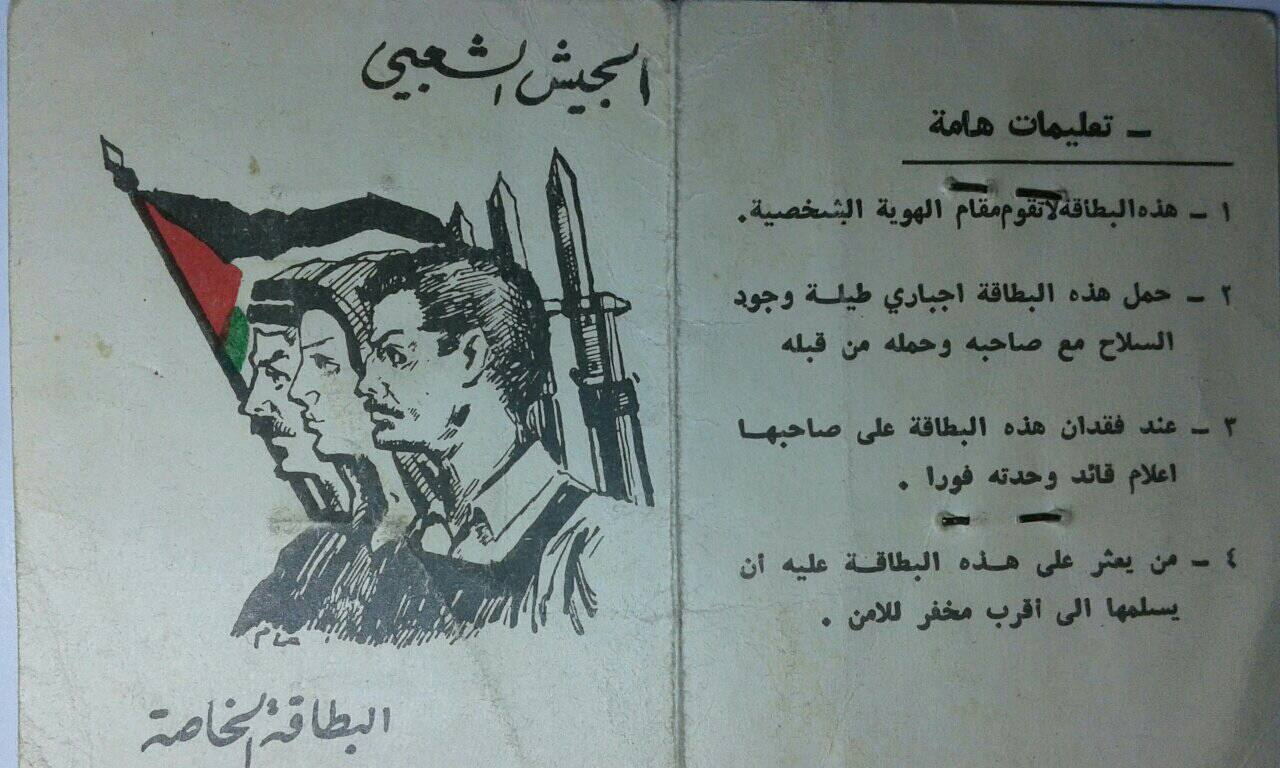
The back of the card contains instructions in case this lost card is found by other person

Anyone could become the commander of units of varying sizes, including ordinary teachers. The People's Army was mainly composed of students and workers. The training of the People's Army was supervised by military instructors from the official armed forces. Members of the People's Army were also subjected to Ba'athist indoctrination. A 1966 document from the Ba'ath Party noted that, in their understanding, the People's Army was also an ideological army, representing (and defending) the interests of Syrian workers and peasants.

In 1964, the commander of the People's Army was appointed, an old Ba'athist general named Ibrahim Muhammad Ali: as of 1986, he still held this position and was re-elected to the Central Committee of the Ba'ath Party after the 1985 Regional Congress.

According to some reports, the regular strength of the People's Army in 1970 was 250,000 people. For comparison, the size of the official army in the same year was three times smaller. It was stated that in 2012 the size of the People's Army was only 100,000 militiamen.

== See also ==
- National Guard of the Ba'ath Party
- Workers' Battalions (Syria)
