= National Guard of the Ba'ath Party =

Ba'athist militia in Syria

National Guard
- الحرس الوطني
- Leaders: Hamad Ubayd; Muhammad Ibrahim Ali
- Founded: March, 1963
- Dissolved: January, 1966
- Ideology: Ba'athism; Anti-Zionism factions: Qutriyun; Neo-Ba'athism
- Political position: Left-wing factions: Far-left
- Status: Disbanded
- Size: 25,000
- Wars: July 1963 Syrian coup attempt; 1964 Hama riot

The National Guard of the Ba'ath Party (also sometimes called Ba'ath Party Militia) was an armed militia in Syria, created by Military Committee after 1963 coup d'etat to defend the regime. The Guard was directly subordinate to the National Council for the Revolutionary Command (ruling council set up by the Military Committee). At the time, Ba'athist Iraq also had its own National Guard, similar in its functions. In addition to this National Guard, Syria also had a "Red National Guard," controlled by Abd al-Karim al-Jundi until his suicide in 1969.

== Formation and history ==
National Guard was formed in March 1963, short after the Ba'athist seizure of power. The reason for its formation, as reported, was the Ba'ath party's distrust of the traditional army, which suffered from ideological divisions and had already been responsible for numerous coups in the past. By early October 1963, it was stated that the size of the Guard was approximately 25,000 militiamen. The Guard also possessed a number of tanks and artillery systems.

=== July 1963 Syrian coup attempt ===
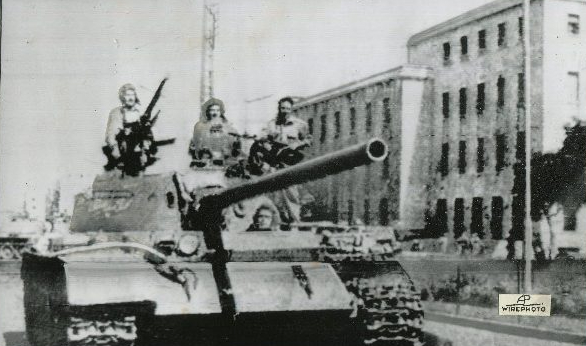
National Guard tank after July 1963 coup attempt

The National Guard was not a significant military force, and its training, supervised by officers of the regular army, was mostly limited to what was necessary to suppress protests or rebellions. However, the National Guard performed well in suppressing the Nasserist coup attempt in July 1963, serving as the main force defending the government.

=== 1964 Hama riot ===
In addition to fighting the forces of the conspirators, the guard also ensured compliance with the previously imposed curfew. The Guard also participated in suppressing the 1964 Hama riots by the Muslim Brotherhood: in early stages, militants hunted the Ba'ath Party and National Guard members, for example, they killed and mutilated Guard member Munzir al-Shimali. In a result of those assassinations, the National Guard was at the forefront of suppressing the rebellion: president Amin al-Hafiz viewed this as a provocation that he needed, and ordered the guard to launch a massive offensive on Hama, putting the riots down in just two days.

== Role ==
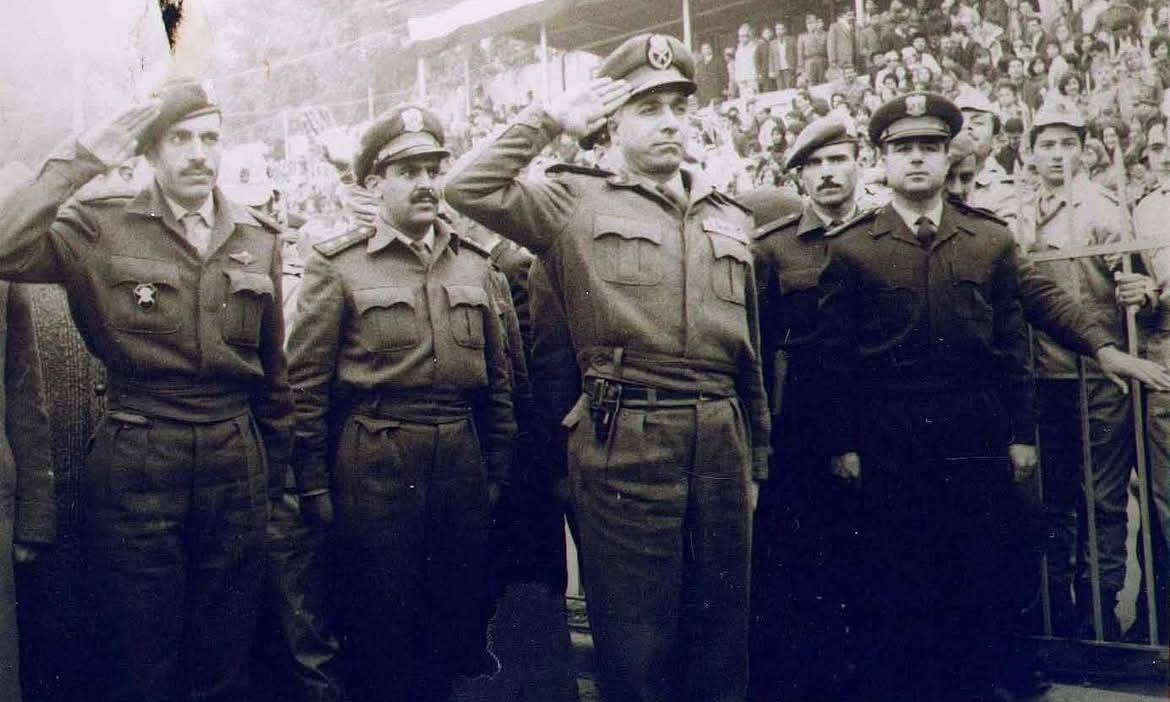
Syrian President Amin al-Hafiz before a military parade, to his right is his assistant Lieutenant Mustafa al-Issa, and to his left is Captain Muhammad Ibrahim Ali, commander of the National Guard

The National Guard served primarily as an instrument of political pressure and played an important role in the political control of the population. Most of its members were extremely radical pro-Ba'athists and people loyal to the ruling party, who actively participated in intimidating its opponents. The formation of the guard also led to the radicalization of the official army. During its existence, the guard played the role of an "ideological army" - a concept that originated after the Sixth party congress in October 1963, and which continued to be implemented (directly in relation to the army) even after the disbandment of the Guard. The National Guard also participated in the formation of the early Workers' Battalions.

The National Guard was formed primarily from peasants and other armed civilians. The Guard received orders to eliminate any suspected enemies of the Ba'athist revolution in Syria, to suppress protests and strikes by merchants and craftsmen whose property was threatened by government nationalization policies (a major wave of which began in January 1965 with the adoption of the so-called Ramadan Socialist Decrees). The guard was commanded by Ibrahim Muhammad Ali, who also commanded the People's Army.

== Disbandment ==
The Guard was disbanded in January 1966 by orders of the Prime Minister Salah al-Din al-Bitar and president Amin al-Hafiz because it had become the main military and political support base for the radical neo-Ba'athists and the Qutriyun faction in the Ba'ath Party (such as Salah Jadid) and posed a serious threat to the moderate government. However, this did not prevent the coup that took place in February 1966. Almost all of the former members of the guard supported Jadid.

== See also ==
- Workers' Battalions (Syria)
- People's Army (Syria)
