= Jassem Alwan =

Syrian politician (1928–2018)

Lieutenant Colonel Jassem Alwan
- جاسم علوان
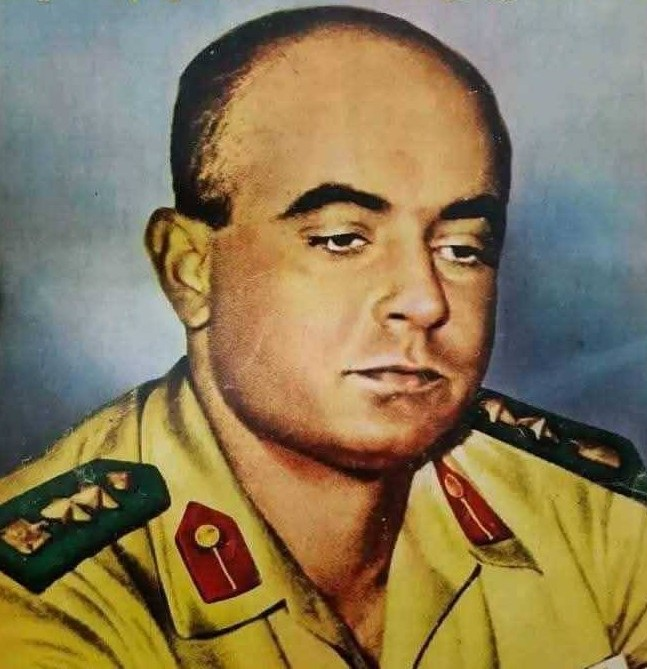
- Alwan portrait on the magazine cover

Personal details
- Born: 4 July 1928 Deir ez-Zor, French Syria
- Died: 3 January 2018 (aged 89) Cairo, Egypt

Military service
- Allegiance: First Syrian Republic (1946–1950); Second Syrian Republic (1950–1958); United Arab Republic (1958–1961); Second Syrian Republic (1961-1963) (Ba'athist Syria) Syrian Arab Republic (1963)
- Branch/service: Syrian Arab Army
- Years of service: 1946–1963
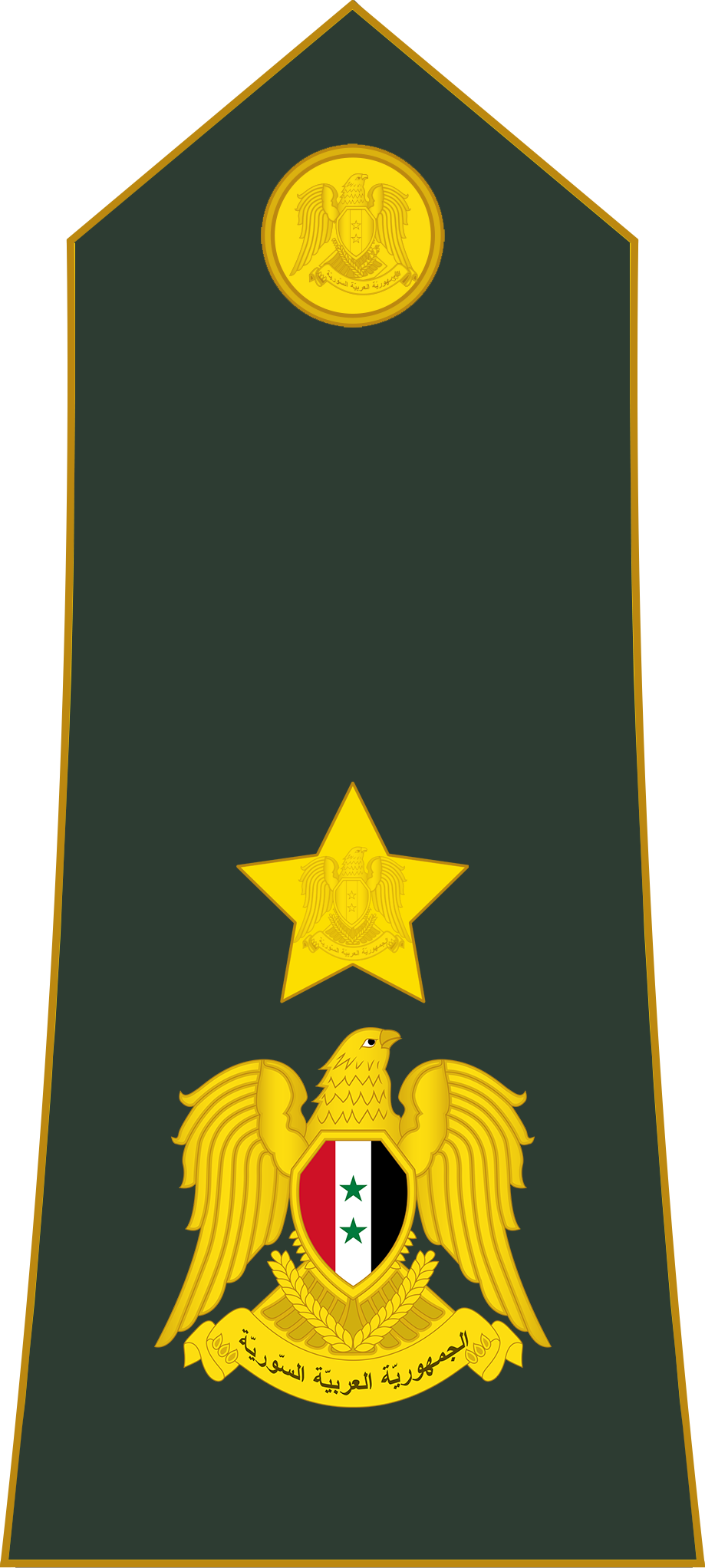
- Rank: Lieutenant Colonel
- Commands: Commander of Qatana Military Base (1958-1961)
- Battles/wars: 1948 Arab-Israeli War

Jassem Alwan (Arabic: جاسم علوان, Jāsim ʿAlwān; 4 July 1928 – 3 January 2018) was a Syrian military officer and prominent military figure in Syria in the early 1960s. He rose to prominence during the period of the United Arab Republic (UAR) when he served as the Commander of the Qatana Base near Damascus. Alwan, a staunch supporter of UAR President Gamal Abdel Nasser, opposed Syria's secession from the union in 1961, leading two failed coup attempts to overthrow the secessionist government in 1962.

He participated in the Baathist-led 8 March coup that toppled President Nazim al-Qudsi in 1963, but after a Baathist attempt to purge Nasserist officers from the military, Alwan led an insurrection against the new government. It failed, and resulted in Alwan's imprisonment and sentencing to death until he was released in 1964 upon the intervention of Nasser and other Arab presidents. Alwan's aborted counter-coup was a significant episode leading to the deterioration of ties between the governments of Egypt and Syria. From then on, Alwan lived in Egypt where he continued his activism against the Baathist government until he returned to Syria in 2005.

== Early life and career ==
Alwan was born to a Sunni Muslim Arab family of Bedouin origins in 1928 in the city of Deir ez-Zor, located along the Euphrates River in eastern Syria. After studying for a period at the Homs Military Academy, Alwan joined the Syrian Army in 1946. During the presidency of Adib al-Shishakli, Alwan had been teaching at the academy. According to Alwan, Shishakli had personally urged him to show preference for up and coming officers from Arab, Sunni Muslim background and to keep the number of ethnoreligious minorities in the graduating class to an "absolute minimum", a request Alwan rejected. Student officers who attended his class included prominent future military figures, such as President Hafez al-Assad, and generals Ali Aslan and Muhammad Nabhan, all of whom were Alawites. Throughout the 1950s, Alwan had been involved in the Arab nationalist movement spearheaded by Egyptian president Gamal Abdel Nasser.

== Military career ==
=== Commander of Qatana Base ===
When Syria and Egypt merged to form the United Arab Republic (UAR) in 1958, Alwan became a high-ranking officer in the army, serving in the position of commander of the Qatana Base, located outside of Damascus. He was promoted to lieutenant colonel in 1961. On 28 September 1961, a military coup in Syria resulted in the dissolution of the union with Egypt. Alwan had not been at his base on that day, instead participating in a mission in Damascus city. Tank units officially under his command played an important role during the coup as they headed north towards Damascus to link up with other mutineers from the Dumayr base before taking the capital. However, the Qatana units acted without Alwan's knowledge, and he consequently blamed himself for the coup's success, concluding that he could have prevented it had he taken up his post in Qatana.

=== Opposition to secession ===
Alwan opposed the secessionist government of President Nazim al-Kudsi, which gained power following the coup, but the authorities did not arrest or purge him for fear of being accused of betraying the still-popular cause of Arab nationalism represented by Nasser, of whom Alwan was a staunch ally. Soon after the secession, a loose coalition of Nasserist officers led by Alwan and members of the Arab Nationalist Movement (ANM), Baathist officers led by the Military Committee and politically independent unionist officers led by Ziad al-Hariri was formed to remove Kudsi's administration and install a pro-union government. While the unionist coup was planned for 2 April 1962, the Nasserist officers under Alwan's leadership made their move on 31 March, launching the revolt from the army garrison in Homs. However, no other army units joined in to back the uprising, resulting in its quick end. A divided military and an unstable political situation prevented the government from pursuing decisive action against the coup officers. Instead, on 1 April, an agreement to between the military factions to deal with the coup participants peacefully was devised in Homs, whereby Abd al-Karim al-Nahlawi (the officer who staged the secessionist coup, but soon after joined the pro-unionist officers), Alwan and a small number of officers loyal to them would be exiled.

The 1 April proposal was rejected outright by Alwan who proceeded to encourage his independent and Baathist allies in the officer corps to move ahead with the original coup plan. Thus, on 2 April, officers Alwan, Muhammad Umran and Hamad Ubayd led the insurrection in Homs and Aleppo, while Lu'ay al-Atassi led the revolt in Deir ez-Zor. The flag of the UAR was raised over the Citadel of Aleppo and the unionist officers broadcast a request for Egyptian military intervention to aid their uprising. Most of the Baathist officers, particularly those stationed in al-Suwayda (led by Salah Jadid) and the Israeli front, refrained from backing the coup at the last minute, fearing the consequences of a quick reunification with the UAR and suspicious of Alwan's intentions based on his earlier coup attempt. Although, the Ba'ath Party was dissolved by Nasser during the UAR period and its leadership had initially supported Syria's secession, Baathist officers openly supported reunification efforts. However, their withdrawal from the planned coup revealed the conflicting feelings among the Baathists towards the reestablishment of the UAR, with many still opposed to an unconditional union with Nasser. As a consequence of the Baathist pull-out, Alwan's uprising failed once more and he was subsequently exiled to Lebanon.

=== Coup d'etat of 1963 and counter coup ===
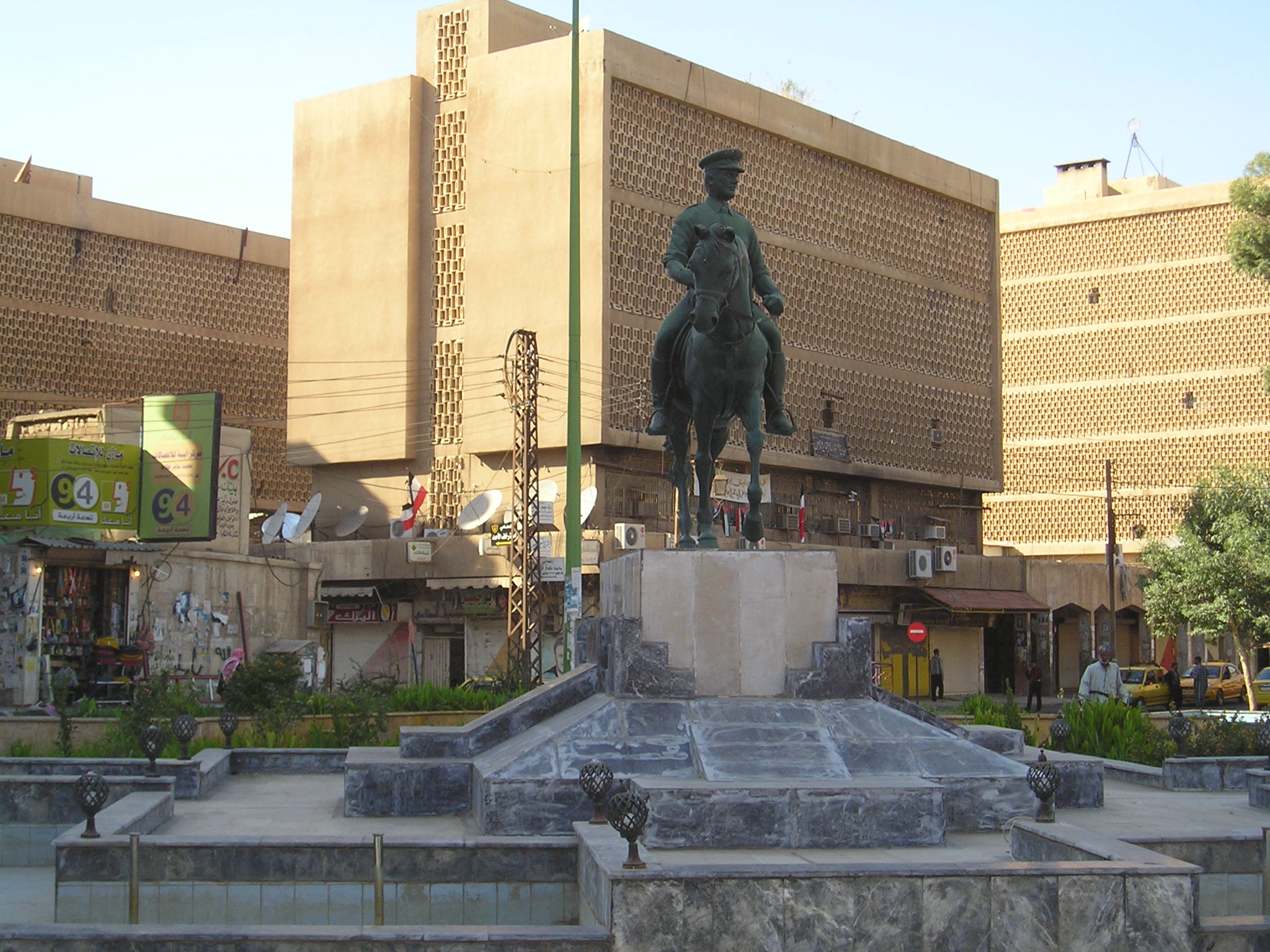
a monument to Alwan in his native Deir ez-Zor

A pan-Arabist coalition of officers led by the Ba'athists and joined by the Nasserists, including Alwan, managed to successfully overthrow the government in Damascus on 8 March 1963, establishing the National Council for the Revolutionary Command (NCRC) —a body dominated by Ba'athists, but also including several Nasserists—to temporarily govern the country. On 17 April a unity agreement between Egypt, Iraq and Syria was signed, stipulating a federal system with Nasser as president. Weeks later, dozens of Nasserist officers were purged by the Ba'athists, and the Nasserist members of the government consequently resigned. At this time, Alwan, disappointed that the Military Committee was neither interested in a genuine power-sharing agreement nor having Nasser preside over Syria, initiated plans with the ANM and Egyptian intelligence officers to remove the Baathist government.

Despite the purges and resignations, Nasserist officers still maintained a relatively strong position in the military, and on 18 July, Alwan, who had since returned from exile, led his third coup attempt. His forces launched daytime assaults on the Army General Headquarters and the broadcast station in Damascus. The Baathist Interior Minister Amin al-Hafiz personally defended the army headquarters and the ensuing battle resulted in hundreds of casualties, including several civilian bystanders. Eventually pro-Baathist units and the party's National Guard quelled the rebellion.

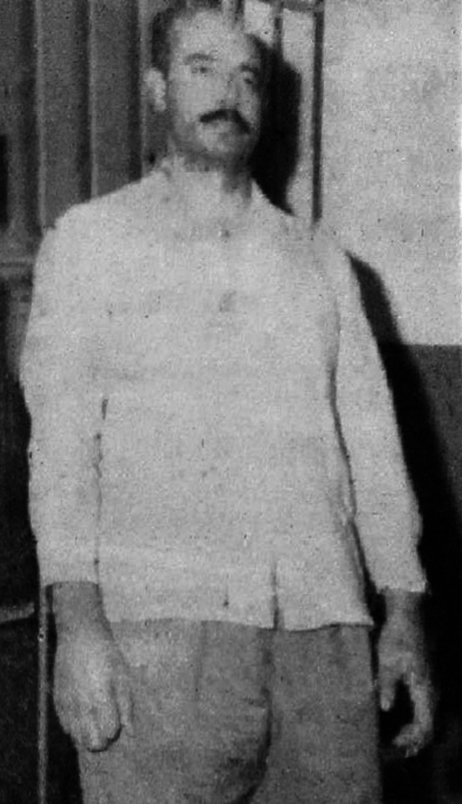
Alwan during his military trial for his attempt to overthrow Military Committee in 1963

Alwan's operation ended in major bloodshed and at least 27 participating officers were arrested and executed. Alwan and his deputy, Colonel Raef al-Maarri, evaded the authorities and went into hiding in the Ghouta countryside of Damascus. Their safe house was eventually discovered and besieged by security forces and both men were arrested and taken to Mezzeh Prison. Alwan refused to testify in the military tribunal, and the court found him guilty of treason and sentenced him to death, along with al-Maarri, Captain Muhammad al-Nabhan and 16 Palestinians, who were also alleged participants in the failed coup. The death sentences were commuted on 10 December to life imprisonment. Alwan was imprisoned for less than a year, before intervention on his behalf by Nasser, President Abd al-Salam Arif of Iraq, President Houari Boumediene of Algeria and President Josip Broz Tito of Yugoslavia resulted in his release on 5 December. Alwan, al-Maarri, al-Nabhan and the co-accused Palestinian participants were exiled and three days later were escorted to the border with Lebanon, from which they headed to Egypt's embassy in Beirut.

The failure of Alwan's revolt marked the end of significant Nasserist influence in Syria's military and civilian institutions and with the pro-Nasser forces largely defeated, the Military Committee of the Ba'ath Party became the sole power center of the country.

== Exile in Egypt and return to Syria ==
Alwan was given asylum in Egypt by Nasser where he continued his activities against the Baathist government in Syria. He became Secretary-General of the Arab Socialist Union's Syrian branch (ASU). Later, after Amin al-Hafiz, who had succeeded Lu'ay al-Atassi as president, was overthrown by a regionalist faction (known as Qutriyun) of the Ba'ath Party (as opposed to the pan-Arabist faction to which Hafiz belonged) led by Salah Jadid and Hafez al-Assad in February 1966, Alwan eventually joined Hafiz, his former enemy, to establish a diverse coalition of dissidents opposed to the ruling Baathists of Syria.

In 1982, Syrian dissidents formed an opposition coalition in Paris, France called the National Alliance for the Liberation of Syria (NALS). The coalition included independents, Arab nationalist groups, such as Alwan's ASU and Hafiz's Iraq-based Syrian Ba'ath Party as well as the Muslim Brotherhood's Syrian faction and the Islamic Front led by Sheikh Abdul Fatah Abu Ghuda. They were financially supported by President Saddam Hussein of Iraq. In November 1984, Alwan attended a conference of the Palestinian National Council (PNC), leading a delegation of 13 NALS coalition members. Most of the group's activities centered on attempts to de-legitimize the government of President Hafez al-Assad, who had ascended to the presidency in a 1970 coup.

Iraqi funding for the dissident coalition's members in Egypt, like Alwan, ended as a result of Egyptian president Hosni Mubarak's participation in the Gulf War against Iraq in 1991. The honorary status and the diplomatic passport Alwan held in Egypt were subsequently cancelled, but he continued to live in Cairo. Alwan eventually returned to Syria in April 2005, during the presidency of Bashar al-Assad, after personal intervention by former Syrian defense minister, Mustafa Tlass. Tlass wrote in his memoirs that he had disagreed with the revocation of Alwan's civil rights, as well as the rights of other exiled dissidents. Alwan was greeted ceremoniously at the Damascus International Airport and was then escorted to the Cham Hotel in the city. According to anti-government activists, Syrian security forces raided Alwan's home in Deir ez-Zor on 9 August 2011, during the Syrian Civil War.

== Bibliography ==
- Ismael, Tareq Yousif (1998). The Communist Movement in Syria and Lebanon. University Press of Florida. ISBN 0813016312.
- Moubayed, Sami M. (2006). Steel & Silk: Men and Women who shaped Syria 1900–2000. Cune Press. ISBN 978-1885942418.
- Mufti, Malik (1996). Sovereign Creations: Pan-Arabism and Political Order in Syria and Iraq. Cornell University Press. ISBN 0801431689. "Alwan Syria 1962."
- Oron, Yitzhak (1961). Middle East Record. Vol. 2. The Moshe Dayan Center.
- Petran, Tabitha (1972). Syria. Ernest Benn Limited. ISBN 978-0-510-38905-5. "Jasim Alwan."
- Rabinovich, Itamar (1972). Syria Under the Baʻth, 1963-66: The Army Party Symbiosis. Transaction Publishers. ISBN 0706512669.
- Itamar Rabinovich, ed. (1987). Middle East Contemporary Survey. Vol. 4. The Moshe Dayan Center. ISBN 9780813374451.
- Seale, Patrick (1990). Asad of Syria: The Struggle for the Middle East. University of California Press. ISBN 978-0520069763.
- Simon, Reeva S.; Mattar, Phillip; Bulliet, Richard W. (1996). The encyclopedia of the modern Middle East. Vol. 1, A–C. Macmillan Publishing Company, Incorporated. ISBN 9780028970615.
- Van Dam, Nikolaos (1996). The struggle for power in Syria: politics and society under Asad and the Baʻth Party. I. B. Tauris. ISBN 9781860640247.
