= July 1963 Syrian coup attempt =

Nasserist coup attempt in Syria

- Part of the Arab Cold War
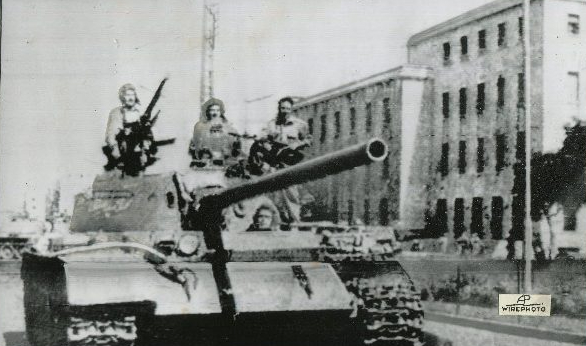
- Tank of the National Guard of the Ba'ath Party on the Damascus Square after the failed coup attempt
Date	July 18, 1963
Location	Damascus, Syria
Result	Coup failed: The ruling Military Committee suppresses the uprising; Continued purges of Nasserists

Belligerents
Nasserist groups Arab Nationalist Movement; Supported by: United Arab Republic	Ba'ath Party: Military Committee

Commanders and leaders
Jassem Alwan; Raef al-Maarri; Mohammed Nabhan	Amin al-Hafiz; Salah Jadid

Units involved
Unknown	National Guard of the Ba'ath Party

Strength
- 400–700

Casualties and losses
- 40-70 killed and 300 wounded 27 executed after coup

On 18 July 1963, Nasserist officers in Syria unsuccessfully attempted to seize power from the Military Committee of the Ba'ath Party. The coup attempt had resulted in the killing dozens to hundreds of people. The coup was led by Colonel Jassem Alwan, who had previously attempted to seize power in Syria multiple times. The coup was supported by local branch of Arab Nationalist Movement (ANM) and Egypt, but ultimately failed, and the ruling Ba'ath Party continued to purge Nasserist military and political forces in Syria.

== Background ==
=== 1963 coup d'etat ===
On March 8, 1963, Ba'athists from the Syrian army, under the command of the Military Committee of the Ba'ath Party (created in 1958), launched a coup d'état (that known as March 8 Revolution in Ba'athist historiography), that was successful. The Military Committee, having come to power, began the process of consolidating its power and formed the National Council for the Revolutionary Command to govern the country, as well as the National Guard of the Ba'ath Party - militia formed of Syrian Ba'ath supporters.

=== Purges ===
The Military Committee very quickly began purges against all non-Ba'athist groups (even those that had participated in the coup). In April, Military Committee ordered to purge all Nasserist officers. That led to Nasserist riots even before July 18 coup, but all they was suppressed by the Ba'athist Forces. After April 17, 50 Nasserist officers were dismissed from the army. For example, the Military Committee purged the Nasserist officer Ziad Hariri, who took part in the March 8 Revolution.

Nasserist officer Jassem Alwan soon became disillusioned with the Ba'athist Military Committee and its lack of real desire for unification, despite the April 17 charter signed with Egypt and Iraq, so he began planning a coup d'état with Egyptian intelligence, the Arab Nationalist Movement, and Nasserist elements in the army and party. On the eve of the coup, Alwan, who had already started several uprisings and attempted coups with the aim of restoring unity with Egypt, returned from exile to Syria. Alwan scheduled the coup for 11:00 a.m. on July 18. Egyptian President Gamal Abdel Nasser supported Alwan, because he believed that the position of the Military Committee was strengthening every day, so it was necessary to act quickly.

== Events ==
On July 18, a group of Syrian diplomats (including president Lu'ay al-Atassi) traveled to Cairo to calm the tensions with Egyptian government. This was planned in advance by Nasser. When Nasser learned of the first clashes in Damascus, the meeting began - at which point one of the Egyptian employees handed President Nasser a note stating that a coup d'etat had begun in Syria, which Nasser announced out loud to the Syrian delegates.

Taking advantage of the moment, Jassem Alwan launched an attempted coup, with support of Egyptian intelligence: riots broke out in Damascus on the same day, July 18. Pro-Nasserist troops attacked the army headquarters and radio station and faced fierce fighting from Ba'athist forces. The severity of the fighting was evidenced by the fact that the survivors had to wash the blood off the streets of Damascus for a long time. The reaction of the Military Committee was quite fast, and apparently it already had some intelligence in advance - it almost immediately gave the order to the loyal units of the National Guard to be in combat positions and units to be ready to fight with the forces of the conspirators. The security forces began searching for the organizers of the coup, but it was too late, as they hid in the headquarters.

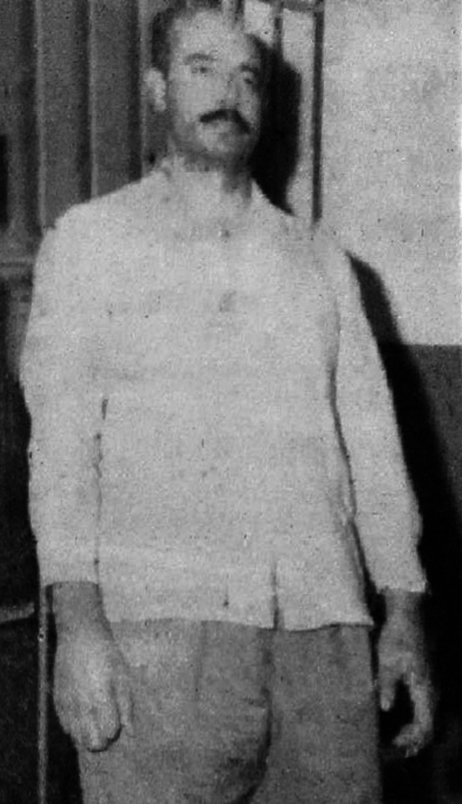
Jassem Alwan

It soon became clear that the coup had failed, but Alwan's attempt to turn defeat into victory continued, leading to bloody clashes with the National Guard. Amin al-Hafiz personally defended the army headquarters. One of the three leaders of the coup, Muhammad Nabhan, was captured by the intelligence services almost immediately after the coup began - the reason was that one of the members of the Military Committee, Salah Jadid, learned that he, being a former captain who had been dismissed, had arrived at the headquarters of the Military Works Services company together with a number of civilians, where they were all given weapons: after this news was double-checked by military intelligence at the request of Jadid, it became clear that it was true, and Nabhan was captured and sent to Mezzeh prison, where he was interrogated by Amin al-Hafiz.

At the same time, armed discharged soldiers and former fedayeen fighters from the now disbanded Palestinian battalion began to gather and organize around the army command building. The fighters attacked the General Staff Guard and the observation company at the radio station building and were repulsed. Soon, Colonel Salah Jadid headed to the military school in Qaboun where he took command of the suppression of this rebellion. As a result of the rapid response of the Military Committee and the organized resistance of the Ba'athist forces, the rebels were soon surrounded and killed or arrested. On the day of the attempted coup, Damascus Radio reminded people that movement on the streets was prohibited due to a curfew under threat of execution, and that martial law would not be lifted, and that any demonstrations, gatherings, and carrying weapons were still strictly prohibited. Damascus radio also broadcast military music and telegrams reporting victories for the Ba'athist government.

== Aftermath ==
After the coup was suppressed, Prime Minister, Salah al-Din al-Bitar made a statement in which he said:

"Today, what we have been waiting for days, even months, has happened - what those who denied, disowned and turned away from the March 8 Revolution did. They turned away from one of the pillars of the triple alliance [Syria-Egypt-Iraq], namely the revolution that destroyed division, separatist apostasy and paved a broad path to unity for our Arab people."

=== Repressions and executions ===
After the suppression of the coup, anti-Ba'athist publications and works began to appear, which emphasizing the sectarian nature of the Ba'athist regime. The Military Committee intensified the terror against Nasserists: shortly after the coup attempt, 27 conspirators were executed instead of being allowed to go into exile, and others were imprisoned. The Committee continued the purges of the Nasserites and eventually they lost all power in Syria. The military court sentenced the three coup leaders (Jassem Alwan, Raef al-Maarri and Mohammed Nabhan) to death and passed the decision on to the NCRC, where the final decision was to be made. Lu'ay al-Atassi, then the chairman of the NCRC, challenged the sentence, but most of the other Ba'athists, having lost hope of resolving the conflict with Egypt, supported the decision of the future chairman, Amin al-Hafiz, who advocated carrying out the executions: Atassi was being held back by the Military Committee's suspicions of his sympathy for the Nasserites. As a loser, Atassi gave up his post as chairman of the NCRC in favor of al-Hafiz at July 27. But, although the three leaders of the coup, Jassem Alwan, Raef al-Maarri and Mohammed Nabhan, were given death sentences, they all were sent into exile on December 5 at the request of Egyptian President Nasser, President Abd al-Salam Arif of Iraq, President Houari Boumediene of Algeria and President Josip Broz Tito of Yugoslavia. 40 people were also released by a military court after their innocence was proven.

On December 5, 1963, Information Minister Sami al-Jundi went on the radio to announce that the NCRC had commuted the sentences of some of the coup plotters (saying that they had been "deceived into believing that the perpetrators had noble intentions"), including the three coup leaders. As he put it, "We [the Ba'athist government] extend our hand to all those who considered us enemies. We extend it just as March 8 did it, and with the same zeal, because we want to build our country and push the entire Arab world towards Unity, Freedom and Socialism." In the same address, he was very harsh about those whose sentences had not been commuted, calling them the leaders of the rebellion.

=== Decree No. 110 ===
On the evening of July 18, Decree No. 110 was issued, which ordered the creation of a Martial Law Council, which assumed responsibility for the trials of the conspirators. The council was headed by Salah al-Dalli, and the following day it began meetings and trials of the conspirators. As a result of this trials, 27 death sentences were passed and carried out.

=== Interrogation of suspects ===
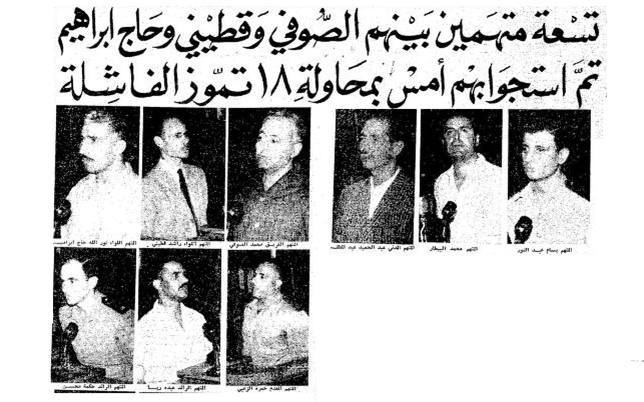
Newspaper reports on the interrogation of nine Syrians. From left to right, from above to down - Nur Allah Haj Ibrahim, Rashid Qatini, Muhammad al-Sufi, Abdul Rahman Abdul Muttalib, Mohammed al-Baitar, Bassam Abdel Nur, Hekmat Hassan, Abdo Rai, Hamza al-Zoubi.

The conspirators, who were put on the wanted list, were also required to hand over all their property (otherwise it would be confiscated by the government). On September 12, the newspaper published a report on the interrogation of nine people suspected of involvement in the July coup attempt. These men were: Major General Rashid Qatini, former Chief of Staff Muhammad al-Sufi, former Minister of Defense Nur Allah Haj Ibrahim, former Air Force Commander Hamza al-Zoubi, Major Bassam Abdel Nur, Major Hekmat Hassan, Major Abdo Rai, Captain Mohammed al-Baitar and the only non-military, Abdul Rahman Abdul Muttalib. Also present were three accused - Jassem Alwan, Raef al-Maarri and Mohammed Nabhan. The interrogation was carried out by a military court presided over by Colonel Salah al-Dalli.

The interrogation revealed many details - for example, Abdul Rahman Abdul Muttalib was supposed to drive the conspirators to meetings, without being present himself, or deliver written messages from one to another (for which he even had to go to a meeting in Lebanon). Muhammad al-Sufi, in turn, was responsible for establishing contacts with commanders from tank units. Hamza al-Zoubi testified to the very low level of organization of the conspiracy. Most of the nine interrogated stated that the coup was planned with the aim of unification with Egypt and expansion of the NCRC (so that more non-Ba'athists would join it). It was also planned to carry out sabotage, such as planting mines to blow up bridges. Some interrogated also demonstrated the fragility of the planned coup system, stating that they left the planning of the plot days and even weeks before its implementation.

=== Relations with Egypt ===
After the coup, the Military Committee broke off relations with Egypt, accusing it of supporting the coup and helping to organize it. Four days later, on July 22, Egyptian president Gamal Abdel Nasser announced in a speech that he was abandoning the idea of a federation with Syria, calling the Ba'athist regime "fascists" and stating that the UAR (official name of Egypt at the time) had nothing to do with it and don't want unification anymore. The Ba'ath Party did not recognize the leadership of Nasser and Nasserism. Ba'athists eventually consolidated their reign and became the only power in Syria, but the attempted coup led to a gradual escalation of infighting within the Military Committee, with each member building patronage networks among military, tribal and religious leaders, which undermined discipline and party organization.

== See also ==
- Aden Emergency
- North Yemen civil war
- November 1963 Iraqi coup d'état
