= Muntalaqat =

1963 Syrian ideological document

Muntalaqat, also known as the Ba'd al-Muntalaqat al-Nadriyyah (lit. Some theoretical perspectives) was a Syrian ideological document adopted by the Ba'ath Party at its Sixth National Congress in October 1963. Throughout the entire existence of the Ba'athist states in Iraq and Syria, this document remained the ideological basis for both factions of the Ba'ath Party (both the pro-Iraqi and pro-Syrian factions). The document was quite radical in its content, clearly inspired by communism (although not officially adopting it), and ultimately the ideas it promoted were adopted as the basis of neo-Ba'athism.

== Causes of occurrence ==
Another fundamental document of the Ba'athist government in Syria, the 1947 Ba'ath Party constitution, was not a clear and adequate program of action and failed to address everything that the new authorities had to do. Furthermore, due to Syria's political position in the Arab world (for example, it break out with Egypt), the party was forced to develop at least some kind of adequate program for its own survival.

== Creation ==
During the Sixth National Congress, delegates discussed the ideological errors and problems of Ba'athism, which the Muntalaqat was theoretically supposed to correct. The document was officially presented by Michel Aflaq, who is widely considered the founder of modern Ba'athism, but Aflaq prepared the document very reluctantly. Hammud al-Shufi, A radical and a member of the pro-Marxist faction within the party, also played a major role in shaping the ideological content of the document (Along with him, the communist Yassin al-Hafiz also had a significant influence on it).

At the time the document was adopted, the Ba'athists had already come to power in both Syria and Iraq. The Muntalaqat differed significantly in its ideological content from earlier ideological documents and communiqués of the Ba'ath Party and those of Michel Aflaq personally. Along with the party constitution of 1947, this turned out to be the only ideological document officially approved by the Ba'ath Party throughout its entire period of rule.

Muntalaqat has never been cancelled and served as the main source of modern Ba'athism. Later, the Muntalaqat remained an ideologically important document, but President Hafez al-Assad sometimes circumvented it for the sake of expediency: for example, the coalition of left-wing political organizations he formed, known as the National Progressive Front, was declared through the state constitution (adopted in 1973) and not through the party's constitution. After coming to power, Assad reversed Jadid's too radical policies, essentially returning to the original, less radical Muntalaqat.

== Ideology ==
Muntalaqat supported Marxist idea of Class struggle. The document was also very aggressive in his criticism of capitalism and advocated the rapid nationalization of all sectors of the Syrian economy. Despite his connections with pro-Marxist ideologists and pro-Marxist direction, he never once mentioned Marxism, criticized Stalinism and emphasized the constant mistakes made by the Soviet Union. However, Muntalaqat also supported Syria's desire for a "positively neutral" alliance with the USSR.

Muntalaqat proposed completely excluding religion from state governance. The anti-religious proposals in the document provoked strong resistance and discontent among religious Syrians, including those present at the Sixth National Congress. Already in those years, the Ba'athists carried out anti-religious purges in the army and state apparatus. However, the most aggressive anti-religious campaign took place between 1966 and 1970, during Salah Jadid's rule. It is believed that the Muntalaqat was one of the first reasons why the local branch of the Muslim Brotherhood became fiercely anti-Ba'athist.

== Chapters ==
Muntalaqat consists of the following chapters: an Introduction, followed by three other chapters dedicated to the main ideological slogan, "Unity, Freedom, Socialism." Each section outlines the party's fundamental principles in that area, then lists the shortcomings, and finally presents the general political and economic program of the Ba'athist government.

=== Unity ===
Muntalaqat criticized the "puppet-like" nature of Arab communists. The idea of pan-Arabism was replaced by the vague concept of an "Arab revolution." The peasants and workers were proclaimed as the foundation of the "Arab revolution": it was emphasized that only they could carry out the revolution.

=== Freedom ===
The liberal parliamentary system was deemed ineffective and unsuitable for Syrian society by this document and was replaced by "popular democracy" (known in Arabic as Dimuqratiya Sha'biya) which was supposed to exist through a "democratic-centralizing system" and channels between the party and people's organizations. The document also stated that the existence of a "leading party" exercising revolutionary powers does not in itself constitute a rejection of democracy.

=== Socialism ===
The document emphasized the Ba'athist "nationalist and socialist ideology" and its "Socialist Vanguard." The document also demonstrated the radical secular orientation of the party and proposed a "revolutionary" transformation of the country along socialist lines.
