= Workers' Battalions (Syria) =

Neo-Ba'athist popular militia in Syria

- كتائب العمال
- Leaders: Khalid al-Jundi; Izz al-Din Nasser
- Dates active: April 1964–2024
- Ideology: Neo-Ba'athism
- Political position: Far-left
- Size: 100,000
- Wars: 1964 Hama riot; 1966 coup attempt; Islamist uprising in Syria; Syrian civil war

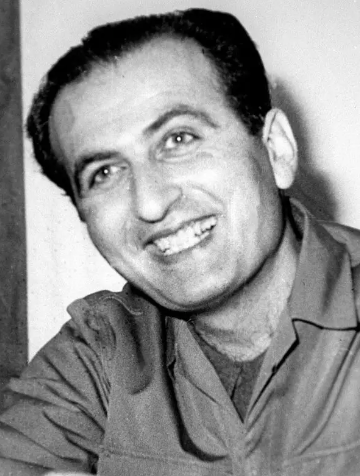
Salah Jadid

The Workers' Battalions (also known as Ba'athist Workers' Battalions or just Workers' Militia) were a neo-Ba'athist popular militia in Syria, formed (or, otherwise, greatly expanded) by the Salah Jadid regime. The battalions were described as a "proletariat national guard" and inspired by the Chinese Red Guards.

== Formation and role ==
The exact date of the militia's creation is unclear, but according to various sources, it ranges from April 1964 to February-March 1966. It was formed with the support of the National Guard of the Ba'ath Party. The battalions were commanded by Khalid al-Jundi. Jundi was also the president of the General Workers' Union and considered the complete destruction of the old order to be necessary. Jundi was also known for his anti-religious statements, similar to Marxist ones – he called religion "the opiate of the people."

Ba'athist politician Izz al-Din Nasser also participated in battalions' formation. According to some sources, the battalions consisted of approximately 100,000 militiamen.

Shortly after its creation, a large amount of weapons was distributed to the Battalions' militants by the ruling Ba'ath Party. The battalions consisted mainly of urban trade union activists. Their task was to disperse protests by merchants and monitor unstable regions of Syria. The Red Guards from Maoist China exerted a significant ideological influence on the Workers' Battalions: Syria at that time was generally strongly influenced ideologically by Maoism, and the party's Regional Command was even more radical than the Communist Party of the Soviet Union. The Workers' Battalions were responsible for spying on and violently humiliating "counter-revolutionaries," brutally interrogating and beating street vendors, "unreliable" party members, and generally anyone who fell under suspicion.

== History ==
=== 1964 Hama riots ===
In April 1964, an uprising broke out in Syria, led by a coalition of the Muslim Brotherhood, small businessmen, and merchants, against the Ba'athist government's policies, which were moving towards secularism and the nationalization of private enterprises. The protest movement soon expanded to include intellectuals, students and their teachers, engineers, lawyers, and so on – they demanded the restoration of civil liberties and the lifting of martial law, which was introduced in March 1963. Some sources note this uprising as the first historical moment in which Workers' Battalions participated – the government distributed weapons to them and ordered them to suppress the rebellion, which they did.

=== September 1966 coup attempt ===
The Workers' Battalions participated in suppressing the September 1966 Syrian coup attempt, launched by Salim Hatum. They supported the Jadid regime and took to the streets to defend it.

=== Crackdown of protests ===
In the first half of January 1965, the party issued the Ramadan Socialist Decrees (also known as just Ramadan Decrees), which nationalized approximately 100 of the largest companies, and in February, additional decisions were made to strengthen the public sector. Small traders and manufacturers in large cities responded to the decrees by closing their businesses and staging protests; Workers' Battalions again suppressed all their demonstrations. The protest campaign was described by the government as "incited by reactionary religious organizations and the expropriated class and merchants". In 1967, new wave of anti-government demonstrations took place because of the pro-atheistic article in a "People's Army" newspaper called "The Path to Creation of the New Arab Man", and the battalions were once again called upon to suppress them.

=== Six-Day War ===
After Six-Day War in 1967, the status of the Workers' Battalions and the Palestinian fedayeen of the as-Sa'iqa armed group became a new point of tension, as the state army and its defense minister, Hafez al-Assad, wanted to establish strict control over these formations, while Salah Jadid wanted to preserve their autonomy, viewing them as a tool for maintaining power. As a result, the rift between Assad and Jadid only widened.

=== 21st century ===
By the start of the Syrian civil war in 2011, the militia had still not been disbanded.
