= The Path to Creation of the New Arab Man =

Controversial atheist article from 1967 in Syria

The Path to Creation of the New Arab Man was a controversial and scandalous article published in the Syrian military newspaper "The People's Army" or "Jaysh al-Shaab" on April 25, 1967, and written by Ibrahim Khalas, at the time a member of the ruling Ba'ath Party and a neo-Ba'athist ideologist. The main objection to the article was its promotion of atheism, which sparked mass protests and clashes with security forces throughout Ba'athist Syria. This article is considered to be the first of its kind among all revolutionary Arab states.

== Background ==
In general, the increase in support for anti-religious policies by the Ba'ath Party began with their first seizure of power in 1963 – at the Sixth National Congress in October of that year, they presented an ideological document that eventually became fundamental, known as the Muntalaqat, which openly proposed eliminating religion from politics and then from public life, which caused discontent among the religious delegates present at the congress. Starting that year, the party carefully, but systematically carried out purges of religious leaders in the government, removing influential sheikhs and, at best, replacing them with their loyalists, if not atheists. It was also planned to exclude religious writings from all schools.

== Ibrahim Khalas' biography ==
Ibrahim Khalas (full name - Muhammad Ibrahim bin Muhammad Sadiq Khalas) was born in Latakia in 1940 and from an early age was imbued with the ideas of socialism and Marxism, eventually joining the Ba'ath Party. After receiving a high school diploma in industrial education in Cairo (during the period of the United Arab Republic), he entered the engineering faculty but was unable to complete his studies because he returned to Syria after its separation in 1961 and the Ba'ath Party's rise to power in 1963. He joined the naval academy and later joined a radical faction within the party, now known as the Qutriyn or regionalists, led by Salah Jadid.

At the moment of article's publication, Halas was a junior morale guidance officer of the Syrian Army and an Alawite, like many other members of the government. Alawites were generally not respected members of Syrian society, which is predominantly Sunni. However, Halas considered religion to be the main symbol of reaction. In 1976, he left for Kuwait and remained there until the Iraqi invasion of the country in 1990, after which he returned to Syria, where he was interrogated many times. In 1993, he attended the funeral of Salah Jadid. In 1997, he was searched again and sentenced to 6 years in prison. After his release, he was unable to obtain his documents and died in August 2014.

== The article's publication ==
Article was published on April 25, 1967, by the so-called Moral Guidance Department of the Syrian army. Every single copy of the newspaper was sold out.

=== Ideology, promoted by the article ===
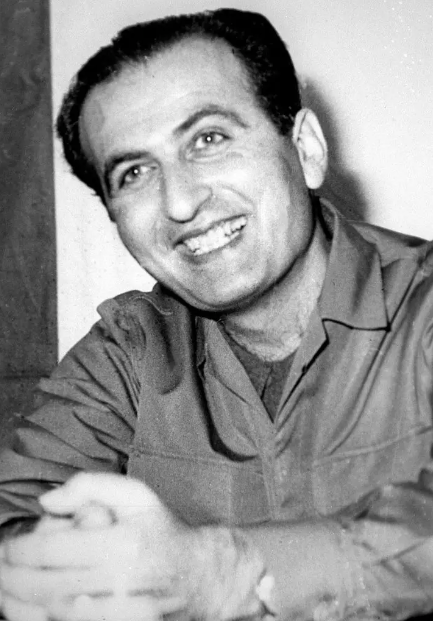
Salah Jadid, the most pro-atheist ever leader of Ba'athist Syria (1966–1970)

The article put forward a path towards the formation of a concept that would later become known as the "Arab Socialist New Man" (but more rarely he was known as "Ibrahim Khalas's New Man"). He believed, that "the new values which will create the new Arab man are such as emerge from the afflicted man who rebels, that burst forth from the heart of the starved man, break out of the new socialist revolutionary man who believes in man and man only." According to Halas, the New Man is a "socialist and revolutionary."

The article equated religion with feudalism, colonialism and capitalism – in general terms, the article suggested getting rid of all the values of the old society. The article called all them "mummies which should be transferred to the museums of historical remains" and noted that there is only one true value: "the new man who relies on himself and on his own contribution to humanity." According to its view, there was neither hell nor heaven, only inevitable death and nothing beyond it. In the article, Khalas viewed Islam (the main religion of the Syrian population) as the primary cause of the backwardness of the Arab population, fostering submissiveness and unproductiveness, and hindering progress.

== Article content ==
The article stated (copied from the book "Permanent Trauma: A Reading of Dima Wannous' The Frightened Ones and Ibtisam Teresa's Cities of Pigeons" by Ahmad Khaleel Al-Khabbas):

The Arab nation sought refuge in God. They also searched for the old values in Islam and Christianity, and they sought help from the feudalist and capitalist system along with other well-known ideologies in the middle ages, but all that availed them nothing. The sick values, which were the offshoot of capitalism, feudalism and colonialism, rendered the Arab individual submissive and dependent... The new socialist Arab individual believes that Allah, religions, feudalism, capital and colonialism are no more than mummified dolls in the museums of history since there is only one value which is the absolute conviction in the new human being who solely depends on himself , work and what he gives to... humanity. Man well realizes that death is his inevitable end, and there will be heaven or hell. We need not a person who prays and meekly kneels down seeking [Allah’s] mercy and forgiveness because the prayer’s ultimatum goal as Proust said is: Oh my God, give me your attention.? But we need revolutionary socialist individual.

== People's reaction ==
Along with aggressive government campaigns of nationalization and confiscation of property, the bluntness with which the article promoted atheism became the spark that led to mass demonstrations. The director of moral guidance noted that, in protest, Syrian soldiers in the Golan Heights had begun praying in their trenches. The religious community reacted very strongly and negatively to this article. Sunni Muslims perceived Ba'athist secularism, which was moving towards complete atheism, as a provocation. Most of the newspaper articles arrived with a delay of several days, but the article from May 2 "exposing" Halas as an agent of enemy intelligence services arrived on time in almost every corner of the country.

=== Religious resistance ===
As early as May 4, religious leaders from all over the country gathered in Damascus to discuss their plan of action against the pro-atheistic government of Syria. They planned two possible responses to the article: the first was aggressive resistance and struggle. They rejected this option because they were confident that the groups they relied on would be crushed by the government army, a clearly more coordinated and better-equipped force. The second option was to "suppress dissent in their hearts" and ignore the situation. In the end, they settled somewhere in the middle.

=== Protests' escalation ===
The following day, Sheikh Habanka delivered a religious sermon at the Manjak mosque against the neo-Ba'athist government (he was arrested two days later along with 40 other religious sheikhs) – immediately after the sermon, mass protests by Muslim and even Christian believers began there, shouting anti-Ba'athist slogans. According to some reports, approximately 30,000 people participated in this protest. Soon, the protests and strikes spread to Aleppo, Hama, and Homs, and escalated into clashes with security forces, and a few people was killed. In the following three weeks, up to 3,000 religious figures, merchants, and nobles were arrested. Despite the harsh and decisive measures taken against the protesters, the regime ultimately gave in.

Despite all the public anger caused by the article among Sunni Muslims and even Christians, the Alawites did not react at all (Khalas was an Alawite).

== Government's response ==
The article in the magazine was so openly critical of religion that even the neo-Ba'athist government, which had generally adopted a course of secularizing governance and society and unofficially promoting an anti-religious campaign, was forced to react to it.

=== Imprisonment of Khalas and purges ===
All copies of the article were very quickly confiscated by security forces. At May 5, Khalas and his two accomplices were declared agents working for the CIA and Mossad and sentenced to life imprisonment with hard labor by an extraordinary military court headed by Mustafa Tlass (but all three were later released). The article's accusations were directed not only at the CIA and Mossad: in addition, "the Americans, the English, the Jordanians, the Saudis... and Salim Hatum (anti-government officer that tried to launch a coup attempt but failed and fled to Jordan)" also fell under "suspicion". In addition, in order to lessen (or at least redirect in the right direction) public anger, the party began to intensify anti-Israeli rhetoric. Following the "uncovering of a conspiracy," two Saudi diplomats were expelled from the country, and the special services carried out mass purges of "reactionary elements."

=== Government's media reaction ===
On May 6, the semi-official newspaper "Al-Thawra" stated that the government respects Allah and religion, and on May 7, Damascus radio made the following statement:

The sinful and insidious article published in the magazine came as a link in the chain of an American-Israeli reactionary conspiracy... Investigation by the authorities has proved that the article and its author were merely tools of the CIA which has been able to infiltrate most basely and squalidly and to attain its sinful aims of creating confusion among the ranks of the citizens.

=== The party's view on atheism ===
Halas didn't stay in prison for long, and in principle, he only ended up there to appease public anger, and not because the other members of the party disagreed with him: atheism was widespread among neo-Ba'athists, and atheistic ideas found strong support at the top.

== Aftermath ==
The article led to a rise in extremism within the main Islamist group in Syria at the time, the regional Muslim Brotherhood. This resulted in some of its members breaking away from the main group and forming a new organization known as the Fighting Vanguard. The article also had a profound impact on the future president of Syria, Hafez al-Assad, the minister of defense at the time, who also was an Alawite and had to participate in suppressing the demonstrations.
