= Qutriyun =

Faction within the Syrian Ba'ath Party

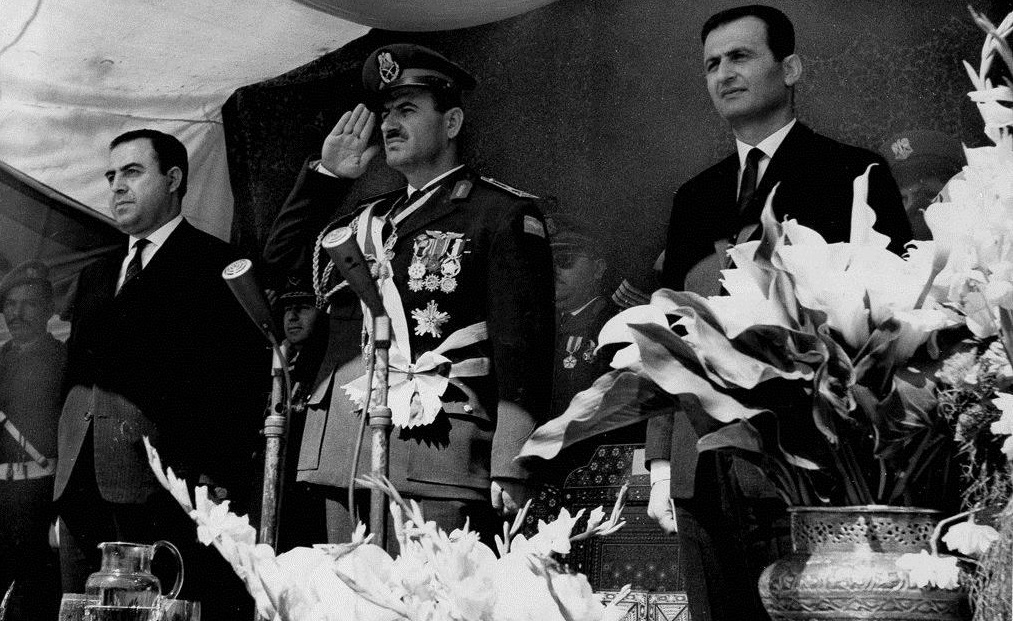
Members of the Party's Regional Command during military parade, 1967. From left to right: Nureddin al-Atassi, Hafez al-Assad, Salah Jadid. They all were regionalists.

Qutriyun (also known as Iqlimiyyun or Regionalists) was a faction within the Ba'ath Party that promoted "Syria First" ideas instead of pan-Arabism. Their ideological beliefs were sometimes called "Regionalist Ba'athism." Yassin al-Hafiz, a communist who wrote a number of ideological works such as "Ba'athist experiment" (1963) or "A Few Theoretical Propositions" (1964), had a great influence on the ideology of early Syrian regionalists.

The Qutriyun were the most powerful faction in the Ba'ath Party since it seized power in Syria in 1963, and remained so until the fall of Syrian Ba'athism in 2024. The idea of "Qutriyunism" later also became the concept of Assadism. The term was later applied in the same derogatory manner to competing Islamist militias during the Syrian civil war. Within the party, they were opposed by the Qawmiyuri faction (Nationalists). The most prominent regionalist figures were considered to be Yusuf Zuayyin, Salah Jadid, Muhammad Umran and Hafez al-Assad.

== Etymology ==
The term Qutriyun comes from the Arabic word "Qutr," meaning region. The faction was ideologically focused exclusively on Syria, which, in pan-Arab ideology, was supposed to be, like other Arab countries, a "region" of a single, larger Arab state (so-called wahda wataniyya).

The term Iqlimiyyun was a derogatory term and was mainly used by pan-Arabists to refer to the Syrian Social Nationalist Party, a purely "regionalist" party that was considered a traitor to the ideas of pan-Arabism.

== History ==
=== Early formation ===
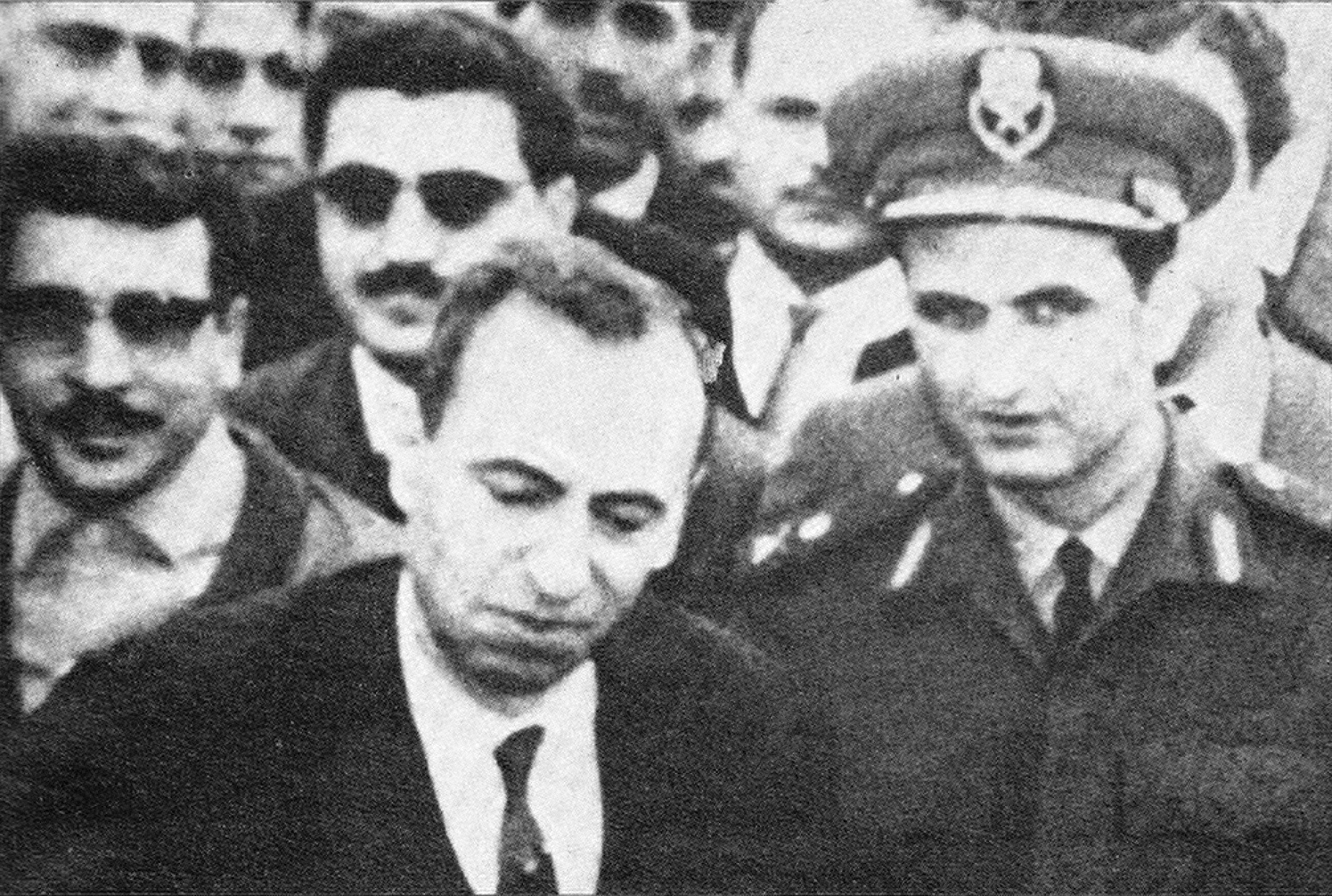
Michel Aflaq (l., nationalist) and Salah Jadid (regionalist) together in 1963

The ideological regionalists were able to form a unified command by the end of 1961 and first appeared in public at the Fifth Congress of the Ba'ath Party in May 1962 (at that time the party did not yet rule the country). The dissolution of the Syrian-Egyptian unification, known as the United Arab Republic, in 1961 led to the revelation of political struggle within the party, and regionalists actively participated in it, now openly promoting the ideas of "Syria First". They were opposed by a faction known as the Qawmiyyun (or Qawmiyuri), which supported pan-Arabism and, by extension, union with Egypt. In the early stages, the civilian regionalists were led by Dr. Yusuf Zuayyin. The secret Military Committee, created during the UAR years to preserve Syrian Ba'athism, eventually developed relationships with the broader ideological regionalists who eventually occupied all the important political positions after the seizure of power. The fall of the UAR had a generally positive effect on regionalist ideologies across the Arab world, and this was most evident in Syria.

=== Early Ba'ath Party rule ===
Party leaders Michel Aflaq and Salah al-Din al-Bitar, despite the disastrous experience of the past, supported the revival of the union with Egypt, and therefore tried to suppress the regionalists (as well as other hostile groups in the party) through purges and dismissals, but this did not work out well. After the 1961 coup d'etat and the separation of Syria from Egypt, the regionalists began reorganizing the party without consulting Aflaq. In 1963, the Ba'ath Party's Military Committee finally staged a successful coup and seized power in Syria. Due to the regionalists' campaigns to reorganize in their favor, the Latakia branch of the party, largely composed of Alawite regionalists, became one of the most powerful in the new state. After the 1963 coup, the party's membership increased fivefold, and it consisted mainly of poor people, military personnel, workers, and students - the future core of the regionalists; however, the regionalist faction was largely dominated by military officers only. The party's civilian wing, as well as the National Guard, soon also became filled with regionalists, with the assistance of one of the leaders of the military committee, General Salah Jadid, who was also a regionalist. The Qutriyun faction supported the Ramadan Socialist Decrees of 1965, that nationalized huge amount of enterprises in Syria.

At the Eighth National Congress in December 1965, Michel Aflaq attempted a purge and dismissed a number of influential regionalists from the party, but this had no real impact on their influence, and within a few months they had seized all power in the country. Two days before the 1966 coup, Aflaq, in a speech, condemned the regionalists for their perversion of the party.

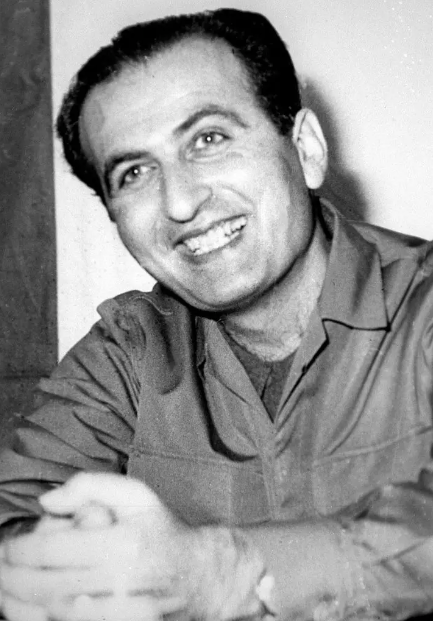
Salah Jadid

=== Salah Jadid's reign ===
In February 1966, another military coup occurred, bringing regionalist Salah Jadid to power. His radical leftist regime declared the dissolution of the National Command and that the Regional Command would henceforth be the supreme authority. It was precisely because of Jadid's policies that the regionalists finally gained dominance in the state apparatus. The coup caused a major split in the Ba'athist movement. The regionalist Salah Jadid's policy most radically rejected pan-Arab unity with any of the other Arab countries, where Syria would not have a dominant role.

=== Hafez al-Assad's reign ===
In 1970, the regime of Salah Jadid was overthrown by the Corrective Revolution orchestrated by Hafez al-Assad. Although Assad abandoned his initial radicalism and even participated in new pan-Arab unification projects (such as the Federation of Arab Republics), he ultimately slid back toward Syrian nationalism, and Syria itself, as under Jadid, once again found itself in regional isolation.

== Beliefs ==
Regionalists called their doctrine "Arab path to socialism." Their political beliefs were focused solely on Syria - they supported radical socialism, did not support Michel Aflaq and Aflaqism, and they opposed the revival of the union with Egypt. The regionalists' ideology was influenced by Gamal Abdel Nasser's dissolution of the party during the UAR's period. The regionalists continued to largely support Ba'athism as an ideology, but were enemies of its leader, Michel Aflaq, as well as his National Command. The regionalists supported the ideas of the "national liberation struggle" of the Arab world, for example, offering impressive support to the Palestinian fedayeen in their resistance to Israel. They spoke very harshly about the comprehensive Egyptian domination of Syria during the period of unity and believed that it was necessary to return nationalization and land reform policies, as well as implement "socialism in one country" instead of the failed attempts at pan-Arab experiments. So, the regionalists were convinced that first and foremost it was necessary to defend Ba'athism in one country (specifically Syria). Regionalists also believed in more radical interpretations of Ba'athism, which later became known as neo-Ba'athism. Unlike the supporters of Aflaqism, the regionalists advocated rapid modernization measures for Syria and an extremely strong rapprochement with the USSR (Aflaq believed, that Soviet Union is a new form of imperialism). Due to their unconventional political views, regionalists began to be labeled as extremists and radicals.

The regionalists favored secularism and the destruction of centuries-old religious traditions, compared to the "nationalists," who were predominantly Sunni urban classes and wanted to establish good relations with fundamentalist Islamic groups like the Muslim Brotherhood. They were also fierce opponents of conservatism and conservative Syrian parties.

== Compound ==
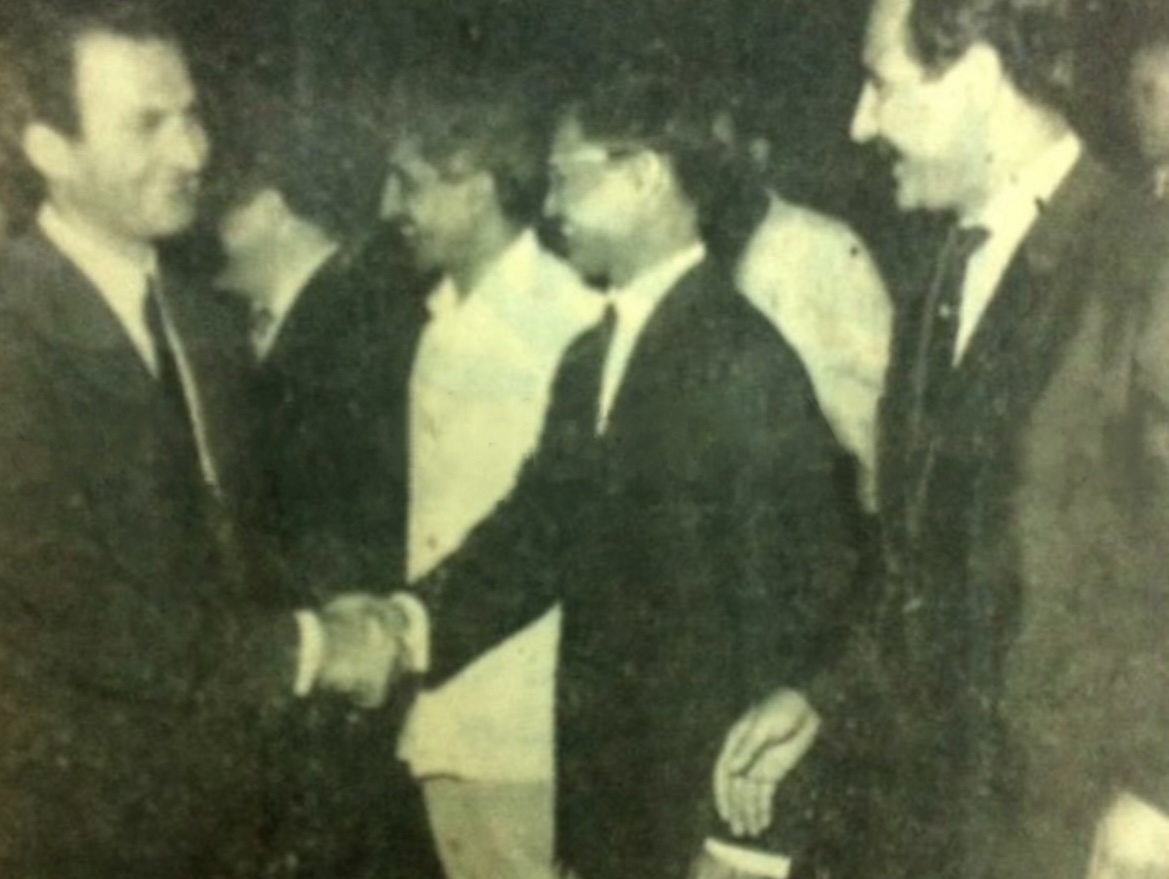
Jadid (left) with the Party members in 1967

The regionalists did not immediately become a unified group, but were initially more of a term to describe all opponents of unity with Egypt.The most radical regionalists came from rural areas. The regionalists were mostly from rural areas and were Ba'ath Party militants. They controlled most of the Ba'ath Party's provincial branches, with particularly strong influence and support in rural areas or the west of the country. In addition to their numerical superiority, the regionalists had complete control over the lower echelons of the party and the recruitment of new recruits, which greatly facilitated the further expansion of their ideological base within the party.

Overall, the ideological composition of the regionalists varied from those who supported pan-Arabism only in words to those who supported slow unification, did not attach much importance to it, and were fierce enemies of unity - the latter were the majority.

== See also ==
- Saddamism
- Nasserism
