= Raef al-Maarri =

Personal details
- Occupation: Army officer

Military service
- Rank: Colonel

Raef al-Maarri (Arabic: رائف المعرّي) was an officer in the Syrian Army and a deputy of Colonel Jassem Alwan.

Politically aligned with the Nasserists, supporters of Egyptian president Gamal Abdel Nasser, Maarri and Alwan orchestrated a failed coup attempt against the Ba'athist-dominated government that took power in the coup d'état of 8 March 1963, which toppled the secessionist government of Nazim al-Qudsi and Khalid al-Azm. The latter two themselves gained power after a coup that ended the union with Egypt in the United Arab Republic. The Nasserists were major participants in the 8 March coup, but were increasingly sidelined by the Ba'athists who executed a mass purging of Nasserists and political independents beginning in late April.

Maarri and Alwan planned a counter coup against the Ba'athists with the aid of the Arab Nationalist Movement in Syria and Egyptian intelligence. The insurrection was launched on 18 July, but was violently quelled by the security forces led Amin al-Hafiz, the Ba'athist Interior Minister. Several Nasserist officers were arrested and executed in the immediate aftermath, but Maarri managed to flee the authorities and went into hiding in the Ghouta countryside of Damascus with Alwan. After being discovered and apprehended, both were tried by a military court where Maarri pleaded guilty to his role in the abortive coup, stating it was an attempt to ensure the unification process with Egypt and Iraq would continue in light of the Ba'athists' perceived anti-unionist actions. Maarri was sentenced to death, but the sentence was later reduced to life imprisonment on 10 December. He was released a year later in December 1964 with Alwan and several other alleged participants in the July coup in an amnesty agreement. Afterward, the men were escorted to the border with Lebanon from which they departed for the Egyptian embassy in Beirut to seek asylum in Egypt, which Egypt granted.
