= Ramadan Socialist Decrees =

1965 nationalization decrees in Syria

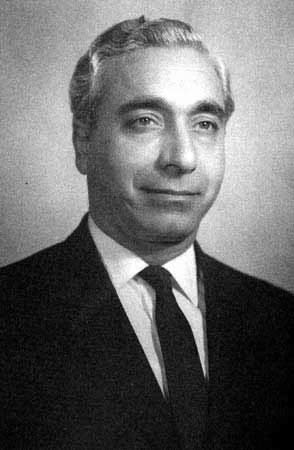
Amin al-Hafiz, president of Syria who signed the Ramadan Socialist Decrees

The Ramadan Socialist Decrees (also known as Ramadan Decrees, January 1965 Decrees or January Nationalization Decrees) were a series of decrees issued by the government of Ba'athist Syria nationalizing a number of private enterprises, signed mostly in the first days of January 1965. In addition to nationalizing enterprises, the decrees significantly increased the state's share in 15 huge enterprises that were not subject to nationalization (it was mainly 25 percent, but after the signing of the decrees it increased to 75 percent). The decrees were signed by President Amin al-Hafiz.

== Background ==
The idea of widespread nationalization was put forward by radicals from the Qutriyun faction within the Ba'ath Party (such as Abdul Karim al-Jundi or Yusuf Zuayyin), led by the Military Committee. Michel Aflaq and Salah ad-Din al-Bitar were against these measures. In addition, the country faced an economic crisis, and the government considered it absolutely necessary to concentrate not only political but also economic power in its hands.

Prior to the signing of the decrees, the state press and radio highlighted the resistance of reactionaries within and outside the party to the nationalization measures, and reported on uncovered conspiracies. As a result, supporters of nationalization carried out purges and strengthened control over the country's borders to prevent the export of capital before nationalization.

== Nationalization ==
A large series of new nationalization decrees began on January 1, but most of them were signed between January 2 and 4. On the evening of January 2, Damascus radio launched a fierce attack on "exploiters and capitalists" and announced the signing of decrees on nationalization. The Department of the Socialist Sector of Industry was formed to oversee the activities of nationalized enterprises.

The decrees led to the full or partial nationalization of more than 100 of the largest private enterprises in Syria, almost all significant enterprises that existed in Syria at that time (approximately 30 companies were fully nationalized, and approximately 70 were partially nationalized). The total assets of all nationalized enterprises amounted to approximately 240 million Syrian pounds, and they employed up to 12,000 people. Enterprises that were "partially" nationalized came under state control to the extent of 75 to 90 percent but were "fully nationalized" in 1970. The nationalized enterprises were organized into so-called Unions. There were a total of four Unions: food, textiles, chemicals, and engineering unions. However, not only large enterprises were affected, but also small workshops and shops, even though they were not the main target of nationalization. 70 percent of foreign trade also ended up in the hands of the state. There has also been a significant outflow of private capital from the country.

Apparently, a total of four major decrees on nationalization were signed. The first decree completely nationalized a total of 22 factories in major cities. The second decree nationalized 24 enterprises by 90 percent and another 61 enterprises by 75 percent. The third decree promised compensation to certain types of small traders and artisans. The fourth decree established life imprisonment or the death penalty for those who would resist nationalization.

== Aftermath ==
Following the implementation of the 1965 decrees, the government gained complete dominance over all sectors of the economy. After the nationalization decrees were adopted, Syria was able to attract the attention of countries such as East Germany and the Soviet Union, which began to support it economically, sending money, equipment, and even a number of advisors. The USSR, on the whole, welcomed these decrees. In February, the government intensified its policy of striving for broader control over the economy.

=== Resistance to nationalization ===
The signing and implementation of the nationalization decrees triggered mass demonstrations (later met with state repression and suppression), primarily in the country's major cities, in support of private entrepreneurs – most of the protesters themselves were artisans or merchants. Special military courts handed down death sentences to those who participated in protests or strikes, labeling them as reactionaries and conspirators. Workers' Battalions were deployed to suppress the protests. In addition to demonstrations, the country saw initiatives to close small shops by disgruntled merchants. However, the resistance to nationalization generally proved ineffective. However, some of the enterprises were later returned to private managers.

The decrees also caused serious disagreements and conflict between the government and wealthy farmers. This government policy led to disruptions in the supply of resources necessary for the functioning of rural areas, such as fertilizers or tractors, which in turn led to a decline in crop yields.

=== Reaction of Syrian communists ===
The decrees received strong support from Syrian communists, in particular the Syrian Communist Party. In a telegram to Amin al-Hafiz, Khalid Bakdash stated that he and his comrades would make every effort to preserve these achievements and develop them further.
