= Waḥda, Ḥurriyya, Ishtirākiyya =

Ba'athist slogan

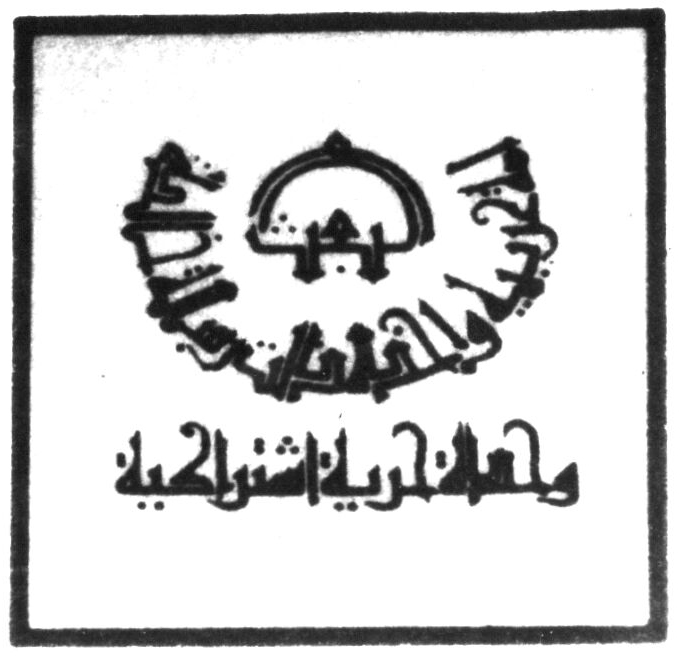
Unity, Freedom, Socialism

Waḥda, Ḥurriyya, Ishtirākiyya (Arabic: وَحْدَةٌ، حُرِّيَّةٌ، اِشْتِرَاكِيَّةٌ, lit. 'Unity, Freedom, Socialism') (Note: Also translated as Unity, Liberty, Socialism) is a Pan-Arab and Ba'athist slogan and key tenet associated with the Arab Socialist Ba'ath Party. The slogan served as the national motto of Ba'athist Syria from 1963 to 2024 and Ba'athist Iraq from 1968 to 1991 as well as Libya under the Gaddafi regime from 1969 to 2011. The slogan expresses the basic principles of the Ba'ath Party, reflecting its revolutionary, Arab socialist, and pan-Arabist doctrine. The slogan was a central topic of discussion in the main ideological document of Ba'athism, known as the Muntalaqat.

== History ==
The slogan was coined by Michel Aflaq, who believed in a necessary revolutionary transformation of Arab society toward the goals of unity, freedom, and socialism. "Unity" stood for the creation of an independent, strong, unified Arab nation. "Freedom" or "liberty" did not mean liberal democracy, but rather freedom from colonial oppression and freedom of speech and thought. "Socialism" on the other hand did not mean socialism as defined in the Western world, but rather a unique form of Arab socialism. Aflaq believed that the Ba'ath Party would rule and guide the people as a vanguard party in a transitional period of time without consulting the people. According to Ba'athist thought, socialism had originated under the rule of the Islamic prophet Muhammad.

Both Syria and Iraq under Ba'athist rule adopted a variant of the Arab Liberation Flag as their national flag, featuring three green stars which represented the three core pillars of Ba'athism: unity, freedom, and socialism. The slogan of Unity, Freedom, Socialism was also used during the 1969 Libyan revolution that was led by colonel Muammar Gaddafi.

== Meaning ==
=== Unity ===
The Ba'ath Party saw the creation of a single Arab nation as a basis for a working methodology. It rejected nationalist parties within individual Arab states, viewing them as negative, limited, and ultimately futile. It also opposed imperialism in all its forms, including Zionism, and denounced racial and ethnic discrimination. Ba'athists also advocated for a secular state where religion and state were separated, promoting religious tolerance while allowing religious life and values to thrive.

=== Freedom or Liberty ===
Freedom or liberty was understood as the liberation of the Arab world from both Western colonialism and indirect neocolonialism. Aflaq defined freedom as "freedom from the outside, against the foreigner, the imperialist; and freedom inside, opposite oppressive rulers." While some scholars interpret this as merely independence from external domination, Ba'athist principles were broader and emphasized that the party "believes freedom of speech, freedom of association, and freedom of worship and art to be sacred; no government can impair them."

=== Socialism ===
Both Michel Aflaq and Salah al-Din al-Bitar rejected the communist interpretation of socialism, deeming it "unsuitable to the Arabs." They argued that Arab socialism extended beyond basic material needs, such as food, shelter, and clothing, emphasizing the liberation of human potential and creativity. Ba'athists contended that these objectives would be obtained by revolution.

== Order of importance ==
The founding fathers of Ba'athist thought disagreed with each other on the importance of each of the three components of the slogan. While Zaki al-Arsuzi put freedom first, Michel Aflaq argued that all three were important, but unity had "priority and greater moral weight and the ranks of the Ba'ath cannot ignore that fact." The order Aflaq proposed was the one that went forward.

== Criticism ==
After the fall of the Assad regime in Syria, Sami Moubayed, a Damascus-based historian and writer, said that both the Iraqi and Syrian branches of the Ba'ath Party failed to live up to their slogan of "Unity, Freedom, and Socialism." He remarked, "There was never unity, let alone freedom. Their socialism amounted to disastrous nationalizations."
