= Military Committee of the Ba'ath Party =

Ba'athist Syrian Committee (1958–1966)

- Logo of the Ba'ath Party.
- Formation: 1958
- Extinction: 1966

Executive branch
- President: Lu'ay al-Atassi (1963); Amin al-Hafiz (1963–1966)

The Military Committee of the Ba'ath Party was a Syrian secret organization, initially consisting of 5 army officers who were supporters of the Arab Socialist Ba'ath Party, which later became the ruling military junta.

It was formed in February 1958, soon after creation of the United Arab Republic, a unification of Syria and Egypt. It came to power in Syria in March 1963 and disbanded at the end of February 1966.

== As a secret organization ==
=== Creation of the Committee during the UAR period ===
In February 1958, the United Arab Republic was proclaimed, a unification of Egypt and Syria under the leadership of Gamal Abdel Nasser. Advocates of the union believed that Nasser would use the Ba'ath Party for ruling Syria. Unfortunately for the Ba'athists, it was never Nasser's intention to share an equal measure of power. Nasser established a new provisional constitution proclaiming a 600-member National Assembly with 400 members from Egypt and 200 from Syria, and the disbanding of all political parties, including the

Ba'ath. Though Nasser allowed former Ba'ath Party members to hold prominent political positions, they never reached positions as high in the government as did the Egyptian officials. During the winter and the spring of 1959–60, Nasser slowly squeezed prominent Syrians out of positions of influence. In the Syrian Ministry of Industry, for example, seven of the top thirteen positions were filled by Egyptians.

In Syria, opposition to union with Egypt mounted. Syrian Army officers resented being subordinate to Egyptian officers, and Syrian Bedouin tribes received money from Saudi Arabia to prevent them from becoming loyal to Nasser. Also, Egyptian-style land reform was resented for damaging Syrian agriculture, the Communists began to gain influence, and the intellectuals of the Ba'ath Party who supported the union rejected the one-party system.

Meanwhile, a group of Syrian Ba'athist officers, alarmed by the party's poor position and the increasing fragility of the union, decided to form a secret Military Committee; its initial members were Captain Abd al-Karim al-Jundi, Lieutenant-Colonel Muhammad Umran, Major Salah Jadid and Captain Hafez al-Assad. The Military Committee was a very secretive body. Members were sworn not to divulge any information about the organisation to officers who were not members in order to strengthen the Military Committee's hold on the military. Committee members were among those who blamed Michel Aflaq for the Ba'ath Party's failing during the UAR years. The chief aim of the Military Committee was to protect the UAR's existence and to save the Syrian Ba'ath movement from annihilation.

=== Post-UAR period ===
The Military Committee did not succeed in its aims, and in September 1961 the UAR was dissolved after military coup. Nazim al-Kudsi, who led the first post-UAR government, persecuted members of the committee for their Nasserite loyalties, and all of them were forced to retire from the Syrian Army. Following the 1961 coup that ended the UAR, the Committee started planning its own coup against the secessionist government of al-Qudsi.

== As ruling military junta ==
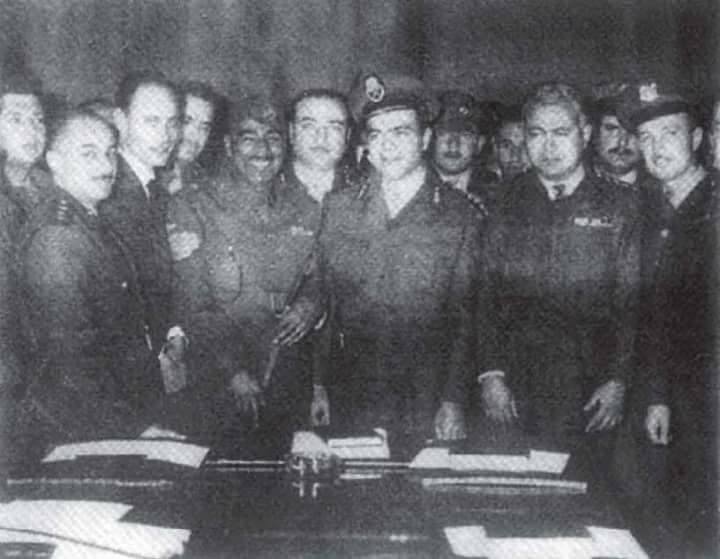
Syrian officers after the coup.

=== 1963 Coup d'etat and seizure of power ===
The committee was eventually able to carry out its coup on March 8, 1963, successfully overthrowing Nazim al-Qudsi and bringing the Ba'ath Party to power. To govern the country, the Committee formed the National Council for the Revolutionary Command (NCRC), which composed of 12 Ba'athists and eight Nasserists and independents. However, the Military Committee did not disband itself and remained within the NCRC, where it held all real power in Syria (This was described as a "Junta within a Junta").

The 1963 coup exposed a split in the Syrian Ba'ath Party between Aflaqis and neo-Ba'athists, with Aflaqis dominating the National Command and neo-Ba'athists the Military Committee (although the NCRC included some civilian leaders, it was largely dominated by military officers). In fact, dual power was established: the country's governance was divided between the "Civil Government" (represented by the National Command of the Ba'ath Party) and the "Military Government" (represented by the Military Committee and the NCRC, where is military officers dominated), and a lot of important decisions were made by Committee without the collaboration of their civilian colleagues. The head of a military party branch was called a tawjihi, or guide.

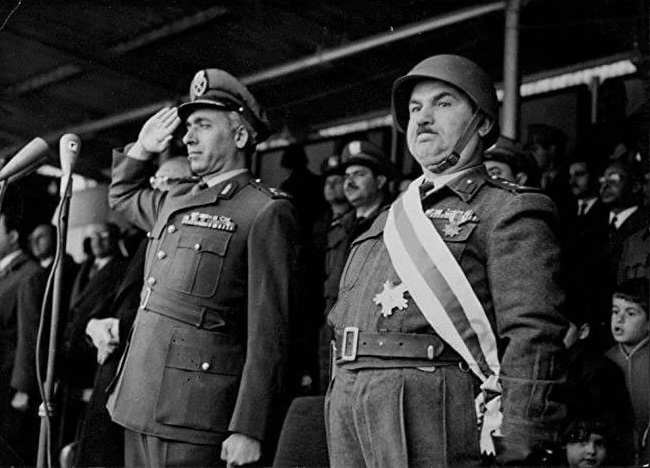
Amin al-Hafiz, 1964.

The break with Nasser weakened the original leaders of the Ba'ath Party, which in turn gave the Military Committee room to expand. After taking power, the Military Committee looked for theoretical guidance, but instead of going to Aflaq to solve problems (which was usual before), they contacted the party's Marxist faction led by Hammud al-Shufi.

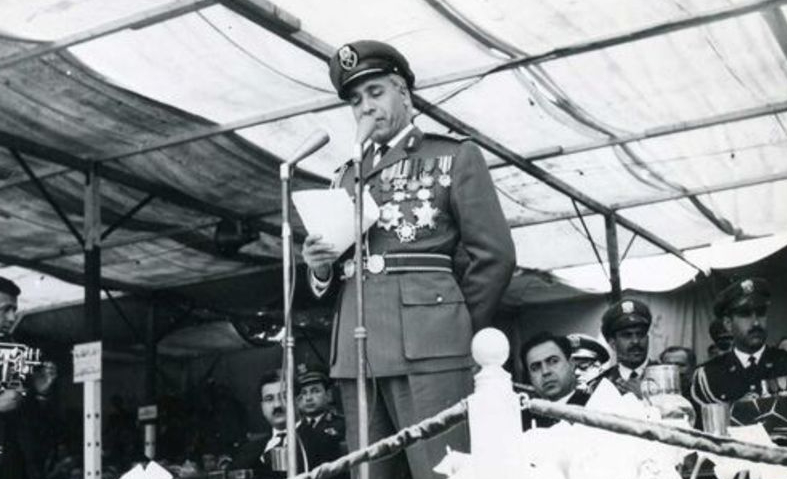
Amin al-Hafez speech.

Despite their stated desire to renew the union with Egypt, the Military Committee eventually began to purge the army, party, and NCRC against the Nasserists, in response to which the influential Nasser mobilized civilian supporters in Syria to protest (which, however, did not change the situation). Its other goal was also to create an alliance with Iraq, where the Ba'athists had come to power after successful overthrew of Abdul-Karim Qasim, an opponent of pan-Arabism, a few months earlier. However, the Ba'athist regime in Iraq was very quickly overthrown by the Nasserists. Committee also carried out purges within the Syrian Arab Armed Forces, as part of their efforts to subordinate the civilian old guard of the National Command and Aflaqists, and create an "ideological army" that was loyal to neo-Ba'athist officers from the committee. Munif al-Razzaz, former secretary general of the National Command, wrote that since 1961 there had existed two Ba'ath parties: "the military Ba'ath Party and the Ba'ath Party, and real power lay with the former." The Military Committee was directed towards combating the old guard of the Aflaqites: it was bent on removing Aflaq from a position of power, believing that he had become old and frail. At the Sixth National Congress held in October 1963, Aflaq was barely able to hold on to his post as Secretary General – the Marxist factions led by al-Shufi and Ali Salih al-Sa'di, in Syria and Iraq respectively, were the majority group.

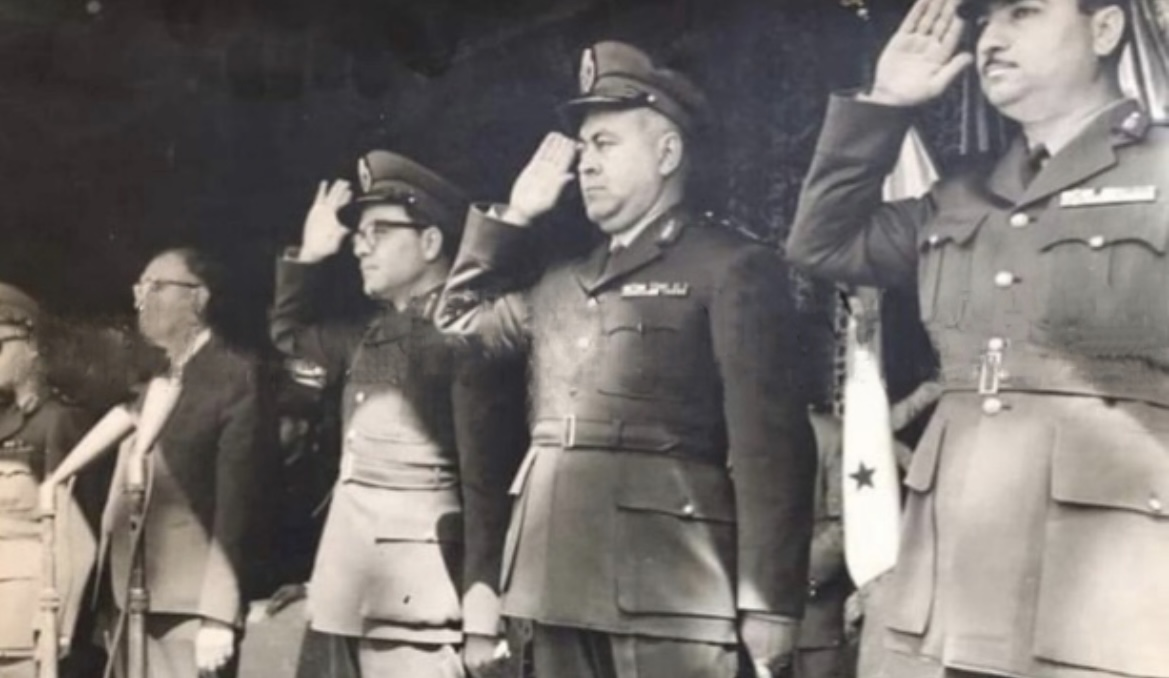
Syrian army officers, 1963.

Another problem facing Aflaq was that several of his colleagues were not elected to party office; for instance, al-Bitar was not reelected to a seat in the National Command. Instead of the traditional civilian leadership, a new leadership consisting of military officers was gradually growing; Jadid and Amin al-Hafiz from Syria and Ahmed Hassan al-Bakr and Salih Mahdi Ammash from Iraq were elected to the National Command. While the Military Committee was in fact taking control over the Ba'ath Party from the civilian leadership, they were sensitive to such criticism, and stated, in an ideological pamphlet, that civilian-military symbiosis was of major importance if socialist reconstruction was to be achieved. Gradually, the neo-Ba'athists began to dominate all state structures in Syria, displacing the Aflaqites and others.

In April 1964, a Muslim Brotherhood uprising broke out in Hama against the ruling Ba'ath Party. The decision to suppress the Hama riot led to a schism in the Military Committee between Muhammad Umran and Salah Jadid. Umran opposed force, instead wanting the Ba'ath Party to create a coalition with other pan-Arab forces. Jadid desired a strong one-party state, similar to those in the communist countries of Europe, also viewing it as a necessary means to protect Ba'athist power against "class enemies." The uprising was eventually suppressed by military force, and the following month the NCRC implemented a provisional constitution providing for a National Council of the Revolution (NCR), a cabinet, a Presidential Council, and an appointed legislature composed of "people's organizations." In 1965, the Ba'athist regime accepted proposals to conduct a campaign to Arabize the predominantly Kurdish northeastern regions of Syria, but this was not implemented until 1973–1976, under the leadership of Hafez al-Assad, and became known as Arab Belt project. Despite the Military Committee was built on a democratic framework, and a Military Organization Congress was held to elect the members of the Military Committee, only one congress was ever held; Moreover, in June 1964, it was decided that no new members would be admitted to the organization.

=== 1966 Coup and dissolving ===
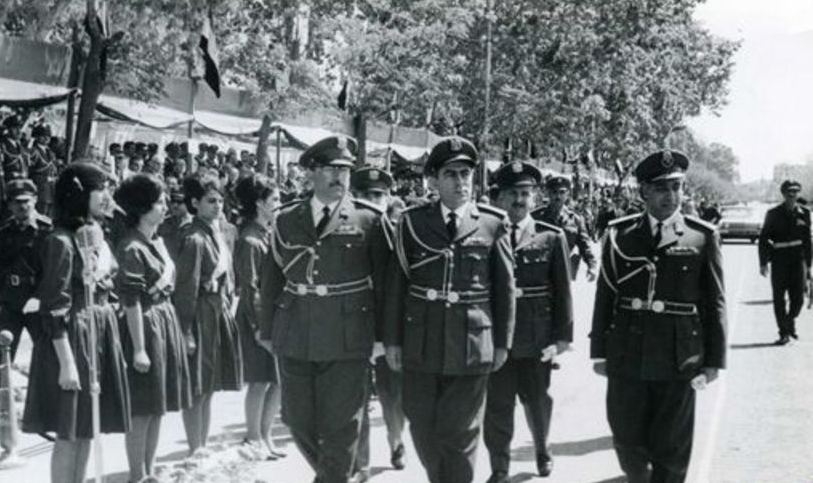
Members of a military junta, 1964.

In 1966, another coup took place in Syria. One of the Neo-Ba'athist generals of the Military Committee, Salah Jadid, seized power (in cooperation with some others). The coup overthrew the National Command, ousted all the Aflaqites from power, and finally consolidated the power of neo-Ba'athist military officers over Syria. The committee, which had been the officers' key decision-making process during 1963–66, lost its central institutional authority under Jadid because the fight against the Aflaqites was over – the key reason for the committee's existence in the first place (as well as the threat of the Ba'ath movement's disappearance). As a result of this coup, the military committee ceased to exist and, along with the NCRC, was dissolved by Jadid.

== Membership ==
=== Membership on the March, 1963 ===
- Salah Jadid
- Hafez al-Assad
- Muhammad Umran
- Abd al-Karim al-Jundi
- Salim Hatum
- Hamad Ubaid
- Ahmad Miration
