= Neo-Ba'athism =

Far-left variant of Ba'athism in Syria

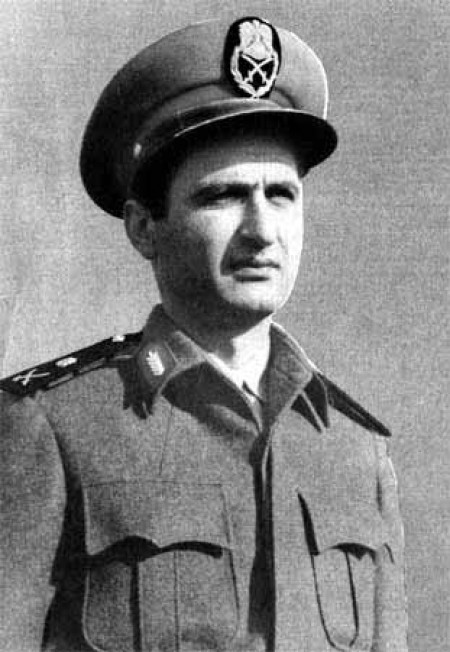
Syrian General Salah Jadid, who carried out the coup in 1966 that brought neo-Baathists to power

The flag of the United Arab Republic that was readopted by Ba'athist Syria, used from 1980 to 2024, is commonly used to represent Neo-Ba'athism. This flag is used as a symbol by loyalists of the deposed regime.

Neo-Ba'athism is a far-left variant of Ba'athism that became the state ideology of Ba'athist Syria, after the Arab Socialist Ba'ath party's sixth national congress in September 1963. As a result of the 1966 Syrian coup d'état launched by the neo-Ba'athist military committee led by Salah Jadid and Hafez al-Assad, Ba'ath party's Syrian regional branch was transformed into a militarist organization that became completely independent of the National Command of the original Ba'ath Party.

Neo-Ba'athism has been described as a divergence from Ba'athism proper that had gone beyond its pan-Arabist ideological basis by stressing the precedent of the military and purging the classical Ba'athist leadership of the old guard, including Michel Aflaq and Salah al-Din al-Bitar. The far-left neo-Ba'athist regime in Syria, which was influenced by various Marxist ideological schools, espoused radical leftist doctrines such as revolutionary socialism, abandoned pan-Arabism, sought to strengthen ties with the Soviet Union, and came into conflict with Arab nationalists such as Nasserists and the Iraqi Ba'athists, particularly Saddamists, with whom they maintained a bitter rivalry. From their seizure of power in the Syrian Arab Republic as a result of the 1963 Syrian coup d'état, neo-Ba'athist officers purged traditional civilian elites to establish a military dictatorship operating along totalitarian lines.

Neo-Ba'athism is primarily associated with Assadism, based on the policies of the successive governments of Hafez al-Assad and his son Bashar al-Assad. This system was largely characterized by nepotism and sectarianism, with Hafez al-Assad's seizure of power in the 1970 Syrian coup d'état leading to the consolidation of Alawite minority dominance within the military and security forces. State propaganda portrayed Assadism as a neo-Ba'athist current that evolved Ba'athist ideology with the needs of the modern era. Neo-Ba'athism has been criticized by the founder of Ba'athist ideology, Michel Aflaq, for diverging from the original principles of Ba'athism.

A series of revolutionary offensives launched by the Military Operations Command and allied militias in late 2024 led to the collapse of the Assad regime in December 2024. Since then, remnants of the Ba'athist military apparatus and Assad family loyalists have engaged in violent clashes across Alawite strongholds in Latakia, Tartus and parts of Western Syria.

== Ideology ==
The pro-Marxist resolutions and declarations, such as the espousal of "class struggle" and "scientific socialism", adopted by the Ba'ath party during its 6th national congress set the ideological foundation of neo-Ba'athism. Between 1963 and 1966, neo-Ba'athists exercised the de-facto political power in Ba'athist Syria and were able to steer their ideological goals through the 1963 provisional Ba'athist constitution and its 1964 amendment. They also carried out purges within the Syrian Arab Armed Forces, as part of their efforts to subordinate the civilian old guard of the National Command of the Ba'ath Party and create an "ideological army" that was loyal to neo-Ba'athist officers. In foreign policy, neo-Ba'athists favoured the Socialist Bloc and were proponents of establishing a close alliance with the Soviet Union. The Maoist military concept of "people's war of liberation" played a central role in neo-Ba'athist ideology, and this was reflected in Ba'athist Syria's endorsement of socialist and left-wing Palestinian fedayeen groups in their guerrilla war against Israelis. In the economic sphere, neo-Ba'athists favoured the establishment of a socialist command economic system; and advocated the nationalization of private industries and radical land confiscation policies.

Neo-Ba'athism advocated the creation of a "vanguard" of leftist revolutionaries committed to build an egalitarian, socialist state in Syria and other Arab countries before making steps to achieve pan-Arab unity. The vanguard organisation in neo-Ba'athist ideology was the Arab Socialist Ba'ath party; which advocated class-struggle against the traditional Syrian economic elite classes; the big agriculturalists, industrialists, bourgeoisie and feudal landlords. By the 1970s, 85% of agricultural lands were distributed to landless peasant populations and tenant farmers. Banks, oil companies, power production and 90% of large-scale industries were nationalised. The neo-Ba'athists faction led by Salah Jadid concentrated on organizing the Syrian economy along socialist lines and exporting the doctrines of class-conflict and militant socialist revolution to the neighbouring countries. This view was challenged by General Hafez al-Assad and his neo-Ba'ath faction; who were proponents of a military-centric approach and focused on a strategy of strengthening the Syrian military to defend the socialist government against imperialist forces and their alleged internal collaborators. Assad favoured reconciliation of various leftist factions and pursued better relations with other Arab states. Although majority of the party members favoured Salah, Hafez was able to gain the upperhand following the events of the 1970 coup dubbed the "Corrective Revolution" in official Syrian Ba'ath history. Assad's victory also marked the supersedure of the military over the Ba'ath party structures; making the armed forces a central centre of political power.

The 6th National Congress of the Ba'ath party declared the party's ideological end-goal to be the socialist transformation of society through a Leninist strategy. Some Theoretical Propositions, a core ideological document adopted by the congress stated: "Socialism is the true goal of Arab unity. ... Arab unity is the obligatory basis for constructing a socialist society." Thus, neo-Ba'athists viewed pan-Arabism as a means to achieve their radical socialist objectives.

=== Stance on religion ===
Neo-Ba'athism views religion as the "foremost symbol of reaction" preventing the birth of a modern socialist society, and advocates strict state supervision over religious activities for sustaining what its ideologues regard as a healthy, secularist society. During Salah Jadid's reign in power, the Ba'ath postured itself as a strongly anti-religious political entity; adhering to the Marxist–Leninist approach of top-down regimentation of the society through liquidation of what it regarded as "reactionary" classes such as the traditional ulema. The Grand Mufti's official status was downgraded by the Ba'athist government and the conventional role of religious clergy in state functioning was curtailed. While state ministers, officials, educators, etc. regularly preached about the "perils of religion"; party periodicals and magazines during the 1960s regularly made predictions about the "impending demise" of religion through the socialist revolution.

During the rule of Salah Jadid, neo-Ba'athist ideologues openly denounced religion as a source of what they considered as the backwardness of the Arabs. Following popular revulsion at Jadid's blatant anti-religious policies, Hafez al-Assad began to tone down the secularisation programme during the 1970s, by co-opting some pro-government clerics like Ramadan al-Bouti to counter the Islamic opposition and granted them a degree of autonomy from the regime. Simultaneously, the regime began the "nationalization" of religious discourse through a loyal clerical network, and condemned anyone deviating from the state-promoted "Ba'thist version of Islam" as a threat to the society. The state-sponsored religious discourse during the rule of Hafez al-Assad promoted a left-wing nationalist worldview that sought to anathematize Islamists and re-inforce loyalty towards the Alawite president.

=== Criticism ===
Salah al-Din al-Bitar, a member of the classical Ba'athist leadership, stated that the 1966 Syrian coup d'état "marked the end of Ba'athist politics in Syria". Ba'ath party founder Michel Aflaq shared the sentiment by stating, "I no longer recognise my party!"

According to Jamal al-Atassi, co-founder of the Arab Ba'ath Party, stated that "Assadism is a false nationalism. It's the domination of a minority, and I'm not talking just of the Alawites, who control the society's nervous system. I include also the army and the mukhabarat. [...] And despite its socialist slogans, the state is run by a class who has made a fortune without contributing—a nouvelle bourgeoisie parasitaire."

President of the United Arab Republic, Gamal Abdel Nasser, accused the neo-Ba'athists of Syria of anti-religion and sectarianism.

== History ==
=== Neo-Ba'athist domination of Syrian Ba'ath party: 1963 – 66 ===
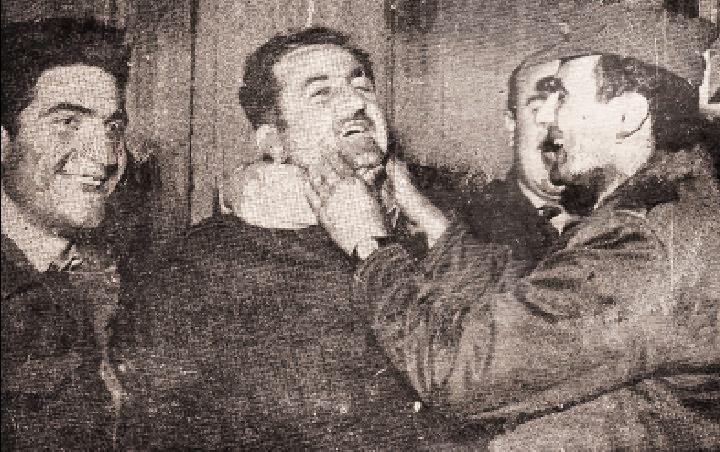
Military Committee members Salim Hatum (left), Muhammad Umran (center) and Salah Jadid (right) celebrating after the 1963 coup d'état

Following the seizure of power in 1963 by the neo-Ba'athist military committee, the Syrian regional branch of the Ba'ath party experienced severe factionalism and splintering, leading to a succession of governments and new constitutions. One of the most consequential outcomes of the coup and subsequent purges was the dominance of Alawite commanders in the neo-Ba'athist officer corps, who assumed control of the Ba'athist Syrian military forces. The neo-Ba'athist radicals, who dominated the Syrian regional structures of the Ba'ath party, initiated a power struggle against the party's old guard, culminating in the 1966 neo-Ba'athist coup.

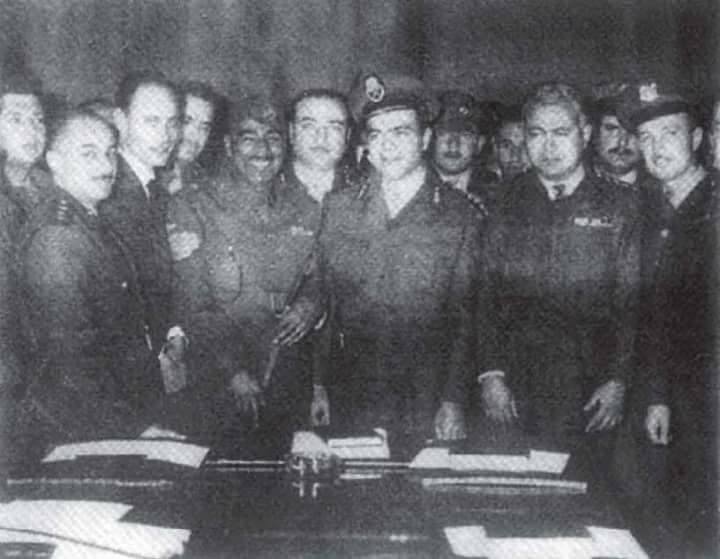
Syrian army officers, 1963

The neo-Ba'athist military officers, through their increased political and military influence, began initiating purges across bureaucratic structures of the Syrian state and rapidly monopolized control over various organs of the Syrian Ba'ath party. Military Ba'athists also took control of the National Council for the Revolutionary Command (NCRC), which exercised the de-facto power in the new Ba'athist regime in Syria. Civilian wing of the Ba'ath party, consisting of classical Ba'athists led by Aflaq and Bitar, had little influence over the ideological direction of the Syrian regional branch. During the sixth national congress of the Ba'ath party, officers of the Ba'athist military committee, in collaboration with radical leftists, formally gained ideological and political control of the Syrian regional branch of the Ba'ath party. The ideological programme and political platform adopted by the Syrian Ba'ath party during the 6th National Congress of the Ba'ath party in September 1963 became the official doctrine of the neo-Ba'ath and the state ideology of Ba'athist Syria. Subsequently, the Ba'athist regime began implementing its social, economic and political policies across Syria, which imposed the neo-Ba'athist agenda.

The neo-Ba'athist tendency gained control of the Syrian regional branch at the Ba'ath party's 6th National Congress of 1963, where hardliners from the dominant Syrian and Iraqi regional parties joined forces to impose a radical leftist line, which advocated the imposition of "socialist planning", "collective farms run by peasants", "workers' democratic control of the means of production", a party based on workers and peasants, and other demands reflecting emulation of Soviet-style socialism. In a coded attack on Michel Aflaq, the congress also condemned "ideological notability", criticizing his middle-class background, within the party. Aflaq, angry at this transformation of his party, retained a nominal leadership role, but the National Command as a whole came under the control of the radicals.

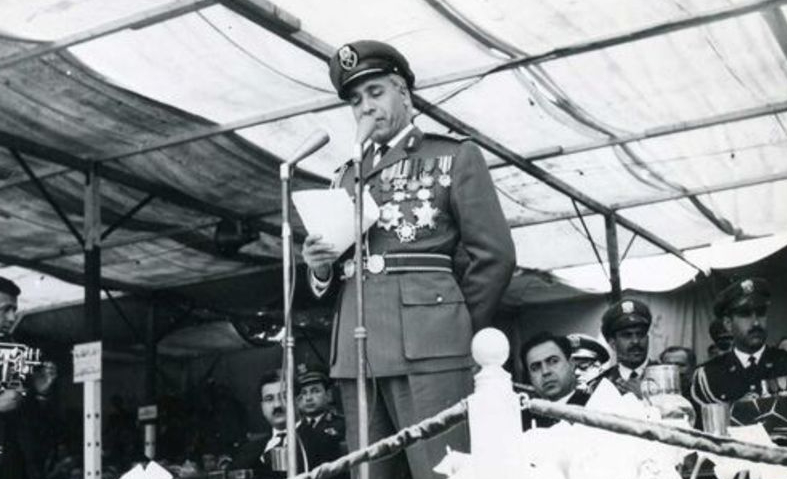
Speech of the Amin al-Hafiz, president of the NCRC (military junta which came to power after 1963 coup)

In line with their clandestine vanguardist nature, the neo-Ba'athists ignored efforts to gain popular support and moved to consolidate their control over the Ba'athist Syrian military apparatus. Hundreds of Syrian military officers were purged, and neo-Ba'athist recruits were installed at senior positions of the Syrian Arab Armed Forces. Most of the newly recruited Ba'athist officers came from the countryside or from a low social class. The neo-Ba'athist officer corps had a predominantly rural background and many Ba'athist recruits were "the kinsmen of the leading minority officers". The neo-Ba'athist movement had a minoritarian character and was dominated by Alawite, Druze, and Isma'ili rural recruits from the countryside. Its opponents were primarily Sunni Muslims and non-Sunnis from urban backgrounds.

After pushing out the Aflaqites during the 6th National Ba'ath Party Congress, the Military Committee and its supporters incorporated a new radicalized form of Ba'athism – a Ba'athism strongly influenced by Marxism–Leninism - as the official ideology of the Syrian regional branch of the Ba'ath party. This new form of Ba'athism laid emphasis on "revolution in one country" rather than the classical Ba'athist goal of a Pan-Arab union. At the same time, the 6th National Congress implemented a resolution which stressed the implementation of a socialist revolution in Syria. Under this form of socialism, neo-Ba'athists envisioned the establishment of a Soviet-style command economic system, the nationalization of banks, foreign trade, large and medium industries, etc. as well as the replacement of private enterprise with state planning and investment. They believed these policies would end exploitation of labour, that capitalism would disappear, and in agriculture they envisioned a plan were land was given "to he who works it". These changes and more refashioned the Syrian Ba'ath Party into a Leninist organization.

Syrian Ba'ath party's left-wing argued that the bourgeoisie could never be won over unless they were given total control over the economy. It was this power struggle between the Aflaqites who dominated the National Command of the Ba'ath Party and the radicals who dominated the Syrian Regional Command of the Ba'ath Party which led to the neo-Ba'athist coup d'état in 1966. Between 1963 and 1966, neo-Ba'athist radicals, who controlled the Ba'athist Syrian military apparatus, steadily amassed power and influence within the Syrian regional wing of the Ba'ath party.

According to Munif al-Razzaz, the last secretary general of the National Command of the original Ba'ath Party, from 1961 onwards, there existed two Ba'ath parties – "the military Ba'ath Party and the Ba'ath Party, and real power lay with the former." He also argued that the military Ba'ath was "little more than a military clique with civilian hangers-on; and that from the initial founding of the Military Committee by disgruntled Syrian officers exiled in Cairo in 1959, the chain of events and the total corruption of Ba'athism proceeded with intolerable logic."

=== 1966 Neo-Ba'athist coup and Ba'ath Party schism ===
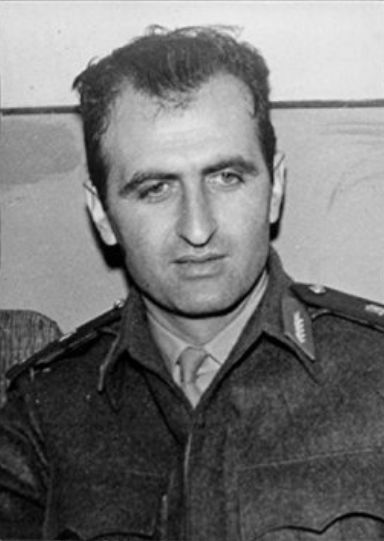
Salah Jadid, leader of the 1966 Neo-Ba'athist coup

1966 neo-Ba'athist coup d'état marked the complete structural transformation of the Ba'ath party's Syrian regional branch into a militarist neo-Ba'ath organization which became independent of the National Command of the original Ba'ath party. Following its violent seizure of power, which resulted in the killing of approximately 400 people, the neo-Ba'athist military committee purged the old guard Ba'athist leaders like Michel Aflaq and Salah al-Din Bitar. This coup led to a permanent schism between the Syrian and Iraqi regional branches of the Ba'ath Party, and many Syrian Ba'athist leaders defected to Iraq.

The ousting of Aflaq, Bitar, and the National Command became the deepest schism in the Ba'ath movement's history. The 1966 coup brought a new generation of radical leftist leaders to power who had different ideological aims than their predecessors. While Aflaq and Bitar still had supporters in Syria and in non-Syrian Regional Branches, they were hampered by the lack of financial means – the neo-Ba'athist Syrian Regional Branch of the Ba'ath party had funded them since 1963. Jadid and his supporters now had the Ba'athist Syrian state under their formal political control. While neo-Ba'athists were theoretically able to establish new party organisations or coerce pro-Aflaq opinion, this failed to work since most of the regional branches of the Ba'ath party changed their allegiance to Baghdad. Later in 1966, the first post-Aflaqite National Congress, officially designated the 9th, was held, and a new National Command was elected. Following the 1966 neo-Ba'athist coup, the National Command became subservient in all but name to the Syrian Regional Command, and ceased to have an effective role in Arab or Syrian politics.

Following the exile of the National Command, some of its members, including Hafiz, convened the 9th Ba'ath National Congress (to differentiate it from the Syrian "9th National Congress") and elected a new National Command, with Aflaq, who did not attend the congress, as the National Command's Secretary General. For those like Bitar and Razzaz, the exile from Syria was too hard, and they left the party. Michel Aflaq moved to Brazil, remaining there until 1968.

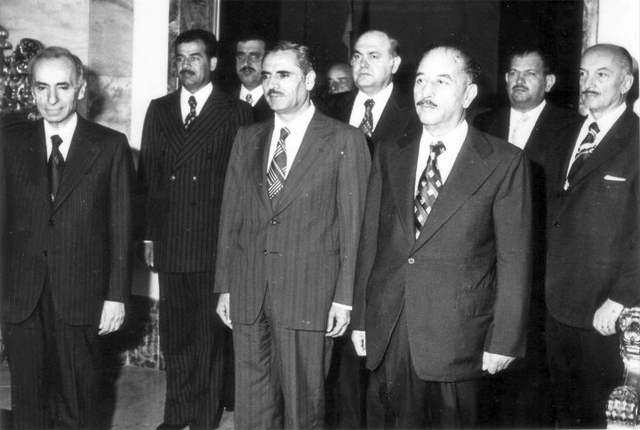
National Command of the Iraqi Ba'ath party.

When the National Command of the Ba'ath party was toppled in 1966, the Iraqi Regional Branch of the Ba'ath party remained supportive of what it viewed as the "legitimate leadership" of Michel Aflaq. When the Iraqi Ba'ath party gained power in 1968 in the 17 July Revolution no attempts were made at a merger, to achieve their supposed goal of Arab unity, or reconciliation with the Syrian Ba'ath. After the establishment of Ba'ath rule in Iraq, many members of the Syrian-dominated Ba'ath movement defected to its Iraqi-counterpart, few if any Iraqi-loyal Ba'athists attempted to change its allegiance to Damascus. The reason for this was that those defecting from Damascus were loyal to the old, Aflaqite National Command. Several older members such as Bitar, Hafiz, Shibli al-Aysami and Elias Farah, either visited Iraq or sent a congratulatory message to Ahmed Hassan al-Bakr, the Regional Secretary of the Iraqi Regional Command. Aflaq did not visit Iraq until 1969, but from late 1970, he would become a leading Iraqi Ba'ath official, although he never acquired any decision-making power.

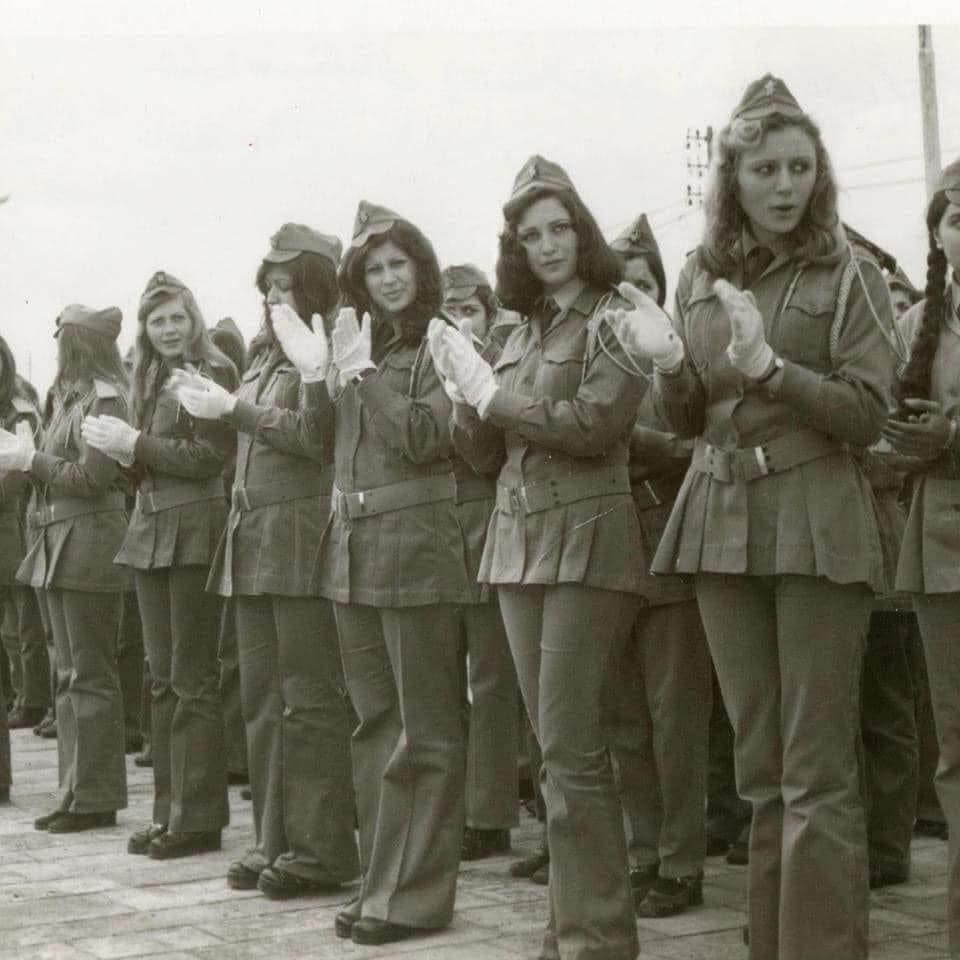
Military demonstration of the neo-Ba'athist Syrian regime

From the beginning, the neo-Ba'athist regime in Damascus launched an overwhelmingly anti-Iraqi Ba'athist propaganda campaign, to which their counterparts in Baghdad responded. The Syrian Ba'ath party denounced Aflaq as a "thief" and claimed that he had stolen the Ba'athist ideology from Zaki al-Arsuzi and proclaimed it as his own, with Assad hailing Arsuzi as the principal founder of Ba'athist thought. The Iraqi Regional Branch, however, still proclaimed Aflaq as the founder of Ba'athism. Assad referred to Arsuzi as the "greatest Syrian of his day" and claimed him to be the "first to conceive of the Ba'ath as a political movement." Bitar was sentenced to death "in absentia" in 1969, and Aflaq was condemned to death in absentia in 1971 by Assad's regime. The Syrian Regional Branch also erected a statue of Arsuzi not long after the 1966 coup. Nevertheless, the majority of Ba'athists outside Syria continued to view Aflaq, not Arsuzi, as the principal founder of Ba'athism.

When the Iraqi Ba'ath party seized power in 1968, the Syrian Ba'ath party responded by not mentioning in its press release that a Ba'athist organisation had taken power in Iraq. For instance, it mentioned that Bakr became president of Iraq, but did not mention his party affiliation, and instead referred to the incident as a military coup. While the Syrian Ba'ath denied giving any legitimacy to Iraqi Ba'ath, the Iraqi Ba'athists were more conciliatory. The anti-Iraqi Ba'athist propaganda reached new heights within Ba'athist Syria at the same time that Assad was strengthening his position within the party and state.

=== Assadist-Jadidist conflict: 1966 – 1970 ===
After the 1967 Six-Day War, tensions between Salah Jadid and Hafez al-Assad increased, and al-Assad and his associates were strengthened by their hold on the military. In late 1968, Assadists began dismantling Jadid's support network, facing ineffectual resistance from the civilian branch of the party that remained under Jadid's control.

=== Assadist rule: 1970 – 2024 ===
==== 1970 Assadist coup d'etat ====
The dual polarisation of power in Ba'athist Syria between Hafez al-Assad and Salah Jadid persisted until the Assadist coup of November 1970, when al-Assad ousted and imprisoned Atassi and Jadid. He then set upon a project of rapid institution-building, reopened parliament and adopted a permanent constitution for the country, which had been ruled by military fiat and a provisional constitutional documents since 1963.

==== Yom Kippur war ====
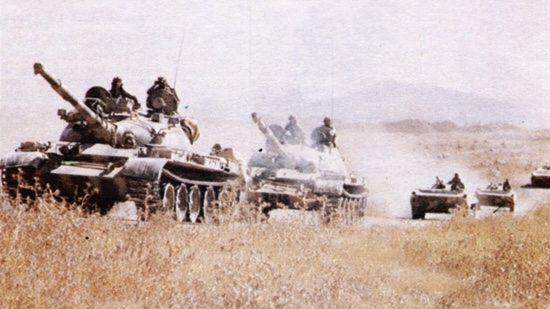
Column of Syrian tanks and armoured vehicles invade Golan Heights.

Hafez al-Assad's reign was marked by the virtual abandonment of Pan-Arab ideology; replacing it with the doctrine of socialist transformation and giving overriding priority in constructing socialist society within Syria. Political participation was limited to the National Progressive Front, the ruling coalition of Syrian Baath and Marxist–Leninist parties; entrenching itself firmly within the Soviet Bloc. The Party also began building a personality cult around Assad and brought the elite of the armed forces under Assad's grip and the officer corps were installed with Alawite loyalists, further alienating the Sunni majority from the party. When Hafez al-Assad came to power in 1971, the army began to modernize and change. In the first 10 years of Assad's rule, the army increased by 162%, and by 264% by 2000. In the early 1970s, 70% of the country's budget went only to the army. On 6 October 1973, Syria and Egypt initiated the Yom Kippur War against Israel. The Israel Defense Forces, with difficulty, but successfully reversed the initial Syrian gains. In an attempt to reach Damascus, the Israeli army again invaded Syrian territory, but mounting casualties and the Syrian war of attrition forced them to abandon these plans. The village of Quneitra was largely destroyed by the Israeli army.

==== Islamist uprising in Syria ====
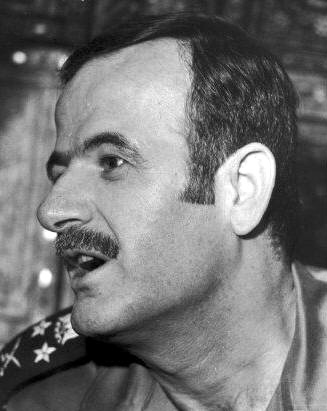
Photo of Syrian military general Hafez al-Assad during the 1970 coup

Bitterness towards the Assadist regime and the Alawite elite in the neo-Ba'ath and armed forces became widespread amongst the Sunni majority, laying the beginnings of an Islamic resistance. Prominent leaders of Muslim Brotherhood like Issam al-Attar were imprisoned and exiled. A coalition of the traditional Syrian Sunni ulema, Muslim Brotherhood revolutionaries and Islamist activists formed the Syrian Islamic Front in 1980 with objective of overthrowing Assad through Jihad and establishing an Islamic state. In the same year, Hafez officially supported Iran in its war with Iraq and controversially began importing Iranian fighters and terror groups into Lebanon and Syria. This led to rising social tensions within the country which eventually became a full-fledged Islamist rebellion in 1982; led by the Islamic Front. The regime responded by slaughtering the Sunni inhabitants in Hama and Aleppo and bombarding numerous mosques, killing around 20,000–40,000 civilians. The uprising was brutally crushed and Assad regarded the Muslim Brethren as demolished.

==== Soviet alliance ====
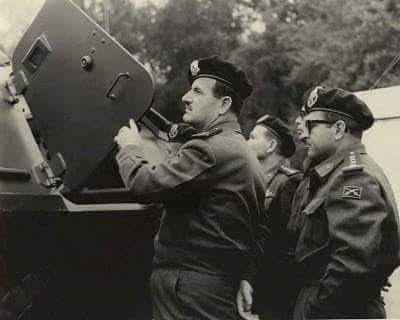
Hafez Assad inspects armored vehicle, supplied by the Soviet Union.

Syria under Hafez al-Assad was a staunch Soviet ally and firmly aligned itself with Soviet Bloc during the height of the Cold War. Soviet Union saw Syria as the lynchpin of its Middle-East strategy and signed the Treaty of Friendship and Co-operation in 1980; directly committing itself to Syria's defense and incorporating the Syrian armed forces into Soviet standards. For his part, Hafez committed himself to socialist economic and foreign policies; and was one of the few autocrats to openly support the Soviet invasion of Afghanistan. The end of the Cold War and collapse of the Soviet Union dealt a deep blow to Assad, who retained the nostalgia for the old Soviet-led socialist order. Assad continued to rule Syria until his death in 2000, by centralizing powers in the state presidency.

==== Syrian occupation of Lebanon ====
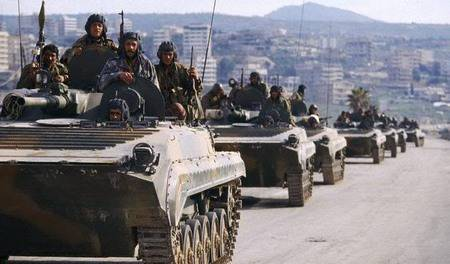
Syrian BMP-1 column in Lebanon

Syria was invited into Lebanon by its president, Suleiman Frangieh, in 1976, to intervene on the side of the Lebanese government against Palestine Liberation Organization guerilla fighters and Lebanese Maronite forces amid the Lebanese Civil War. The Arab Deterrent Force originally consisted of a Syrian core, up to 25,000 troops, with participation by some other Arab League states totaling only around 5,000 troops. In late 1978, after the Arab League had extended the mandate of the Arab Deterrent Force, the Sudanese, the Saudis and the United Arab Emirates announced intentions to withdraw troops from Lebanon, extending their stay into the early months of 1979 at the Lebanese government's request. The Libyan troops were essentially abandoned and had to find their own way home, and the ADF thereby became a purely Syrian force, although it did include the Palestine Liberation Army. A year after Israel invaded and occupied Southern Lebanon during the 1982 Lebanon War, the Lebanese government failed to extend the ADF's mandate, thereby effectively ending its existence, although not the Syrian or Israeli military presence in Lebanon. Eventually the Syrian presence became known as the Syrian occupation of Lebanon.

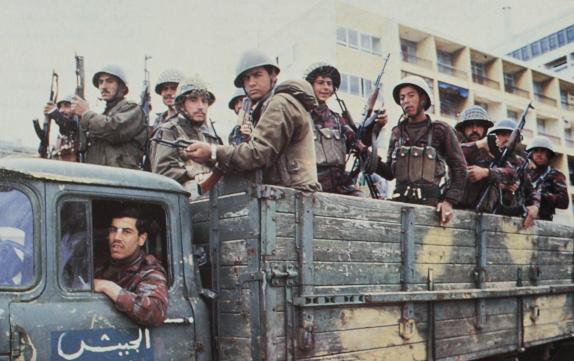
Syrian troops in Beirut during War of the Camps

Syrian forces lingered in Lebanon throughout the civil war in Lebanon, eventually bringing most of the nation under Syrian control as part of a power struggle with Israel, which had occupied areas of southern Lebanon in 1978. In 1985, Israel began to withdraw from Lebanon, as a result of domestic opposition in Israel and international pressure. In the aftermath of this withdrawal, the War of the Camps broke out, with Syria fighting their former Palestinian allies. The Syrian occupation of Lebanon continued until 2005.

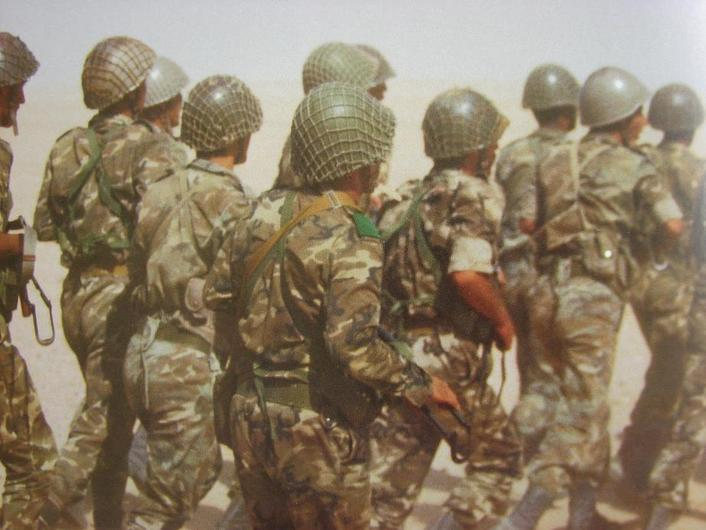
Syrian soldiers during the Gulf war, 1991

==== Diplomatic efforts ====
In a major shift in relations with both other Arab states and the Western world, Syria participated in the United States-led Gulf War against Saddam Hussein. The country participated in the multilateral Madrid Conference of 1991, and during the 1990s engaged in negotiations with Israel along with Palestine and Jordan. These negotiations failed, and there have been no further direct Syrian-Israeli talks since President Hafiz al-Assad's meeting with then President Bill Clinton in Geneva in 2000.

=== Bashar al-Assad's presidency ===
Hafez al-Assad died on 10 June 2000. His son, Bashar al-Assad, was elected president in an election in which he ran unopposed. His election saw the birth of the Damascus Spring and hopes of reform, but by autumn 2001, the authorities had suppressed the movement, imprisoning some of its leading intellectuals. Instead, reforms were limited to some market reforms. In March 2004, Syrian Kurds and Arabs clashed in the northeastern city of al-Qamishli. Signs of rioting were seen in the cities of Qamishli and Hasakeh. In 2005, Syria ended its military presence in Lebanon. Assassination of Rafic Hariri in 2005 led to international condemnation and triggered a popular Intifada in Lebanon, known as "the Cedar Revolution" which forced the Assad regime to withdraw its 20,000 Syrian soldiers in Lebanon and end its 29-year-long military occupation of Lebanon.

==== Syrian revolution and civil war ====
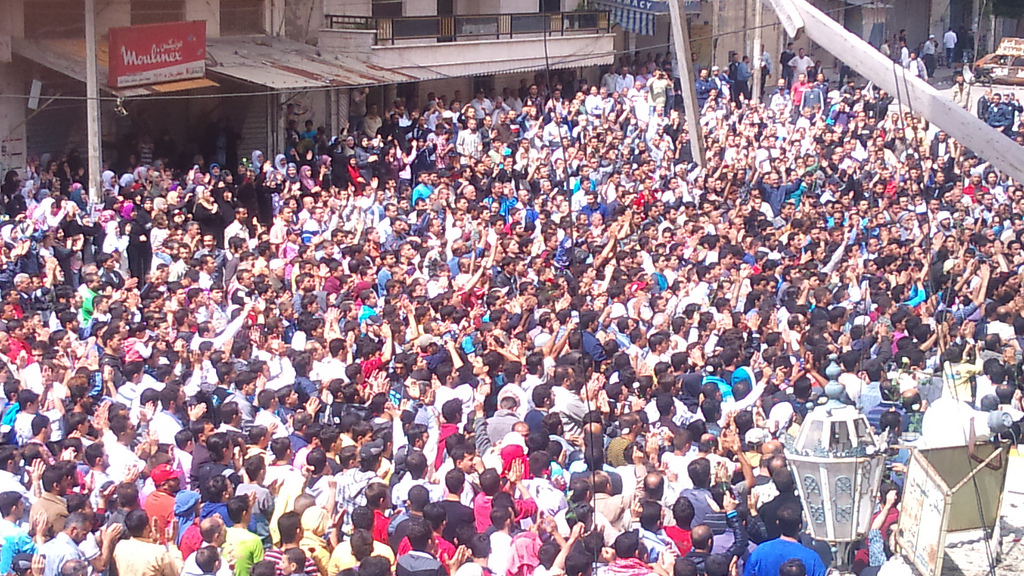
Anti-regime demonstrations in 2011

The Syrian revolution and began in 2011 as a part of the wider Arab Spring, a wave of upheaval throughout the Arab World. Public demonstrations across Syria began on 26 January 2011 and developed into a nationwide uprising. Protesters demanded the resignation of President Bashar al-Assad, the overthrow of his government, and an end to nearly five decades of Ba’ath Party rule. From spring 2011, the Syrian government deployed the Syrian Army to quell the uprising, and several cities were besieged, though the unrest continued. According to some witnesses, soldiers, who refused to open fire on civilians, were summarily executed by the Syrian Army.

==== Government collapse ====
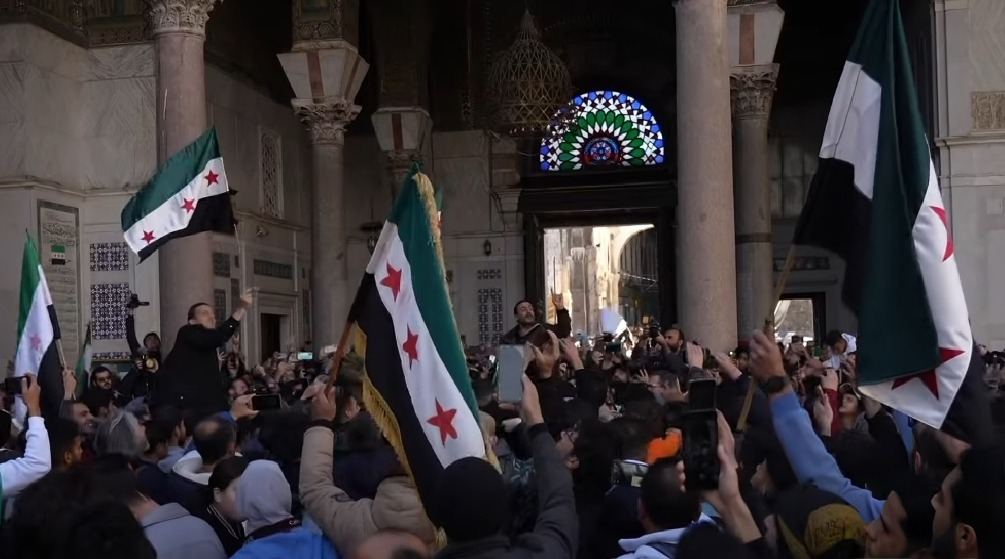
Celebrations at Umayyad Mosque following the fall of the Assad regime in December 2024

On 27 November 2024, violence flared up once again. Rebel factions, led by the Islamist group Hayat Tahrir al-Sham (HTS) and the Turkish-backed Syrian National Army (SNA), had taken control of Aleppo, prompting a retaliatory airstrike campaign by Syrian President Bashar al-Assad, supported by Russia. The rebel offensive, which had begun on 27 November 2024, continued its advance into Hama Province following their capture of Aleppo. The government of Bashar al-Assad was overthrown on 8 December 2024 after the capture of Damascus by the Syrian opposition. The Baath party suspended its activities in Syria after Islamist-led rebel forces toppled Assad's government.

=== Insurgency in Syria ===
By late December 2024, an an insurgency from loyalists of Ba'athist Syria emerged against the new Syrian caretaker government. On December 26, 2024, Mohammad Kanjo Hassan, former Syrian major general and one of the leaders of the insurgency, was arrested in the town of Khirbet al-Ma'zah along with 20 of his loyalists.

Then in March 2025, major clashes erupted as part of the insurgency, with major fighting around Latakia. One of the groups involved was the Military Council for the Liberation of Syria, which was an armed coalition of former officers and loyalists to Ba'athist Syria.

== See also ==
- Gaddafi loyalism
- March 2025 Western Syria clashes
