= Ziad al-Hariri =

Syrian politician (1929–2015)

Major General Ziad al-Hariri
- زياد الحريري
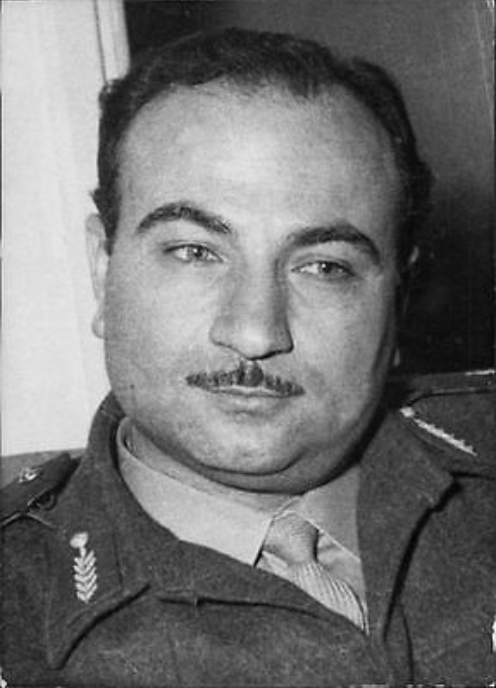

Chief of General Staff of the Syrian Arab Armed Forces
- In office 8 March 1963 – 8 July 1963
- Prime Minister: Khalid al-Azm; Salah al-Din Bitar
- Preceded by: Abd al-Karim Zahr al-Din
- Succeeded by: Salah Jadid

6th Minister of Defense
- In office 2 May 1963 – 8 July 1963
- Preceded by: Muhammad al-Sufi
- Succeeded by: Muhammad Umran

Personal details
- Born: 1929 Hama, State of Damascus, Mandate for Syria and the Lebanon
- Died: 2 September 2015 (aged 85–86) Damascus, Syria
- Party: Independent

Military service
- Allegiance: First Syrian Republic (1948–1950); Second Syrian Republic (1950–1958); United Arab Republic (1958–1961); Second Syrian Republic (1961–1963); Ba'athist Syria (1963)
- Branch/service: Syrian Arab Armed Forces
- Years of service: 1948–1963
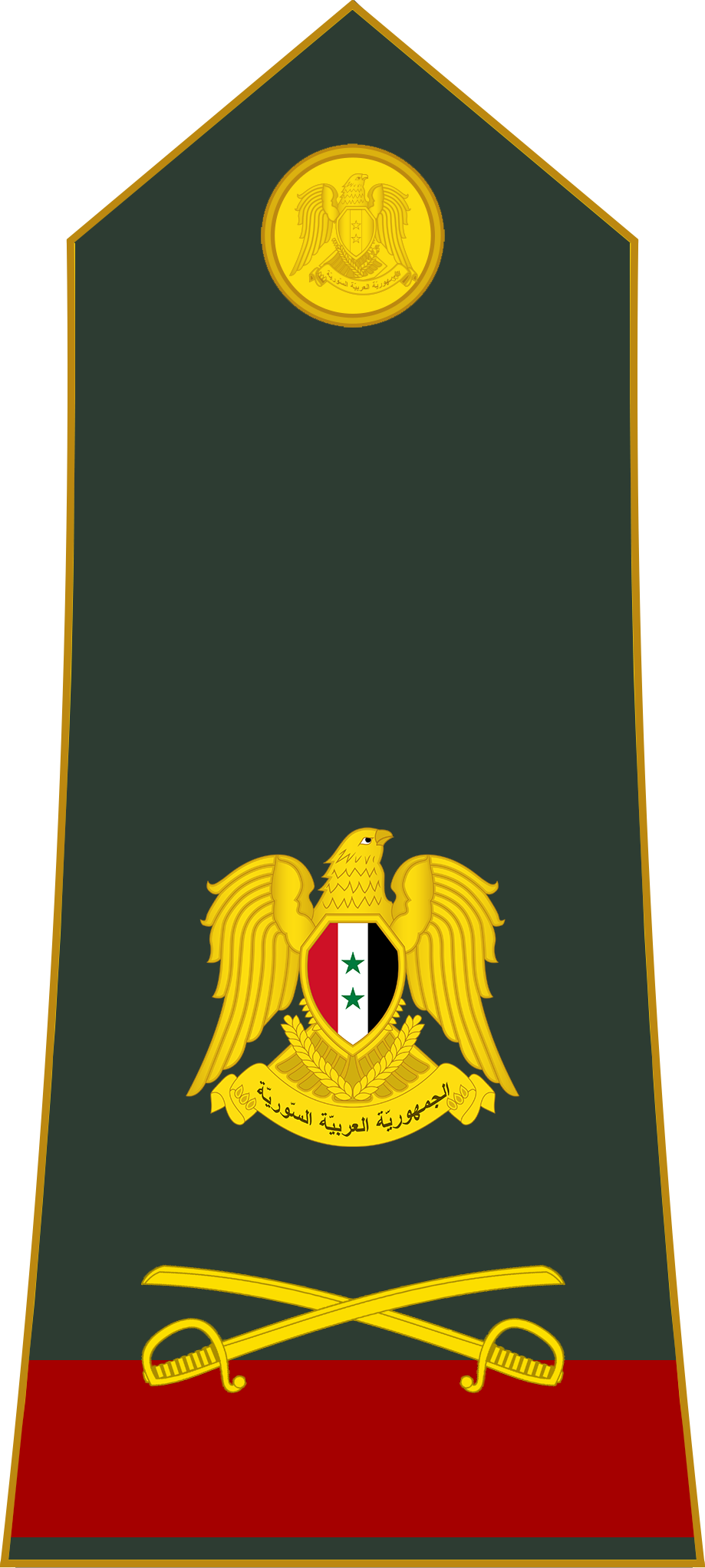
- Rank: Major general
- Commands: General Staff of the Syrian Arab Armed Forces

Mohammed Ziad al-Hariri (1929 – 2 September 2015) was a Syrian Arab Army officer. A staunch Arab nationalist, he supported the union between Syria and Egypt in 1958, opposed Syria's secession from it in 1961 and served as the chief leader of the coup d'état that toppled the secessionist government in March 1963. Politically independent from the Nasserists and their Ba'athist rivals, Hariri served as the army's chief of staff following the coup and was briefly defense minister until being dismissed during a wide-scale purge of non-Ba'athists from the military. He retired from political activity soon afterward.

== Early life ==
Hariri was born to a Sunni Muslim Arab family from the town of Hama in 1929. His father was a major landowner in nearby Homs, and was sympathetic to the politics of the communist national leader Khalid al-Azm. Hariri's brother was also sympathetic to communism and was a locally known poet in Syria. Hariri's brother-in-law was the prominent Arab socialist politician Akram al-Hawrani, who was also a Hama native.

== Military and political career ==
Hariri entered the Homs Military Academy in the early 1950s and became an officer in the Syrian Army in 1954, during the presidency of Adib al-Shishakli. During this period he became active in the growing pan-Arabist movement led by Egyptian president Gamal Abdel Nasser. Hariri supported the formation of the United Arab Republic (UAR) in February 1958. Along with many other Syrian officers, he was sent to be stationed in Egypt, a post he resented. He would later state that he felt he and his comrades "were in an inferior position and we did not know why." After the union's breakup in 1961, following a secessionist coup in Syria, he became a staunch opponent of the new government of President Nazim al-Qudsi. At the time, Hariri, a staff colonel, had been reassigned to commander of the army on the southern front with Israel. It was both a prestigious title and a strategic post as Hariri headed the largest concentration of Syrian troops in the country.

For two years Hariri actively opposed the secessionist government and worked to restore the union with Egypt, gaining the support of Nasserist and politically independent Arab nationalist officers in the army. Sometime in the middle of 1962, the Military Committee of the Ba'ath Party, which ostensibly favored the restoration of the UAR, offered Hariri the position of army chief of staff if he gave the Ba'athists his support in overthrowing Qudsi's government. Should the coup attempt fail, the committee guaranteed Hariri could "disown" them. Tensions had been rising between Hariri and Prime Minister Khalid al-Azm, and Hariri feared Azm was going to dismiss him as front commander and appoint him as the military attaché in Baghdad, where he could wield little influence over events in Syria. When Azm did nominate him for the position, Hariri refused and was accused of being a "rebel" by the government.

=== 1963 coup and aftermath ===
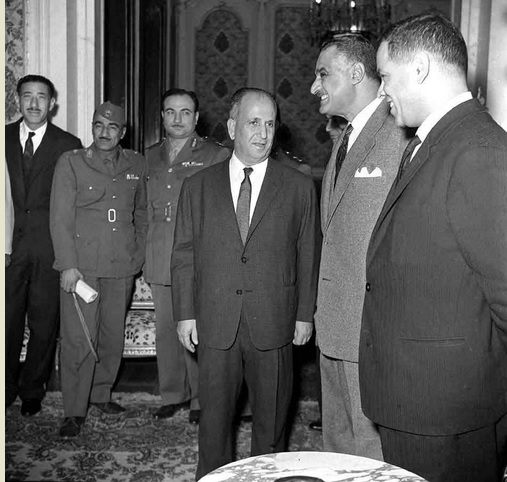
A gathering of delegates for the April triparitite unity talks between Egypt, Syria and Iraq. Hariri is third from left and Egyptian president Gamal Abdel Nasser is second from right

Hariri accepted the Military Committee's offer and on the night of 7–8 March 1963, he played a prominent role in the toppling of Qudsi and Azm. Hariri led the armored forces from the front line with Israel towards the Syrian capital, Damascus, while pro-government brigades at Qatana and al-Kiswah, on the outskirts of the city, were neutralized by unionist forces. Hariri's troops installed barricades blocking strategic roads in the city, and besieged several government buildings, including the main post office. By the morning of 8 March, the coup was completed with virtually no blood spilled and the chief unionist officers gathered at army headquarters in Damascus to celebrate its quick success. Syria expert Patrick Seale referred to Hariri as the "chief coup maker." Hariri was promoted to Major-General, became a member of the Revolutionary Command Council (RCC) that governed the country and, as planned, was appointed the army's chief of staff. To Hariri's chagrin, the Military Committee became the underlying power in Syria instead of Hariri serving as the country's strongman. Under the committee's influence, the RCC appointed officer Lu'ay al-Atassi as president and Ba'athist co-founder Salah al-Din Bitar as prime minister.

Meanwhile, tensions between the Nasserists and the Ba'athists soared after the latter were seen by the former as reneging on a unity agreement signed in April with Iraq—where a Ba'athist-Nasserist alliance had taken power in February—and Egypt. Hariri had taken part in the negotiations in Cairo. Towards the end of April, dozens of Nasserist officers were purged from the army, prompting the resignation of six Nasserist RCC members, or half the council, in protest. The sidelining of the Nasserists, including Defense Minister Muhammad al-Sufi, resulted in Hariri's acquisition of the defense ministry portfolio. Together with his position as chief of staff, the defense ministry post gave Hariri highly strategic control over the army. This was seen as a major impediment to the Military Committee's plans to consolidate unchecked power in the armed forces. Tensions between Hariri, a political independent, and the Ba'athists, remained latent until several of Hariri's allies, including some thirty elite officers under his command, were discharged on the orders of Amin al-Hafiz, the Ba'athist interior minister on 23 June. Hariri had been sent to Algeria on 19 June with a high-ranking delegation, including Bitar, Aflaq and Education Minister Sami Droubi, just prior to the purge and was unable to personally intervene.

Hariri was subsequently dismissed as chief of staff and was officially reassigned to the post of military attache in Washington D.C. He was instructed to head to the Syrian embassy in Washington directly and not to return to Damascus, which he did nevertheless. He refused the position and left Syria for France on 8 July to avoid the repercussions from the Ba'athist officers. Prime Minister Bitar was known to sympathize with Hariri, and accompanied him to the Damascus International Airport, with Bitar reportedly having tears in his eyes. Bitar and the civilian Ba'athist leadership viewed Hariri as a counterweight to the Military Committee, who Bitar feared would now have unrestricted control over his government's decisions. Hariri's self-imposed exile marked the end of his political and military career.

Al-Hariri died in Damascus on 2 September 2015, and buried in Hama.

== Bibliography ==
- Beeri, Eliezer (1970). Army Officers in Arab Politics and Society. Praeger.
- Commins, David D. (2004). Historical Dictionary of Syria. Scarecrow Press. ISBN 978-0810849341. Archived from the original on 2 April 2023.
- Haddad, George M. (1973). Revolutions and Military Rule in the Middle East. Vol. 3. Speller. ISBN 9780831500610. Archived from the original on 29 December 2022.
- Moubayed, Sami M. (2006). Steel & Silk: Men and Women who shaped Syria 1900–2000. Cune Press. ISBN 978-1885942418. Archived from the original on 29 December 2022.
- Mufti, Malik (1996). Sovereign Creations: Pan-Arabism and Political Order in Syria and Iraq. Cornell University Press. ISBN 0801431689. "Alwan Syria 1962."
- Rabinovich, Itamar (1972). Syria Under the Baʻth, 1963–66: The Army Party Symbiosis. Transaction Publishers. ISBN 9780706512663. Archived from the original on 2 April 2023.
- Seale, Patrick (1990). Asad of Syria: The Struggle for the Middle East. University of California Press. p. 74. ISBN 978-0520069763. "Ziad Hariri."
