= Sami Droubi =

Syrian politician (1921-1976)

- سامي الدروبي
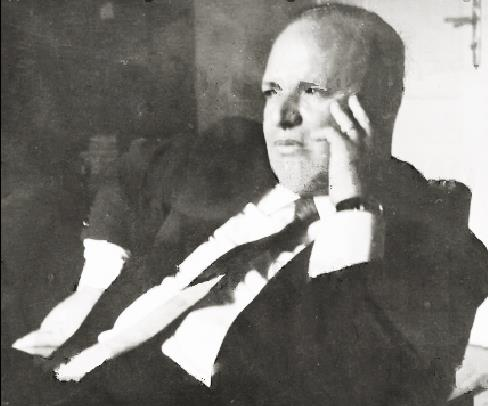

Minister of Education and Culture
- In office 9 March 1963 – April 1963
- Prime Minister: Salah al-Din Bitar
- Preceded by: Rashad Barmada
- Succeeded by: Shibli al-Aysami

Ambassador to Morocco
- In office September 1963 – December 1964

Ambassador to Yugoslavia
- In office December 1964 – February 1966

Ambassador to Egypt
- In office April 1966 – November 1970

Ambassador to Spain
- In office November 1971 – October 1973

Ambassador to the Holy See
- In office October 1973 – October 1975

Personal details
- Born: 1921 Homs, French Mandate of Syria
- Died: 12 February 1976 (aged 54–55) Syria
- Education: University of Paris

Sami Droubi (surname also spelled al-Durubi or al-Drubi; 1921 – 12 February 1976) was a Syrian politician, career diplomat, writer, translator, university professor and philosopher. He worked as a Syrian diplomat throughout the 1960s, serving, succession, as the Syrian ambassador to Brazil, Morocco, Yugoslavia, and Egypt and the Arab League, Spain and the Holy See. He briefly served as Education Minister in 1963. He also translated numerous literary works into Arabic.

A veteran member of the Ba'ath Party, Droubi was an advocate of socialism and pan-Arab unity. He was known to be a staunch supporter of Egyptian President Gamal Abdel Nasser, and is regarded as "one of the most acclaimed philosophers of Arab nationalism" in Syria, according to historian Sami Moubayed.

== Early life ==
Droubi was born in Homs, central Syria in 1921, during the early years of the French occupation (1920-1946). He was raised in the city, but moved to Egypt to study philosophy at the King Fuad University in Cairo. He later attained his graduate degree in philosophy at the University of Paris. He returned to Syria in 1946 to teach at the University of Damascus.

During the 1950s, Droubi joined the Ba'ath Party, when it was led by Michel Aflaq and Salah Bitar. He immediately became one of its most influential leaders in the country. In 1953, during the reign of President Adib al-Shishakli, he was imprisoned along with other Ba'athist leaders for their political views. They were released and Shishakli was overthrown in February 1954. As Egyptian President Gamal Abdel Nasser became the preeminent leader of the pan-Arabist movement in the latter half of the 1950s, Droubi was drawn to his leadership. Droubi increasingly preached pan-Arabist ideas and worked towards Arab unification, as well as call for the establishment of socialism in Syria along the lines of Egypt under Nasser.

== Diplomatic and political career ==
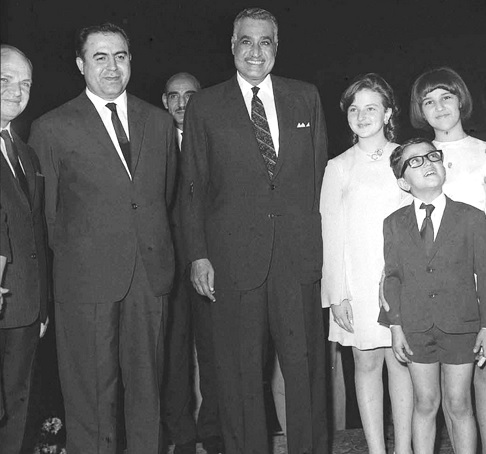
Droubi (first from left) with Presidents Nureddin al-Atassi (second from left) and Gamal Abdel Nasser (third from left) at Droubi's Cairo home, 1968. The three children are Droubi's son and two daughters

When Syria and Egypt united to form the United Arab Republic (UAR) in 1958 under Nasser's presidency, Droubi was appointed director of the Culture Ministry, and then was assigned to the UAR's embassy in Brazil to serve as its cultural consultant between 1960 and the union's dissolution by a military coup in Damascus in 1961. Afterward, Droubi returned to Syria and joined opposition to the secessionist government.

When the Syrian government was overthrown by a coalition of Arab nationalist officers organized by the Ba'athist Military Committee in March 1963, Droubi allied with the unionist junta who promised to restore the union with Egypt. In Bitar's cabinet, Droubi was made education minister. He was also a member of the National Council for the Revolutionary Command (NCRC), which effectively served as the country's interim parliament.

On 3 April, five of the six Nasserist ministers resigned from Bitar's government in protest at the Military Committee's purge of dozens of Nasserist officers. (Note: The Nasserist ministers who resigned were Nihad al-Qasim, Abd al-Wahhab Hawmad, Hani al-Hindi, Jihad Dahi and Sami Sufan. Defense Minister Muhammad al-Sufi, an independent Nasserist, resigned afterward.) In Bitar's second cabinet, formed in May, Droubi and two other pro-Nasser Ba'athist ministers (Abd al-Karim al-Zuhur and Jamal al-Atassi) were not included. Droubi kept his position in the NCRC and on 19 June was part of a high-ranking delegation that included Bitar, Aflaq and Chief-of-Staff Ziad al-Hariri, the official leader of the 1963 coup, making a state visit to Algeria. During the visit, dozens of Hariri's politically independent loyalists in the officer corps were purged by the Ba'athist's Committee. Soon after Hariri returned to Syria to respond to the purges, he too was dismissed. Droubi remained in Algiers for a while longer, but returned to Syria later that month. Droubi was highly critical of the purges and condemned the lack of progress in restoring the UAR.

In September, President Amin al-Hafiz assigned him ambassador to Morocco, until December 1964 when he reassigned as ambassador to Yugoslavia. After al-Hafiz was ousted by far-left elements of the Military Committee led by Salah Jadid in February 1966 and replaced by Nureddin al-Atassi, Atassi appointed Droubi ambassador to Egypt and Syria's representative to the Arab League on 16 April. His nomination was intended to prevent him from having influence over decision-making in Syria where he was a leading voice of opposition to Jadid's de facto rule. He condemned the expulsion of Aflaq and Bitar from Syria. When he presented his credentials to Nasser in Egypt, he reportedly wept and stated it hurt him that Egypt and Syria were still not reunited, "as if I were not in one proud day a citizen of the republic in which you were president."

Nasser died in September 1970, and Droubi was recalled to Syria in November by President Hafez al-Assad, who ousted and imprisoned Jadid and Atassi. A year later, Droubi was posted to Spain as Syria's ambassador, and then in October 1973, Assad appointed him ambassador to the Holy See of Vatican City. In October 1975, Droubi resigned from his diplomatic post and retired out of health concerns.

== Writings and translations ==
Some works translated into Arabic by Droubi include those of the Russian writer Leo Tolstoy, and the works of Yugoslav author Ivo Andrić, including The Bridge on the Drina (1961) and The Bosnian Story (1964) He translated the entire works of Russian author Fyodor Dostoyevsky and French thinker Jean-Paul Sartre. He co-wrote al-Mujaz fi Ilm al-Nafs (Concise in Psychology) with Abdullah Abd al-Daim and wrote a number of his own works including Ilm al-Nafs wal Adab (Psychology and Literature), published in Cairo in 1971.

== Death ==
Droubi died in Syria on 12 February 1976. His wife Ihssan al-Baiyat wrote his biography, Sami Al Droubi, published Dar al-Karmil in Damascus in 1982. In the late 2000s, the Syrian culture ministry established a state translation contest and award named after Droubi.

== Bibliography ==
- Higonnet, Margaret R. (1999). Lines of Fire: Women Writers of World War I. Plume. ISBN 9780452281462.
- Moubayed, Sami M. (2006). Steel & Silk: Men and Women who shaped Syria 1900–2000. Cune Press. ISBN 978-1-885942-41-8.
- Rabinovich, Itamar (1972). Syria Under the Baʻth, 1963–66: The Army Party Symbiosis. Transaction Publishers. ISBN 9780706512663. Archived from the original on 2023-04-02.
