= 1963 Syrian coup d'état =

1963 Ba'athist military coup in Syria

1963 Syrian coup d'état March 8 Revolution
- Part of the Arab Cold War
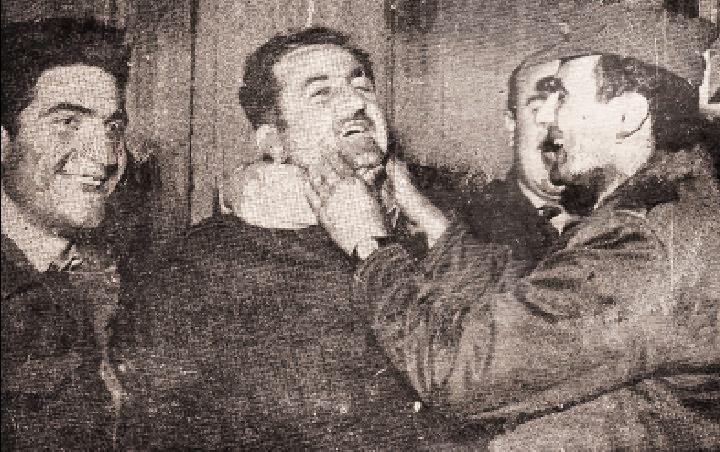
- Military Committee members Salim Hatum (left), Muhammad Umran (center) and Salah Jadid (right) celebrate the coup's success
Date	8 March 1963
Location	Syrian Arab Republic
Result	Ba'athist victory: Fall of the Second Syrian Republic; Establishment of Ba'athist Syria (until 2024), led by the National Council for the Revolutionary Command; Neo-Ba'athist and Alawite domination of the Ba'ath Party's Syrian regional branch and military apparatus

Belligerents
(Syria) Second Syrian Republic; National Party; People's Party; Muslim Brotherhood; Arab Liberation Movement	Ba'ath Party; Military Committee

Commanders and leaders
Nazim al-Qudsi (POW) (President of Syria); Khalid al-Azm (POW) (Prime Minister of Syria); Abdul Karim Zahreddine (POW) (Minister of Defense and Chief of the General Staff)	Ziad al-Hariri; Muhammad Umran; Salah Jadid; Hafez al-Assad; Muhammad al-Sufi; Jassem Alwan; Amin al-Hafiz; Salim Hatum

Casualties and losses
- No victims reported

The 1963 Syrian coup d'état, labelled in Ba'athist historiography as the March 8 Revolution (Arabic: ثورة الثامن من آذار), was the seizure of power in Syria by the military committee of the Syrian Regional Branch of the Arab Socialist Ba'ath Party. The planning and the unfolding conspiracy of the Syrian Ba'athist operatives were prompted by the Ba'ath party's seizure of power in Iraq in February 1963.

The coup was planned by the military committee, rather than the Ba'ath Party's civilian leadership, but Michel Aflaq, the leader of the party, consented to the conspiracy. The leading members of the military committee throughout the planning process and in the immediate aftermath of taking power were Muhammad Umran, Salah Jadid and Hafez al-Assad, who belonged to the minority Alawite community. The committee enlisted the support of two Nasserists, Rashid al-Qutayni and Muhammad al-Sufi, and the independent Ziad al-Hariri. The coup was originally planned for 7 March, but was postponed one day after the government discovered where the conspirators were planning to assemble. After the coup, the Ba'athist Military committee initiated a series of purges that altered the structure of the Syrian armed forces by replacing 90% of its officer corps with Alawites.

The March 8 coup ended the era of democratic experimentation in the post-colonial Syrian Republic, and transformed Syria towards a one-party state exerting totalitarian domination over daily life. The coup resulted in the ascendancy of the Ba'athist system, which exerted extensive control over social, economic, political, educational and religious spheres through brutal repression and state terror. The Arab Socialist Ba'ath Party maintained its grip on power for over 61 years, through its control of the military, security apparatus, political system and the Mukhabarat, with the country being taken over by its Secretary-General Bashar al-Assad in 2000 until his overthrow during the Syrian Civil War in 2024.

== Background ==
=== Events leading up to the coup ===
Modern Syria was first established in 1920 as the Arab Kingdom of Syria under King Faisal I after the collapse of the Ottoman Empire in 1917. This state was planned to be a new Arab kingdom, and not just Syrian, and the state espoused Arab nationalism and pan-Islamic policies. However the British, who had helped establish the state after World War I, made a secret agreement (Sykes-Picot Agreement) with France and established the Mandate for Syria and the Lebanon. The area thereby functioned as one of France's colonies, and the newly established state was viewed unfavorably by most Syrians, with many of them regarding it as a vassal of European imperialism. At this stage, some movements tried to establish a Syrian identity, most notably the Syrian Social Nationalist Party, or became advocates of communism and Islamism. The majority of Syrians continued to see themselves as Arabs rather than Syrians.

The mandate was feudal in character, and it rested on a semi-liberal oligarchic social base. This system remained unchanged until the establishment of the United Arab Republic (UAR). This system created a class society reflecting urban-rural living patterns. An estimated three thousand families owned half of the land in Syria. The middle class owned the majority of small to medium properties. Some two-thirds of peasants were landless. Agricultural revenues were highly skewed – the top two percent of the population received 50 percent of the income, while the middle class (merchants or middle landowning groups), which was 18 percent of the population, earned 25 percent of agricultural revenues. The bottom 80 percent received the remainder. The landowner–peasant alliance was based on class differences, and social antagonism between each other – this would lead to the landowners' downfall.

The mandate was dissolved in 1946 because of a British ultimatum to France, and Syria became an independent country on 17 April 1946. The same elite that had governed Syria during the mandate continued in power, and they ruled in the same manner. The failure in the 1948 Arab–Israeli War led to the downfall of the traditional elite and the rise of the military in politics. Husni al-Za'im became the first military dictator of Syria in 1949, but in 1950, military officer Adib Shishakli gained power behind the scenes, and by 1953 had established another military dictatorship. The military's introduction to the Syrian political scene destroyed the oligarchy, enabling the middle class to participate in Syrian politics. However, while their powers were weakened, the traditional elite retained the majority of the wealth produced.

It was in this environment that the ideology of Ba'athism came into being. The Arab Ba'ath Movement was established by Michel Aflaq and Salah al-Din al-Bitar in the 1940s; others who played a notable role in the early stages of the Ba'athist movement were Zaki al-Arsuzi, Wahib al-Ghanim and Jallal al-Sayyid. Akram al-Hawrani founded the Arab Socialist Party (ASP) in 1953 – the Ba'ath Party was established through a merger of the ASP and the Arab Ba'ath Party. Of the 150 delegates to the founding congress of the Arab Ba'ath Party in 1947, the majority were either middle-class professionals or intellectuals. By the 1950s the party had managed to acquire an urban middle-class base. However, the Ba'ath Party was not a purely middle-class party, and from the very beginning, it sent party cadres to rural areas to recruit new members and form new party organisations. In 1956, the Ba'ath Party organized the first labour protest in Syrian history. While the Ba'ath Party was strong, its decision to recruit members from across society led to tribalism and clientelism within the party. Party leaders then opted to overlook democratic norms and procedures.

The Ba'ath Party faced a significant dilemma: take power through competitive elections or forceful takeover. Even the liberal and democratic-inclined founding leaders were partial to forceful takeover, citing the corrupt electoral process. Before taking control, the Ba'ath Party gambled that it would be allowed to share power with Gamal Abdel Nasser in the United Arab Republic (UAR). The UAR would prove to be Egypt-dominated, and the Ba'ath Party was forced to dissolve itself, but in 1961 the UAR collapsed because of a military coup in Syria. The establishment and the dissolution of the UAR was a catastrophe for the Ba'ath Party as it divided among those who supported the UAR, those who opposed it and those who opposed or supported the traditional leaders of the party. In 1962, Aflaq convened a Ba'ath Party congress and re-established the party. Several branches had not followed orders and had not dissolved during the UAR years. Instead, they had become deeply hostile to pan-Arabist thought and had become radical socialists instead. The military committee, which would launch the 8 March Revolution, shared most of their views.

=== Economic and social context ===
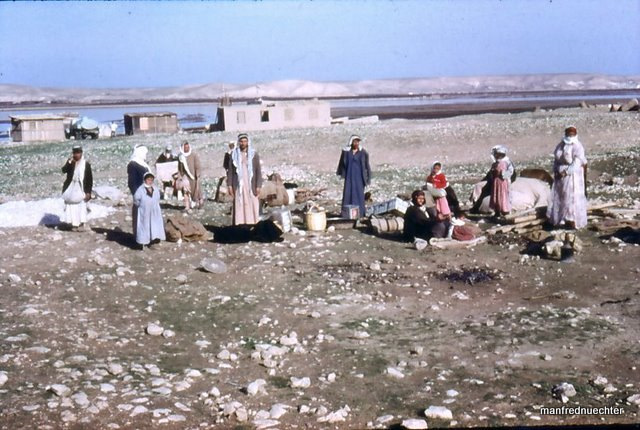
Syrian society was feudal in nature, and was dominated by landlords and peasants

The 8 March Revolution has often been viewed as a mere military coup, but it had many of the ingredients of national revolts from below. The revolution was led by an anti-oligarchical alliance of a radicalised lower middle class, strategic members of the officer corps, marginalised minorities and a significant number of peasants who were mobilised for agrarian conflict. In an international context, the revolution took place because the state boundaries established by France were artificial and the hostility within the newly established Syria to the creation of Israel. The traditional elite that took power in Syria when the country gained independence had come to power during the Mandate for Syria and the Lebanon. The external imposition of arbitrary state boundaries on Syria with no corresponding popular acceptance led to discontent. The national struggle was shaped by ideologies such as Arab nationalism, pan-Islamism and Greater Syrianism. The plebeian character of the struggle and the radical ideologies spawned radical solutions to the agrarian problem.

The growth of the new middle class in Syria fueled discontent since the traditional elite dominated the agrarian sector – the largest sector of the economy – and created most of the wealth. The new middle class consisted of capitalists and entrepreneurs who opposed the traditional elite – the monopolisation of power by the traditional elite led to the radicalisation of the new middle-class. The military, which in many countries is conservative and elitist, became radicalised in Syria because the military wanted greater power, believing that the traditional elite was unable to defend the country. A significant group of military personnel were recruited from the new middle class or the hinterlands.

In Syria, religious minorities were often underprivileged, and a specific ethnicity usually belonged to a specific social class. The Alawites, the Druzes and the Isma'ilis for instance, were religious groups with low social class who began to embrace a radical form of Arab nationalism, e.g. Ba'athism. Without the peasantry there could not have been a Ba'athist revolution in Syria. The new middle class alone could only produce instability, but together with the peasantry, the revolution became possible. The inequality between urban and rural dwellers, together with capitalist penetration of the agrarian sector and the traditional elites' monopolisation of most large revenue sources, led to the establishment of peasant movements who fought for change or opposed the system. The Syrian branch of the Arab Socialist Ba'ath Party was able to recruit youth from radical peasant movements and thus was able to mobilise large sectors of the population.

== Planning ==
In 1962, the military committee of the Syrian Regional Branch of the Arab Socialist Ba'ath Party spent most of its time planning to take power through a conventional military coup. The military committee decided it had to capture al-Kiswah and Qatana, two military camps, seize control of the 70th Armoured Brigade at al-Kiswah, the Military Academy in the city of Homs and the Damascus radio station. While the conspirators of the military committee were all young, the sitting regime had been slowly disintegrating and the traditional elite had lost effective political power.

For the coup to be successful, the military committee needed to gain the support of some of the Syrian officer corps. The collapse of the UAR, coupled with mutinies, purges and transfers left the officer corps in complete disarray and open to anti-government agitation. At the time, the officer corps was split into five different factions; the Damascus faction which supported the Syrian Government, supporters of Akram al-Hawrani, a Nasserist faction, a Ba'athist faction and a group of independents. The Damascus faction was the enemy of the military committee because of their support for Nazim al-Qudsi's Government and the Hawranist were considered as rivals because of their stance against pan-Arabism. The Nasserists became allies of the Ba'ath, even while they supported Gamal Abdel Nasser and the reestablishment of the UAR.

The military committee's alliance with the Nasserists led to the establishment of secret contact with Colonel Rashid al-Qutayni, the head of the military intelligence, and Colonel Muhammad al-Sufi, the commander of the Homs Brigade. The military committee ordered a group of junior officers to recruit the leading independent Colonel Ziad al-Hariri, the commander of the front facing Israel, to their cause. The group was successful, and they promised al-Hariri that "If we succeed, you can become chief of staff. If we fail, you can disown us." Al-Hariri supported the committee because Khalid al-Azm, the Prime Minister of Syria, was planning to demote him.

While it planned the coup, the military committee and its members were frowned upon by civilian Ba'athists. The reason for the army–party alliance in the first place was to safeguard the party from repression. The military committee did not look favourably on the civilian leadership led by Michel Aflaq, objecting to his dissolution of the Ba'ath Party during the UAR years. While Aflaq needed the military committee to seize power, the committee needed Aflaq to hold on power – without Aflaq they would have no support base. At the 5th National Ba'ath Party Congress, held on 8 May 1962, it was decided to reestablish the party and keep Aflaq as Secretary General of the National Command. Muhammad Umran, a leading member of the military committee, was a delegate at the 5th National Congress, and told Aflaq of the military committee's intentions – Aflaq consented to the coup, but no agreement was made between him and the committee on how to share power after the coup. The Ba'ath Party had no alternative to coming to power except through a military coup, which automatically placed the armed forces in a central position, laying the foundation for future militarism in Syria.

== The coup ==
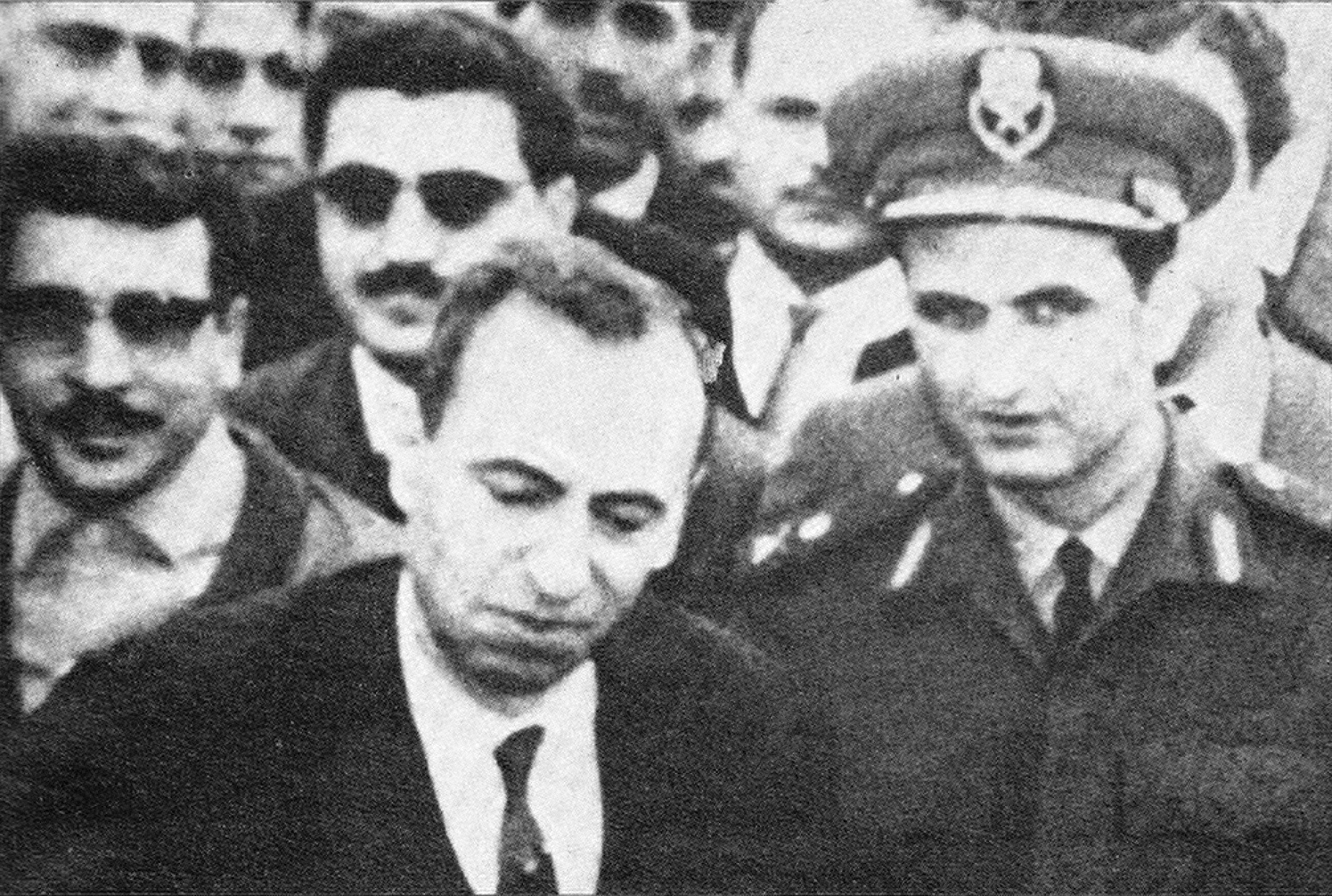
Aflaq, the leader of the party's civilian-wing, and Jadid, a senior figure in the planning of the coup d'état

On 8 February 1963, the Iraqi Regional Branch, led by Ali Salih al-Sa'di, took power in Iraq by overthrowing Abd al-Karim Qasim. He was a far more formidable opponent than al-Qudsi, and the Iraqi Regional Branch managed to take power through an alliance not only with military officers, but also with segments of the middle class. Qasim's downfall changed the rules of Arab politics – the Nasserists had monopolised the Arab nationalist movement since the UAR, but the takeover made the Ba'ath Party a force to be reckoned with. In contrast to the Iraqi regional branch, the Syrian regional branch did not have mass support or a significant support base in the middle class. While Aflaq cautioned the plotters because of the party's lack of support, they failed to share his worries, and planned to launch the coup on 7 March. However, that day the military intelligence raided the apartment where the plotters were planning to assemble. Hafez al-Assad was given the task of reporting to other units that the coup had been postponed to 8 March.

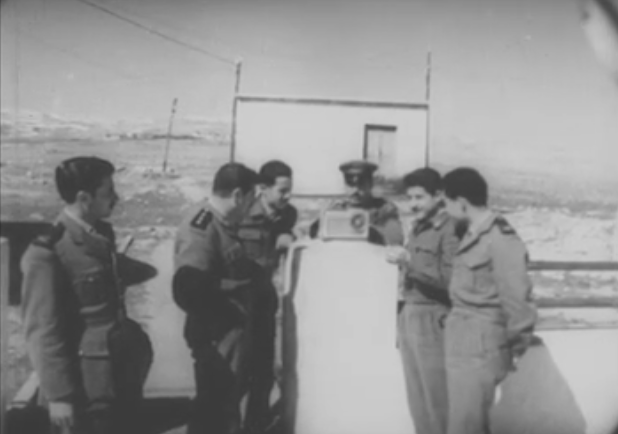
Syrian soldiers and officers at the radio during the coup. When the Baathists came to power, they immediately declared martial law, which was in effect continuously until 2011 and became the longest in history.

On the night of 7–8 March, tanks and units loyal to the conspiracy began moving on Damascus. Al-Hariri led a brigade from the Syrian front towards Israel, while Ba'athists were able to gain control of a second brigade stationed in Suwayda. Caught in a pincer movement, the commander of the 70th Armoured Brigade, Lieutenant General Abd al-Karim surrendered to the plotters – Umran took over as acting commander of the 70th Armoured Brigade. The potentially hostile unit stationed in Qatana, south-west of Damascus, did not intervene – probably because Widad Bashir had taken control over communications in the Damascus area. With the forces in al-Kiswah defeated and Qatana neutralised, al-Hariri's forces marched upon Damascus and began to set up road-blocks in the city, while at the same time seizing critical facilities such as the central post office. Captain Salim Hatum, a party officer, seized the radio station. The Ministry of Defence headquarters were seized without a fight, and General Zahr al-Din, the commander-in-chief, was put under arrest. Both al-Qudsi and al-Hawrani were easily tracked down and arrested. Salah Jadid bicycled into the city that morning, and captured the Bureau of Officers' Affairs, which later became his personal fiefdom.

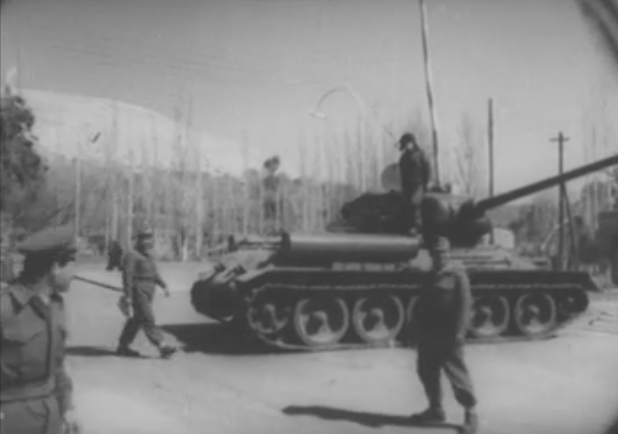
Syrian tank and soldiers in Damascus after successful coup in 1963.

Assad led a small group of conspirators to capture the al-Dumayr air base, 40 kilometers (25 mi) north-east of Damascus – the only unit that resisted the coup. Some of its planes had been ordered to bomb rebel positions. The plan was that Assad would lead a company from al-Hariri's brigade to capture the air base before dawn to prevent air strikes. The surrender of the 70th Armoured Brigade took longer than expected, putting Assad's forces behind schedule. When Assad's forces reached the outskirts of the base, it was broad daylight. Assad sent an emissary to tell the commanders that he would start shelling the base if they did not surrender. They negotiated their surrender even though, according to Assad himself, their forces could have defeated his rebel company in combat. Later that morning, the coupmakers convened at the army headquarters to celebrate.

The coup was carried out without violence, as the politicians were too demoralized to resist. The coup was met by indifference in the population at large. Saber Falhout, a Druze who was later known as "the poet of the revolution", wrote and announced the first communique of the plotters. The ninth communique reinstated the five members of the military committee in the armed forces. The senior members of the newly established regime were Umran, Jadid and at last, Assad.

A state of emergency was declared, which would not be lifted until during a nationwide uprising in 2011.

=== Egyptian and U.S. involvement ===
Historian Brandon Wolfe-Hunnicutt writes that Egyptian President "Gamal Abdel Nasser appeared to have supported" the coup, although he argues that "In truth, the Syrian Ba'th probably got more help from the CIA than from Egypt." In an interview with political scientist Malik Mufti, senior Syrian Ba'athist Jamal al-Atassi stated that "in the case of the Ba'athist takeover in Syria—there was a push from the West and in particular from the United States for the Ba'ath to seize power and monopolize it and push away all the other elements and forces."

== Immediate aftermath ==
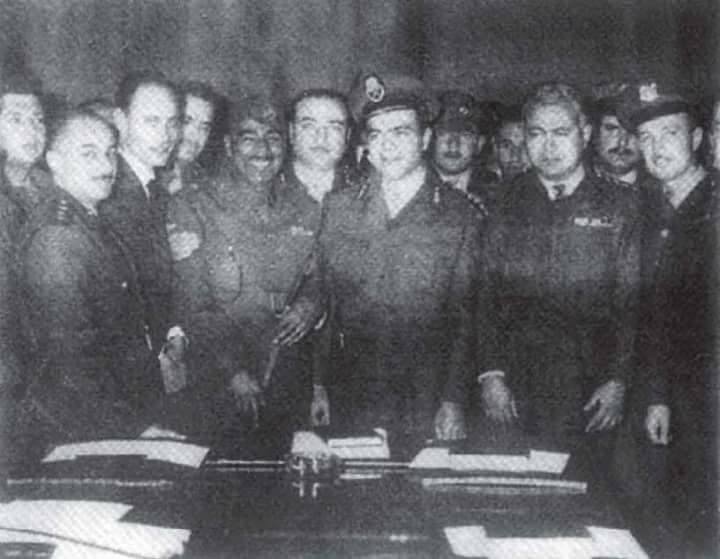
Syrian officers after successful coup.

The Syrian Regional Branch ruled the country uninterrupted from the coup until December 2024

The first act of the new rulers of Syria was to establish the twenty-man National Council for the Revolutionary Command (NCRC), composed of twelve Ba'athists and eight Nasserists and independents. It was a military junta created to rule Baathist Syria. On 9 March, the NCRC ordered Salah al-Din al-Bitar, one of the Ba'ath Party founders, to form a government, and to implement the policies of the NCRC. Later, six civilians were given membership in NCRC, three Ba'athists (Aflaq, al-Bitar and Mansur al-Atrash) and three Nasserists. However, this did not change the balance of power, and the officers still controlled the country. From the beginning, the military committee members formed state policies behind the backs of other NCRC members – when the civilian leadership found out, al-Atrash said: "Why do not these gentlemen speak? May I suggest they appoint a liaison officer to communicate their views to us?" From that day, Umran gave the civilians a faint idea of what the committee members were planning. Another policy was to staff positions in the armed forces with Alawite relatives and friends close to the members of Military Committee.

At the beginning, there were no signs of the quarrels that would destroy the military committee. At the time, the members were bound together by their goal of building a prosperous nation. On 9 March the NCRC released Lu'ay al-Atassi from jail, promoted him to the rank of lieutenant general, appointed him commander-in-chief and NCRC chairman, the de facto head of state. Hariri was appointed chief of staff. While Atassi and Hariri held powerful posts, they did not possess enough personal or political power to threaten the NCRC. The Nasserist officers were also given notable offices with Muhammad al-Sufi becoming Minister of Defence and Rashid al-Qutayni becoming deputy chief of staff. However, the Military Committee, which had expanded its membership with five new members, (Note: These new members were Salim Hatum, Ahmad Suwaydani, Muhammad Rabah al-Tawil, Hamad 'Ubayd and Musa al-Zu'bi. There was a further expansion of the Military Committee in the summer of 1963, but according to Assad the highest Military Committee membership number reached was 13.) ensured that the Ba'athists controlled the real levers of powers. The committee decided state policies before the sessions of the NCRC, and by doing so became the real seat of power.

Umran was first given the command of the 5th Brigade in Homs, but was promoted in June to become commander of the 70th Armoured Brigade. As head of the Bureau of Officers' Affairs, Jadid appointed friends to senior positions, purged his enemies and appointed several Ba'athists to senior positions. Ahmad Suwaydani, one of the new members of the Military Committee, was appointed Head of Military Intelligence and Mazyad Hunaydi became Head of the Military Police. The Military Academy at Homs was put under Ba'athist control—several hundred Ba'athists, including Assad's brother Rifaat al-Assad, were given a crash course in military teaching before being given command. Assad became the de facto head of the Syrian Air Force, a dizzying promotion for a man in his thirties. Considering that the members of the Military Committee were all too young to be perceived as the real leaders of Syria by the populace, the Military Committee appointed Colonel Amin al-Hafiz to the post of Minister of the Interior.

=== Purges and failed coup of 18 July ===
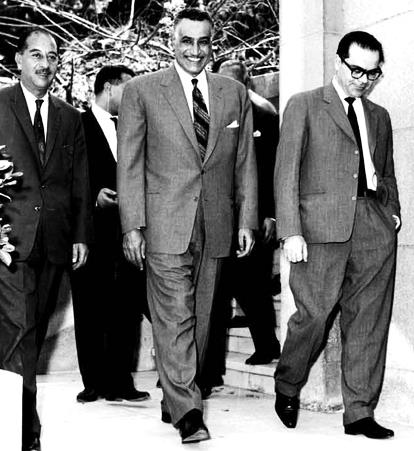
Tripartite unity talks among Iraqi Prime Minister Ahmed Hassan al-Bakr (left), Egyptian President Gamal Abdel Nasser (center) and Syrian President Lu'ay al-Atassi (right), 16 April 1963. Relations between Nasser and the Syrian Ba'athists deteriorated weeks later after the purge of Nasserists from the officer corps and Alwan's failed coup. Atassi resigned following the events.

Pressure from consistent pro-Nasser demonstrations in northern Syria and Damascus and from pro-union Ba'athist leaders like Jamal al-Atassi, the Nasserists and the Arab Nationalist Movement (ANM), coupled with the weakness of the Ba'athists at the popular level in Syria, led to unification efforts between the new government and the governments of Egypt and Iraq. The latter's anti-UAR government had also been overthrown by pro-UAR officers in 1963. On 17 April a new stage-based unity agreement was reached that would include the three states in a federal union with Nasser as president and Commander-in-Chief of the Armed Forces.

However, between 28 April-2 May, the Ba'athist-dominated Military Committee virtually renounced the agreement when it purged over 50 Nasserist officers from their high-ranking positions in the armed forces, leading to a wide-scale propaganda campaign by Egypt via radio denouncing the Ba'ath (Nasserist-leaning newspapers had been previously shut down.) Mass pro-union rioting in Aleppo, Damascus, Hama and other parts of the country followed. The purges prompted the protest resignations of Nasserist officials, including Defense Minister al-Sufi, Deputy Chief of Staff al-Qutayni, and four other Nasserist cabinet members. (Note: The Nasserist cabinet members who resigned were Deputy Prime Minister and Justice Minister Nihad al-Qasim, Finance Minister Abd al-Wahhab Hawmad, Defense Minister Muhammad al-Sufi, Planning Minister Hani al-Hindi, Supply Minister Sami Sufan, Communications Minister Jihad Dahi.) The purges resulted in the culmination of neo-Ba'athist transformation of the Syrian military, which became mostly stripped of Sunni officers and packed with loyalist Alawite officers. This became a source of outcry across Syria and numerous intellectuals began highlighting the new regime's sectarian character through media outlets and publications.

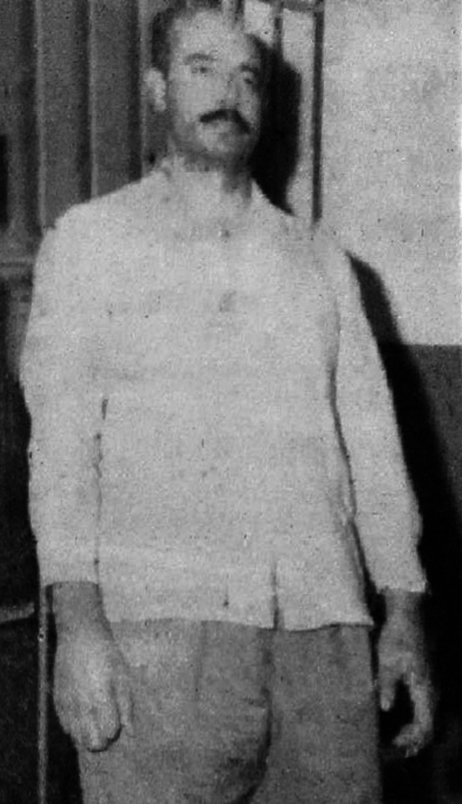
Jassem Alwan being tried in a Damascus military court for his failed coup attempt against the Syrian Ba'ath, 1963

Later, on 19 June, Chief of Staff al-Hariri led a high-ranking delegation that included Prime Minister al-Bitar, Aflaq and Education Minister Sami Droubi to Algeria for a state visit. While al-Hariri was away, the Committee used the opportunity to undertake a purge of about 30 elite officers—mostly political independents—under al-Hariri's command. Al-Hariri was ordered to take a direct flight to the Syrian embassy in the United States, where he was reassigned as the embassy's military attache. Instead, he returned to Syria via a flight to Beirut on 23 June to protest the committee's move against him. Unsuccessful, he left the country for France in a self-imposed exile on 8 July. The committee's virtual ousting of al-Hariri was to the chagrin of al-Bitar, who viewed al-Hariri as the last military counterweight able to check the committee's domination over his government.

The Nasserists still maintained a relatively high level of strength in the military, despite the purges, and on 18 July, under the leadership of Jassem Alwan and the help of Egyptian intelligence, they attempted to launch a daytime coup against the new government. The Army Headquarters, personally defended by al-Hafiz, and the broadcast station were attacked, and the ensuing battle left hundreds of people dead, including several civilian bystanders. The coup attempt failed and 27 participating officers were arrested and executed. The executions were a rare punitive action used to deal with the participants of a failed coup in Syria, with the typical punishment being exile, imprisonment or reassignment to a foreign diplomatic post. President Lu'ay al-Atassi subsequently resigned, signalling his disapproval of the executions. After evading the authorities for a short period, Alwan and his chief co-conspirators Raef al-Maarri and Muhammad Nabhan were apprehended and brought to military trial, where they were found guilty of treason and sentenced to death. They were released exactly a year later and exiled, after lobbying by Nasser and Iraqi President Abdul Salam Arif.

In 1963 the Ba'ath Party finally came to power in Damascus in a military coup. But more significant than its ideology was the ethnic makeup of the corps of officers now in control: because of the assiduous French recruitment of minorities—especially Alawites—into the Troupes Speciales du Levant, the Alawites had, without anyone's noticing, gradually taken over the military from within. Though Alawites constituted just 12 percent of the Syrian population, they now dominated the corps of young officers.

— Robert D. Kaplan, American author

The failure of Alwan's revolt marked the end of significant Nasserist influence in Syria's military and civilian institutions, and with the pro-Nasser forces largely defeated, the Ba'athist Military Committee became the sole power center of the country. Relations with Egypt immediately soured, with Nasser, still popular with the Syrian masses, issuing broadcasts denouncing the Ba'athists as "murderers" and "fascists", and representing the forces of heresy and atheism, a derogatory reference to the party's embrace of strict secularism and the numerous leadership positions held by non-Sunni Muslims, particularly Alawites. Nasser also announced his withdrawal from the 17 April unity agreement. One of the crucial outcomes of the coup and subsequent purges was the dominance of Alawite commanders in the neo-Ba'athist officer corps, who assumed control of the Syrian military. The younger neo-Ba'athist officers would subsequently rebel against the Old Guard of the Ba'ath party, resulting in the 1966 coup.

== See also ==
- List of modern conflicts in the Middle East
  - Syrian Crisis of 1957
  - 1961 Syrian coup d'état
  - 1966 Syrian coup d'état
  - Corrective Revolution (Syria)
  - Syrian Civil War

== Notes and references ==
=== Bibliography ===
- Commins, David D. (2004). Historical Dictionary of Syria. Scarecrow Press. ISBN 978-0-8108-4934-1. Archived from the original on 2 April 2023.
- Hinnebusch, Raymond (2001). Syria: Revolution from Above (1st ed.). Routledge. ISBN 978-0-415-26779-3.
- Hopwood, Derek (1988). Syria 1945–1986: Politics and Society. Routledge. ISBN 978-0-04-445046-7.
- Moubayed, Sami M. (2006). Steel & Silk: Men and Women who shaped Syria 1900–2000. Cune Press. ISBN 978-1-885942-41-8.
- Mufti, Malik (1996). Sovereign Creations: Pan-Arabism and Political Order in Syria and Iraq. Cornell University Press. ISBN 0-8014-3168-9. "Alwan Syria 1962."
- Rabinovich, Itamar (1972). Syria Under the Baʻth, 1963–66: The Army Party Symbiosis. Transaction Publishers. ISBN 9780706512663. Archived from the original on 2 April 2023.
- Seale, Patrick (1990). Asad of Syria: The Struggle for the Middle East. University of California Press. ISBN 978-0-520-06976-3.
- Political Studies and Public Administration Department of the American University of Beirut (1963). Chronology of Arab Politics. Vol. 1. American University of Beirut. Political Studies and Public Administration Department.
- van Dam, Nikolaos (2017). "Chapter 1: A Synopsis of Ba'thist History Before the Syrian Revolution (2011)". Destroying a Nation: The Civil War in Syria. New York, USA: I. B. Tauris. ISBN 978-1-78453-797-5.
