= Muhammad al-Sufi =

Syrian politician (1927–2018)

- محمد الصوفي
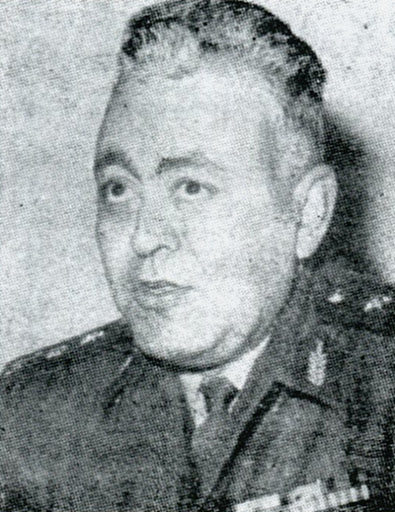

5th Minister of Defense
- In office 8 March 1963 – 2 May 1963
- Prime Minister: Salah al-Din Bitar
- Preceded by: Abdul Karim Zahreddine
- Succeeded by: Ziad al-Hariri

Personal details
- Born: 1927 Latakia, French Syria
- Died: 19 November 2018 (aged 90–91) Latakia, Syria

Military service
- Allegiance: First Syrian Republic (1948–1950); Second Syrian Republic (1950–1958); United Arab Republic (1958–1961); Second Syrian Republic (1961–1963); Ba'athist Syria (1963)
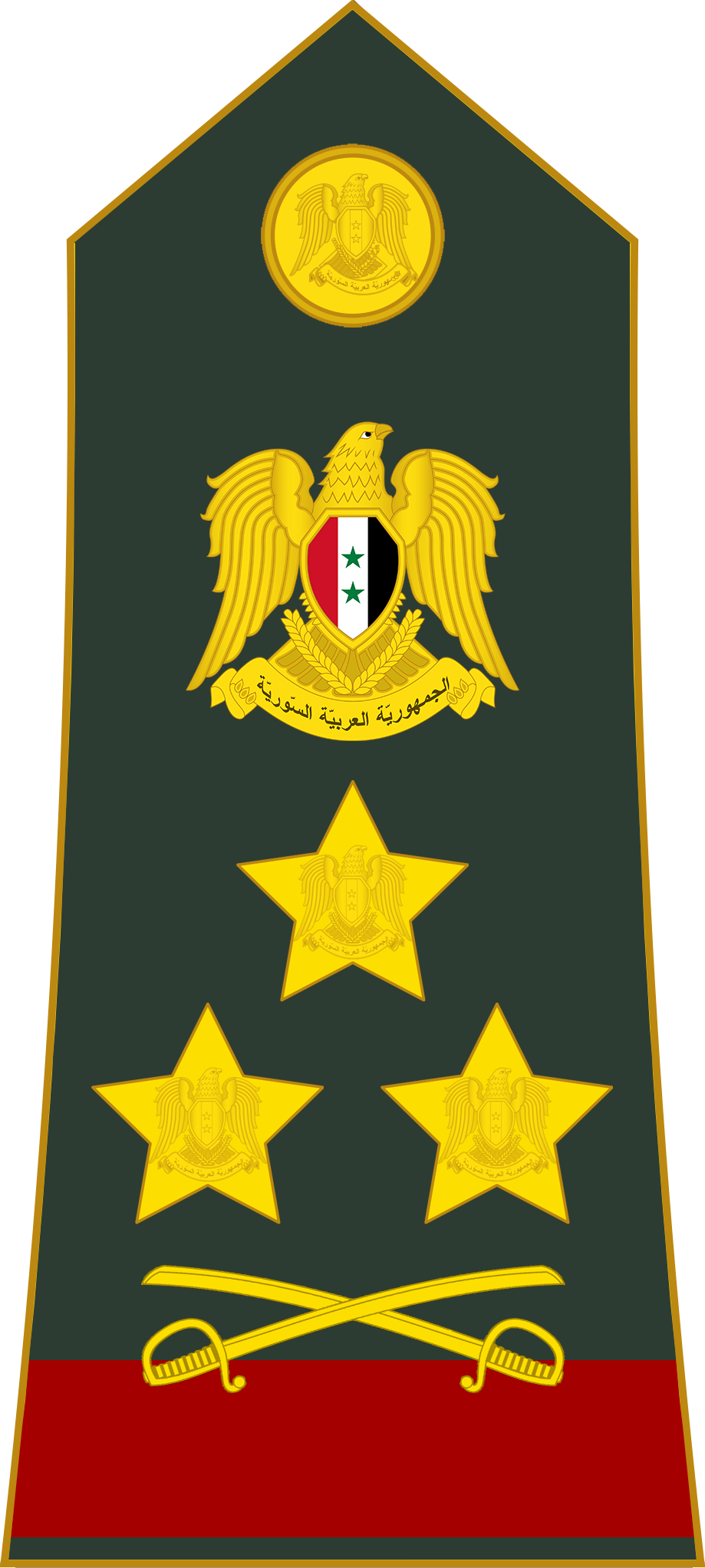
- Rank: Field Marshal

Muhammad al-Sufi (Arabic: محمد الصوفي; 1927 – 19 November 2018) was a Syrian field marshal who played a role in the 1963 Syrian coup d'état and briefly served as Defense Minister between March and May of that year. Politically a Nasserist, he was sidelined by Ba'athist rivals in the military and departed the political scene before returning to Syria in the 1990s.

== Career and role in 1963 events ==
In 1948 Sufi graduated from the Homs Military Academy, and in the early 1960s he served as the army's brigade in Homs, central Syria. A staunch supporter of Egypt's president and leading pan-Arabist, Gamal Abdel Nasser, he opposed Syria's secession from the United Arab Republic (a union with Egypt) in 1961. He was not alone and by mid-1962 a loose unionist coalition was formed among officer corps bringing together Nasserists, led by Sufi and Rashid al-Qutaini, Ba'athists led by the Military Committee and political independents led by Ziad al-Hariri. The unionists planned a coup to toppled the secessionist government of Nazim al-Kudsi and Khalid al-Azm.

While it was eventually decided that the planned coup be implemented on 9 March, Sufi and Qutaini proposed to Hariri on 5 March that the plan be postponed until 11 March. Their stated intention to further ensure unionist control over more army units so as to avoid any violence during the coup. Their non-Nasserist counterparts viewed this as an attempt by Sufi and the Nasserists to launch their own coup at a later time and according to Syria expert Itamar Rabinovich, the Nasserists, who were the largest single faction among the unionist officers and maintained a significant level of popular support due to their association with President Nasser, likely feared being sidelined by the Ba'athists and the independents should the coup have gone as planned. Nonetheless, the coup was not delayed and was launched earlier on the night of 7 March, succeeding by the morning 8 March. Sufi and Qutaini were taken off guard and rushed to join the insurrection, playing relatively minor roles.

Al-Sufi's image in the newspaper that announced his interrogation

The new government took place under the leadership of the National Council for the Revolutionary Command (NCRC), which was dominated by the Ba'athists. The NCRC had chosen Lu'ay al-Atassi as president and co-founder of the Ba'ath Party, Salah al-Din Bitar, as Prime Minister. Bitar appointed Sufi as Defense Minister, although most of the cabinet's portfolio's were primarily assigned to Ba'athists and other loyalists. Tensions began to develop between the Nasserists and the Ba'athists towards the end of month and increased tremendously when the former viewed the latter as reneging on a unity agreement signed with Egypt and Iraq on 17 April. The situation culminated with a mass purging of Nasserist officers beginning on 28 April, prompting Sufi to resign from the defense ministry and the NCRC in protest. He had been in Beirut, Lebanon when he declared his resignation. Following a failed coup attempt by Nasserists led by colonels Jassem Alwan and Raef al-Maarri, Sufi was arrested and tried in a military court which sentenced him to life imprisonment for alleged participation in anti-government activity. He was released in December 1964, as part of wider amnesty decree that also saw Alwan, Maarri and other alleged conspirators released and exiled. Sufi left Syria sometime after.

== Return to Syria ==
Sufi was invited back to Syria in the spring of 1990 by then-President Hafez al-Assad, who had been a member of the Ba'athist Military Committee at the time of Sufi's resignation. The period marked an opening for Syrian political exiles. After his return, Sufi founded the Nasserite Democratic Arab Party.

Sufi died in Latakia on 19 November 2018.

== Bibliography ==
- Choueiri, Youssef M. (2010). Islamic Fundamentalism 3rd Edition: The Story of Islamist Movements. Continuum. ISBN 978-0826498014.
- Drysdale, Alasdair (1991). Syria and the Middle East Peace Process. Council on Foreign Relations. ISBN 9780876091050.
- Moubayed, Sami M. (2006). Steel & Silk: Men and Women who shaped Syria 1900–2000. Cune Press. ISBN 978-1885942418.
- Mufti, Malik (1996). Sovereign Creations: Pan-Arabism and Political Order in Syria and Iraq. Cornell University Press. ISBN 0801431689. "Alwan Syria 1962."
- Rabinovich, Itamar (1972). Syria Under the Baʻth, 1963-66: The Army Party Symbiosis. Transaction Publishers. ISBN 0706512669.
- Seale, Patrick (1990). Asad of Syria: The Struggle for the Middle East. University of California Press. ISBN 978-0520069763.
