= Salah al-Din al-Bitar =

Syrian politician (1912–1980)

- صلاح الدين البيطار
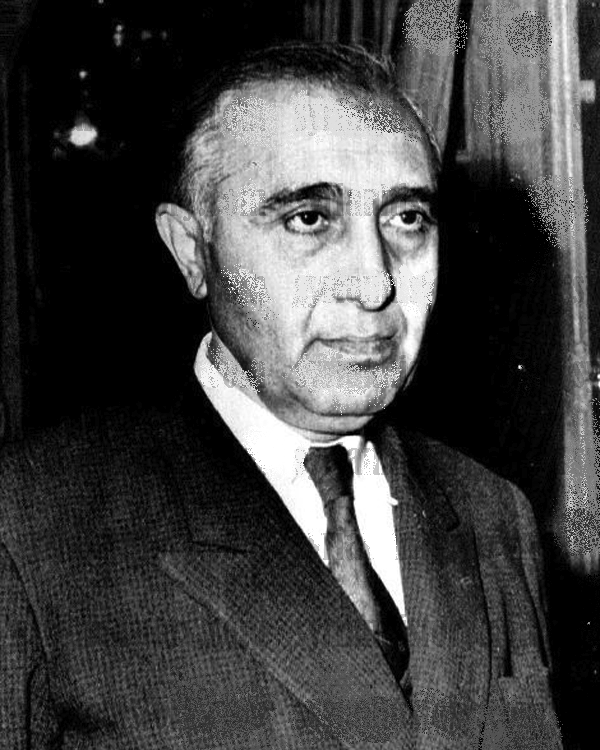

Prime Minister of Syria
- In office 1 January 1966 – 23 February 1966
- President: Amin al-Hafiz
- Preceded by: Yusuf Zuayyin
- Succeeded by: Yusuf Zuayyin
- In office 13 May 1964 – 3 October 1964
- President: Amin al-Hafiz
- Preceded by: Amin al-Hafiz
- Succeeded by: Amin al-Hafiz
- In office 9 March 1963 – 11 November 1963
- President: Lu'ay al-Atassi; Amin al-Hafiz
- Preceded by: Khalid al-Azm
- Succeeded by: Amin al-Hafiz

Member of the National Command of the Arab Socialist Ba'ath Party
- In office 6 April 1947 – 1 September 1959

Minister of Foreign Affairs
- In office June 1956 – 22 February 1958
- President: Shukri al-Quwatli
- Preceded by: Said al-Ghazzi
- Succeeded by: Mahmoud Fawzi (UAR)

Personal details
- Born: 1912 Damascus, Ottoman Syria, Ottoman Empire
- Died: 21 July 1980 (aged 67–68) Paris, France
- Party: Ba'ath Party
- Education: University of Paris

Salah al-Din al-Bitar (Arabic: صلاح الدين البيطار, romanized: Ṣalāḥ ad-Dīn al-Bīṭār; 1912 – 21 July 1980) was a Syrian politician who co-founded the Baʿath Party with Michel Aflaq in the early 1940s. As students in Paris in the early 1930s, the two formulated a doctrine that combined aspects of nationalism and socialism. Bitar later served as prime minister in several early Ba'athist governments in Syria but became alienated from the party as it grew more radical. In 1966 he fled the country, lived mostly in Europe and remained politically active until he was assassinated in Paris in 1980 by unidentified hitmen linked to the regime of Hafez al-Assad.

== Early years ==
According to historian Hanna Batatu, Bitar was born in the Midan area of Damascus in 1912; he was the son of a reasonably well-off Sunni Muslim grain merchant. His family were religious, and many of his recent ancestors had been ulama and preachers in the district's mosques. Bitar grew up in a conservative family atmosphere and attended a Muslim elementary school before receiving his secondary education in Maktab Anbar. He was exposed to the political vicissitudes of the time, as Midan played a leading role in the Great Syrian Revolt of 1925 against France—then the mandatory and colonial power in Syria. The district was heavily bombarded during the revolt, resulting in considerable loss of life and physical damage to its infrastructure.

Bitar traveled to France in 1929 to study in the Sorbonne. There, he became acquainted with Michel Aflaq, also the son of a Midan grain merchant who was from a Christian Orthodox family. They were both interested in the political and intellectual movements of the time and began applying nationalist and Marxist ideas to the situation of their homeland. In 1935, Bitar returned to Syria and took a job as a science teacher in Syria's most prestigious secondary school, and started a magazine with Aflaq, called al-Tali‘a [The Vanguard].

== Ba'ath politics ==
=== Early political activity ===
During the next two years, Bitar, Aflaq and other associates edited a magazine entitled al-Tali`a (the vanguard). According to Batatu, this publication displayed more concern with social issues than with national problems. Bitar and Aflaq were unhappy with the National Bloc, the main party representing Syria in the Parliament, which Bitar called the "Syrian bourgeoisie". At the same time, huge student demonstrations took place all over Syria, which were breaking with the Syrian bourgeoisie, which Bitar and Aflak were part of, according to him. Their political stance was closer to the Syrian Communist Party than to any of the other political groups in Damascus. They became disillusioned with the French Communists in 1936, after the Popular Front government came to power in France. Although the French Communist Party was now part of the government, France's approach to its colonies barely changed.

The student movement gradually broke with the National Bloc when they signed the Franco-Syrian Treaty of Independence, which recognized Syria's independence but granted full emancipation gradually over a 25–year period and was seen as French hegemony camouflaged. The French then refused to ratify the treaty.

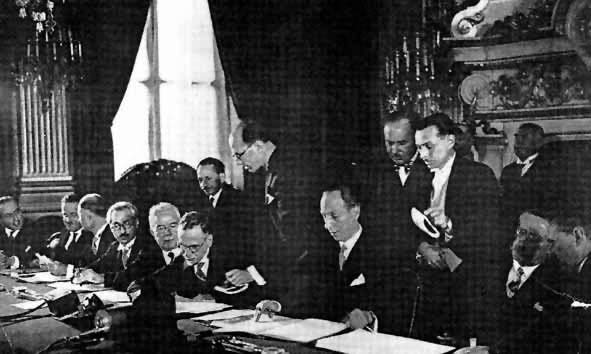
The National Bloc signing of the Franco-Syrian Treaty of Independence, 1936

In 1939, Aflaq and Bitar began to attract a small following of students, and in 1941 they issued leaflets agitating against French rule, using the title Arab Ihya Movement —"the Arab Revival". On 24 October 1942, both Bitar and Aflaq resigned from their teaching positions to take up politics full-time.

Their first use of the name al-ba'ath al-'arabi—which means resurrection or rebirth—came in may 1941 following Rashid Ali al-Gaylani's coup against the British in Iraq. The term had already been adopted by Zaki al-Arsuzi—a nationalist activist from Iskandarun province in north-western Syria who had come to Damascus in the wake of his native area's annexation by Turkey. Al-Arsuzi founded his own Arab Ba'ath party in 1940 and he disagreed with Bitar and Aflak on the Iraqi coup, arguing it was doomed to fail, while the two men were enthusiastic and wanted to send volunteers to Iraq. Al-Arsuzi's movement faded away following his exile by the French.

Bitar and Aflak slowly gained supporters and in 1945 the first elected Bureau of the Arab Ba'ath Movement was formed, including both men. The organisation gained many new members when most of the former supporters of Al-Arsuzi, led by Wahib al-Ghanim, joined it.

According to Bitar, most of the students joined them and not the communist party as "any political movement in Syria cannot materialize except through Arab nationalism", indicating that national independence was the priority at the time, rather than social issues. According to Patrick Seale, "Aflak and Arsuzi's achievement was to help lift this burden of guilt and inferiority. Aflak formulated a theory and a programme to rouse the Arab from what he considered a living death. This is what he meant by ba'ath".

=== On the leadership of the Ba'ath Party ===
In 1947, during the first party congress held in Damascus; Bitar was elected secretary general. Aflaq took the pre-eminent position of 'amid, sometimes translated as "doyen"; this made him the effective leader of the party with sweeping powers within the organization under the constitution adopted at the congress. In 1952 Syria's military leader Adib al-Shishakli banned all political parties. Bitar and Aflaq took refuge in neighboring Lebanon, where they came into contact with Akram al-Hawrani—an experienced politician who had recently established the Arab Socialist Party and had a considerable following among the peasantry of the Hama region in central Syria and a valuable foothold in the military officer corps. The three politicians agreed to merge their parties and co-operated in the overthrow of Shishakli in 1954, following which a congress ratified the merger of the two parties into the Arab Socialist Ba'ath Party. The rules and constitution of Bitar and Aflaq's party were adopted unchanged. All three were elected to the party's new National Command, along with a supporter of Hawrani.

=== Power politics: 1954–1958 ===
Following the overthrow of Shishakli, Syria held its first democratic elections in five years. Bitar was elected as a deputy for Damascus, defeating the secretary general of the Syrian Social National Party—one of the Ba'ath's bitterest ideological enemies. He became Minister for Foreign Affairs in 1956 and held the post until 1958. Along with other Ba'athists, he agitated in favour of the unification of Syria with Nasser's Egypt.

=== United Arab Republic and interregnum: 1958–1963 ===
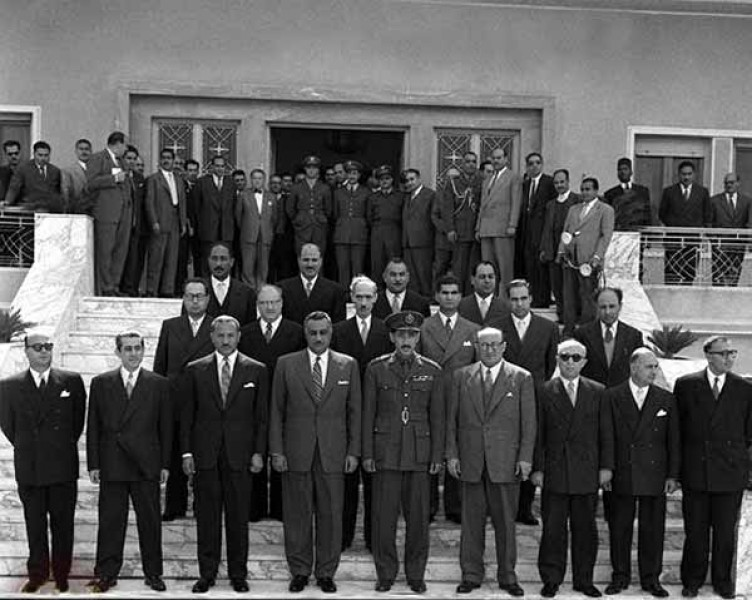
Nasser at the gates of the Presidential Palace in Damascus in 1958. Nasser was standing with Syrian and Egyptian cabinet members of the UAR. From left to right; Vice President Hawrani, Abd al-Latif al-Baghdadi, a vice president, followed by Nasser, Marshal Abd al-Hakim Amer, who became Governor of Syria, and Sabri al-Asali, a vice president. Then stands Fakhir al-Kayyali, the Minister of Economy. Standing to the far right is Bitar. In the middle row, second from left, is Abd al-Hamid Sarraj, the Minister of Interior

Bitar expected to be appointed the Vice President of the United Arab Republic (UAR) but instead he was appointed the Minister of State for Arab Affairs, and later the Minister of Culture and National Guidance. At the beginning, Bitar was the only Syrian in the central cabinet. He and other Syrians in the UAR leadership became dismayed over the dominant role Nasser gave the Egyptians in administrating the UAR. Nasser had opposed the formation of a joint leadership council of Egyptians and Syrians.

On 23–24 December 1959 Bitar—together with Hawrani (the UAR Vice President and central Minister of Justice), Mustafa Hamdun (Syrian regional Minister of Agriculture and Agrarian Reform) and Abd al-Ghani Qannut (the Syrian regional social affairs and labour minister), as well as all former members of the Syrian Regional Branch of the Ba'ath Party who worked within the UAR bureaucracy—resigned their posts. The resignation were made public, and were accepted later in December. A fifth Syrian regional minister, Khalil al-Khallas, the Minister of Economy and a member of the Executive Council of Syria (the Syrian regional government), resigned in January 1960. Syrians began to resign en masse, and by August 1960 only three Syrians remained in the official decision-making bodies of the UAR. The lack of Syrian participation was "corrected" in September when five new Syrian cabinet members were appointed, but the ratio of two Egyptians for each Syrian central cabinet member was kept until 1961. From December 1959, Bitar and the Ba'ath Party began to oppose the UAR and its political structure. Bitar supported the coup of 28 September 1961, which dissolved the UAR as a de facto union between Egypt and Syria.

On 2 October 1961, Bitar, Hawrani and 14 other politicians—mostly conservatives—signed a manifesto. Two months later, Bitar signed a similar document, the National Charter for the Separatist Regime. His signing both of these documents was used against him in the 1963 Unity Talks between Egypt, Iraq and Syria as proof of him lacking pro-Arab nationalist credentials. The manifesto, which was handwritten by Bitar, stated that Nasser had distorted "the idea of Arab nationalism" and accused him of strangling the "political and democratic life" in Syria. Bitar, then under popular criticism, withdrew his signature from the 2 October manifesto, but it was too late to prevent damage. Several members called upon Aflaq to expel Bitar from the party, citing his wild opportunism. After the dissolution of the UAR, Bitar did not join the reconstituted Syrian Regional Branch of the Ba'ath Party until after the 8 March 1963 Syrian coup d'état. Because of this, Aflaq became the unquestionable leader of the Ba'ath Party.

== Terms as Prime Minister ==
=== First term ===
==== First cabinet: 9 March – 11 May 1963 ====
Bitar's first cabinet was appointed by the National Council for the Revolutionary Command (NCRC) on 9 March 1963 in the aftermath of the 1963 Syrian coup d'état. Nine of the twenty cabinet members were Ba'athists. All vital ministries except the defense ministry—which was headed by independent Nasserite General Muhammad al-Sufi—were given to Ba'athists. The Ba'athist–Nasserite coalition government was unstable and based upon power politics rather than any sort of allegiance. Bitar and Aflaq sought to gain popular legitimacy among the Syrian people and viewed the coalition government as a means towards gaining the blessings of Nasser, who was still popular in Syria. Many members wanted to turn the Ba'ath into a Syria-focused party and did not care about Nasser's position towards Syria. This faction later became known as the "Regionalists" ("Qutriyyin").

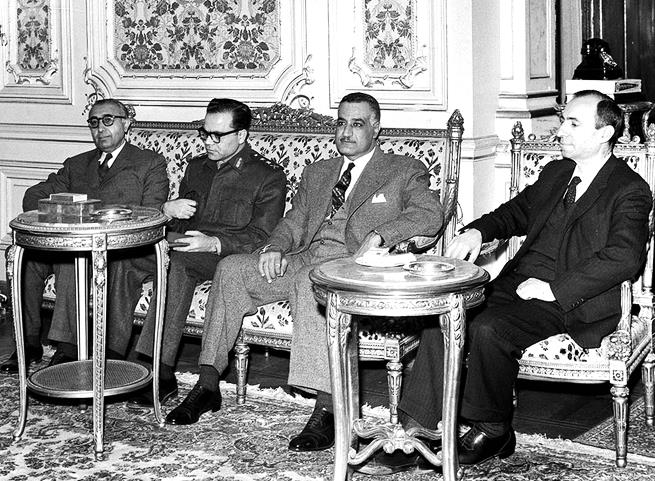
A meeting between the Syrian and Egyptian delegations. From left to right: Prime Minister Bitar, head of state Atassi, Egyptian President Nasser, and Aflaq, the Ba'ath Party leader

Bitar was also appointed foreign affairs minister. He represented Syria at the Egyptian–Syrian–Iraqi unity negotiations of March–April 1963. In the first round of negotiations, which lasted until 19 March when Bitar and Aflaq joined in, the Ba'ath Party was represented by Abd al-Karim Zuhur—the economy minister. Nasser treated them badly during the negotiations, and Bitar and Aflaq moved closer to the position of the Regionalists. Nasser would only resume negotiations if the Ba'ath Party made concessions to the Nasserites in Syria, which the Ba'athists refused to do. The Nasserite cabinet members of the United Arab Front, Nihad al-Qasim, the deputy prime minister and justice minister, and Abd al-Wahhab Hawmad, the finance minister, resigned in protest because of the Ba'ath Party's position on the issue. Propaganda campaigns by both Ba'athist and Nasserite forces ensued in Syria. Bitar and Lu'ay al-Atassi, the NCRC chairman, sharply rebuked the Nasserites.

The Ba'ath Party purged several pro-Egyptian officers from the military between 28 April and 2 May. After the signing of the Federal Union Agreement of 17 April, the Nasserites demanding more power for themselves in the political system. Both parties were averse to power-sharing but the Nasserites were outmaneuvered following the purge of their supporters in the officer corps, which ended their struggle for control over Syria. The Military Committee was adamantly opposed to continued negotiations with Nasser and the Nasserites, and by the time of the purge, Aflaq and Bitar had given up on them.

After the negotiations with Nasser ended, the Syrian government tried to maintain the illusion that they were continuing. On 2 May, Bitar's government issued a decree calling for the nationalization of all Syrian banks. According to historian Itamar Rabinovich, this was probably not the first step to establish a state-owned economy. Rabinovich said that this move was intended to deceive the Egyptians and the Nasserites; Nasser had previously told Bitar that the first step to revolutionary change was the nationalization of the banking sector. Bitar's policy statements at the time were moderate and did not explain the 2 May decree, but planning minister Zuhur stated that the reason for the decree was that the banks were too powerful, were exploiting people, and had too strong an influence within the political system.

The purge of pro-Egyptian officers led the Nasserite cabinet members who had resigned on 25 March, to publicly tender their resignations for a second time on 6 May. The Nasserites said that they would withdraw their resignations if all of their demands were met. Not long after, a violent demonstration occurred in Damascus. It was violently put down by Amin al-Hafiz, the interior minister. The short-lived Ba'athist–Nasserite coalition government was dissolved on 11 May, and on 13 May, Bitar presented his second cabinet.

==== Second cabinet: 13 May – 4 August 1963 ====
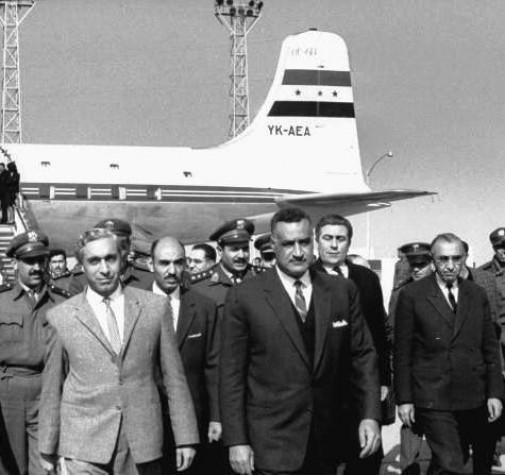
Hafiz at Cairo Airport in August 1963 being greeted by Nasser. Bitar is standing to the far right

Bitar's second cabinet was composed largely of Ba'athists and independents, however, six ministerial portfolios were left vacant for a possible reconciliation with the Nasserites. Hafiz was appointed deputy prime minister and also continued as interior minister. Unionist Ba'ath officials—such as Zuhur, Jamal al-Atassi and Sami Droubi—were not included in Bitar's second cabinet. General Ghassan Haddad, an independent, took over Zuhur's post as planning minister and Ziad al-Hariri, the independent chief of staff, was appointed defense minister. The formation of Bitar's second cabinet began a new phase in Egyptian–Syrian relations; the Egyptian government stated that Bitar's cabinet was an "unjustified blow to the Union's state". The Syrian media and press reported in kind, but their communiques made clear distinctions between Nasser and the "incompetent" people within the Egyptian government.

A power struggle between Hariri and the Military Committee occurred between 23 June and 8 July 1963. The Military Committee viewed Hariri's independent power base with unease. Bitar supported Hariri in his conflict against the Military Committee; presumably believing that Hariri worked as a check on the Military Committee's growing power. On 23 June, when Hariri was on a diplomatic visit to Algiers, the Military Committee transferred his supporters from sensitive military posts and demoted Hariri to become Syria's military attaché in Washington. On the same day, a new Agrarian Reform Law—which abolished the 1962 Agrarian Reform Law and amending the 1958 one—was published. Bitar had promised to introduce a new agrarian law for some time; according to Rabinovich its publication was "probably fixed so as to serve the Ba'ath in its struggle against Hariri". Hariri resisted the committee's move and promptly returned to Damascus to marshal his supporters. Neither Hariri nor the Committee sought a violent confrontation, and when it became clear that the committee had a larger following in the officer corps, Hariri admitted defeat and left the country. He left for Paris on 8 July and was accompanied to the airport by Haddad and Bitar. Bitar reportedly had tears in his eyes when he said goodbye because he believed that without Hariri, the committee would have full control over the military, leaving the civilian leadership considerably weaker in its competition for control of the Ba'ath Party.

On 18 July, Jassem Alwan, a Nasserite officer, launched a coup against the Ba'athists. The coup failed but the Ba'athists' violent suppression of it was controversial—20 suspected conspirators were immediately executed. President Atassi was removed from his post on 27 July and was replaced by Hafiz; according to Rabinovich, the Ba'athists thought it unnecessary to have an independent figurehead after the failed 18 July coup. Alwan's attempted coup and Atassi's demotion affected Egyptian–Syrian relations. On 22 July, the traditional date for Nasser's Revolution Day address, Nasser stated that Egypt had withdrawn from the Federal Union Agreement, blaming the Ba'athists for the withdrawal. He condemned the Ba'ath as irreligious and heretical; the latter was particularly effective because many Syrian Muslims viewed the Ba'ath Party's open embrace of secularism and the fact that many party officials were Christians or belonged to heterodox Muslim sects with disdain. Once order had been restored after the coup attempt, Bitar dissolved his cabinet and appointed a new one on 4 August.

==== Third cabinet: 4 August – 11 November 1963 ====
In contrast to his second cabinet, no vacant portfolios were left for a possible re-accommodation with the Nasserites. The cabinet was composed of Ba'athists and unionist independents, who were brought in to signify wide popular support for the government. Hafiz left the cabinet and was succeeded as interior minister by Nureddin al-Atassi. Bitar's third cabinet was the first in which the Ba'athists controlled the government.

However, things were not going according to Bitar's and Aflaq's plan. The reconstituted party was divided into many factions which differed on policy issues, but most of them supported Aflaq's ouster as Secretary General of the National Command. Immediately after the attempted coup, Aflaq and Bitar re-delegated basic organizational work to Hammud al-Shufi—the eventual Regional Secretary of the Syrian Regional Branch. By doing this, they were giving momentum to their opponents. Shufi, who was at first believed to be an Aflaq supporter, was a radical Marxist. Shufi's group, which controlled the Syrian Regional Command, became allies of the Military Committee in their fight to topple Aflaq and Bitar. Aflaq and Bitar could not rely upon support in the National Command from the Iraqis; the Iraqi Regional Branch had undergone a sudden radicalization under the leadership of Ali Salih al-Sa'di. A moderate faction within the Iraqi Regional Branch, headed by Talib El-Shibib and Hazim Jawad, still supported the National Command.

At the 1st Regional Congress (held 5 September) and the 6th National Congress (5–23 October 1963), the erosion of Aflaq's and Bitar's influence became evident. Unlike the highly unorganized March Regional Congress, the 1st Regional Congress followed the party's "Internal Regulation". The elections to the 1st Regional Congress were rigged in favor of the anti-Aflaq civilian factions and supporters of the Military Committee. The doctrinal and political resolutions of the 1st Regional Congress reflected an anti-Aflaqite discourse. Bitar was not elected to the Syrian Regional Command; all eight seats went to supporters of Shufi, who was appointed the Regional Secretary. The majority of the Syrian delegates elected at the 1st Regional Congress were anti-Aflaqites or radical Ba'athists.

Bitar and Aflaq also failed to get elected at the 6th National Congress. Bitar was not elected to the National Command, and of the nine seats allotted to the Syrian and Iraqi Regional Branches, only three were won by moderates. The Points of Departure was approved by the congress, which signaled a radical change in Ba'athist thinking. Arab unity was replaced as the primary ideological focus of the party with a Marxist-inspired definition of socialism called the Arab road to socialism. Bitar, who had reportedly resigned from his post as prime minister after his humiliation at the 1st Regional Congress, was forced to delay his resignation until the aftermath of the 6th National Congress. Bitar's third cabinet was dissolved on 11 November and Hafiz succeeded him as prime minister on 12 November.

=== Second term: 1964 ===
Bitar was reappointed prime minister in the aftermath of the 1964 Hama riot but despite this, the power balance between the Aflaqite old guard and the Military Committee–Regionalist alliance remained unchanged. According to John Devlin, Hafiz's resigned as prime minister because the Military Committee believed that "its people would be better out of the public eye for a while", which Devlin said is the reason Bitar's cabinet did not contain any prominent Military Committee loyalists or Regionalists. The majority of cabinet members were old guard Aflaqites, including party ideologue Abdallah Abd al-Daim as information minister and Fahmi Ashuri as interior minister.

On 24 April, a provisional constitution for Syria was introduced. It stated that principal executive power was to be given to the newly established Presidential Council. The make-up of the Presidential Council was to be decided by the National Revolutionary Council (NRC), which Devlin said, "was but another name for the NCRC". While the NRC was in theory the chief executive and legislative body of the state, the NRC relegated much of its powers to the Presidential Council. In May 1964, the Presidential Council comprised Hafiz as chairman, Umram as Deputy Chairman, Bitar, Nureddin al-Atassi and Mansur al-Atrash. The composition of the Presidential Council showed the power balance between the three major factions more accurately than did Bitar's cabinet. Hafiz, Umran and Nureddin al-Atassi were Military Committee–Regionalist loyalists while Bitar and Atrash were Aflaqite old guards. Bitar was the only member of the Presidential Council who was not a member of either the National Command or the Syrian Regional Command.

Bitar's cabinet tried—within the limits given to it by the Presidential Council—to regain the people's trust in the Ba'ath Party. In a summary of his government's policies, Bitar said it would "provide freedom, security, confidence, equal opportunities, and to safeguard individual personal freedoms and respect for public freedoms." On 27 May, the Presidential Council announced its support for Bitar's policies and said it would try to ensure freedom of speech by educating reactionary and undesirable elements within Syrian society. Bitar eased the public atmosphere slightly; his government released 180 political prisoners in June. It is said that it was Hafiz who decided to release the political detainees, not Bitar. The Provisional Constitution, which ensured the trade unions' independence from the state, did not change the authoritarian nature of the government; either the Cabinet, the Syrian Regional Command or the Military Committee issued a decree which dismissed Khalid al-Hakim as head of the General Federation of Trade Unions (GFTU). Hakim was dismissed because he permitted radical Ba'athists—who supported Shufi and Sadi—to gather and hold meetings at the GFTU.

Bitar resigned from office on 3 October, according to Devlin because he "failed ... to accomplish much beyond getting a constitution issued, easing tensions, and staying in office." Shortly after his resignation, Bitar and Atrash lost their seats on the Presidential Council. The two were replaced by Salah Jadid and Hafiz—both Military Committee–Regionalist loyalists. The National Command was displeased by the military's domination of the state, and its members persuaded Aflaq—who had gone into self-imposed exile—to return to Syria.

=== Third term: 1966 ===
The old guard were humiliated, the new government led by Hafiz initiated several statist measures, and the Military Committee reduced the National Command to a formality. At the 8th National Congress in April 1965, Aflaq did not stand for the Secretary Generalship of the party but was re-elected to the National Command against his will. Munif al-Razzaz succeeded Aflaq as secretary general. In an effort to rebuild the authority of the National Command, Razzaz had to contend with two factions; the Military Committee–Regionalist loyalists who controlled the party in Syria, and the old guard faction led by Aflaq–Bitar. Both Aflaq and Bitar supported a direct approach against the Military Committee–Regionalist alliance, constantly pressing Razzaz to dissolve the Regional Command and to expel what they considered "deviators" from the party. According to Razzaz, Bitar believed most party members supported them in their conflict against the Military Committee–Regionalist alliance. They were incorrect; during a visit to several party branches within Syria, Razzaz learnt that the National Command lacked any significant support at the local level.

In the meantime, a power struggle within the Military Committee between Hafiz and Jadid began. The National Command brokered a compromise between the two, which led to the formation of a new government led by Yusuf Zuayyin and to an extraordinary Regional Congress. Razzaz—who did not want to be seen supporting either side in the conflict—decided to expand the Regional Command membership. Razzaz wanted the Military Committee to co-opt some old guard members into the Regional Command; Aflaq and Bitar asked for nine of the sixteen members to be members "with a pan-Arab outlook"—including Bitar. The Military Committee responded to Aflaq's and Bitar's request by appointing no old guard-affiliated members to the Regional Command; Hafiz was re-elected Regional Secretary and Jadid was elected Assistant Regional Secretary.

By this time, Bitar had begun discussions with Umran, which concluded with the understanding that Umran and Hafiz would act as the party's defenders against the Military Committee and their allies. Bitar informed the National Command about these discussions. To the National Command's dismay, the Regional Command in October and November had strengthened Jadid's position within the armed forces by appointing several Alawites and Druze to senior positions and appointed new provincial governors in Damascus, Hama, Aleppo and other cities. As the power of Jadid and the Military Committee grew, Aflaq, Bitar, Hafiz, Shibli al-Aysami and Ali Ghannam began to support the Regional Command's dissolution on the orders of the National Command. These discussions lasted from 8 December to 20 December 1965; Razzaz, Atrash, Jibran Majdalani and Ali Khalil argued that considering the political situation, the dissolution of the Regional Command would not favour the National Command in any way. Before the factions reached an agreement, forces loyal to Jadid seized control of the army brigade in Homs on 20 December. In the face of such abuse of power, on 22 December the National Command dissolved the Regional Command and appointed a Supreme Command, which included all the National Command members, five other old-guard members—including Bitar—and five places were left for the regionalists, who did not take up the offer. In response to the National Command's orders, Zu'ayyin's government and all the regionalist members of the Presidential Council resigned.

== Assassination and legacy ==
Members of the party's other fractions fled; Bitar and other members of the party's historic leadership were captured and detained in a government guest house. When the new government launched a purge in August that year, Bitar escaped and fled to Beirut.

In 1978, Bitar was pardoned by President Hafez al-Assad, who came to power in 1970. Bitar returned briefly to Damascus; he was not reconciled with Assad and shortly, after a meeting with Assad ended without an agreement, Bitar launched a press campaign against the Syrian government from his exile in Paris, attacking it in a new magazine which he entitled al-Ihyaa al-Arabi, in an echo of the name he and Aflaq had adopted almost forty years before. He was also rumored to be in contact with Syrian opposition figures in Baghdad.

On 21 July 1980, Bitar was shot dead in Paris. That morning, he received a telephone call to meet a journalist at the office of al-Ihiyyaa al-Arabi in Avenue Hoche. As he was exiting the elevator to enter his office, his assassin fired two shots to the back of his head. The identity of his killer was never discovered, but it was reported that Assad ordered the assassination. At the time, Bitar had reported to local authorities in France that he had received death threats by mail and telephone. He took personal measures by limiting his movements.

At the time of the assassination, Bitar held a diplomatic passport issued by South Yemen.

He was portrayed by Stanley Townsend in the 2019 OCS/Netflix miniseries The Spy.

== Books ==
His writings include:

- Al-Siyasah al-Arabiyah bayn al-Mabda wa al-Tatbiq (Arab Policy in Principle and Practice). Beirut: Dar al-Taliah, 1960.
- Nida al-Ba'th (The Baath's Struggle). Beirut: Dar al-Taliah, 1963–1965. Vols. 1-4 contain items by subject.

== Bibliography ==
- Batatu, Hanna (2000). The Old Social Classes and New Revolutionary Movements of Iraq (3rd ed.). Saqi Books. ISBN 0863565204.
- Bidwell, Robin (2012), Dictionary Of Modern Arab History, Routledge, ISBN 978-0-7103-0505-3
- Devlin, John (1975). The Baath Party: a History from its Origins to 1966 (2nd ed.). Hoover Institute Press. ISBN 978-0-8179-6561-7.
- Jankowski, James (2002). Nasser's Egypt, Arab Nationalism, and the United Arab Republic. Lynne Rienner Publishers. ISBN 1588260348.
- Moubayed, Sami M. (2006). Steel & Silk: Men and Women who shaped Syria 1900–2000. Cune Press. ISBN 1-885942-40-0.
- Rabinovich, Itamar (1972). Syria Under the Baʻth, 1963–66: The Army Party Symbiosis. Transaction Publishers. ISBN 0-7065-1266-9.
- Seale, Patrick (1990). Asad of Syria: The Struggle for the Middle East. University of California Press. ISBN 0-520-06976-5.
