= Abd al-Karim Zahr al-Din =

Syrian military officer

- عبد الكريم زهر الدين
- Zahr al-Din with President Nazim al-Qudsi and Sultan al-Atrash in 1962

Minister of Defence of Syria
- In office 16 April 1962 – 8 March 1963
- President: Nazim al-Qudsi
- Preceded by: Rashad Barmada
- Succeeded by: Muhammad al-Sufi

Abd al-Karim Zahr al-Din (Arabic: عبد الكريم زهر الدين) was a Syrian military officer. He served as the Minister of Defence from 16 April 1962 to 8 March 1963.
