= Jamal al-Atassi =

Syrian politician (1922–2000)

Jamal al-Atassi جمال الأتاسي
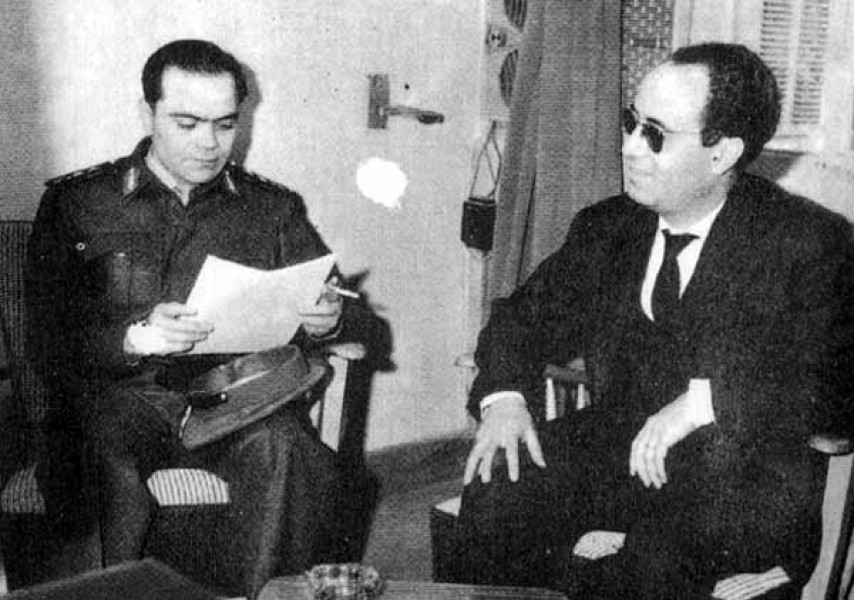
- Lu'ay al-Atassi (left) with Jamal al-Atassi

Minister of Information
- In office 9 March 1963 – 27 July 1963
- President: Lu'ay al-Atassi
- Prime Minister: Salah al-Din al-Bitar

Personal details
- Born: April 1922 Homs, French Syria
- Died: 30 March 2000 (aged 77)
- Party: Democratic Arab Socialist Union
- Other political affiliations: Arab Socialist Union (until 1972); Syrian Regional Branch of the Arab Socialist Ba'ath Party (until 1966)
- Children: Suheir Atassi
- Education: Damascus University
- Occupation: Clinical Psychologist; Journalist

Jamal Al-Atassi (1922−2000) (Arabic: جمال الأتاسي) was a Syrian Arab nationalist, politician and author. He was one of the earliest ideologues of the nascent Syrian Ba'ath Party, which he joined soon after it was founded. He helped to lay out its constitution and was the man who came up with the party's motto, "One united Arab Nation with an eternal Message." He also served as chief editor of the party's daily newspaper, Al Baath. His daughter, Suheir Atassi, is also a politician and the head of the Assistance Coordination Unit.

== Early life ==
Atassi belonged to a prominent political family, and was educated at Damascus University where he earned a PhD in clinical psychology in 1947. He practiced in this field from 1950-1958, in his home town and Atassi political base of Homs, until lured into the public arena by the Arab nationalist movement led by the Egyptian president, Gamal Abdel Nasser. Atassi strongly supported the union with Egypt that formed the United Arab Republic in 1958. Once again eschewing his medical training, Atassi returned to journalism and became chief editor of the pro-Nasser daily, Al Jamaheer (The Masses) until the union became defunct in 1961. During this time he worked, lectured and campaigned in favor of Nasser. When a coup in Syria dissolved the union, he became a vocal member of the opposition dedicated to restoring the UAR.

This position put him at odds with the country's new democratic government led by Nazim al-Kudsi, and he was a political outcast during those years from 1961 to 1963, when a new coup in March of that year brought to power a more nationalist and unionist wing of the Baath. Jamal's own cousin, the future president Nureddin al-Atassi became Minister of the Interior, and Jamal became Minister of Information in the cabinet of Prime Minister Salah al-Din al-Bitar, one of the founders of the Baath party. He was also voted into the party's Revolutionary Command Council. A mere four months later Atassi resigned after coming to the realization that restoration of the UAR was not a party priority. He then formed his own party, the Arab Socialist Union, an umbrella group of dedicated unionists who wanted to restore the UAR and reappoint Nasser as president of Syria.

Jamal Al-Atassi with Sami Droubi translated Frantz Fanon's book The Wretched of the Earth into Arabic.

== Political Opposition ==
In 1970, Jamal al-Atassi supported Hafez al-Assad after the a coup that ousted his cousin Nureddin as president. He hoped Assad would take a harder line on reunification with Egypt. In March 1972, Assad formed the National Progressive Front, a Baath-led coalition of socialist parties. He invited Atassi, who by this time was one of the most venerated nationalists in the country, to join a 13-member committee delegated with administering the NPF's political affairs. Realizing that Assad opposed restoring the UAR or the NPF, he left within a year and formed a new organization, the Democratic Arab Socialist Union. Assad promptly outlawed it and sought to isolate Atassi, who was therefore never allowed to enter parliament.

== Later life ==
From that time until his death, he continued to extoll pan-Arabism and worked for this ideal, albeit within the rigid confines of the Assad dictatorship. Together with other illegal parties, his DASU formed the National Democratic Rally in 1980, to act as a sort of mirror version to the NPF. Jamal al-Atassi became its official spokesman. Such was his stature at the time of his death, that Assad ordered him a semi-official state funeral, honoring him as a patriot of conviction and principle. In a family of political giants, Jamal al-Atassi managed to carve for himself a distinct place in the Syrian political landscape, and commanded wide respect among his countrymen despite his continued opposition to the Assad government. He was known as a great political mind with his own views on Arabism and socialism. His death was followed closely by the death of Assad himself in 2000.

During the Damascus Spring (June 2000 through the autumn of 2001), a reformist pro-democracy political discussion forum was named in his honor, until it was disbanded in a crackdown by the Syrian Government.

== Literary works ==
- The History of European Socialism
- Socialism: Its Past and Future
- The Ideology of Karl Marx
- Gamal Abdel Nasser: The Revolutionary Experience
- Articles on Socialism (With Michel Aflaq and Munif al-Razzaz).
