= Forward (Syrian magazine) =

Defunct Syrian English-language magazine

- Editor in Chief: Sami Moubayed
- Staff writers: Ruba Saqer, Mehdi Rifai
- Categories: Newsmagazine
- Frequency: Monthly
- Circulation: 12,000 monthly
- Publisher: Abdulsalam Haykal
- First issue: 5 January 2007
- Final issue: November 2011
- Company: Haykal Media
- Country: Syria
- Based in: Damascus
- Language: English

Forward Magazine was a Syrian English-language newsmagazine published monthly in Damascus existed from January 2007 to November 2011.

It was the first private English-language periodical to be licensed in Syria since all private media was nationalized by Gamal Abdel Nasser in 1958 during the short-lived Syrian-Egyptian union. The magazine started in January 2007 with the motto, "The Only Way is Forward." In December 2009, Forward launched its digital edition in collaboration with Pressmart Media.

== History ==
Forward was founded by media and technology entrepreneur Abdulsalam Haykal. The first edition appeared on 10 October. According to a statement on the magazine's website, Forward was built "on the firm conviction that the only way is forward in Syria and other options do not exist." While the magazine claimed to be "the only balanced, local, and reliable source of information on Syria in the English language," some observers dubbed it as "pro-regime."

The magazine was able to attract several leading media figures as contributors including David Ignatius of The Washington Post, Hala Gorani of CNN, and Riz Khan of al-Jazeera. It featured exclusive interviews with international figures including former US President Jimmy Carter, Turkey's Prime Minister Recep Tayyip Erdoğan, French Foreign Minister Bernard Kouchner, German Foreign Minister Joschka Fischer, and Syria's First Lady Asma al-Assad.

The magazine established its own blog, Untold Damascene Stories, with its own writers as the blog's contributors.

== American focus ==
Forward Magazine had an American focus in its coverage of international affairs, and was supportive of Barack Obama's election. It was critical of the American President's dealings with Israel, warning that US policy towards nuclear nations would allow Israel to have a hand in future terror attacks against the United States. It also stated that Israel was behind the murder of Rafic Hariri but Obama, not wanting to not alienate Jewish voters, refused to allow special tribunals to consider Israel as a suspect but instead maintain focus on only Hizbollah and Syria.

One of Forward's regular contributors was Imad Moustapha, Syria's Ambassador to the United States. In April 2007, Forward ran an article by US Institute of Peace specialist Scott Lasensky on "How to move the Syria-American relations forward?" In June 2007, another piece by Hind Kabawat stressed a similar notion of how cultural exchange can be a tool for better relations between Syria and the US. In August 2007, Imad Moustapha gave an interview for Forward Magazine in which he stated about the American government: "I don’t spare them and they don’t spare me. It is a fair game."

In November 2008, Forward ran the headline: "To our American readers" on its front cover. The 14-page series of articles and photographs denounced the American strike on Abu Kamal, a city in North-eastern Syria, and depicted blood-stained concrete from the attack site. Earlier in July 2008, Forward ran a story by the American writer Scott C. Davis on "What Michelle Obama can learn from Asma al-Assad." In December 2008, Forward ran a series of articles to mark the election of Barack Obama as next president of the United States. The front-cover headline was: "Obamania sweeps away Bushism." The edition included a section titled "10 Syrian Christmas wishes to Obama." Forward featured an interview also with Ambassador Edward Djerejian, head of the James Baker Institute at Rice University.

In March 2008, Forward published an editorial by one of its contributors, T. Hariri, that addresses Obama and what he refers to as "the Bush era:"

The politics of 9-11 would continue to ripple the American fabric through the duration of the near decade of the markedly reactionary Bush era. It was an episode in the theater of American politics whose deliberate policies revealed a reckless abandon: a political-cum-cultural movement retrograde to the American ideals that have always been embedded in potential, and bolstered by historical beginnings, not ends.

== Editorial board ==
Forward Magazine was edited by Syrian historian and writer Sami Moubayed, an author of books, who reports on Syrian affairs with regular contributions to Asia Times, Gulf News, and PostGlobal. In July 2008, he was part of the unofficial Syrian delegation to the United States whose request to meet officials at the State Department was turned down. Together with the other two members of the group, Moubayed was described as a "regime-sanctioned mouthpiece."
