= Muhammad Umran =

Syrian general and politician (1922–1972)

Major General Muhammad Umran
- محمد عمران
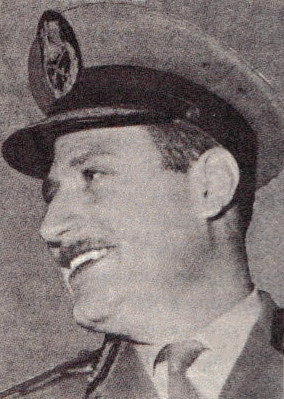

Minister of Defence
- In office 1 September 1965 – 14 February 1966
- President: Amin al-Hafez
- Preceded by: Hamad Ubayd
- Succeeded by: Hafez al-Assad

Member of the Regional Command of the Syrian Regional Branch
- In office 1 February 1964 – 4 April 1965

Vice President of Syria
- In office 8 March 1963 – 15 December 1964
- Succeeded by: Nureddin al-Atassi

Personal details
- Born: 1922 al-Mukharram, French Mandate of Syria
- Died: March 4, 1972 (aged 49–50) Tripoli, Lebanon
- Cause of death: Assassination
- Party: Ba'ath Party

Military service
- Allegiance: France (1942–1946); First Syrian Republic (1946–1950); Second Syrian Republic (1950–1958); United Arab Republic (1958–1961); Second Syrian Republic (1961–1963); Ba'athist Syria (1963–1966)
- Branch/service: Syrian Arab Army
- Years of service: 1942–1966
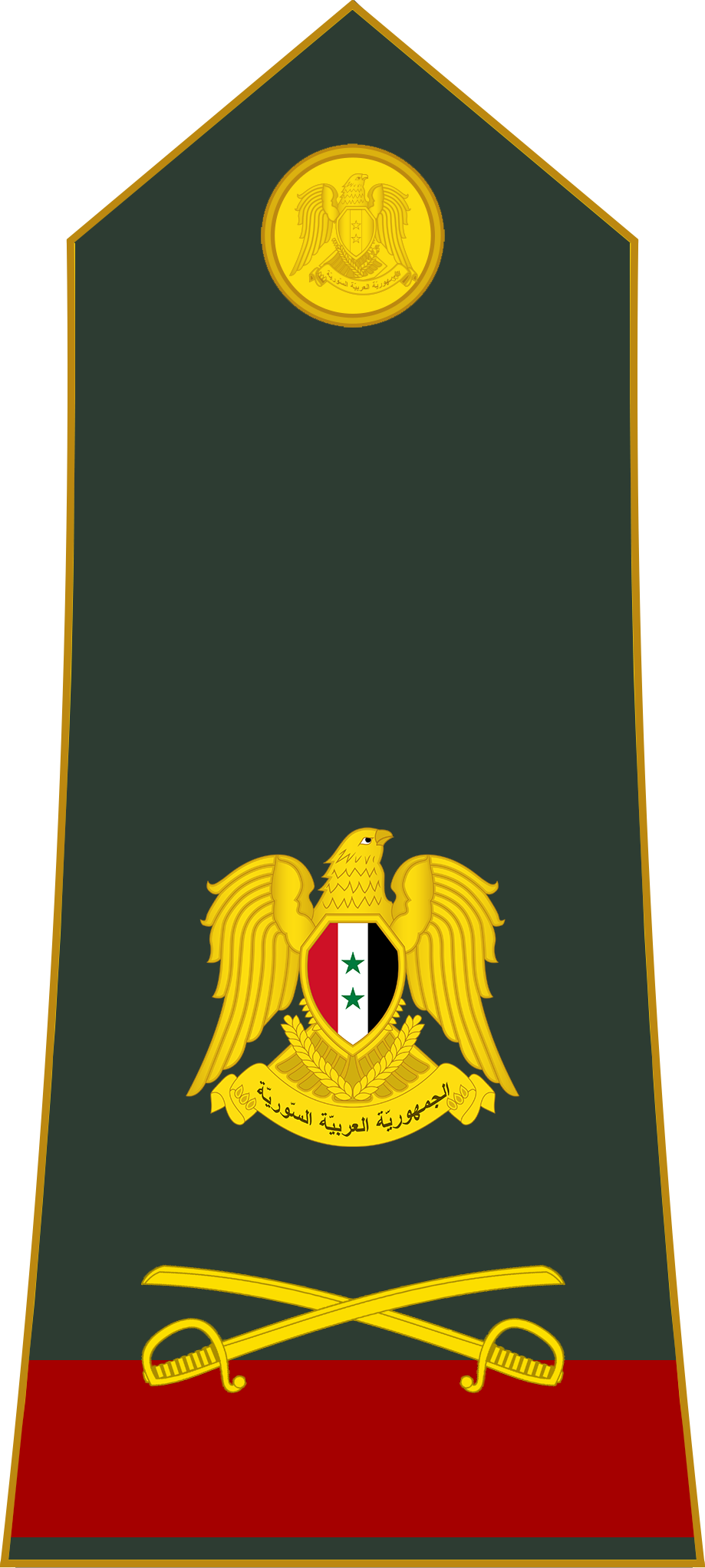
- Rank: Major General
- Battles/wars: 1948 Arab–Israeli War

Major General Muhammad Umran (Arabic: محمد عمران; 1922 – 4 March 1972) was a Syrian military officer and founding member of the Military Committee of the unitary Ba'ath Party. He was a leading figure in Syrian politics from the 1963 Syrian coup d'état until the 1966 coup d'état.

== Life and career ==
Umran was born in 1922 into an Alawite smallholder family which belonged to the Khayyatin tribe. He hailed from al-Mukharram, a village situated in the mountains east of Homs. He studied at the Homs Military Academy and joined the Ba'ath Party in 1947. Umran served in the Syrian Army during the 1948 Arab–Israeli War, and became active in politics following the military's forceful intervention in Syrian politics during the 1940s and 1950s. He played a small role under the aegis of Akram al-Hawrani in the 1954 uprising against Adib Shishakli's rule.

He was one of the five founding members of the Military Committee, the other founding members were Hafez al-Assad, Salah Jadid, Ahmad al-Mir and Abd al-Karim al-Jundi, but acted as the committee's leading mind. Umran was the committee's chairman until the 8th of March Revolution in 1963, and was the oldest committee member. In the beginning, the Military Committee's goal was to rebuild the Ba'ath Party, which had been dissolved on the orders of Gamal Abdel Nasser when the United Arab Republic was founded, and establish a new party leadership. During the UAR years, Umran and Jadid travelled the country and established contact with former party comrades, but without mentioning the existence of the Military Committee. In the immediate aftermath of the UAR's dissolution, Umran contacted the other members of the Military Committee, and asked about the possibility of launching a coup to reestablish the union. He had outlined the political climate in Syria, and compared the strength of the Ba'ath Party against other political opponents – he reached the conclusion that a coup could be successful.

Umran was a delegate at the 5th National Congress of the Ba'ath Party, and told Michel Aflaq of the Military Committee's intentions – Aflaq consented to a military coup to take power, but no agreement was made between him and the Military Committee on how to share power after seizing power. Following the 8th of March Revolution in 1963 which brought the Syrian Regional Branch of the Ba'ath Party to power in Syria, Umran was first given the command of the 5th Brigade in Homs, but was promoted in June to become commander of the 70th Armoured Brigade. Umran was appointed Deputy Prime Minister in the Salah al-Din al-Bitar's cabinet, the first Ba'athist government in Syrian history.

After taking power, Umran became a member of the National Council for the Revolutionary Command (NCRC), the leading decision-making organ. The organ was controlled more-or-less by the Military Committee and the Ba'ath Party's military wing, and important decisions were made without the collaboration of their civilian colleagues. After complaints from the civilian wing, Umran gave the civilian wing (represented by Aflaq, al-Bitar and Mansur al-Atrash among others) a faint idea of what the military leadership was up to. Due to his allegiance to the civilian wing, he was stripped of his military title by the Military Committee and was appointed an ambassador in Spain, as a form of exile for dissidents.

Umran was ousted from his position during the 1966 Syrian coup d'état by his former Military Committee comrades and was subsequently jailed in Mezzeh Prison. He was released following the 1967 Six-Day War with Israel, which ended in the latter's occupation of Syria's Golan Heights. Following his release, he fled to Lebanon.

== Death ==
Umran was shot and killed outside of his home in Tripoli, Lebanon on 4 March 1972.
