= Lu'ay al-Atassi =

Syrian military leader (1926–2003)

- لؤي الأتاسي
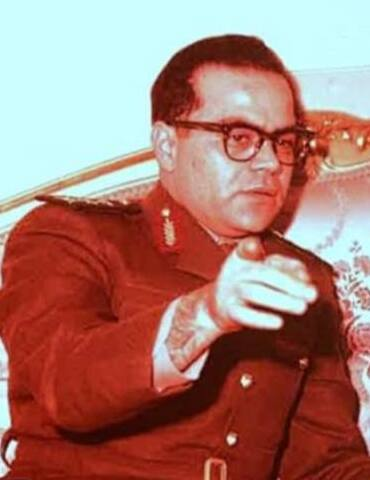
- Atassi in 1963

President of Syria
- In office 9 March 1963 – 27 July 1963
- Prime Minister: Khalid al-Azm; Salah al-Din al-Bitar
- Vice President: Muhammad Umran
- Preceded by: Nazim al-Kudsi
- Succeeded by: Amin al-Hafiz

Personal details
- Born: 1926 Homs, State of Syria
- Died: 24 November 2003 (aged 76–77) Homs, Syrian Arab Republic
- Party: Independent

Military service
- Allegiance: First Syrian Republic (1948–1950); Second Syrian Republic (1950–1958); United Arab Republic (1958–1961); Second Syrian Republic (1961–1963); Ba'athist Syria (1963)
- Rank: Lieutenant general
- Battles/wars: 1948 Arab–Israeli War
- Atassi became de jure President on 23 March 1963.

Lu'ay al-Atassi (Arabic: لؤي الأتاسي, romanized: Luʾayy al-ʾAtāsī; 1926 − 24 November 2003) was a Syrian military officer who served as the president of Syria from March 1963 until his resignation in July of that same year.

== Early life and career ==
Atassi was born in Homs in 1926 to the politically prominent Sunni Arab al-Atassi clan. He entered the officer corps after graduating from the Homs Military Academy in the mid-1940s, and fought during the 1948 Arab-Israeli War in Palestine. In 1954, President Hashim al-Atassi appointed him Chief of Military Protocol. He was transferred to Egypt, where he served as the assistant military attache in Cairo's Syrian embassy in 1956. There, he became a supporter of Egyptian President Gamal Abdel Nasser and his pan-Arabist policies. Atassi was among the Syrian officers who lobbied for unity with Egypt, which was realized in February 1958 with the formation of the United Arab Republic (UAR).

Atassi criticized Syria's secession from the union in September 1961 after a military coup in 1961. In April 1962 unionist officers led by Jassem Alwan staged an attempted coup against the government. Alwan, Hamad Ubayd and Muhammad Umran led the effort in Aleppo and Homs, while Atassi led the operation in Deir ez-Zor. According to historian Sami Moubayed, Atassi attempted to mediate a truce between the coup leaders and the government, but was unable. After the coup attempt, he was sent to the Syrian embassy in Washington D.C. to serve as the military attache. The officers were imprisoned and brought to military trial, where Atassi was recalled to testify against them, but refused out of his sympathies with officers. Atassi was consequently arrested and jailed in Damascus's Mezzeh Prison.

== President of Syria ==
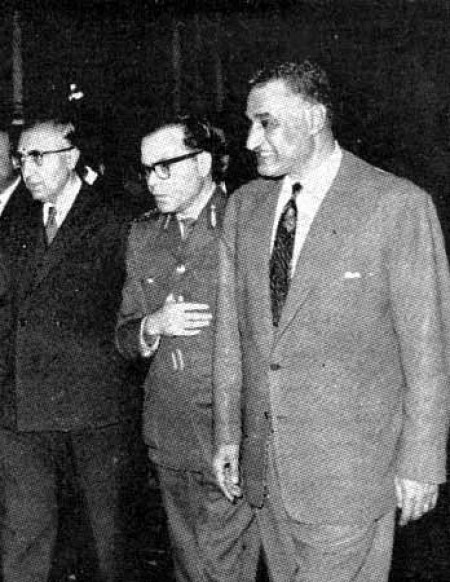
Atassi (center) with Egyptian President Gamal Abdel Nasser (right) and Syrian Prime Minister Salah Bitar (left) during tripartite unity discussions between Egypt, Syria and Iraq in Cairo, early April 1963

On 8 March 1963, a coalition of Arab nationalist officers organized by the Military Committee of the Ba'ath Party launched a military coup, toppling the secessionist government of Nazim al-Qudsi. The officers immediately freed Atassi and appointed him to the National Council for the Revolutionary Command, the effective interim government of the country, and made him president on 23 March. Atassi was a politically independent Arab nationalist and was made Chief-of Staff after its execution. From the Committee's standpoint, Atassi was ideal for the position because he lacked a support base and thus posed no threat to the junta's supremacy. His presidential powers were limited, and in practice he served more as a figurehead leader.

On 18 July Atassi led a Syrian delegation to Alexandria, Egypt, to repair Syrian government relations with Nasser after dozens of Nasserist officers were purged from their high-ranking posts between late April and early May by the Military Committee. On the same day, Nasserist officer Jassem Alwan led a coup against the Ba'athists, but failed. Many people were killed in the coup attempt and 20 participating officers were executed by Ba'athist-dominated government. Disapproving of the manner in which the coup officers were dealt with, Atassi resigned on 27 July. Thereafter, he retired from all political activity.

== Later life and death ==
Atassi lived the remainder of his life in Homs, until his death in November 2003.

== Bibliography ==
- Moubayed, Sami (2006). Steel & Silk: Men and Women Who Shaped Syria 1900-2000. Seattle: Cune Press.
- Rabinovich, Itamar (1972). Syria Under the Baʻth, 1963-66: The Army Party Symbiosis. Transaction Publishers. ISBN 0706512669.
