= National Council for the Revolutionary Command =

Council set up to rule Syria after the 1963 coup d'état

National Council for the Revolutionary Command المجلس الوطني لقيادة الثورة

Type
- Type: Legislative and executive revolutionary council (1963–1964), unicameral parliament (1964–1966) of Syrian Arab Republic

History
- Established: 8 March 1963
- Disbanded: 23 February 1966
- Preceded by: Constituent and Parliamentary Assembly
- Succeeded by: People's Assembly (8th)

Leadership
- President Speaker (from 1965): Lu'ay al-Atassi (1963); Amin al-Hafiz (1963–1965); Mansur al-Atrash (1965–1966)
- Seats: 20 (1963–1964); 95 (1965–1966); 134 (1966)

The National Council for the Revolutionary Command (Arabic: المجلس الوطني لقيادة الثورة, romanized: al-Majlis al-Waṭanī li-Qiyādat al-Thawrah), or just NCRC (also known as the National Council for the Leadership of the Revolution and, from 1964, National Revolutionary Council), was the supreme governing body of Syria during the early Ba'athist period from 1963 to 1966.

It was established following the 8 March 1963 coup, led by the Ba'athist officers in alliance with Nasserists and independent officers, which overthrew the separatist regime that had ruled Syria after seceding from the United Arab Republic. The council existed in two distinct phases: initially as a twenty-man military junta exercising both executive and legislative authority from 1963 until 1964, and later as a formal legislative body following the promulgation of the 1964 provisional constitution.

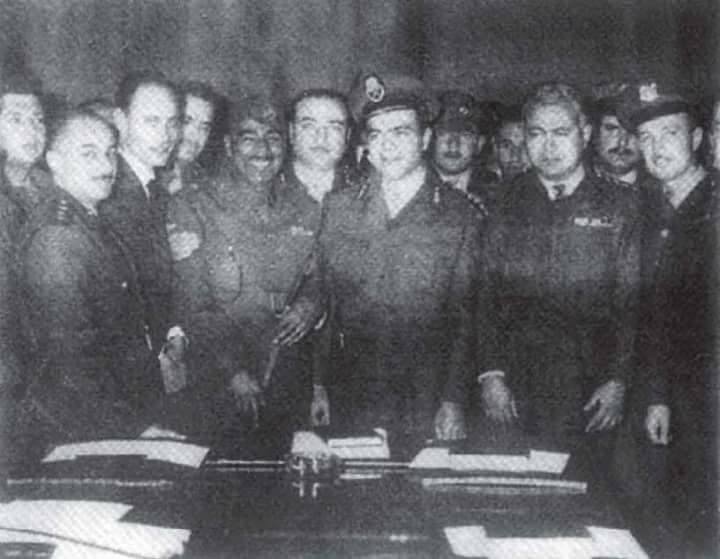
Army officers after the coup.

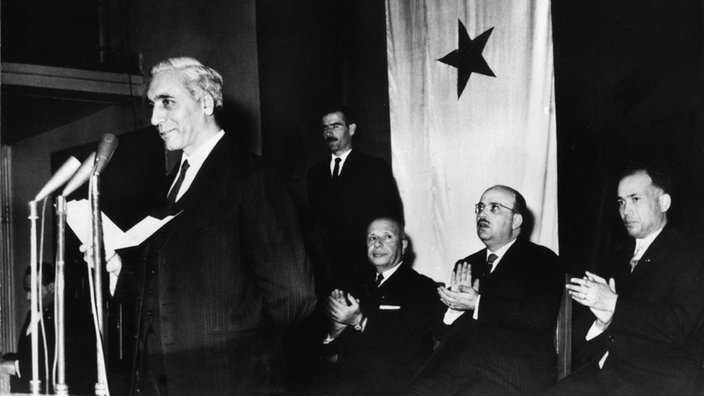
Speech of the Amin al-Hafiz, president of the NCRC.

== Establishment and structure ==
Even before the NCRC's formal establishment, a clandestine Military Committee had been formed to serve as the regime's true seat of power, described as a "junta within a junta." This committee consisted of five key figures: Muhammad Umran (Chairman until 8 March 1963), Salah Jadid, Hafez al-Assad, Abdul-Karim al-Jundi, and Ahmad al-Mir. Parallel to the Council, a specialised military organisation was established, comprising twelve branches that mirrored their civilian counterparts. This organisation was governed by a central committee that acted as a direct proxy for the Military Committee.

The new government's primary diplomatic objective was the formation of an Arab union involving Iraq (where the Ba'athists had seized power in February 1963) and the United Arab Republic (as Egypt was officially known at the time). While the Syrian Ba'athists, bowing to pressure from pro-Nasserist demonstrators, initially signaled a desire to restore the former union with Egypt, these declarations were largely superficial. No concrete steps toward unification were taken. On the contrary, between 28 April and 2 May, the junta purged dozens of Nasserist officers from the Syrian army, and by late 1963, the Ba'athist regime in Iraq had been overthrown.

On 25 April 1964, a provisional constitution consisting of 82 articles was promulgated. The constitution renamed the NCRC to the National Revolutionary Council and turned it into a legislature. Executive authority was granted to a Presidential Council and Council of Ministers elected from among the council's members.

After assuming legislative functions, the National Revolutionary Council convened for three distinct sessions:

- 1st special session: 1 September 1965 – 30 September 1965
- 1st ordinary session: 5 October 1965 – 14 December 1965
- 2nd ordinary session: 15 February 1966 – 23 February 1966

== Leadership ==
=== Bureau of the National Revolutionary Council ===
Position	Name	Party	Tenure
Speaker	Mansur al-Atrash	Ba'ath Party	1 September 1965 – 23 February 1966
Deputy Speaker	Muzhir al-Anbari		1 September 1965 – 23 February 1966
Secretary	Ahmad al-Khatib	Ba'ath Party	1 September 1965 – 23 February 1966
Secretary	Khairi Shalati		1 September 1965 – 23 February 1966
Overseer	Abd al-Ilah Assi		1 September – 14 December 1965
Overseer	Muhammad Asaad al-Hamad		1 September 1965 – 23 February 1966
Overseer	Ibrahim Shahada		15–23 February 1966

== Members ==
The NCRC was originally composed of twelve Ba'athists, eight Nasserists and independents. Its exact membership remained a state secret during its first months of operation. Although some civilians were eventually admitted, the Council was strictly dominated by military officers.

Following a conference in August 1965, a new Regional Command of the Ba'ath Party was elected, and the first National Revolutionary Council in accordance with the Provisional Constitution was formed under Law No. 1, issued by Amin al-Hafiz on 23 August 1965. (1)(2)

The law set the number of council members at 95, representing the following popular groups:

- Current members of the NRC
- Syrian members of the National Command of the Arab Socialist Ba'ath Party
- Members of the Regional Command of the Arab Socialist Ba'ath Party in the Syrian Arab Region
- General Federation of Trade Unions
- General Union of Peasants
- Teachers' Union
- Representatives from the military sector
- Representatives from the women's sector
- Representatives from the unions of lawyers, doctors, engineers, and pharmacists
- Representatives from university teaching bodies
- Progressive citizens

After the council was formed, tensions escalated between the Regional Command and the National Command of the Ba'ath Party, leading the National Command to dissolve the Regional Command and form a replacement. Since the dissolved Regional Command's members had been part of the first council, a new council was constituted without them — excluding figures such as Salah Jadid, Abd al-Karim al-Jundi, Salim Hatum, and Marwan Habash — while the National Command retained Hafez al-Assad and Ibrahim Makhous in the new council, as they were members of the National Command.

The new council included Syrian members of the National Command, military representatives, delegates from various Syrian institutions and organisations, as well as a number of independents and members of the Arab Socialist Unionists party.

== Dissolution ==
On 23 February 1966, the National Revolutionary Council was dissolved following the 1966 coup d'état by dissident army officers. Subsequently, the provisional constitution of 1964 was suspended, and legislative and executive powers were transferred to the presidency and government.
