= Sami Moubayed =

Syrian historian and writer (born 1978)

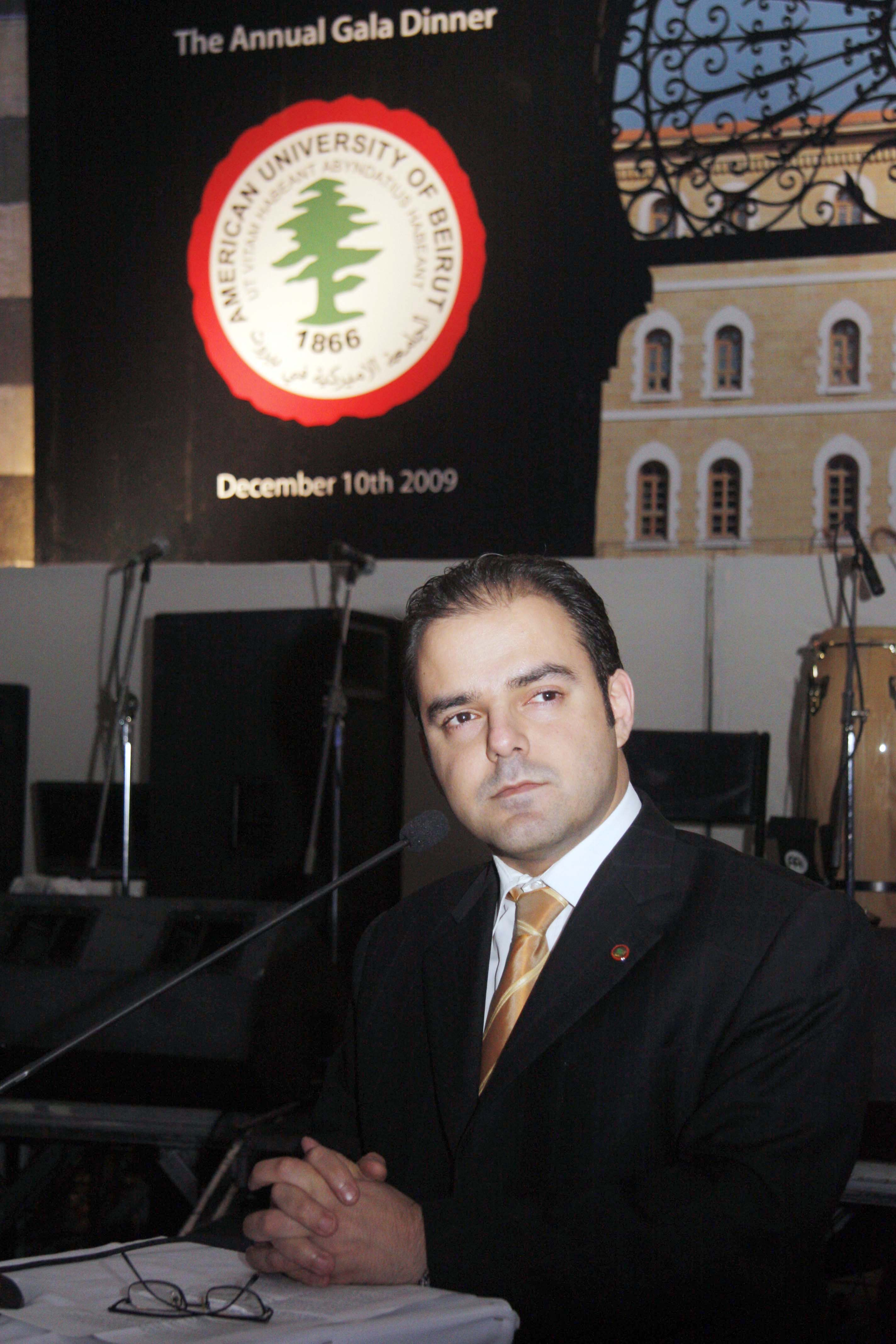
- Sami Moubayed speaking at the AUB Damascus Chapter in 2009
- Born: 16 July 1978 (age 48); London
- Occupation: Historian
- Writing career
- Subjects: Syria and the Middle East
- Website: www.syrianhistory.com

Sami Moubayed (Arabic: سامي مروان مبيّض; born 16 July 1978) is a Syrian historian and writer whose works cover the modern history of Damascus from the late Ottoman period until the creation of the United Arab Republic in 1958.

In 2017, he co-founded the Damascus History Foundation, a non-governmental organization, aimed at preserving the archives of the ancient city of Damascus.

== Biography ==
Sami Moubayed, a native of Damascus, studied at the Faculty of Political Science at the American University of Beirut (AUB). Moubayed, obtained his PhD in Middle East Studies from the University of Exeter, specializing in the founding years of the Syrian Republic. During his college years, Moubayed was mentored by Munir al-Ajlani, a parliamentarian and politician from the pre-Baath Era. His first book, The Politics of Damascus 1920–1946, was published under Ajlani's supervision in 1998.

In 2000, Moubayed joined the Arab Political Document Center at AUB and worked as a journalist with Beirut-based The Daily Star. Between 2005 and 2011, Moubayed taught at the Faculty of International Relations at the University of Kalamoon in Deir Atiyah, 88-km north of the capital Damascus, while serving on its Board of Trustees. Between January 2007 and December 2011, he was editor-in-chief of Forward Magazine. In 2012, he joined the Carnegie Endowment for International Peace in Beirut, serving as a scholar on Syria until early 2014.

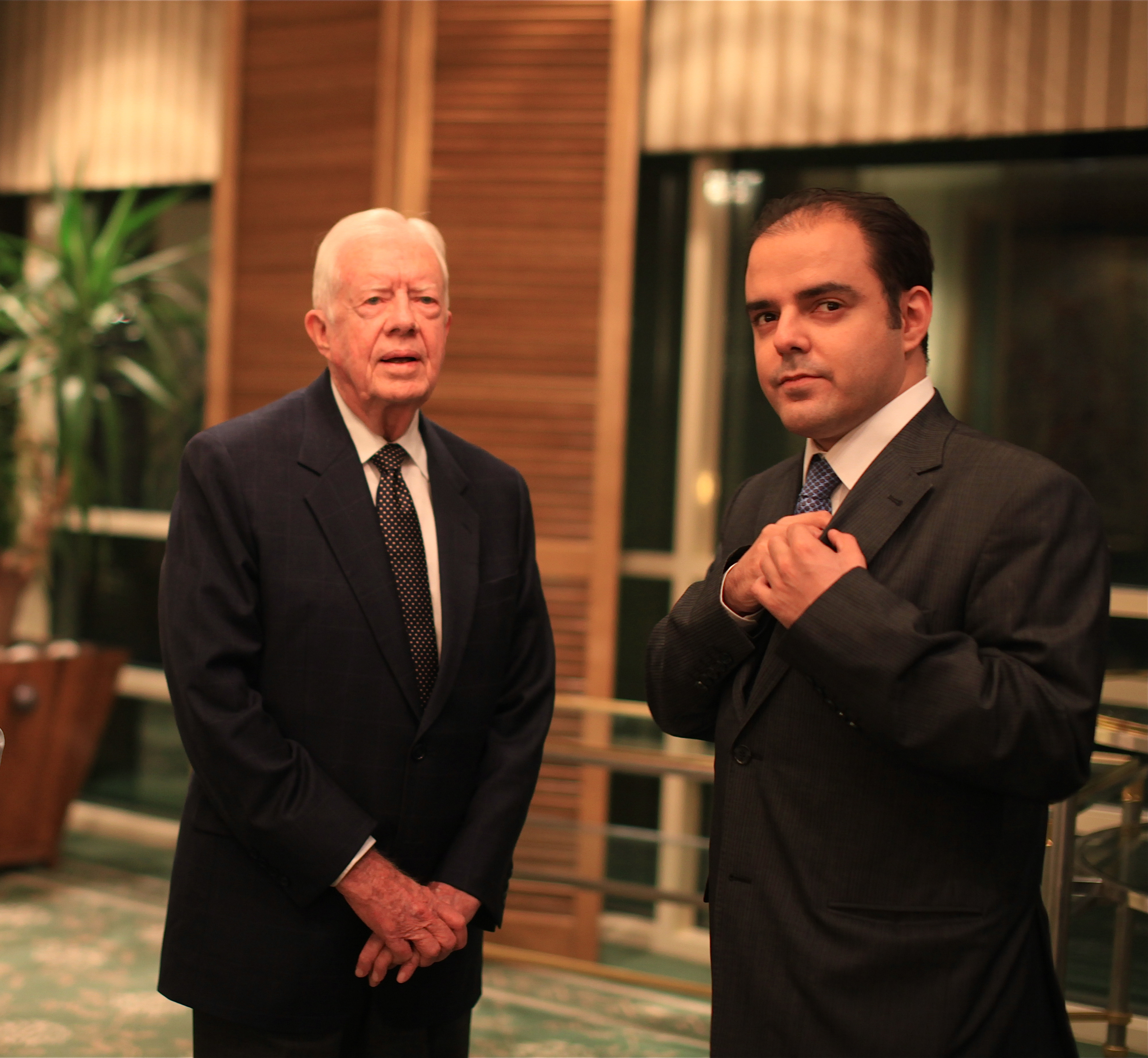
Moubayed interviewing former US President Jimmy Carter

== Works ==
In 2004, along with Syrian web-designer Sahban Abd Rabbo, Moubayed co-founded www.syrianhistory.com, an online museum of Syrian history containing over 10,000 photographs, documents, and rare audiovisual material on Syria during the years 1900–2000. The website also contains unpublished audio clips from historical Syrian figures.

Moubayed has written much about pre-Baath Syria and advocated for a political solution to the Syrian civil war. In 2016, was voted into the London-based Royal Historical Society.

=== Selected works ===
He is the author of several books on modern Syria, including:

- The Politics of Damascus 1920-1946, (Damascus, 1998)
- Damascus Between Democracy and Dictatorship, (Maryland, 2000)
- Steel & Silk: Men and Women Who Shaped Syria 1900-2000, (Cune Press, 2005)
- Syria and the USA: From Wilson to Eisenhower, (IB Tauris, 2012)
- Under the Black Flag: At the Frontier of the New Jihad, (IB Tauris, 2015)
- Forgotten Tales from Damascus: Four Stories 1916-1936, (Arabic, Riad El Rayyes Books, Beirut 2016)
- East of the Grand Umayyad: Damascene Freemasonry 1868-1965, (Arabic, Riad El Rayyes Books, Beirut 2017)
- West of the Damascus Synagogue (Arabic, Riad El Rayyes Books, Beirut 2018)
- The Makers of Modern Syria 1918-1958: The rise and fall of Syrian Democracy 1918-1958 (IB Tauris, London 2018)

In 2015, he compiled the correspondences of Syrian nationalist Abdul Rahman Shahbandar and Prime Minister Hasan al-Hakim, originally written during the years 1926–1936. In 2018, he edited and compiled the memoirs of Husni al-Barazi, Syria's Prime Minister during World War II, and Ahmad al-Sharabati, Syria's defense minister during the Arab-Israeli War of 1948.
