= Itamar Rabinovich =

Israeli diplomat and academic (born 1942)

- איתמר רבינוביץ
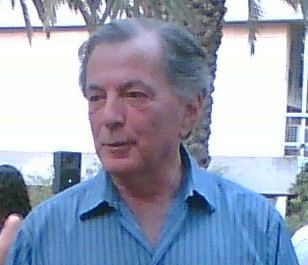

Ambassador of Israel to the United States
- In office 1993–1996
- Preceded by: Zalman Shoval
- Succeeded by: Eliahu Ben-Elissar

Personal details
- Born: 8 October 1942 (age 83) Jerusalem, British Mandate of Palestine
- Education: Tel Aviv University
- Occupation: Professor
- Website: www.itamarrabinovich.tau.ac.il

Itamar Rabinovich (Hebrew: איתמר רבינוביץ; born 8 October 1942) is the president of the Israel Institute (Washington and Jerusalem). He was Israel's Ambassador to the United States in the 1990s and former chief negotiator with Syria between 1993 and 1996, and the former president of Tel Aviv University (1999–2007). Currently he is professor emeritus of Middle Eastern History at Tel Aviv University, distinguished global professor at New York University and a distinguished fellow at the Brookings Institution.

== Biography ==
Itamar Rabinovich received a B.A. degree from the Hebrew University of Jerusalem, an M.A. from Tel Aviv University, and a Ph.D. from the University of California, Los Angeles.

== Academic career ==
Rabinovich has been a member of Tel Aviv University's faculty since 1971, and served as Ettinger Professor of the Contemporary History of the Middle East, chairman of the Department of Middle Eastern Studies, director of the Moshe Dayan Center for Middle Eastern and African Studies, and Dean of Humanities and Rector. He is the president of the Israel Institute (Washington and Jerusalem). He was president of Tel Aviv University (1999–2007) (following Yoram Dinstein, and succeeded by Zvi Galil).

Currently he is professor emeritus of Middle Eastern History at Tel Aviv University, distinguished global professor at New York University, and a distinguished fellow at the Brookings Institution.

== Diplomatic career ==
He was Israel's Ambassador to the United States in the 1990s and former chief negotiator with Syria between 1993 and 1996.

== Published works ==
=== Books ===
- Syria under the Baʻth, 1963–66. Israel Universities Press. 1972. ISBN 0-70-651266-9.
- With Haim Shaked (1978). From June to October: The Middle East between 1967 and 1973. Transaction Books. ISBN 0-87-855230-8.
- With Haim Shaked (1980). The Middle East and the United States: Perceptions and Policies. Transaction Books. ISBN 0-87-855752-0.
- The War for Lebanon, 1970–1985. Cornell University Press. 1985. ISBN 0-80-149313-7.
- The Road Not Taken: Early Arab–Israeli Negotiations. Oxford University Press. 1991. ISBN 978-0-19-506066-9.
- The Brink of Peace: The Israeli–Syrian Negotiations. Princeton University Press. 1999. ISBN 0-69-101023-4.
- Waging Peace: Israel and the Arabs, 1948–2003. Princeton University Press. 2004. ISBN 0-69-111982-1.
- With Jehuda Reinharz (2008). Israel in the Middle East: Documents and Readings on Society, Politics, and Foreign Relations, Pre-1948 to the Present. Brandeis University Press. ISBN 978-0-87-451962-4.
- The View from Damascus: State, Political Community and Foreign Relations in Twentieth-Century Syria. Vallentine Mitchell. 2008. ISBN 978-0-85-303800-9.
- The Lingering Conflict: Israel, The Arabs, and the Middle East, 1948–2012 (revised ed.). Brookings Institution Press. 2013. ISBN 978-0-81-572437-7.
- Rabinovitch, Itamar (2017). Yitzhak Rabin : soldier, leader, statesman. Yale University Press.
- Middle Eastern Maze : Israel, the Arabs, and the Region, 1948-2022. Brookings Institution Press. 2022.

=== Critical studies of his work ===
- Shindler, Colin (September 2017). "Israel's independent introvert". Reviews. History Today. 67 (9): 104–105.

== Awards and recognition ==
In 1992, he won the National Jewish Book Award in the Israel category for The Road Not Taken: Early Arab-Israeli Negotiations

He received Commandeur de l'Ordre des Palmes Académiques from France.

Rabinovitch is a member of the American Philosophical Society and the American Academy of Arts and Sciences. He has been awarded the Honorary Grand Golden Cross of the Austrian Republic.
