= Syrian invasion of Jordan =

Short-lived invasion during Black September

- Part of Black September and the Arab Cold War
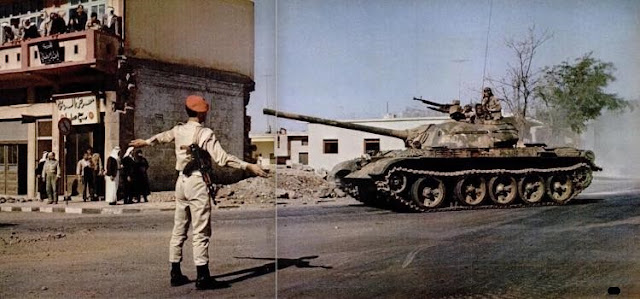
- T-54 tank of the Syrian army during invasion.
Date	18–23 September 1970
Location	Northern Jordan
Result	Jordanian victory: Syrian invasion repelled

Belligerents
Ba'athist Syria; PLO: Fatah; (Popular Front for the Liberation of Palestine) PFLP; (Democratic Front for the Liberation of Palestine) DFLP	Jordan

Commanders and leaders
(Ba'athist Syria) Nureddin al-Atassi (Ba'athist Syria) Salah Jadid (Palestine) Yasser Arafat	(Jordan) Hussein (Jordan) Habis Majali (Jordan) Zeid bin Shaker

Strength
16,000 troops 250–300 tanks and armoured vehicles	65,000–74,000 troops 500 tanks and armoured vehicles

Casualties and losses
Jordanian claim: 1,500 casualties 135 tanks lost Israeli claim: 120 tanks lost of which 30-60 mechanical breakdowns	Jordanian claim: 112 casualties 16 tanks and 1 armored car destroyed

The Syrian invasion of Jordan began on 18 September 1970 in support of the Palestine Liberation Organization (PLO) amid Black September. Syria conducted a short-lived incursion toward Irbid in northern Jordan, before being forced to withdraw due to heavy casualties. Syria's supposed aim was to help the Palestinian fedayeen overthrow the Hashemite monarchy.

== Background ==
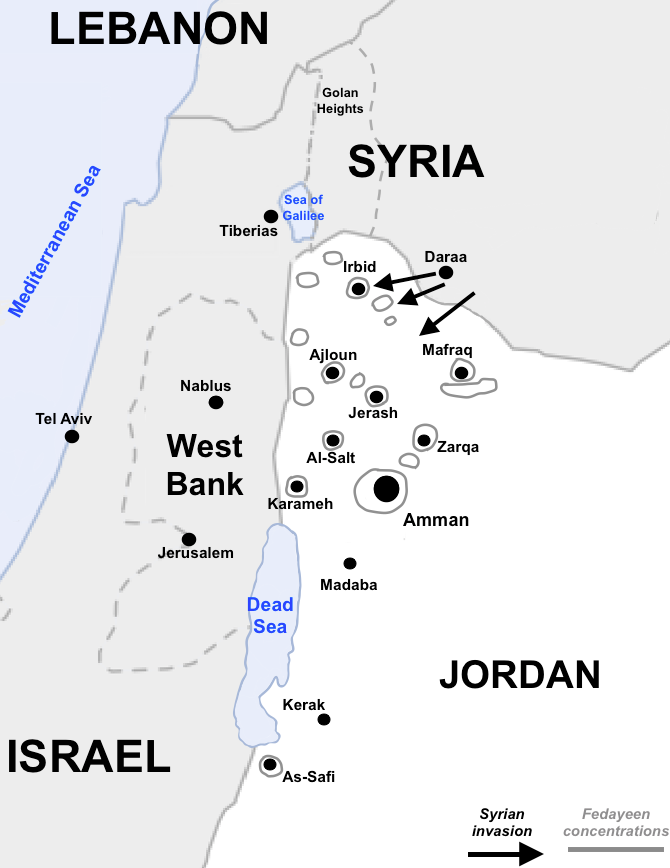
Map of Fedayeen concentrations in Jordan in 1970

On 17 September 1970, the Jordanian army surrounded several cities with a significant PLO presence and began targeting Palestinian fedayeen, viewing them as a threat to the Hashemite monarchy of King Hussein. Syria publicly threatened King Hussein, with Syrian president Nureddin al-Atassi stating that Syria would "spare no blood" to help the Palestinians. The Syrian foreign ministry warned that the "Syrian revolution cannot remain silent or idle about the massacres to which the Palestine revolution groups and the masses in Jordan are being exposed." The Syrian invasion expressed the ruling Syrian Arab Socialist Ba'ath Party's stance against "the reactionary regime" in Jordan and its desire to overthrow it. The Syrian Ba'ath Party adopted strongman Salah Jadid's policy of pushing for military intervention against Jordan on 17 September 1970.

The United States, seeing the Syrian incursion through the lens of Cold War politics, prepared to intervene on behalf of Jordan and block Soviet support for Syria.

== Invasion ==
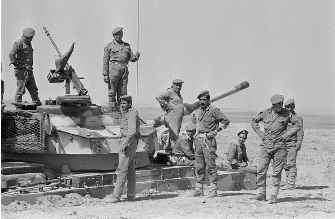
Jordanian soldiers surrounding a Centurion tank in Irbid to face off the Syrian invasion, 17 September 1970

On 18 September 1970, a force from Syria with Palestine Liberation Army markings crossed the border into Jordan, reaching Irbid and declaring it a "liberated" city. The 40th Armored Brigade managed to block the Syrian advance after heavy fighting. A second and much larger Syrian incursion took place on the same day, consisting of two armored and one mechanized infantry brigade of the 5th Infantry Division, and around 300 tanks.

On 20 September 1970, Syria committed 16,000 troops and more than 170 T-55 tanks and other armoured vehicles to invade Jordan, but declined to commit its air force. Jordanian forces managed to repel two Syrian armored offensives and inflicted heavy losses on a Syrian armored brigade. Syrian tanks crossed near Ramtha, advancing 5 miles past it, and slowly moved toward Irbid.

By the morning of 21 September, Syria had the battleground advantage, with almost 300 tanks and 60 artillery tubes near Ramtha and Irbid, some of which had already entered Irbid. Syrian forces later captured two key crossroads that served as gateways to the Jordanian capital, Amman.

By 22 September, however, the Syrian forces had been largely defeated as they attempted to breach Jordanian lines north of the Ajloun mountains. Syrian forces suffered due to Jordanian airstrikes, logistic shortfalls, and mechanical breakdowns. By midday, approximately 50 of 200 Syrian tanks became inoperable. Syrian forces began withdrawing from Jordan on the night of 22–23 September 1970.

== Casualties ==
During the invasion, Syrian tanks inflicted heavy losses on the Jordanian army. In one case, a squadron of T-55s stopped the advance of a large Jordanian column, with 19 Centurions destroyed and up to 10 Syrian T-55s lost in the battle. According to Israeli intelligence, Jordan lost 75 to 90 tanks out of 200 involved; most of these were destroyed by Syrian T-55s at ar-Ramtha. Syrian tank losses amounted to 62 T-55s (mostly breakdowns) left in Jordanian territory. Syrian losses were 150 soldiers killed or wounded and 200 captured. Jordanian losses were 537 soldiers killed and 1500 wounded.
