= 1970 Syrian coup d'etat =

1970 coup led by Hafez al-Assad

- Part of the Arab Cold War
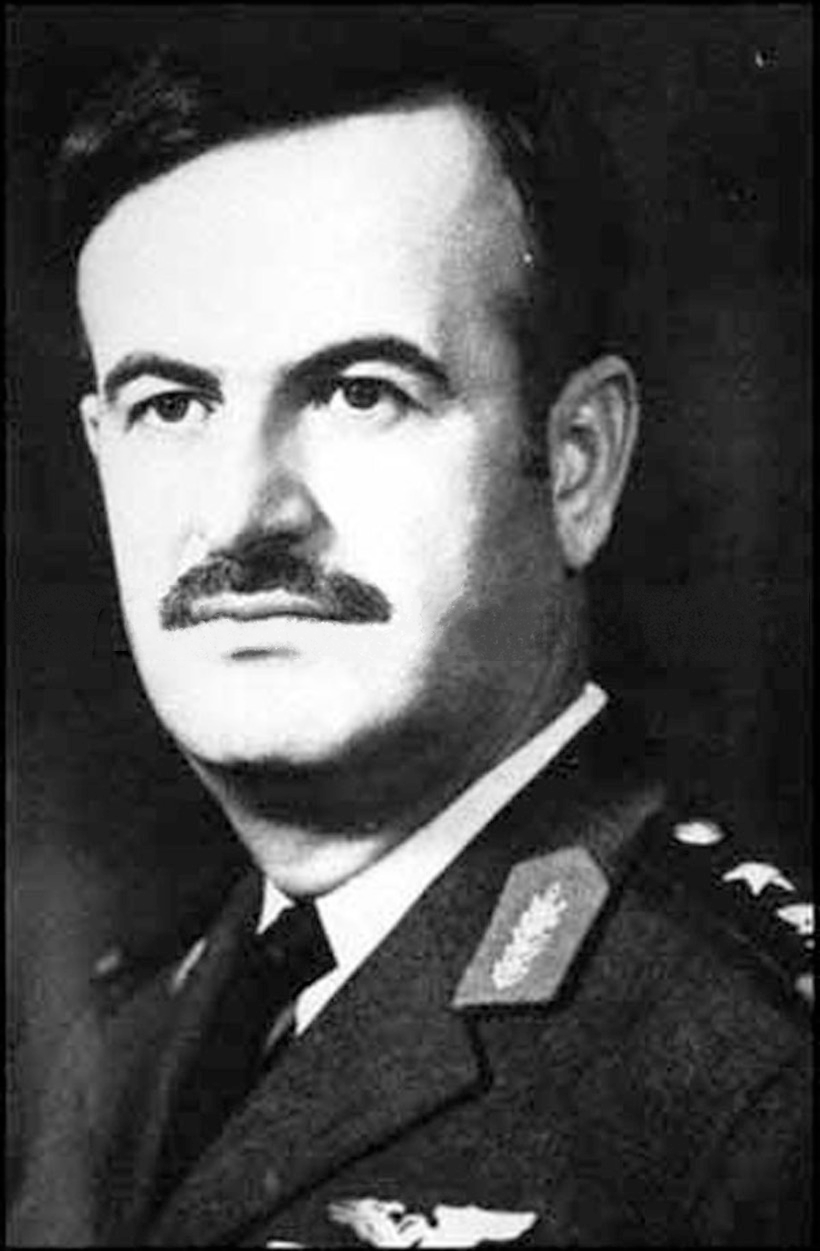
- Hafez al-Assad shortly after the success of the movement
Date	13–16 November 1970
Location	(Syria) Syrian Arab Republic
Result	Assadist victory: Overthrow of Salah Jadid and his allies; Purge of Aflaqists from the Arab Socialist Ba'ath Party – Syria Region; Beginning of the Assad family's hereditary rule and cult of personality

Belligerents
(Syria) Syrian Government: Ba'ath Party	Syrian Arab Armed Forces

Commanders and leaders
(Syria) Salah Jadid (POW) (Syria) Nureddin al-Atassi	(Syria) Hafez al-Assad (Syria) Rifaat al-Assad (Syria) Mustafa Tlass (Syria) Iskandar Salama

Casualties and losses
- No deaths
- Jadid and Assad conflict (30 October 1970–12 November 1970)

The 1970 Syrian coup d'etat, also called the Corrective Revolution (Arabic: ثورة التصحيح, romanized: Thawrat al-Tashih) or the Corrective Movement (Arabic: الحركة التصحيحية, romanized: al-Ḥarakah at-Taṣḥīḥīyya), was a bloodless military coup d'état led by General Hafez al-Assad on 13 November 1970 in Syria. Assad promised to sustain and improve the "nationalist socialist line" of the state and the Ba'ath Party. The Ba'ath party adopted an ideological revision, absolving itself of Salah Jadid's doctrine of exporting revolutions. The new doctrine placed emphasis on defeating Israel, by developing the Syrian military with the support of the Soviet Union.

Assad would rule Ba'athist Syria until his death in 2000, after which he was succeeded by his son Bashar al-Assad who in turn ruled until the collapse of his regime in December 2024.

== Events ==
Assad started planning to seize power shortly after the failed Syrian military intervention in the Black September crisis in Jordan. While Assad had been in de facto command of Syrian politics since 1969, Salah Jadid and his supporters still held all the formal trappings of power. After attending the funeral of Gamal Abdel Nasser, Assad returned to Syria to attend the Emergency National Congress held on 30 October 1970. At the congress, Assad was condemned by Jadid and his supporters, who formed the majority of the party delegates. However, before attending the congress, Assad had ordered troops loyal to him to surround the building in which the congress was held. Criticism of Assad's political position continued, but with Assad's troops surrounding the building, the majority of delegates knew that they had lost the battle. Assad and Mustafa Tlass were stripped of their government posts during the congress, although this move had little practical influence.

When the National Congress broke up on 12 November 1970, Assad ordered loyalists to arrest the leading members of Jadid's government. While many leading middle men were offered posts in Syria's embassies abroad, Jadid refused, telling Assad, "If I ever take power you will be dragged through the streets until you die." In response, Assad imprisoned Jadid, who spent the rest of his life at Mezze prison. There were no fatalities, and the country remained calm following the coup. The only proof to the outside world that something was amiss was that official dailies, radio, and, television stations either stopped publishing or were off the air. A Temporary Regional Command was established shortly after, and on 16 November 1970, the new government published its first decree. Assad was declared the winner of sham elections and was sworn in as President on 12 March 1971.

== Aftermath ==
=== 1971 Party Purges ===
Assad's faction, which was far smaller than the pro-Jadid faction, began recruiting Aflaqites to top positions to cement their power. Assad appealed directly to Michel Aflaq's sympathizers by stating: "Let us rebuild together and if we fail our heads will all be on the block together". Around 2,000 people responded to Assad's invitation; among them were Georges Saddiqni, a party ideologist, and Shakir al-Fahham, one of the secretaries of the Ba'ath Party's founding congress in 1947.

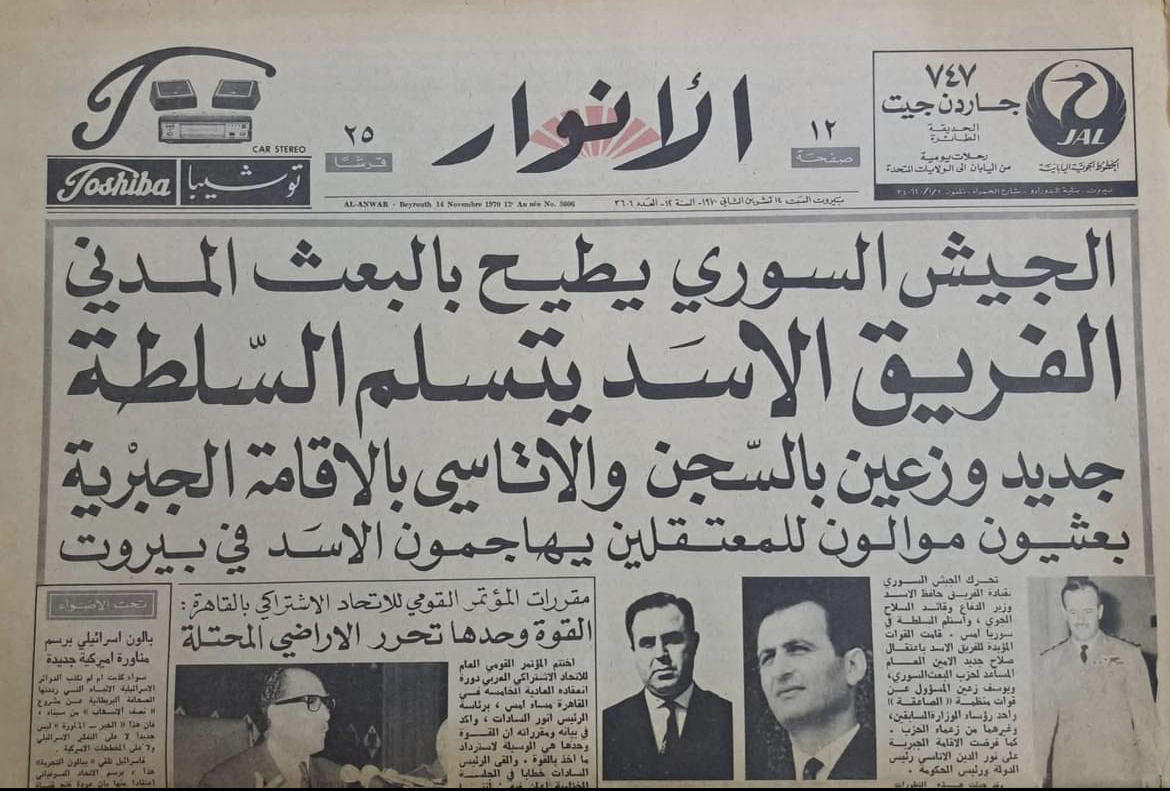
Newspaper announces another military coup, 1970

However, despite trying to strengthen his hold on the party, at a 1970 Regional Command meeting, its members opposed Assad's motion to appoint a figurehead to lead the party. As a result, Assad went on to establish a separate power base apart from the party. Suspecting sympathisers of the Old Guard as a threat to his power, Hafez al-Assad carried out a purge in 1971, rounding up hundreds of party members and conducted a showtrial against Michel Aflaq, former Syrian President Amin al-Hafiz and numerous Baathists. Aflaq, Amin and three Baath leaders were sentenced to death via absentia, while ninety-nine party members were imprisoned on accusations of collaboration with the Iraqi Ba'ath. Leaders of the Old Guard like Aflaq and Amin al-Hafiz had found refuge in Baghdad, following the 1968 Baathist seizure of power in Iraq. The purges erased all remaining influence of Aflaqists within the Syrian Baath party.

=== Domestic Policies ===
==== Political reforms ====
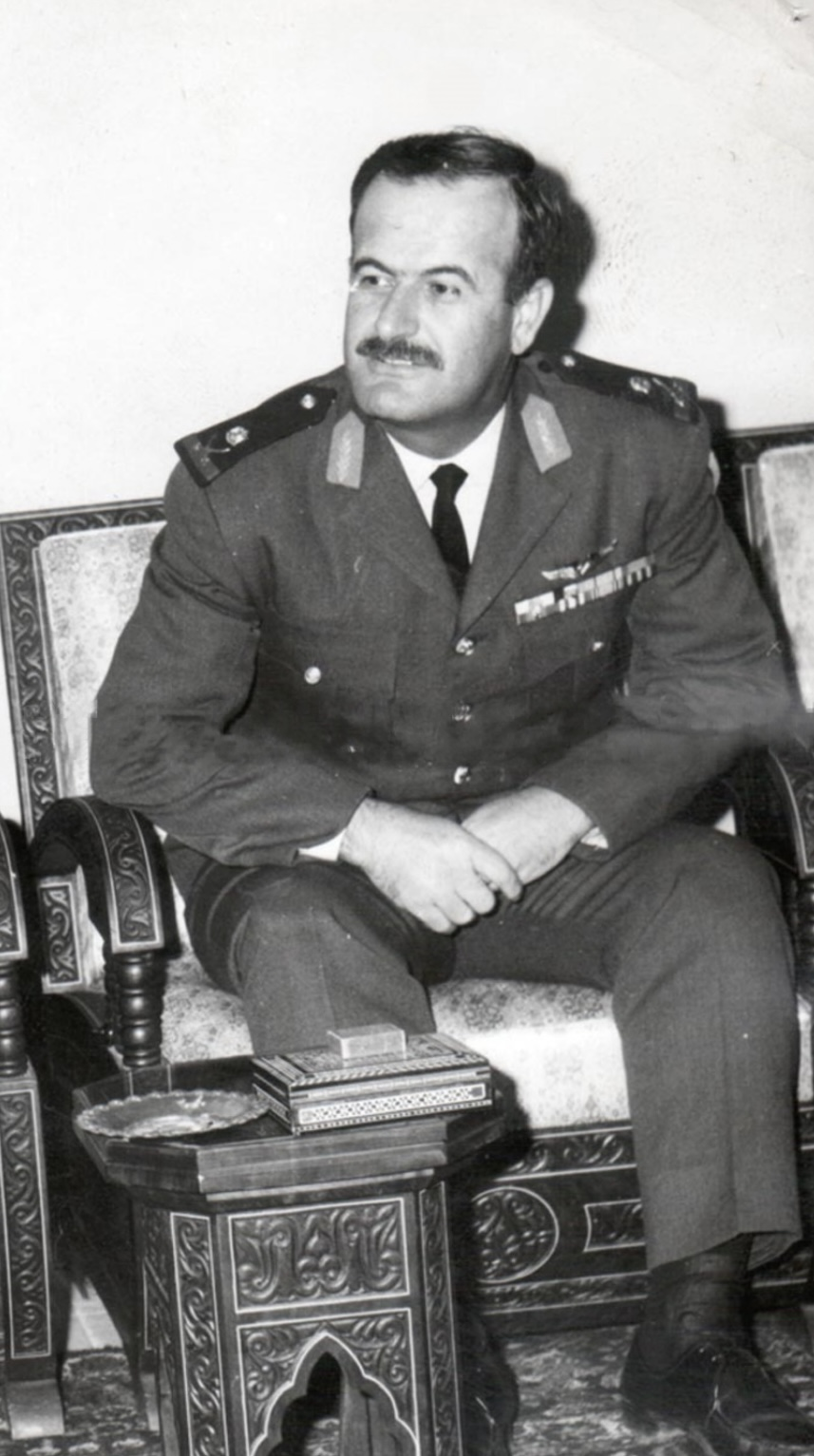
Hafez Assad in November of 1970.

As part of his "corrective movement," at the 11th National Congress Assad introduced a general revision of national policy. Included in these revisions were measures introduced to consolidate his rule. His Ba'athist predecessors had restricted control of Islam in public life and government. Because the Constitution allowed only Muslims to become president, Assad, unlike Jadid, presented himself as a pious Muslim. In order to gain support from the ulamah—the Islamic scholarship — he prayed in Sunni mosques, even though he was an Alawite. Among the measures Assad introduced were the raising in rank of some 2,000 religious functionaries, and the appointment of an alim as minister of religious functionaries and construction of mosques. He appointed a little-known Sunni teacher, Ahmad al-Khatib, as Head of State in order to satisfy the Sunni majority. Assad also appointed Sunnis to senior positions in the government, the military, and the party. All of his prime ministers, defense ministers, and foreign ministers, a majority of his cabinet, were Sunnis. In the early 1970s, Assad was verified as an authentic Muslim by the Sunni Mufti of Damascus and made the Hajj—the pilgrimage to Mecca. In his speeches, he often used terms such as "jihad" (struggle) and "shahada" (martyrdom) when referring to fighting Israel.

The coup turned Syria's social and political structures upside down. The Alawites, Assad's sect, although no more than 12% of the population, came to occupy coveted positions in every sector of life in Syria. Many rural Alawites supported the expansion of state institutions and military over the private sector mostly composed of Sunni-led bourgeousie as a means to enhance their privileges in the public sector. Popular dissatisfaction over Alawite dominace became one of the most significant sources of the Ba’athist regime's legitimacy crisis in Syria.

==== Economic reforms ====
Assad reversed his predecessor's policy of radical economic socialism, and strengthened the private sector's role in the economy. In many ways the Corrective Movement resulted in a tacit alliance between the political elite and the Damascene bourgeoisie, of whom the latter had previously provided the primary base of support for the National Party of Syria prior to the Ba'ath Party's seizure of power in 1963.

=== Foreign policy ===
The crux of the new foreign policy adopted by Hafez al-Assad was based on strengthening relations with U.S.S.R, in order to develop Syrian military and economy. The reforms also sought to normalize Syria's relations with the other Arab states since it had been isolated diplomatically during Jadid's short-lived rule. Assad tried to establish working relations with Egypt and Saudi Arabia in order to establish the so-called "Cairo–Damascus–Riyadh axis" to strengthen security cooperation against Israel. The cooperation agreement was effective, and when Egypt and Syria failed to win the October War in 1973, Saudi Arabia and other Arab oil producers ceased selling oil to the West.

== Legacy ==
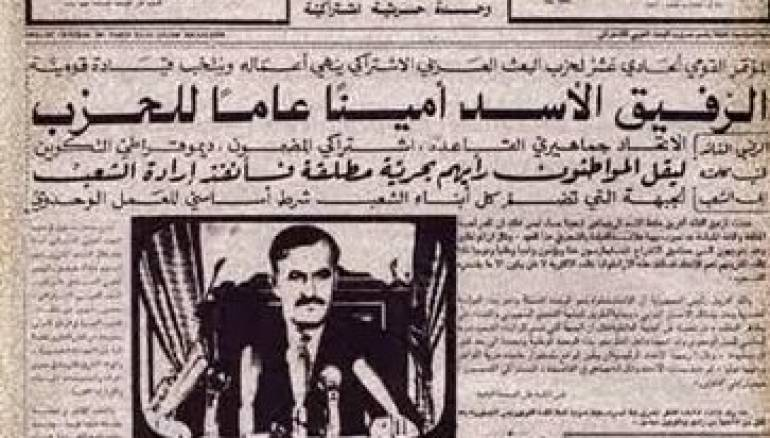
Newspaper article announcing Assad's inauguration as president, 1971

The policies implemented by Hafez al-Assad following his consolidation of power significantly transformed the Baath party and state. Syria's 1973 constitution re-inforced the "leading role" of the Ba'ath Party in the society and transformed the neo-Baathist revolutionary state into a personalist "Presidential Monarchy" which concentrated all power under the Syrian President. After attaining undisputed jurisdiction in the military, party and bureaucracy; Assad strengthened his grip by assigning cadres of Alawite loyalists to key posts of various state institutions. Members of Assad family became influential in various sectors of the economy, business community and Ba'athist military.

When the communist governments in the Eastern Bloc collapsed, an ideological crisis within the government arose. However, Assad and his supporters hit back, stating that because of the "Corrective Movement under the leadership of the warrior Hafez al-Assad", the principles of economic and political pluralism, which had been introduced "some two decades" beforehand, safeguarded the Syrian government from the possibility of collapse.

Later, on 27 January 2000, Syrian foreign minister Farouk al-Sharaa stated, "I am not exaggerating when I say that the Corrective Movement, which took place in 1970 under the leadership of Hafez al-Assad ... has crystallized for the first time in modern Arab history a mature and realistic pan-Arab ideology." The day of the Corrective Movement was one of the main public holidays in Ba'athist Syria.

== See also ==
- 1966 Syrian coup d'état – 1966 neo-Ba'athist military coup in Syria
- Corrective Move – 1969 Marxist internal coup in South Yemen
- Corrective revolution (Egypt) – Reform introduced by Anwar Sadat in Egypt
- June 13 Corrective Movement – 1974 coup in the Yemen Arab Republic
- Ramadan Revolution – 1963 Ba'athist military coup in Iraq

== Bibliography ==
- Alianak, Sonia (2007). Middle Eastern Leaders and Islam: A Precarious Equilibrium. Studies in international relations. New York: Peter Lang. ISBN 978-0-8204-6924-9. OCLC 137244736.
- Korany, Bahgat; Dessouki, Ali E. Hillal, eds. (2010). The Foreign Policies of Arab States: The Challenge of Globalization. An AUC Forum for International Affairs edition. Cairo; New York: American University in Cairo Press. ISBN 978-977-416-360-9.
- Freedman, Robert Owen (1993). Freedman, Robert Owen (ed.). The Middle East After Iraq's Invasion of Kuwait. Gainesville: University of Florida Press. ISBN 978-0-8130-1214-8.
- Freedman, Robert Owen, ed. (2002). The Middle East Enters the Twenty-first Century. Gainesville, FL: University Press of Florida. ISBN 978-0-8130-3110-1.
- Hinnebusch, Raymond A. (2001). Syria: Revolution from Above. The Contemporary Middle East. London; New York: Routledge. ISBN 978-0-415-28568-1. OCLC 53294884.
- Lefèvre, Raphaël (2013). Ashes of Hama: The Muslim Brotherhood in Syria. Oxford: Oxford University Press. ISBN 978-0-19-936533-3.
- Seale, Patrick; McConville, Maureen (1990). Asad of Syria: The Struggle for the Middle East. Berkeley, Calif.: University of California Press. ISBN 978-0-520-06976-3.
- Reich, Bernard, ed. (1990). Political Leaders of the Contemporary Middle East and North Africa: A Biographical Dictionary. New York: Greenwood Press. ISBN 978-0-313-26213-5.
- Zisser, Eyal (2001). Asad's Legacy: Syria in Transition. London: C. Hurst & Co. ISBN 978-1-85065-450-6.
