= Salah Jadid =

Syrian military officer and politician (1926–1993)

- صلاح جديد
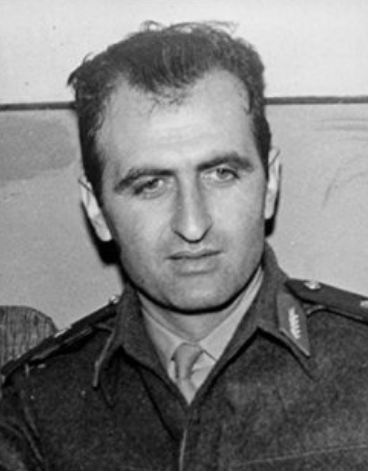
- Jadid in 1968

Assistant Regional Secretary of the Syrian Regional Branch
- In office 1 August 1965 – 13 November 1970
- Regional Secretary: Amin al-Hafiz; Nureddin al-Atassi
- Preceded by: Muhammad az-Zubi
- Succeeded by: Jaber Bajbouj

Chief of General Staff of the Syrian Arab Armed Forces
- In office 11 November 1963 – 1966
- Preceded by: Ziad al-Hariri
- Succeeded by: Ahmed Suidani

Member of the Regional Command of the Syrian Regional Branch
- In office March 1966 – 13 November 1970
- In office 1 February 1964 – 19 December 1965

Personal details
- Born: 1926 Dweir Baabda, Alawite State, French Syria
- Died: 19 August 1993 (aged 66–67) Mezzeh prison, Damascus, Syria
- Party: Arab Socialist Ba'ath Party
- Other political affiliations: Ba'ath Party (1947–1966); Syrian Social Nationalist Party

Military service
- Allegiance: First Syrian Republic (1946–1950); Second Syrian Republic (1950–1958; 1961—1963); United Arab Republic (1958–1961); Ba'athist Syria (1963–1970)
- Branch/service: Syrian Arab Army
- Years of service: 1946–1970
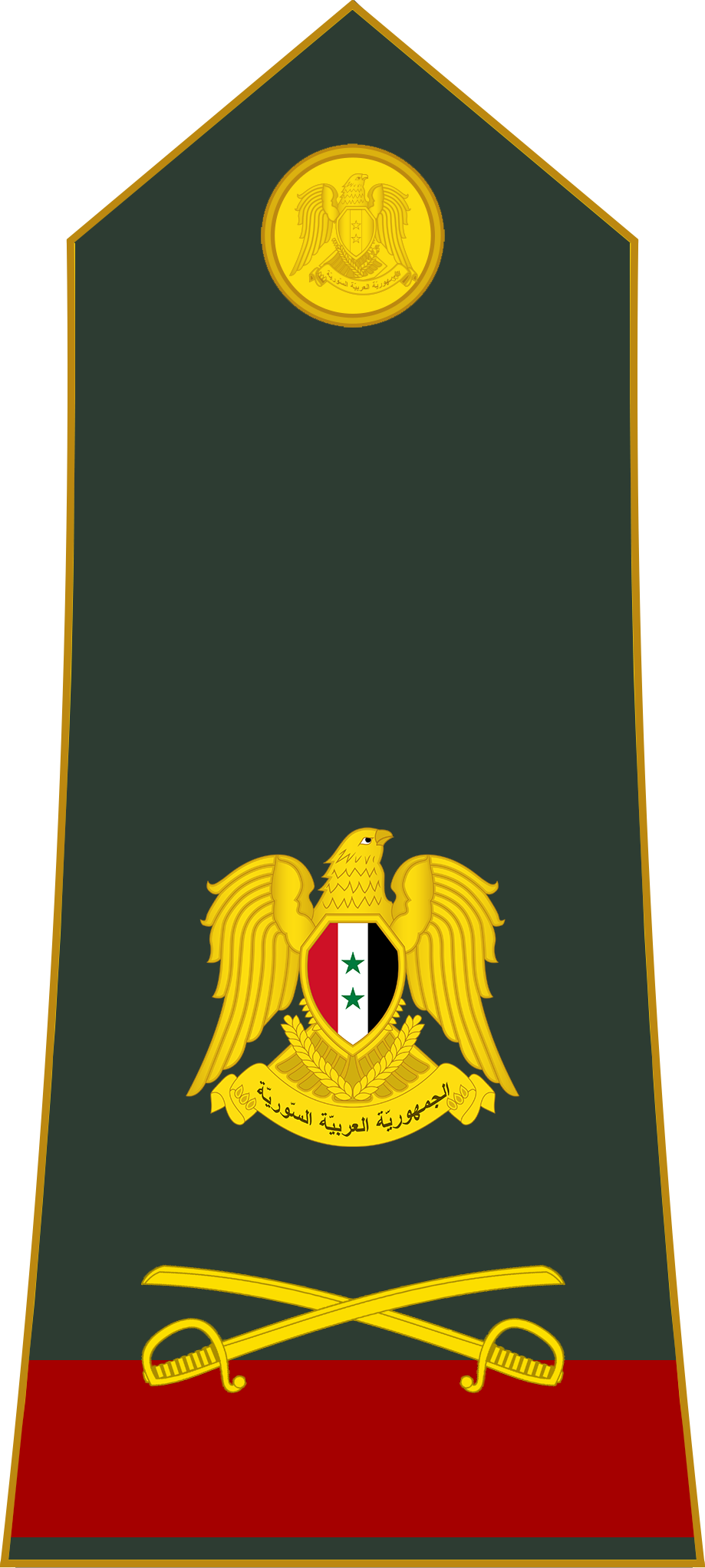
- Rank: Major General
- Battles/wars: 1948 Arab–Israeli War; Six-Day War; War of Attrition; Black September

Salah Jadid (Arabic: صلاح جديد, romanized: Ṣalāḥ Jadīd; 1926 – 19 August 1993) was a Syrian military officer and politician who served as the de facto leader of Syria from 1966 to 1970. The leader of the far-left bloc of the Syrian Ba'ath Party, he was ousted in 1970 by Hafez al-Assad's Corrective Revolution.

Jadid came to power after a coup in 1966. Although he did not rule directly, preferring to remain in the shadows, he wielded all real power in Syria through his allies in key positions of power. Salah Jadid had an open passion for Qutriyun (Regionalist Ba'athism), communism and the Soviet model of government: In just four years in power, he built a totalitarian neo-Ba’athist regime, sometimes called "neo-Marxist". His imposition of radical socialist ideology, brutal repression, and anti-religious policies alienated almost all sectors of Syrian society. His foreign policy alienated most of Syria's potential allies in the Arab world and contributed to the start of the Six-Day War. Salah Jadid was overthrown by his former colleague Hafez al-Assad in 1970 in the so-called "Corrective Revolution".

== Early life ==
Jadid was born in 1926 in the village of Dweir Baabda, near the coastal city of Jableh, to an Alawite family of the Haddadin tribe. Another report states his birth year as 1924. He studied at the Homs Military Academy, and entered the Syrian Army in 1946. His brothers, Lieutenant Ghassan and Fouad, volunteered to fight in Palestine. There, Ghassan fought in the Battle of Al-Zira'a (a Jewish settlement) in February 1948, as well as the Battle of Mishmar HaEmek. Fouad had preceded Ghassan to Palestine, where he joined Adib Shishakli's detachment.

Jadid was originally a member of the Syrian Social Nationalist Party (SSNP), but later became a member of the Arab Socialist Ba'ath Party, led by Michel Aflaq and Salah al-Din al-Bitar, in the 1950s through an associate of Akram al-Hawrani. Even so, Jadid remained close to the SSNP; his brother, Ghassan, was one of its most prominent members in Syria. He changed allegiance again in the 1950s, when he became a member of the Arab Nationalist Movement, a party supporting Gamal Abdel Nasser's ideological beliefs. Jadid supported Syria's ascension into the United Arab Republic (UAR), a union republic consisting of Egypt and Syria.

== Pre-Ba'athist career ==
=== UAR period ===
During the UAR-era, Jadid was stationed in Cairo, Egypt. Jadid established the Military Committee alongside other Ba'athists in 1959. The chief aim of the Military Committee was to protect the UAR's existence. In the beginning there were only four members of the Military Committee, the others were Hafez al-Assad, Abd al-Karim al-Jundi and Muhammad Umran. The Military Committee also tried to save the Syrian Ba'ath movement from annihilation. Committee members were among those who blamed Aflaq for the Ba'ath Party's failing during the UAR years. The party's Third National Congress in 1959 supported Aflaq's decision to dissolve the party, but a 1960 National Congress, in which Jadid was a delegate representing the then-unknown Military Committee, reversed the decision and called for the Ba'ath Party's reestablishment. The Congress also decided to improve relations with Nasser by democratising the UAR from within. There was also a faction within the Ba’ath party (led by Akram al-Hawrani) that called for the separation of Syria from Egypt.

=== Post-UAR period ===
The Military Committee did not succeed in its aims, and in September 1961 the UAR was dissolved after the coup d'etat. President Nazim al-Qudsi, who led the first post-UAR government, persecuted Jadid and the others for their Nasserite loyalties, and all of them were forced to retire from the Syrian Army. Following the 1961 coup that ended the UAR, the Committee started planning its own coup against the secessionist government of al-Qudsi.

== Ba'athist coup d'etat ==
In March 1963, Ba'athist Military Committee staged a coup against the democratically elected president Nazim al-Qudsi, beginning 62 years of uninterrupted totalitarian Ba'athist rule in Syria. In that coup, Jadid bicycled into the city that morning, and captured the Bureau of Officers' Affairs. The Ba'athist Military Committee, which had seized power prior, declared martial law and formed the National Council for the Revolutionary Command (NCRC) to rule Syria, which included Jadid as well as non-Ba'athists (such as the Nasserists). However, within the NCRC, the Military Committee, which consisted only of Ba'athists, still remained and held all the real power in the country (which included Jadid, along with Hafez al-Assad, Abdul-Karim Jundi and Ahmad Miration), which became known as the "junta within the junta". Soon, in the same year, Jadid was promoted from lieutenant colonel to major general and named Chief of Staff of the Armed Forces of Syria.

=== Ba'athist consolidation of power ===
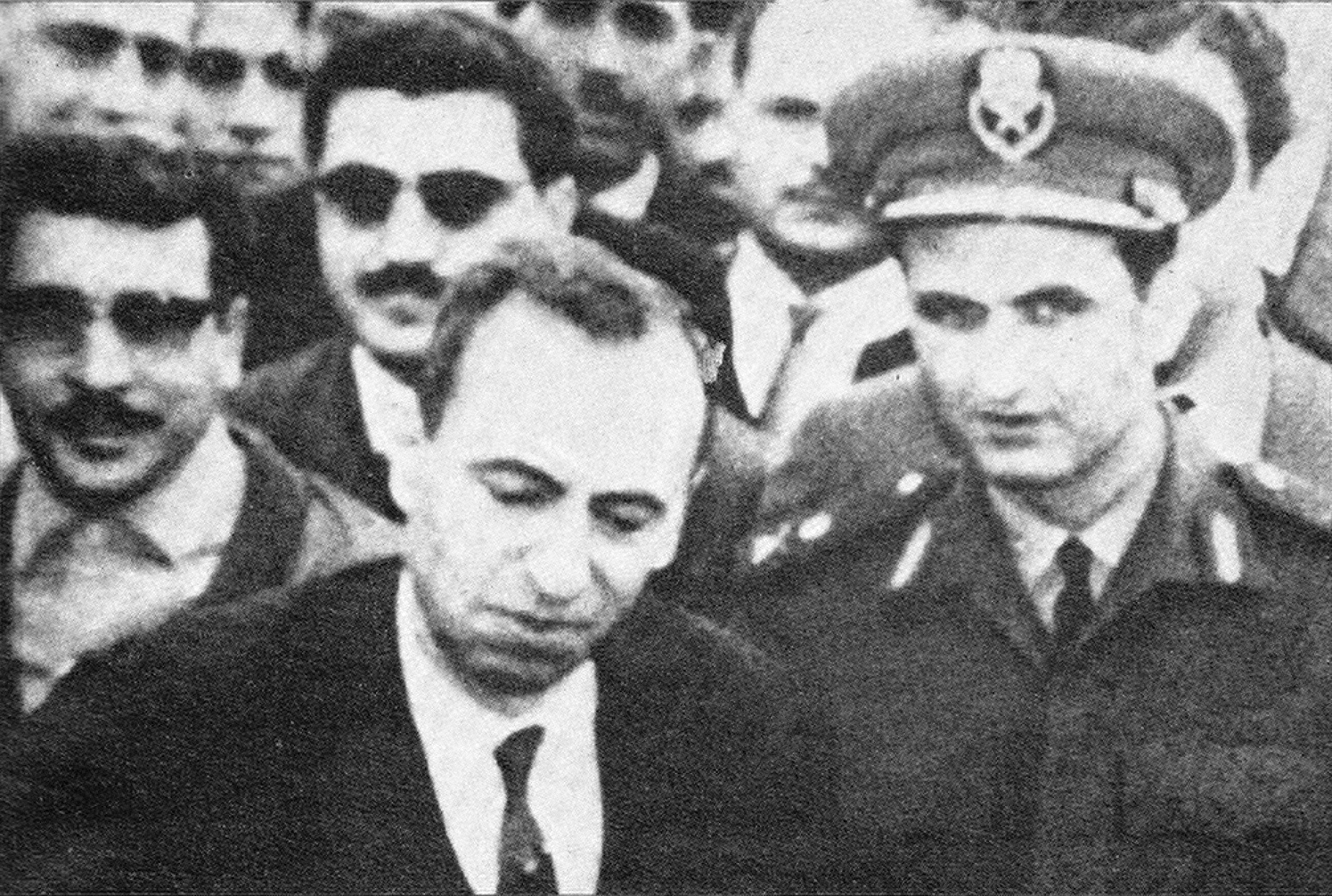
Michel Aflaq (left) and Jadid.

Ba'athists took control over all aspects country's of citizen's life: politics, education, culture, religion and surveilled all aspects of civil society through its powerful Mukhabarat (secret police). Ba'athist military officers began initiating purges across Syria as part of the imposition of their ideological programme. Politicians of the Second Syrian Republic who had supported the separation from United Arab Republic (UAR) were purged and liquidated by the Ba'athists: this was in addition to purging of the Syrian military and its subordination to the Ba'ath party. Politicians, military officers and civilians who supported Syria's secession from UAR were also stripped of their social and legal rights, thereby enabling the Ba'athist regime to dismantle the entire political class of the Second Syrian Republic and eliminate its institutions. The Syrian Arab Armed forces and secret police were integrated with the Ba'ath party apparatus; after the purging of traditional civilian and military elites by the new regime. Following the seizure of power in 1963 by the Ba'athist military committee, the Syrian regional branch of the Ba'ath party experienced severe factionalism and splintering, leading to a succession of governments and new constitutions. The influence and power of neo-Ba'athists grew: Neo-Ba'athism was a more radical version of Ba'athism, and Salah Jadid was one of the main Neo-Ba'athists in Syria. Accordint to the Ben-Tzur's “The Neo-Ba’th Party in Syria” journal, The neo-Ba'athist military officers, through their increased political and military influence, began initiating purges across Syrian state political structures and rapidly consolidated control over various organs of the Syrian Ba'ath party. All decisions about the relations between the military and civilian sectors (as well as the fact that a new set of rules had been established for the party organization in the armed forces), were classified as top secret.

=== Jadid's rising influence ===
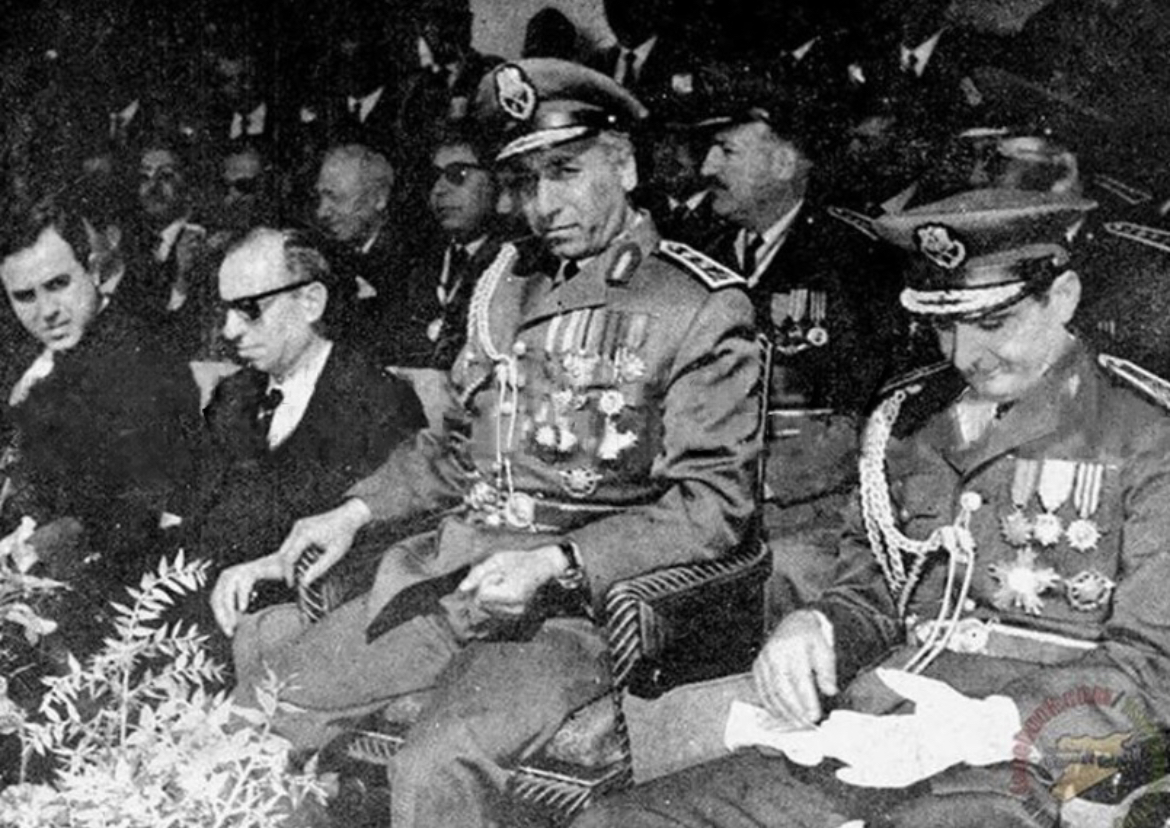
Members of the Syrian government in 1965. From left to the right: Vice president Nureddin al-Atassi, leader of National Command Michel Aflaq, president Amin al-Hafiz and Army's Chief of Staff, Salah Jadid.

In the first two years each member of the Military Committee gathered around him a group of supporters from among the officers, using personal ties and military authority. General Salah Jadid, the Chief of Staff, had the biggest opportunities, and later came to represent the most radical army group. By September 1965, 40 percent of the delegates were military officers, and the full control over the civilian organization passed into the hands of the strongman from the Military Committee, Jadid, who proceeded to increase its efficiency by military methods. The army's connection with the Ba'ath Party increased greatly, where ideas of military discipline and other aspects of the military were introduced.

=== Muslim Brotherhood riot ===
In April 1964, a Muslim Brotherhood uprising broke out in Hama against the ruling Ba'ath Party. The decision to suppress the Hama riot led to a schism in the Military Committee between Muhammad Umran and Jadid. Umran opposed force, instead wanting the Ba'ath Party to create a coalition with other pan-Arab forces. Jadid desired a strong one-party state, similar to those in the communist countries of Europe, also viewing it as a necessary means to protect Ba'athist power against "class enemies." The uprising was eventually suppressed by military force, and the following month the NCRC implemented a provisional constitution providing for a National Council of the Revolution (NCR), a cabinet, a presidential council, and an appointed legislature composed of "people's organizations."

== Seizure of power ==
=== 1966 Coup ===
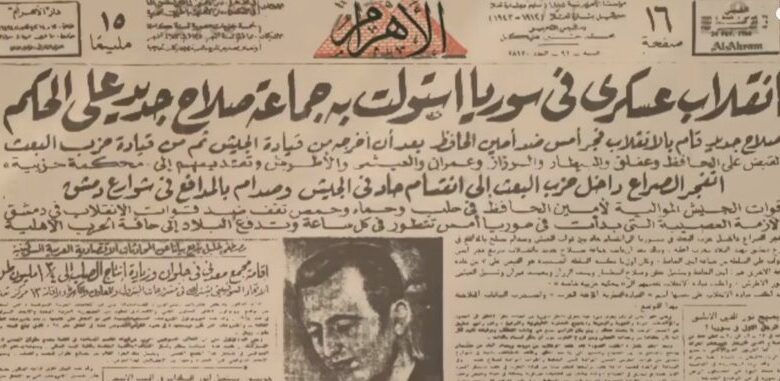
Reports of the military coup in the Al-Ahram an Egyptian newspaper. The article contains a photograph of Jadid.

Salah Jadid came to power after a military coup in 1966, in which he was a leading figure. The coup was due to strong ideological differences between the Military Committee and the National Command of the Ba'ath Party, whose unity had almost collapsed shortly after the seizure of power in 1963. A new coup overthrew the National Command and ousted the Aflaqites from power (and sent Michel Aflaq into exile). The new regime entrenched itself with the help of massive military, economic, and political aid from the Soviet Union, while exploiting differences within the communist camp and in the Soviet leadership itself. The instigators of the coup are also sometimes described as a military junta. 1966 coup marked the total ideological transformation of the Ba'ath party's Syrian regional branch into a militarist "neo-Ba'athist" organization which became independent of the National Command of the original Ba'ath party.

=== Rift of the Ba'athism ===
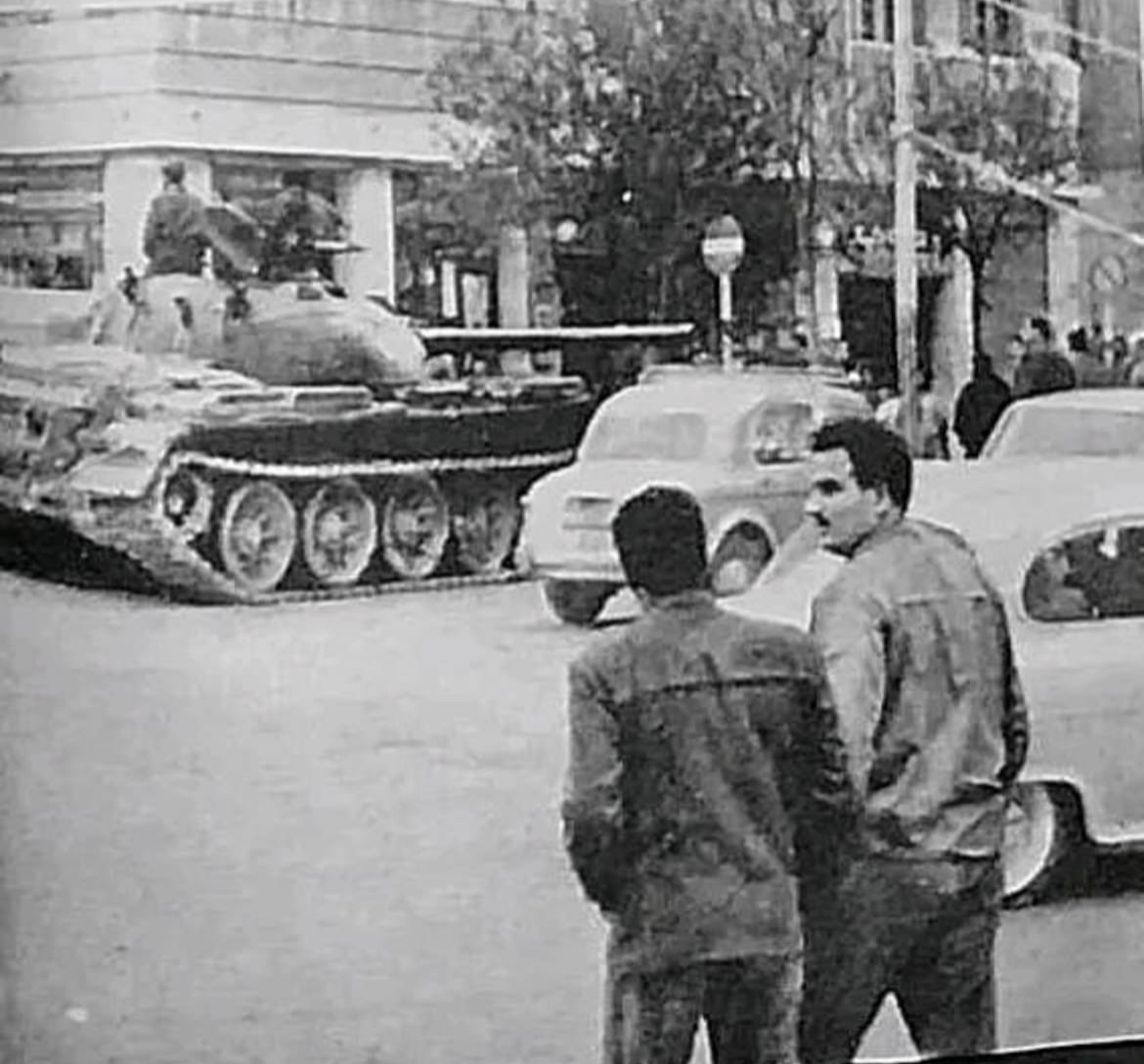
Syrian army tank on the streets during the 1966 military coup

Jadid's coup also caused the deepest rift in the history of the Ba'ath movement: when the National Command was toppled, the Iraqi Regional Branch of the Ba'ath party remained supportive of what it viewed as the "legitimate leadership" of Michel Aflaq. When the Iraqi Ba'ath party gained power in 1968 in the 17 July Revolution no attempts were made at a merger, to achieve their supposed goal of Arab unity, or reconciliation with the Syrian Ba'ath. After the establishment of Ba'ath rule in Iraq, many members of the Syrian-dominated Ba'ath movement defected to its Iraqi-counterpart, few if any Iraqi-loyal Ba'athists attempted to change its allegiance to Damascus. From the beginning, the neo-Ba'athist regime in Damascus launched an overwhelmingly anti-Iraqi Ba'athist propaganda campaign, to which their counterparts in Baghdad responded. The Syrian Ba'ath party denounced Aflaq as a "thief" and claimed that he had stolen the Ba'athist ideology from Zaki al-Arsuzi and proclaimed it as his own. The Iraqi Regional Branch, however, still proclaimed Aflaq as the founder of Ba'athism. Bitar was sentenced to death "in absentia" in 1969, and Aflaq was condemned to death in absentia in 1971. The Syrian Regional Branch also erected a statue of Arsuzi soon after the 1966 coup. Nevertheless, the majority of Ba'athists outside Syria continued to view Aflaq, not Arsuzi, as the principal founder of Ba'athism.

== Leadership of Syria ==
Jadid's regime was the most radical in Syrian history. Whilst Jadid remained away from public view, as the second secretary of the Ba'ath Party, men allied to him filled the top posts in state and army: Nureddin al-Atassi, as party chairman, state president and later prime minister; Yusuf Zuayyin, as prime minister; Ibrahim Makhous as foreign minister, Hafez al-Assad as defense minister; Abd al-Karim al-Jundi, as security chief. A number of ex-army officers now also held key positions; most of them belonged to a clandestine group called "Military Convention" which undermined the position of civil authority within the Ba'ath party. Among those officers were Hafez al-Assad, Ahmad al-Suwaydani, Mustafa Tlass and Salah Jadid himself. The Syrian Communist Party played a very important role in Jadid's government, with some communists holding political posts, and Jadid established close and strong ties with the Communist Party of the Soviet Union.

Contrary to traditional Ba'athist philosophy, neo-Ba'athists believed that the army should be an independent entity having a central position in the political area, and they also insisted that the army play a role equal to that of the civilian sector in the activities of the Ba'ath Party. Jadid and his ideologists also argued that in order for the army to properly carry out its tasks, it was necessary to strengthen political propaganda within its ranks.

The Military Committee, which had been the officers' key decision-making process during 1963–66, lost its central institutional authority under Jadid because the fight against the Aflaqites was over – the key reason for the committee's existence in the first place, and NCRC was dissolved, along with the Committee, but mostly the same officers was in power. The new government supported a much more radical economic program including state ownership over industry and foreign trade, while at the same time trying to restructure agrarian relations and production.

=== 1 April announcement ===
On 1 April 1966, the new regime issued a 24-page statement outlining its ideology and policies in future.

According to Joseph Mann's "Syria, Precipitator of the Six Day War" book, the document began "by attacking the old right-wing policies of the previous regime, which have "caused degeneration and alienated Ba'athism from the Syrian people." The document called for the rejection of any ideology within the army, blaming it for weakening the army and causing a lack of motivation to tackle the various challenges it faced. The party declared that its policy towards the Arab world would henceforth be based on the idea of Arab unity and a concerted effort to resolve the Palestinian issue. The new regime claimed that the Arab monarchies had capitulated to Western dictates and interests that were not Arab. To a large extent, the document revealed the revolutionary, uncompromising nature of the new regime, strongly opposing the indecisive policies of other Arab states.”

=== Counter-coup attempt ===
Salim Hatum, who helped Jadid come to power and commanded the coup operations, was disappointed in him and attempted a counter-coup, but it failed: Hatum fled to Jordan, and when he returned to Syria after the Six-Day War in 1967, he was immediately captured and executed by the neo-Ba'athist regime. In the aftermath of the attempted coup Jadid purged the party's military organization, removing 89 officers; Minister of Defence, Hafez Assad, removed an estimated 400 officers. The purges, which began when the Ba'ath Party took power in 1963, had left the military weak. In early 1967 there was another Ba'athist purge of officers, in which about a third were replaced by loyal but inexperienced cadets. The so-called Workers' Battalions, formed under the clear ideological influence of the Chinese Red Guards, participated in suppressing the Hatum's coup attempt (most sources mention this militia as being formed by Salah Jadid or with his strong support).

=== Internal repressions ===
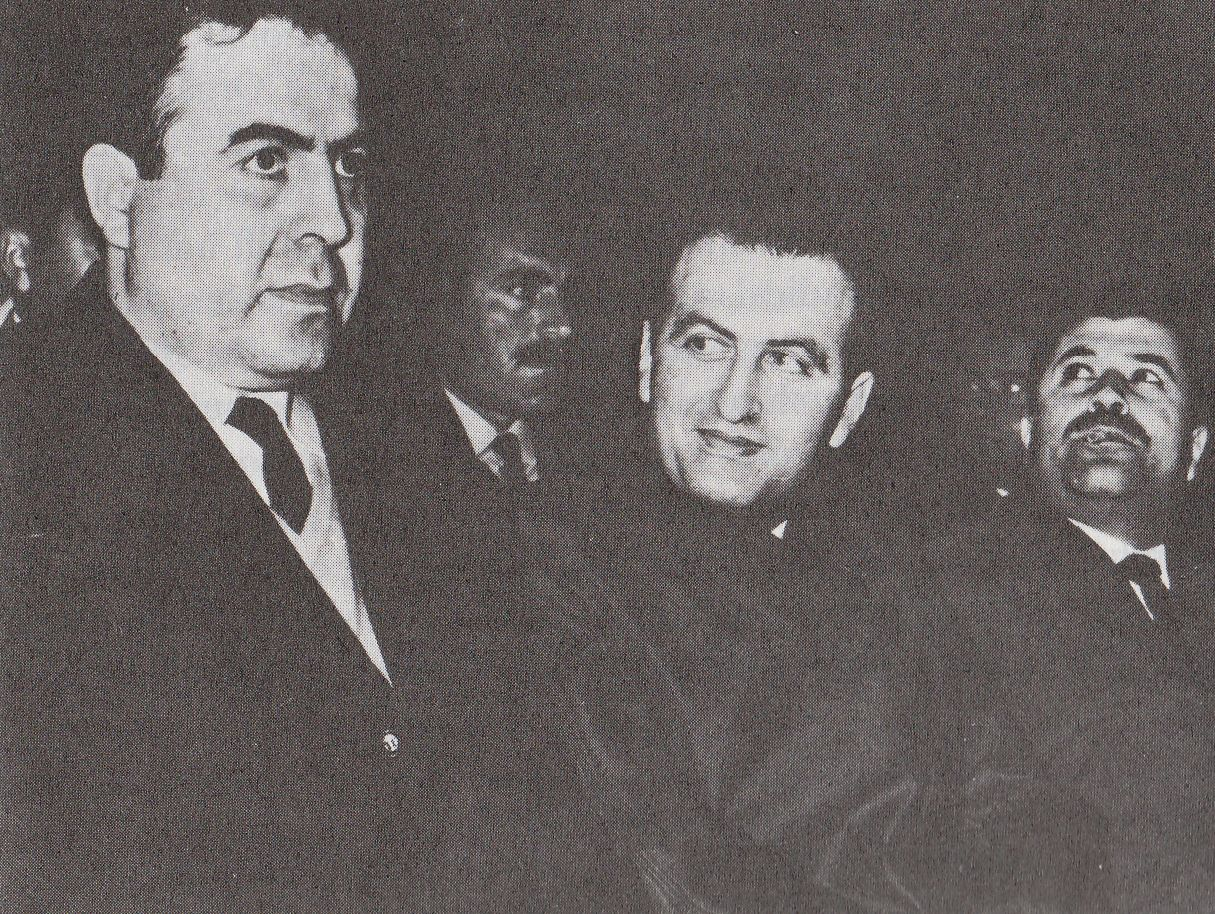
President Nureddin al-Atassi (left) and Jadid

Jadid began his rule by re-organizing all the intelligence agencies under the central command of the Ba'ath Party's National Security Bureau. Jadid appointed his ally, al-Jundi, to head the National Security Bureau, which became known as the most intimidating apparatus in the country. The Bureau, under al-Jundi, acquired a notorious reputation in the country for its brutal methods of rooting out opponents, including arbitrary arrests, torture and infiltrating civil society with state informers. Opponents of the government were harshly suppressed by Jadid's special services and Mukhabarat, while the Ba'ath Party replaced parliament as law-making body and other parties were banned. The Jadid regime attempted to carry out Arabization campaigns in the predominantly Kurdish northeastern regions.

Khaled Hakim, an anti-military leftist and prominent Ba'ath trade unionist, described how at regime marches, workers with guns were in fact army soldiers dressed in workers' overalls to show public support for Jadid. He was jailed the same year Jadid staged his coup, 1966, however, he managed to escape to Jordan. In May 1967, mass demonstrations swept across Syria, showing the discontent of Syrian citizens with the anti-religious and uncompromising policies of the Jadid regime. The demonstrations ended in bloody clashes and were suppressed by security forces.

=== Imposition of radical socialism ===
The Jadid regime adopted a Marxist program of rapid economic development. Jadid and his supporters prioritised socialism and the "internal revolution", promoted the idea of class struggle and attempted a socialist transformation of Syrian society at a forced pace, creating unrest and economic difficulties. By the 1966, government-sponsored land reform and nationalization of major industries and foreign investments had confirmed the new socialist direction of Syria's economic policy. As the state assumed greater control over economic decision-making by adopting centralized planning and strictly regulating commercial transactions, Syria experienced a substantial loss of skilled workers, administrators, and their capital. On 16 May 1966, the Jadid's government issued the Economic Sanctions Law, which punished people with imprisonment for a wide range of crimes: negligence at work, damaging factory equipment, failure to implement government-imposed economic plans, leaving the country without special permission, failure to return students studying at government expense, and the export of monetary assets abroad.

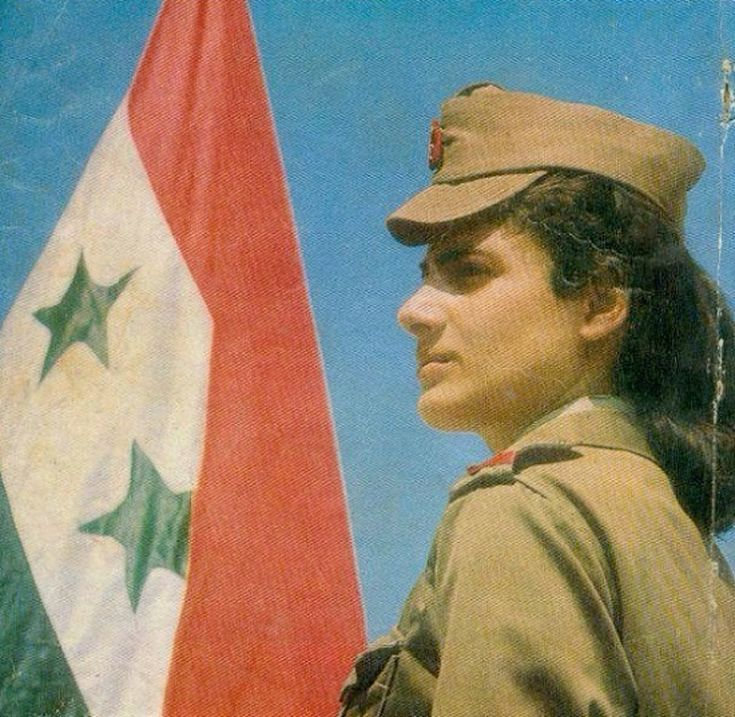
An image of a Syrian woman in military uniform, serving in the army, on the cover of a Kuwaiti magazine.

The properties of traders, local businessmen and land owners were confiscated by Jadid's radical leftist regime, while the Syrian military forces became thoroughly politicized with neo-Ba'athist officers. The Alawite officers, themselves of peasant background, claimed to represent the interests of the peasants and workers, and actively pursued policies which benefitted the rural areas at the expense of the cities. However, Jadid's swift and harsh imposition of such radical measures was extremely unpopular inside the country.

The Ba'ath Party was divided over several issues, such as how the government could best use Syria's limited resources, the ideal relationship between the party and the people, the organization of the party and whether the class struggle should end. These subjects were discussed heatedly in Ba'ath Party conclaves, and when they reached the Fourth Regional Congress the two sides were irreconcilable. To generalize, Salah Jadid's reign was characterized by extremely brutal repressions, state terror, intensification of totalitarian measures, and imposition of hardline policies of War Leninism.

The Syrian public, organized into social organizations, associations and movements, were supposed to help the regime implement its policies. The original Ba'athist leaders believed that multiple parties were not necessary for democracy and that there was a better way to do it, and the neo-Ba'athists even more so.

The Neo-Ba'athist doctrine stated that any Syrian public organization or army must be subordinate to the ruling party (i.e. the Ba'ath Party). These measures helped Jadid to centralize and strengthen his power.

=== Anti-religious policies ===
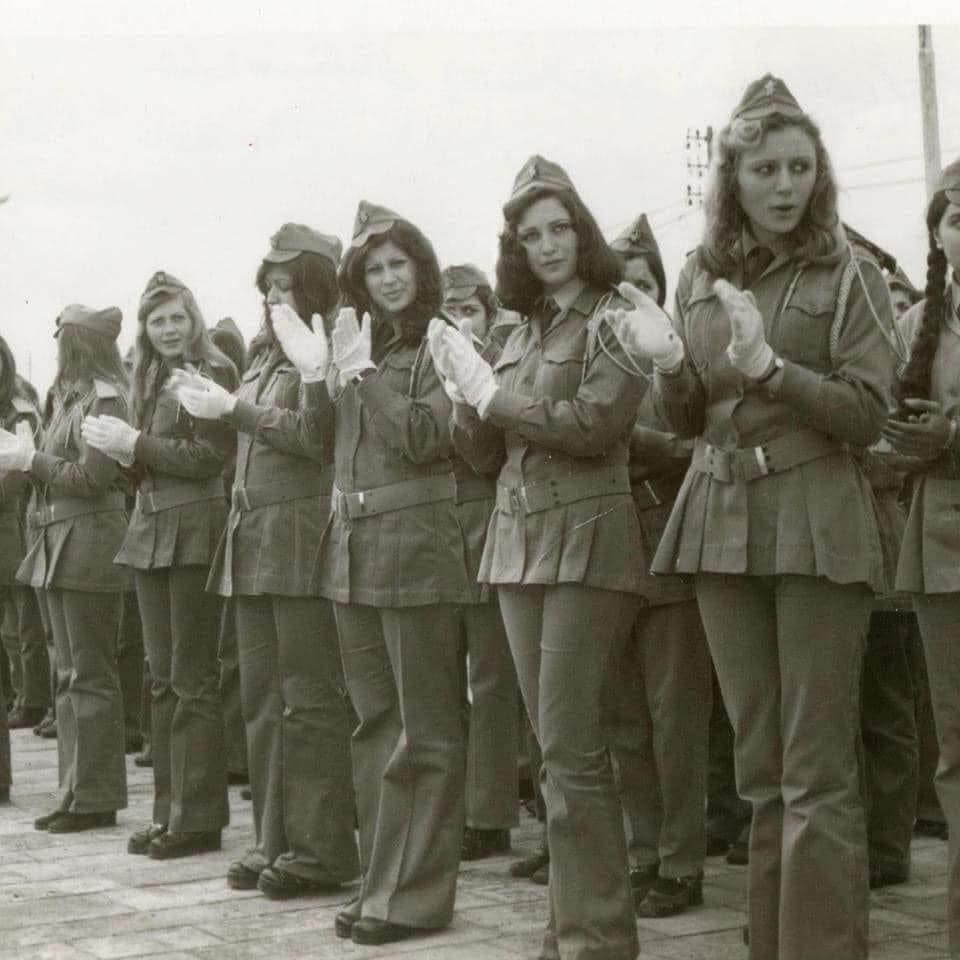
Syrian women in a military uniform during the neo-Ba'athist demonstration

Though a Christian, Michel Aflaq viewed the creation of Islam as proof of "Arab genius" and a testament of Arab culture, values, and thought. According to Aflaq, the essence of Islam was its revolutionary qualities. Aflaq called on all Arabs, both Muslims and non-Muslims alike, to admire the role Islam had played in creating an Arab character, but his view on Islam was purely spiritual and Aflaq emphasized that it "should not be imposed" on state and society. However, during Jadid's rule, it's changed: neo-Ba'athist ideologues openly denounced religion as a source of what they considered the "backwardness" of the Arabs. The new regime decreed that religious schools were to be closed, religious institutions nationalized, the powers of religious leaders curtailed, and religious provisions removed from the constitution, among other anti-religious measures. The Jadid regime was very anti-religious and imposed severe restrictions on religious freedom, banning religious preaching and persecuting the clergy. Neo-Ba'athists viewed the religious clerics as class enemies to be liquidated by the Ba'athist state. The party disseminated the doctrine of the "Arab Socialist New Man", which conceptualised the "new Arab man" as an atheist who campaigned for socialist revolution and rejected religion, feudalism, imperialism, capitalism, and every value of the old social order. While state ministers, officials, educators, etc. regularly preached about the "perils of religion"; party periodicals and magazines during the 1960s regularly made predictions about the "impending demise" of religion through the socialist revolution. Anti-religiosity even extended to the regime's main social support base, the Alawites: Jadid was extremely afraid that religious sheikhs would "crush them", if any religion will spread. Jadid's regime nationalized private schools of Muslim, Armenian and other communities in Syria.

In 1967, one of the ideologists of neo-Ba'athism, Ibrahim Khalas, wrote an article "The Path to Creation of the New Arab Man" which openly supported atheism. The article provoked mass protests, and to quell them, the Jadid regime imprisoned Khalas. However, despite his "recantation" of the atheistic article, the party's policy was aimed at secularizing society, and atheism was becoming increasingly widespread among its members.

== Foreign policy ==
=== Six-Day War ===
==== Background ====
From the very first moment of coming to power, Jadid pursued a very aggressive and provocative policy towards Israel, from public militant statements to supporting the military actions of the Palestinian fedayeen and the shelling of Israeli border points. According to Israeli sources, the regime in Syria initiated 177 border incidents and aided 75 Palestinian resistance incidents between 23 February 1966 and 15 May 1967. It was Syria's hardline policy towards Israel that became one of the main reasons for the war in 1967.

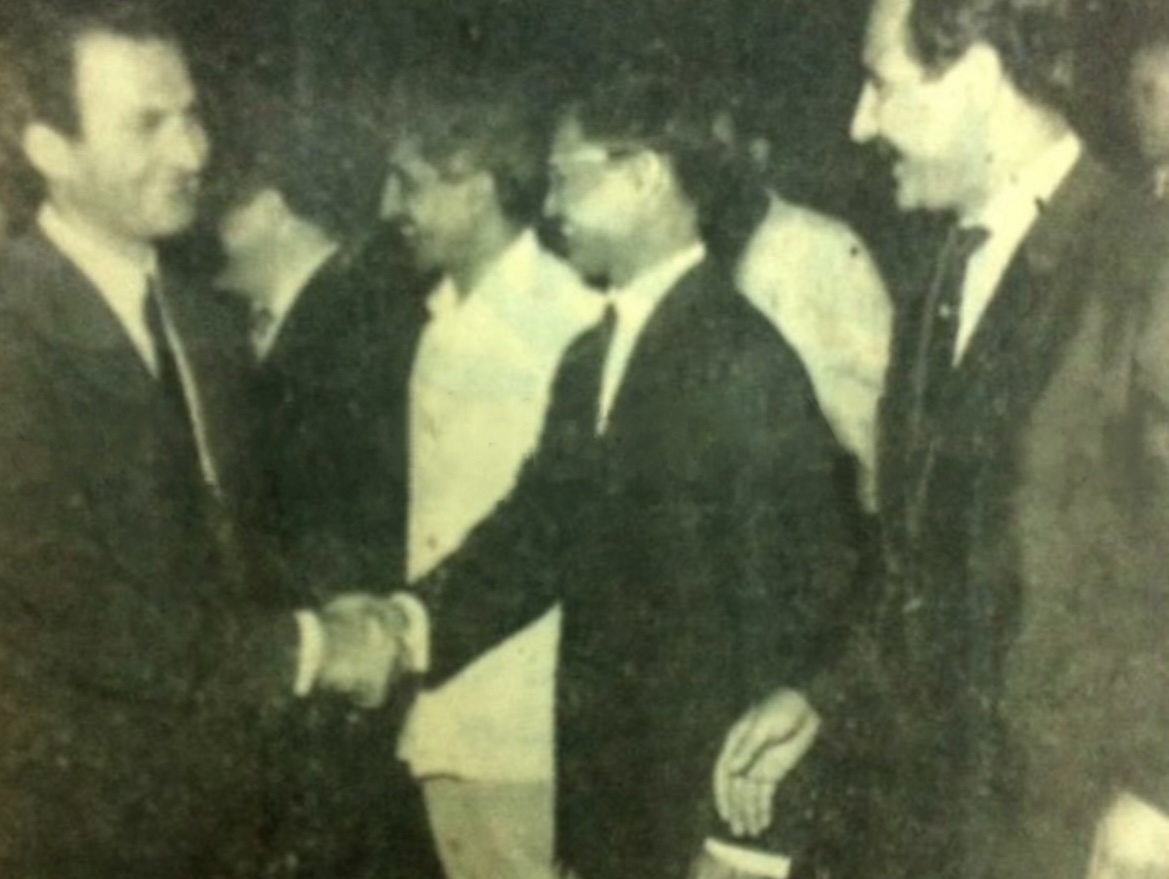
Jadid (left) welcoming Ba'ath Party members in 1967

The Soviet Union repeatedly warned Jadid against starting a war. When diplomacy failed, the USSR, in an attempt to at least frighten the neo-Ba'athist regime with the prospect of a real war, deliberately falsely reported a strong concentration of Israeli troops on the border. However, instead of giving in, Jadid believed it and passed this information on to Egypt (with whom he had a military cooperation pact). In response, the Egyptian generals, fully convinced of the strength of their army, assembled large forces already in Sinai Peninsula and closed the passage of Israeli ships through the Straits of Tiran. However, even as the Egyptians were gathering their troops in Sinai, the warlike Syrian leaders did nothing.

In late May 1967, Egyptian Army Commander-in-Chief Abdel Hakim Amer demanded President Gamal Abdel Nasser's permission for the Egyptian Air Force to attack strategic Israeli targets such as military air bases, fuel depots and ammunition depots in order to gain a military advantage, but Nasser feared that Egypt would be accused of hostility and ignoring Soviet requests to prevent war, and did not give permission. Perhaps this is what caused Egypt's disastrous defeat.

==== The war ====
On 5 June at 7:45 Israeli time, with civil defense sirens sounding all over Israel, the IAF launched Operation Focus (Moked). All but 12 of its nearly 200 operational jets launched a mass attack against Egypt's airfields. The Egyptian defensive infrastructure was extremely poor, and no airfields were yet equipped with hardened aircraft shelters capable of protecting Egypt's warplanes. Most of the Israeli warplanes headed out over the Mediterranean Sea, flying low to avoid radar detection, before turning toward Egypt. Others flew over the Red Sea. The attack was a very successful and guaranteed Israeli air supremacy for the rest of the war. Attacks on other Arab air forces by Israel took place later in the day as hostilities broke out on other fronts.

During the first 4 days of the war, Syria remained on the sidelines of the fighting. However, false Egyptian reports of a crushing victory against the Israeli army and forecasts that Egyptian forces would soon be attacking Tel Aviv influenced Syria's decision to enter the war – in a sporadic manner – during this period. Syrian artillery began shelling northern Israel, and twelve Syrian jets attacked Israeli settlements in the Galilee. Israel eventually turned its attention to Syria and captured two-thirds of the Golan Heights in just 48 hours. The war, which could have been avoided, has become a disaster for Syria with very long-term consequences.

=== Relations with other states ===
==== Soviet Union ====
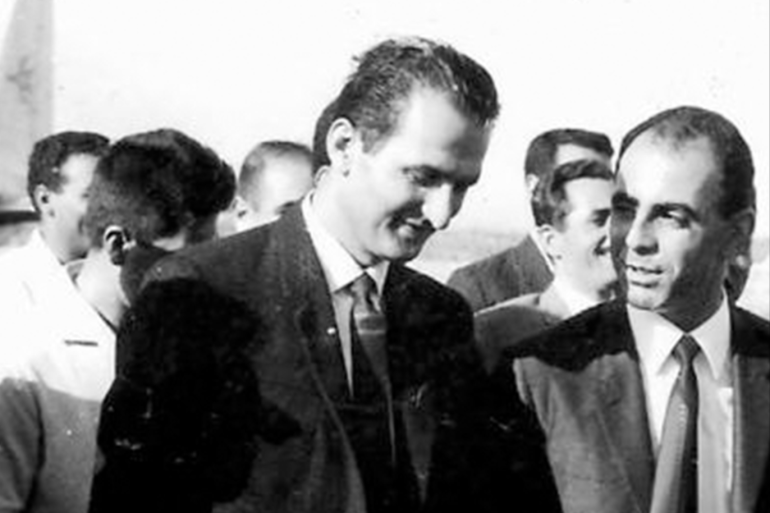
Jadid with members of the Regional Command, 1966

In the sphere of foreign policy, the neo-Ba'athist regime established close ties with the Soviet Union and its allies. Jadid's ideological orientation was toward socialist states and the Soviet sphere. The USSR however was in no hurry to accept Syria as a new ally, cautiously eyeing the new regime. Jadid, fearing to be left isolated without any allies and generally sympathizing with the USSR, embarked on a PR campaign to achieve Soviet friendship through pro-Soviet statements and policies extremely close to communism, and actively hoped for the protection of Syria by the Soviets in future. As a result, he achieved his goals: the USSR agreed to accept Syria as its new ally. Soon, Syria began receiving large amounts of weaponry and aid from the Soviets. Jadid's Marxist-Leninist regime quickly established strong ties with the Syrian communists as well as the CPSU. But at the same time, the Syrian delegation to the UN often came into conflict with the Soviet agenda and was perhaps the most outspoken of the Arab delegations in their opposition to the Soviet-American compromise agreement embodied in Security Council Resolution 242 of 22 November 1967, which was to provide a framework for the Arab-Israeli negotiations. In addition, Jadid resented the USSR efforts to dissuade him from going to war with Israel.

==== Eastern bloc and others ====
The new regime was extreme left in many respects, including international relations. Since Syria under Jadid had established strong ties with the USSR, it was quickly able to establish similar ties with its allies and other socialist states. Jadid's regime became very close to the Eastern bloc and other countries, such as Cuba, Yugoslavia, Sudan, Libya, East Germany, Bulgaria, etc., which were against the Western world.

==== United States ====
Relations with the US remained poor throughout Jadid's reign: after the Six-Day War they were broken off, and in 1970 the US expressed its willingness to intervene in the Jordanian Crisis and support the Hashemite monarchy (to the detriment of the invading Syrian forces).

==== Western bloc and others ====
Since the regime was close to the Eastern Bloc, its relations with the Western Bloc were automatically poor. Jadid cooled Syria's relations to the point of breaking diplomatic ties with various influential Western countries such as the Britain or West Germany.

==== Relations with Israel ====
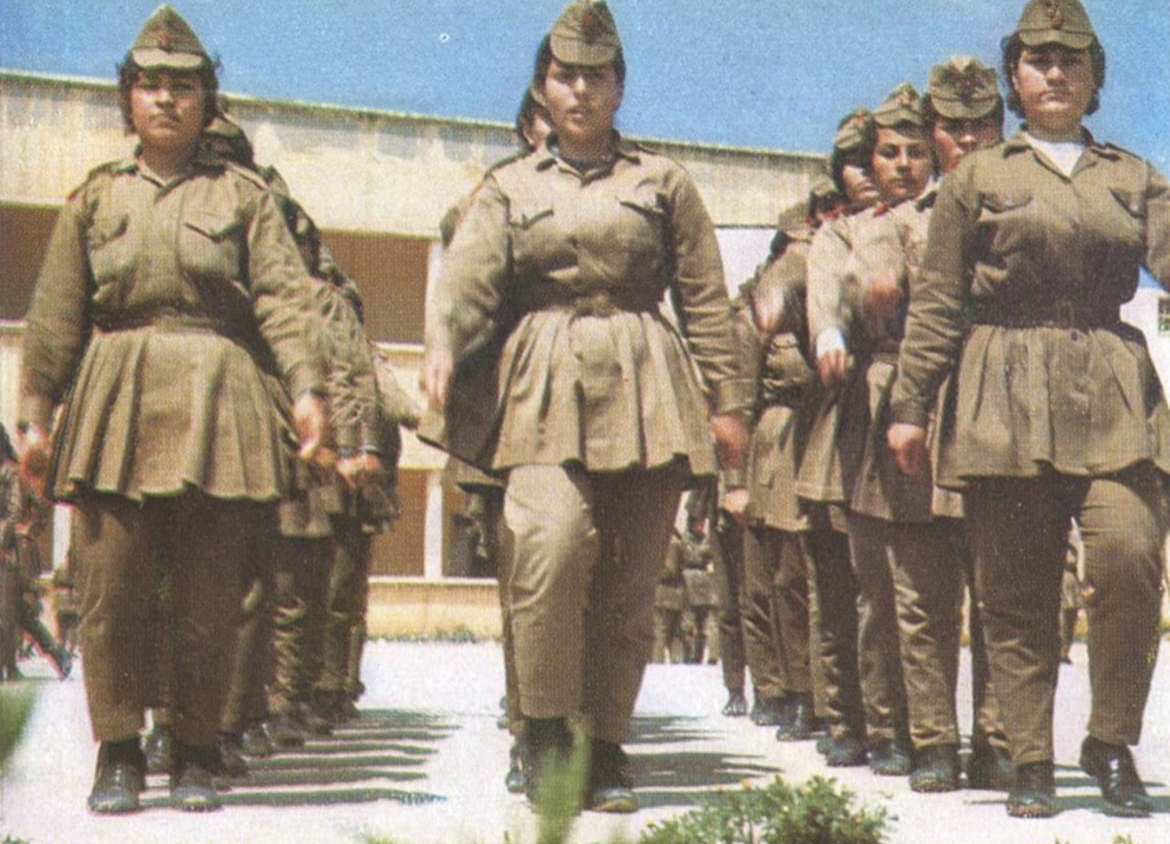
Women in military uniform.

Relations with Israel were already poor, but under Jadid, Syria adopted a more confrontational and hardline approach. However Syria was not ready for war, a situation compounded by numerous political purges in the army. Jadid's regime called for the mobilization of a "people's war" against Zionism, a policy expressed through significant support for leftist Palestinian fedayeen groups, who Jadid granted considerable autonomy and allowed to carry out attacks on Israel from Syrian territory, such policies were continued even after Syria's defeat in the 1967 war. Israel has repeatedly accused Syria of supporting Palestinian groups and their acts of violence. At the end of May 1967, the headlines of Syrian newspapers clearly stated that for the neo-Ba'athist regime, war was the only solution to the Israeli problem. The Jadid regime sought to establish itself as the center of a regional anti-imperialist revolution, which also resulted in significantly increased support for Palestinian militants.

Within months after taking power, Jadid's regime completed the formation of a Palestinian paramilitary Ba'athist group called al-Sa'iqa, which carried out attacks on Israel from Jordanian and Lebanese territory, but was under the control of the regime in Syria. Al-Sa'iqa became an important proxy for the Jadid regime: it was present in neighboring Arab countries and diminished the image of other fedayeen groups. Following the creation of al-Sa'iqa, Syrian pressure forced Fatah to move its bases and training camps from Syria to Jordan. Syria-controlled al-Saiqa successfully replaced the uncontrolled Fatah.

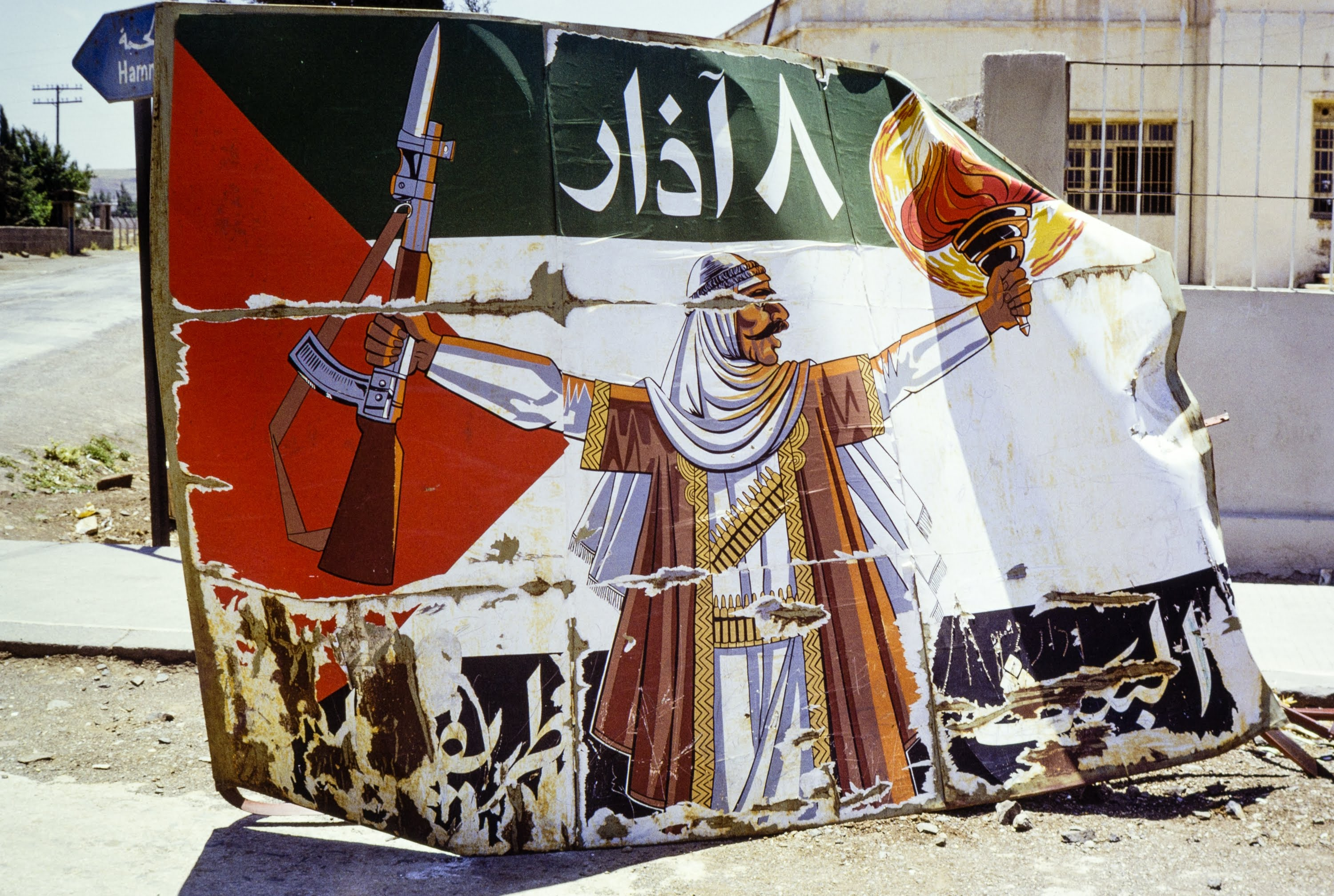
The pro-Palestinian propaganda poster in the Golan Heights, destroyed after the Six-Day War

According to Joseph Mann's "Syria, the Precipitator of the Six-Day War" book, "Jadid believed that in order to defeat Israel, it was necessary to send armed Palestinian guerrilla and militant groups into Israel as a vanguard, thereby drawing Israel, against its will, into an all-out war against all Arab countries, which would lead to the liberation of Palestine. Once Jadid and his allies came to power, they began to argue that popular struggle, based on the system used by the FLN in Algeria and the Viet Cong in Vietnam, was the best formula for destroying the State of Israel. The neo-Ba'athist regime believed that only an uncompromising scorched earth war could liberate the Arabs of the Middle East and their lands from Zionist rule and from the drive of Western powers to expand across Arab lands until they conquered them all. Syrian-backed guerrilla warfare and terrorism were aimed at damaging Israel's infrastructure and ruining its economy. Jadid believed that foreign investors would stay away and Israel's economy would become unprofitable. Another goal was to wear down the Israeli military by forcing it to deal with terrorist activity and to force Israel to spend money on deterrence and defense, which would disrupt the army's training and procurement of regular equipment. Syrian operations, the neo-Ba'athist leaders believed, would give them time to reduce the military disparity between the Arab countries and Israel and would soon prepare the Arab armies for a conventional war. Moreover, the Syrians wanted to force the other Arab states to sit down and recognize Syria as the only one fighting for the Palestinian cause, no matter the price it had to pay. The Syrian leadership promoted the idea of a “people's war” as much as possible, preaching and exploiting the mass belief that the people's struggle was justified and effective. The regime devoted much effort and resources to convincing its citizens of this. The Syrian leaders argued that the mission of liberating Palestine was the responsibility of the forces of revolution and progress, which would be represented by the majority of sections of Arab society: farmers, merchants, students, intellectuals, revolutionaries, and others. And yet, despite the bellicose statements they made on every occasion, the leaders themselves did not believe that Syria was capable of defeating Israel on its own."

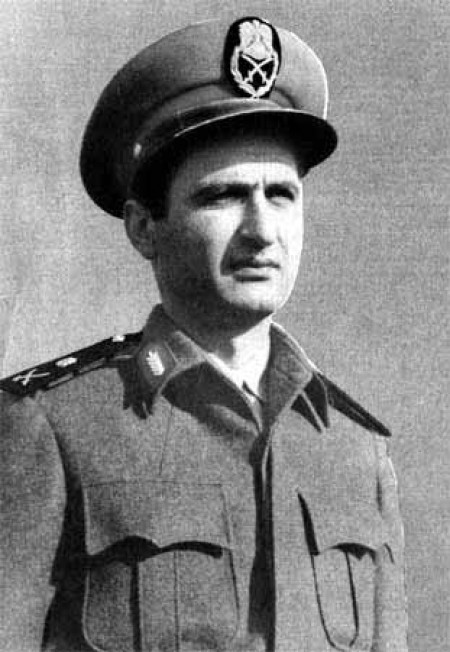
Salah Jadid after 1966 coup

Jadid believed that it was Syria that should lead the new war against Israel, claiming that it was Syria that raised the issue of Palestine at Arab League and the United Nations summits.

Syria's aggressive rhetoric soon changed to the action. By the end of 1966, terrorist and guerilla attacks as well as sabotage acts had intensified, backed by Syrian support and anti-Israeli threats. The goal was to force Israel to launch a counter-insurgency that would draw the entire Middle East into the war. Of all the Arab states that supported the idea of armed conflict in any ways, Jadid's Syria was the most outspoken and aggressive. However, Syria vehemently denied direct participation and their support for Palestinian militias, giving various justifications. Reckless acts of aggression and provocation, which were highly disapproved of by the Soviet Union, eventually led to a war that turned out to be a disaster for Syria.

In addition to supporting the Palestinian fedayeen, within the framework of "People's war" concept, the Jadid regime was engaged in training a "Civil Army" by sending army instructors to populated areas to provide military training to citizens. The Jadid's regime was able to create a civil militia and a massive peasant army soon after coming to power.

==== Relations with Arab world ====
The main principles of the Jadid's regime were to support Syrian nationalism rather than the Pan-Arabism, which meant concentrating on Syria itself and abandoning the idea of a single Arab nation as sought by the founders of the Ba'athism, al-Bitar and Aflaq. Jadid's regime was largely indifferent to pan-Arab causes except for Palestine, and pursued hardline policies towards so-called "reactionary" Arab states, especially Saudi Arabia and Jordan, (because of this, Syria did not receive aid from other Arab countries. Egypt and Jordan, which participated in the 1967 war, received £135 million per year for an undisclosed period). After the 1966 coup d'etat, the new regime immediately launched an unprecedented series of verbal attacks against the Saudi monarchy and its rulers. According to the "King Faisal and the Challenge of Nasser's Revolutionary Ideology" journal article, the Syrians claimed they would instigate a "revolutionary wave that would engulf the Middle East" bringing about the collapse of the old guard western backed monarchies, first and foremost Saudi Arabia.

Relations with Jordan were particularly bad, with the countries coming close to war several times. They planned to send Palestinian fedayeen to attack Israel, including through Jordan, which would force them into the war, making them an ally and at the same time vulnerable to a Syrian attack. Ultimately, Jordanian attempts to prevent fedayeen operations from its territory have completely failed: Israel has always responded with military force, weakening the Jordanian monarchy.

Saudi Arabia, on the other hand, conducted a propaganda campaign against the atheistic regime of Jadid and in 1967 expelled a number of Syrian diplomats, suspecting them of subversive activities in favor of the Syrian regime.

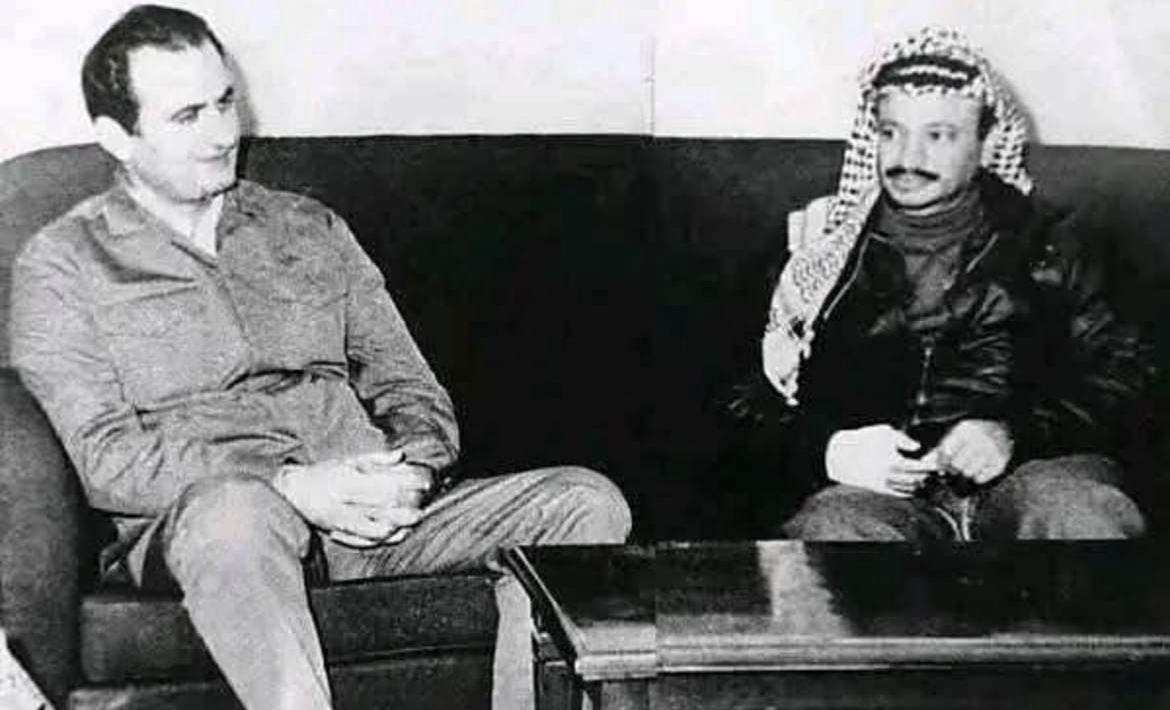
Jadid meets with Yasser Arafat, 1969

Jadid called for the mobilization of a "people's war" against Zionism, rather than inter-Arab military alliances. Much of the propaganda in 1966-67 was devoted to the theme of a "people's liberation war" of an Arabs on the supposed models of Algerian and Vietnamese wars. To shore up domestic support and unite the Arab world behind him, Jadid used extreme positions by threatening Israel. According to the Washington institute for Near East policy, "the state-run Radio Damascus gushed, "Arab masses, this is your day. Fight, Arabs we have decided to oust you, aggressors (Israel)."" Jadid pursued an isolationist policy until 1969, which also led to very tense relations with a number of countries in the region. Strategically, Syria was less important than, for example, Egypt, but during Jadid's time it compensated for this with a very aggressive foreign policy that had no equal in the Arab world.

In addition, Jadid was an active enemy of countries he believed were oppressing their Arab minority, such as Ethiopia and Iran and harbored Arab separatists from the Khuzestan province and members of the Eritrean Liberation Front.

== Downfall and death ==
=== After the 1967 war ===
Public support for Jadid's government, such as it was, declined sharply following Syria's defeat in the 1967 Six-Day War, when Israel captured the Golan Heights, and as a result of the troubled internal conditions of the country: it provoked a furious quarrel among Syria's leadership. The civilian leadership blamed military incompetence, and the military responded by criticizing the civilian leadership.

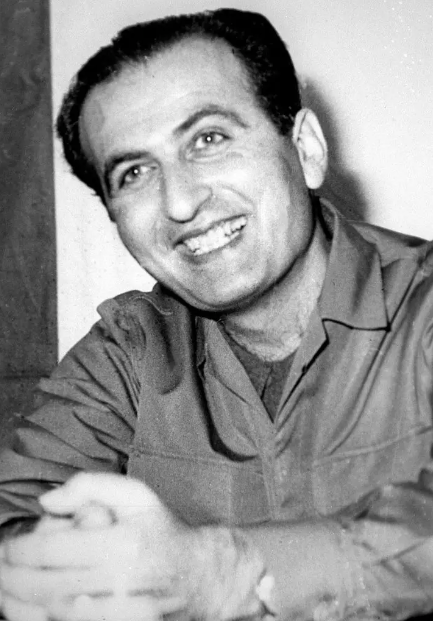
Salah Jadid in military uniform

After the war, in particular, tensions began to increase between Jadid's followers and those who argued that the situation called for a more moderate stance on socialism and international relations. This group coalesced around Defense Minister Hafez al-Assad, who protested the "adventurism" of Jadid, and demanded a normalization of the internal situation by adopting a permanent constitution, liberalizing the economy, and mending ties with non-Ba'athist groups, as well as the external situation, by seeking an alliance with even conservative Arab states: Assad argued that the government should take steps to improve relations with Jordan, Iraq and Egypt to facilitate coordinated military planning with them. Even before the 1967 war, Assad actively condemned and opposed Jadid's provocative actions and remarks against the State of Israel. Jadid's regime gave a lot of support to the leftist fedayeen, but Assad already then considered this a bad decision. In his opinion, the militants were given too much autonomy in attacks on Israel, which provoked the Six-Day War: he demanded a strong reduction in the autonomy of the fedayeen and the transfer of control over them to the army. Assad also disagreed with the very essence of the concept of a "people's war" as promoted by Jadid, which put a heavy focus on guerrilla warfare: as the Minister of Defense, Assad was responsible for commanding the standard army, not for the command of guerrilla groups which he mistrusted. This strategy was attractive to President Atassi, a veteran of the Algerian war, for example, but not to Assad. Assad also insisted that the party should be removed from military affairs and that the Armed Forces should receive an even larger budget from economic development projects: however, Jadid and his colleagues resisted these demands, and the Regional Party Congress held in September 1968 rejected them. Since the start of the conflict between Assad and Jadid, the Palestinian fedayeen had become another lever for the various factions who struggle for power. For example, al-Sa'iqa, formed in 1966, had expanded into a large militia of thousands of fighters by 1969: Jadid used it as a counterweight to Assad's armed supporters.

Jadid's avowedly radical Marxist regime was hated by about half a dozen other leftist factions in Syria. Even in 1968, Jadid continued to refuse to approve the formation of a proposed "Progressive Front" with various Nasserist, Houranist and other leftist elements. While Jadid retained the allegiance of most of the civilian Ba'ath apparatus, Assad as defense minister gradually asserted control over the military wing of the party. In 1969, Assad purged several Jadid loyalists, and from that point on Jadid had lost his preeminence in the state.

=== 1969 incident ===
From 25 to 28 February 1969, general Assad initiated "something just short of a coup". Under Assad's authority, tanks were moved into Damascus and the staffs of al-Ba'ath and al-Thawra (two-party newspapers) and radio stations in Damascus and Aleppo were replaced with Assad loyalists. Latakia and Tartus, two Alawite-dominated cities, saw "fierce scuffles" ending with the overthrow of Jadid's supporters from local posts. Shortly afterwards, a wave of arrests of Jundi loyalists began. On 2 March, after a telephone argument with head of military intelligence Ali Duba, Abd al-Karim al-Jundi, head the National Security Bureau and important ally of Jadid, committed suicide. When Zu'ayyin heard the news he wept, saying "we are all orphaned now" (referring to his and Jadid's loss of their protector). Despite his rivalry with Jundi, Assad is said to have also wept when he heard the news.

=== Invasion of Jordan ===
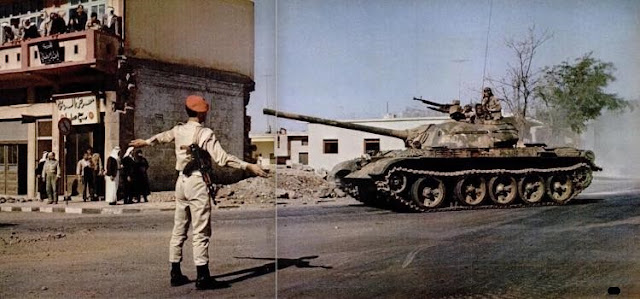
Syrian tank in the invasion of Jordan

In 1970, when conflict erupted between the Palestine Liberation Organization (PLO) and the Jordanian army, Jadid sent troops - ostensibly of the Palestine Liberation Army but actually regular Syrian army troops - into Jordan to aid the PLO. After the initial military successes of the invasion, King Hussein asked Israel to carry out airstrikes against Syrian troops together with the Jordanian Air Force. The airstrikes caused heavy losses for the Syrian troops, due to a lack of air defense systems and the fact that the commander of the Syrian Air Force, Assad, did not agree to send squadrons to Jordan to support the invading army. The decision to invade Jordan was not generally welcomed by Assad's more moderate Ba'ath faction, and the troops withdrew.

=== Internal conflict ===
The action helped trigger a simmering conflict between the Jadid and Assad factions within the Ba'ath Party and army. The Syrian Communist Party aligned itself with Jadid, drawing him the support of Soviet ambassador, Nuritdin Mukhitdinov. Angered by this, Assad decided to scare the Soviets by sending Mustafa Tlass to Beijing to procure arms and wave Chairman Mao's Little Red Book. Assadists began dismantling Jadid's support network, facing ineffectual resistance from the civilian branch of the party that remained under Jadid's control.

=== 1970 Coup d'etat ===
In November 1970, Jadid tried to fire Assad and his supporter Mustafa Tlass. Assad responded by launching an intra-party coup dubbed the Corrective Revolution. Although many mid-level officials were offered posts in Syrian embassies abroad, Jadid refused: "If I ever take power, you will be dragged through the streets until you die." Jadid was arrested on 13 November 1970, and remained in the Mezzeh prison. The coup was calm and bloodless; the only evidence of change to the outside world was the disappearance of newspapers, radio and television stations. A Temporary Regional Command was soon established, and on 16 November the new government published its first decree.

=== Death ===
Jadid was arrested and remained in the Mezzeh prison in Damascus. He was released from prison only shortly before his death of a heart attack on 19 August 1993.

== Bibliography ==
- Moubayed, Sami M. (2006). Steel & Silk: Men and Women who shaped Syria 1900–2000. Cune Press. ISBN 978-1-885942-41-8.
- Seale, Patrick (1990). Asad of Syria: The Struggle for the Middle East. University of California Press. ISBN 978-0-520-06976-3.
- Tucker, Spencer; Roberts, Priscilla Mary (2008). The encyclopedia of the Arab–Israeli conflict: a Political, Social, and Military History: A–F. Vol. 1. ABC-CLIO. ISBN 978-1-85109-841-5.
- Bernhard Valentinitsch: Historisch-Politische Hintergründe in Eric Amblers Polit-Thriller ‚The Levanter‘. In: Journal for Intelligence, Propaganda and Security Studies (JIPSS). Band 7, Nr. 1/2013, Graz 2013, S. 7–23 (about Jadid and PLO)
