= Atassi family =

Prominent Syrian family

Al-Atassi Family
- Parent family: Banu Hashim; Banu al-Husayn; Ba 'Alawi sada; al-Saqqaf; al-Attas
- Current region: Homs, Syria
- Origin: Hadhramaut
- Founded: late 15th century AD
- Founder: Sayyid Ali ibn Khalil al-Attas
- Members: Hashim al-Atassi; Khaled al-Atassi; Wasfi al-Atassi; Radwan al-Atassi; Lu'ay al-Atassi; Rami al-atassi Suheir Atassi; Jad al-Atassi
- Connected families: Al-Sayed Suleiman, Majaj, Khaled
- Distinctions: Husayn ibn Ali
- Traditions: Traditional muftis of Homs
- Estate: Homs

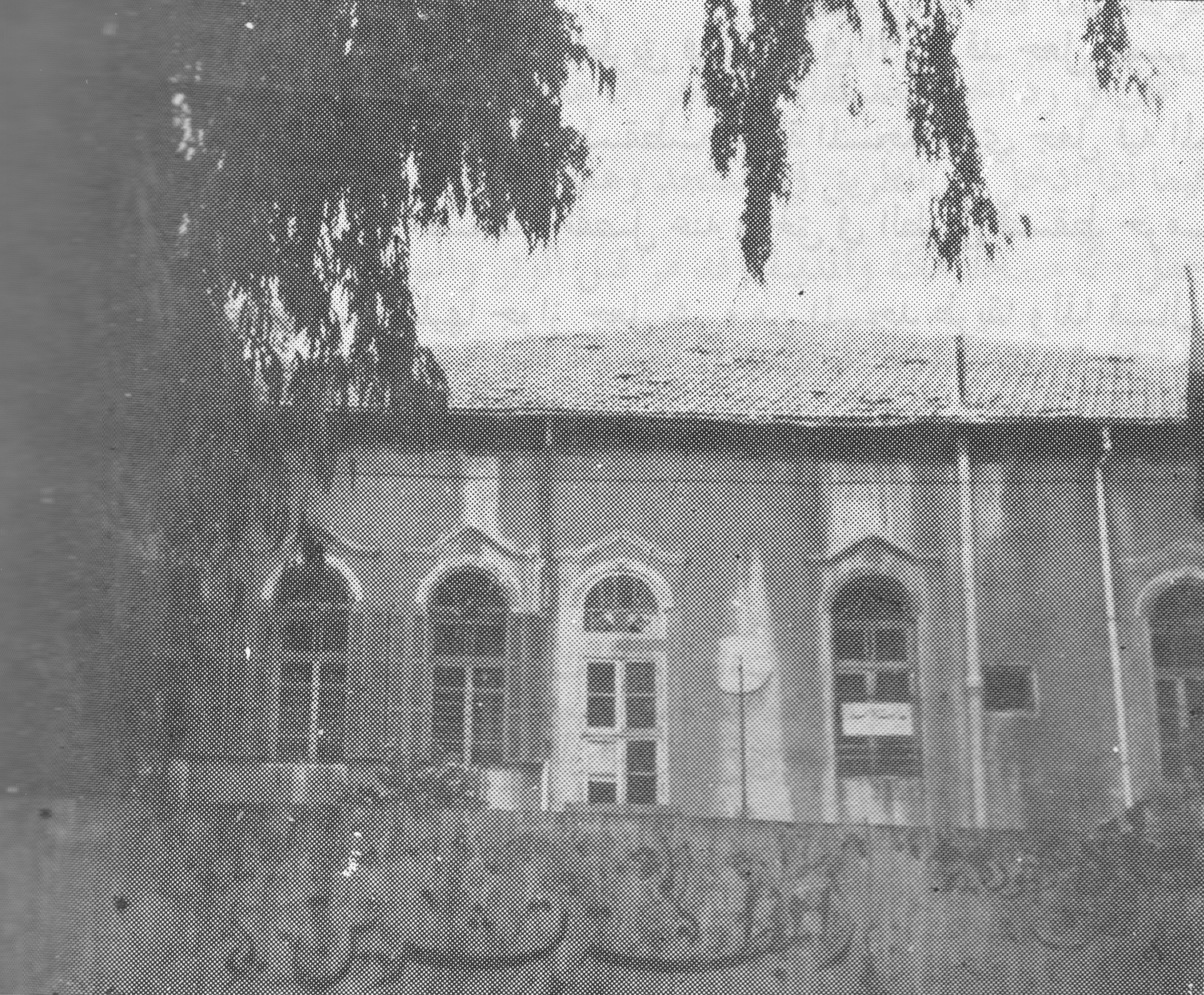
Residence of Khaled Efendi al-Atassi, the head of The Atassi House, built in 1893

al-Atassi (Arabic: الأتاسي) is a prominent Syrian Arab family of Hashemite origin, descending from Husayn ibn Ali. The presence of the family in Homs, Syria dates back to the 15th century AD, during which the family's ancestors had arrived from Hadhramaut in Yemen after travelling through the Hejaz and Anatolia. In modern times, members of the family led the national movement against the French mandate. The power and prestige of the family reached an apex at the formation of the modern Republic of Syria in 1936, when its second head of state, Hashim al-Atassi was elected president. Two out of the seven members of the constitutional assembly who drafted the first constitution of Syria in 1919 were prominent scions of the al-Atassi family, Wasfi al-Atassi and Hashim al-Atassi. Two more scions, Lu'ay al-Atassi and Nureddin al-Atassi, were in turn installed as heads of state in the 1960s. Family members included magistrates, governors, ambassadors, heads of political parties, military officers and other public officials throughout Ottoman and modern times.

== Background ==
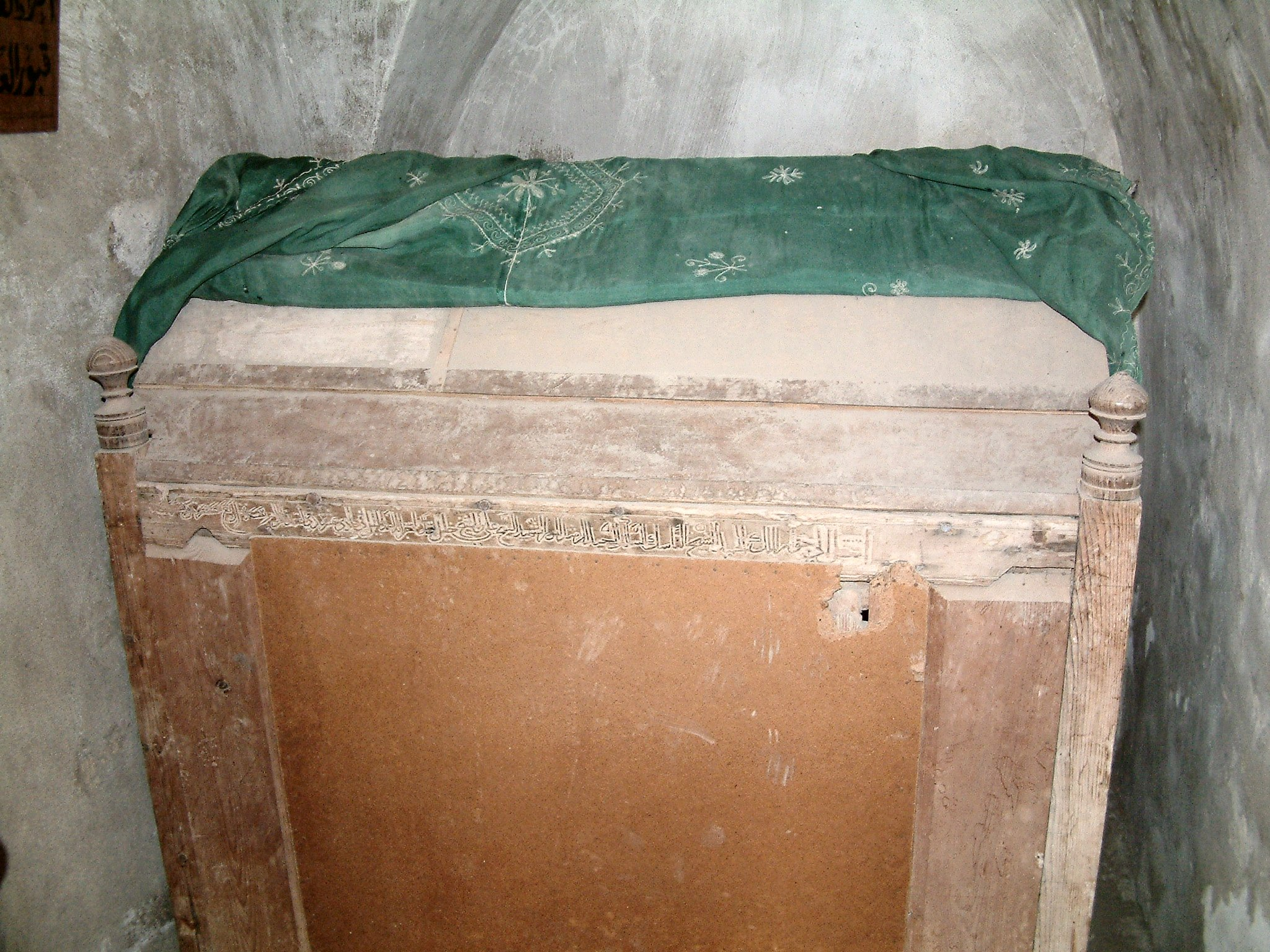
Tomb of Sayed Ali Bin Khalil Al-Atassi, who died in 1508, located in the Atassi Mosque, Homs

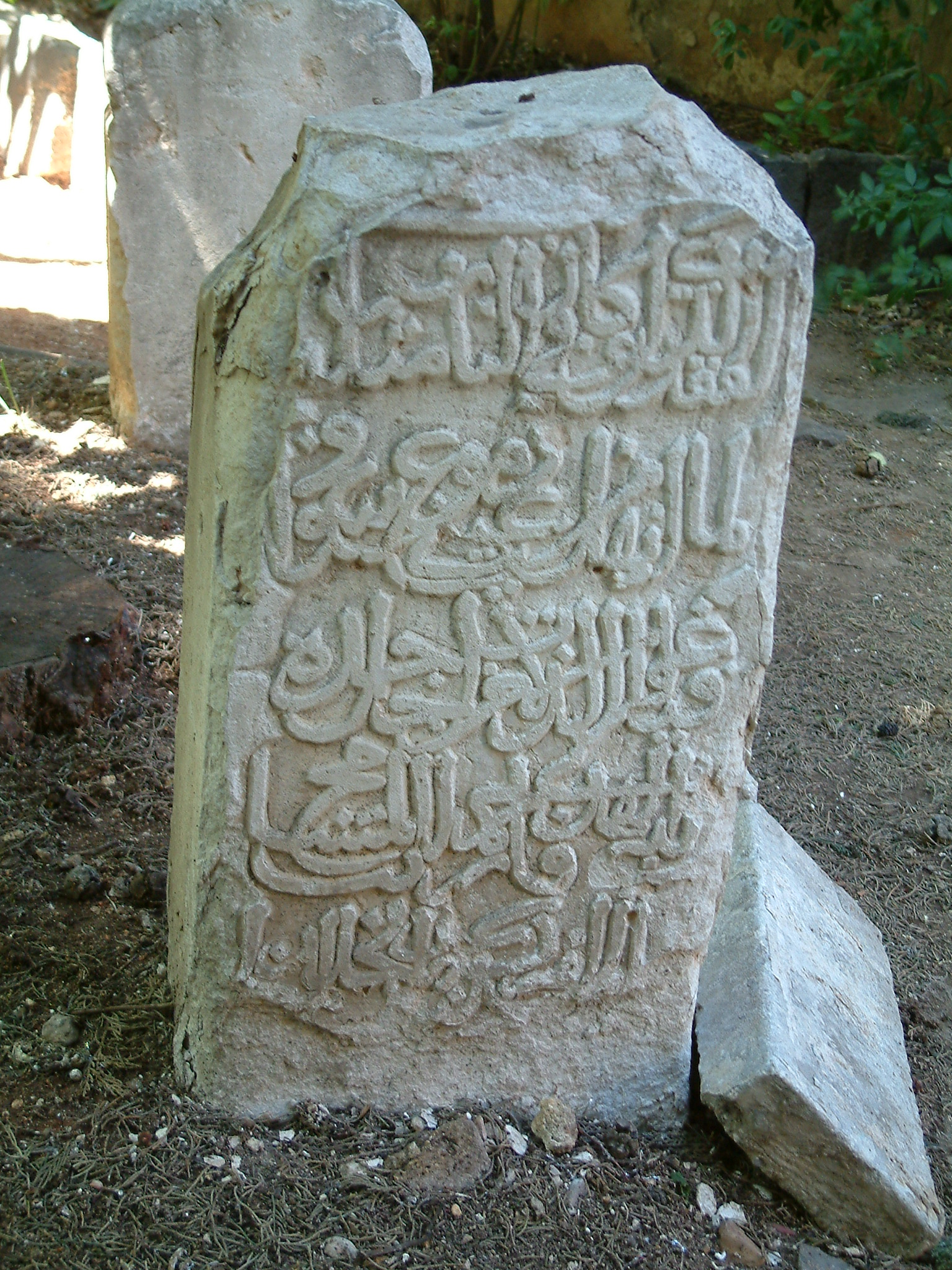
Tombstone of Sayed Saleh Al-Sayed Suleiman Al-Atassi, who died in 1782, located in the Atassi Mosque, Homs

The oldest mention of the family was in a religious manuscript, copied in service to one the family ancestors, Sheikh Sayyid Ibrahim bin Ahmad Al-Atassi, who was named a Imam by Prince Toghan bin Seqlesiz, a prince of the Turkmen.

The family's ancestor, Sayyid Ali ibn Khalil al-Attas was a scion of the al-Attas family of the Ba 'Alawi sada of Hadhramaut in Yemen. He had embarked on a journey towards the Hejaz, and from there had moved to Anatolia where he had married a Turkmen woman. Later he and his sons would settle in the city of Homs in Syria. Ali ibn Khalil al-Attas, was buried in 1508 in a tomb inside a mosque which later became known as the Atassi Mosque. The tomb still exists today.

The name al-Atassi evolved from the word "العطاسي" (from "العطاس," meaning "the sneezer" in Arabic) which later changed to "الأطاسي" then to "الأتاسي" or Atassi. This name originates from a nickname of Sayyid Umar ibn Abdurrahman al-Saqqaf, a renowned Sufi saint of Hadhramaut from whom the al-Attas family of Hadhramaut descends. It is said that Umar al-Saqqaf had sneezed and praised God while he was in his mother's womb, from then on he was called 'al-Attas'. Umar al-Saqqaf was a descendant of Sheikh Abdurrahman al-Saqqaf who descended from Faqih al-Muqaddam Sayyid Muhammad ibn Ali Ba 'Alawi, a Sharif scholar descended from Ali al-Uraydi and Husayn ibn Ali through Ahmad al-Muhajir.

Sayyid Umar ibn Abdurrahman al-Attas al-Saqqaf's lineage is recorded as follows; Umar al-Attas ibn Abdurrahman ibn Aqil ibn Salim ibn Ubaydullah ibn Abdurrahman ibn Abdullah ibn Sheikh Abdurrahman al-Saqqaf ibn Sheikh Muhammad Mawla al-Dawilah ibn Ali Mawla al-Darak ibn ‘Alawi al-Ghayur ibn al-Faqih al-Muqaddam Muhammad ibn Ali ibn Muhammad Sahib Mirbat ibn `Ali Khali’ Qasam ibn ‘Alawi ibn Muhammad Sahib al-Sawma’ah ibn ‘Alawi ibn ‘Ubaydullah ibn al-Imam al-Muhajir il-Allah Ahmad ibn ‘Isa ibn Muhammad al-Naqib ibn Ali al-‘Uraydi ibn Ja’far al- Sadiq ibn Muhammad al-Baqir ibn Ali Zayn al-‘Abidin ibn Husayn al-Sibt ibn Ali bin Abi Talib and Fatimah al-Zahra.

Many later leading family members assumed prominent religious and political positions in Ottoman, French, and Independent Syria.

== Atassi muftis of Homs and Tripoli ==
The office of Mufti of the town of Homs, the highest religious jurisdiction in the city, was hereditary in the Atassi family for over four centuries. At least eighteen Atassi scholars held this position. In addition, two Atassis are known to have been Muftis of the city of Tripoli as well. The Sibaie House of Homs was another scholarly family who were often in competition with the Atassi House for the seat of the mufti, and the Sibaie were able to secure it at least four times in the town history.

The following are members of the family who attained the position of mufti:

(Dates represent period served in that position)

- Al-Shihab Ahmad Sham al-Deen ibn Khalil al-Atassi, The first. 1533-1596.
- Mahmood ibn Ahmad al-Atassi. Held position starting in 1596.
- Ahmad ibn Mahmood al-Atassi, the second. Held position until death in 1653.
- Hasan ibn Mahmood al-Atassi. Held position starting in 1653.
- Mohammad ibn Ahmad al-Atassi, the first. Held position until death in 1698.
- Ali ibn Hasan al-Atassi. Held position starting in 1703.
- Abdul-Wahhab ibn Ali al-Atassi. mid-18th century, period not exactly known.
- Burhan Al-Deen Ibraheem ibn Ali al-Atassi. Late 18th century, period in Homs not known, Mufti of Homs, later of Tripoli.
- Yaseen ibn Ibraheem al-Atassi, Mufti of Tripoli.
- Abdul-Sattar ibn Ibraheem al-Atassi. 1805-1829.
- Saeed ibn Abdul-Sattar al-Atassi. 1830-1854.
- Mohammad Abu-Al-Fath ibn Abdul-Sattar al-Atassi, the second. 1852-1882.
- Mohammad Khaled ibn Mohammad al-Atassi. 1885-1894.
- Abdul-Lateef ibn Mohammad Al-Atassi. 1894-1914
- Mohammad Taher ibn M. Khaled al-Atassi. 1914-1940.
- Mohammad Tawfeeq ibn Abdul-Lateef al-Atassi. 1940-1965.
- Badr Al-Deen ibn Mahmood al-Atassi. 1965-1966.
- Mohammad Tayyeb ibn Abdul-Fattah al-Atassi. 1966-1984.
- Zuhair bin Abdul-Rahman Mumtaz Al-Atassi. 2017-current

Other members served as religious scholars in other capacities such as judges, chief clerks, and imams. One mufti, Sayed Ibraheem Efendi al-Atassi, also served as Mufti of Tripoli in the late 18th century. Taher al-Atassi served as the supreme judge of Basra in Iraq, and Nablus and Jerusalem in Palestine in the late Ottoman period.

Although members of the Atassi family were naturally involved in the politics of the city of Homs by virtue of holding the mufti position and by belonging to the wealthy class and being Ashraf, it was not until the late 19th century that they started holding non-religious governmental offices. Two scholars who held the position of mufti also held political offices: Khaled al-Atassi (1837–1908), and his son, Taher al-Atassi (1860–1940). In 1876, Sayed Khaled Efendi Al-Atassi was elected to the first parliament of the Ottoman Empire as the deputy from Homs and Hama. In 1922, Sayed Taher Efendi was elected to membership of the Council of the Syrian Union as the representative of Homs in the state of Damascus. Other Atassis have since held legislative positions.

The family achieved further influence through education with a tradition of sending the young men of the family to be educated at the Imperial capital of Istanbul during the Ottoman administration, and then to the Sorbonne and other European centers of learning during the French Mandate.

== Atassi heads of state ==
- Hashim al-Atassi, President of Syria: 1936-1939, December, 1949-September, 1950, September, 1950-December, 1951, February, 1954-September, 1955
- Lu'ay al-Atassi, President of the Revolutionary Council, vested with presidential powers, 1963
- Nureddin al-Atassi, President of Syria, 1966–1970

== Atassi members elected to the parliament and ruling councils ==
(dates represent year elected)

- Khaled al-Atassi, elected to the Ottoman parliament, 1876.
- Hashem al-Atassi, 1918, 1928, 1932, 1936.
- Wasfi Beik al-Atassi, Ottoman Parliament (1914), Syrian Congress (1918)
- Taher Efendi al-Atassi, 1922, member of the 15-membered Ruling Council of the Tri-State Union.
- Feidy Beik al-Atassi, 1923 (State of Damascus Assembly), 1947, 1949, 1954, 1961.
- Mukarram Al-Atassi, 1936, 1946.
- Adnan al-Atassi, 1943, 1947, 1954.
- Hilmi al-atassi, 1943.
- Dr. Shawqi al-Atassi, elected to the parliament of the United Arab Republic, 1960.
- Nureddin al-Atassi, 1965 (National Council)
- Ibtisam al-Sayed Suleiman al-Atassi, 2003.
- Suheir Atassi
- Mansour Al-Atassi
- Farah Al Atassi, leader in Syrian politics and International affairs. A founding member of the High negotiation Committee, National Syrian Women Association, Syrian American Cultural Center, Arab American Information and Resource Center, Syria American Business Council, Women in peace and Security, the Interfaith Dialogue Initiative, Ambassador of Syria to the UN.

== Atassi ministers in various cabinets ==
- Hashem Al-Atassi
- Faydi beik al-Atassi
- Adnan al-Atassi
- Mukarram al-Atassi
- Jamal al-Atassi
- Nureddin al-Atassi

== Atassi mayors of Homs ==
- Hasan al-Atassi, late 19th century.
- Najeeb Atassi, 1879.
- Omar al-Atassi, 1912.
- Mohammad Al-Atassi, 1920-1930.
- Feidi al-Atassi, 1931-1945.
- Mukarram al-Atassi, 1950s.
- Qasem al-Atassi, 1954-1957.
