= Nureddin al-Atassi =

President of Syria (1966–1970)

- نور الدين الأتاسي
- Atassi in 1970

Secretary General of the National Command of the Arab Socialist Ba'ath Party
- In office March 1966 – 18 November 1970
- Preceded by: Munif al-Razzaz (head of unitary Ba'ath Party)
- Succeeded by: Hafez al-Assad

Regional Secretary of the Regional Command of the Syrian Regional Branch
- In office March 1966 – 13 November 1970
- Deputy: Salah Jadid
- Preceded by: Amin al-Hafiz (Last Regional Command dissolved in December 1965)
- Succeeded by: Hafez al-Assad

Member of the Regional Command of the Syrian Regional Branch
- In office March 1966 – 18 November 1970
- In office 5 September 1963 – 19 December 1965

President of Syria
- In office 25 February 1966 – 18 November 1970
- Prime Minister: Yusuf Zuayyin; Himself
- Preceded by: Amin al-Hafiz
- Succeeded by: Ahmad al-Khatib (acting); Hafez al-Assad

Prime Minister of Syria
- In office 29 October 1968 – 18 November 1970
- Preceded by: Yusuf Zuayyin
- Succeeded by: Hafez al-Assad

Vice President of Syria
- In office 15 December 1964 – 28 December 1965
- President: Amin al-Hafiz; Yusuf Zuayyin
- Preceded by: Muhammad Umran
- Succeeded by: Shibli al-Aysami

Personal details
- Born: 11 January 1929 Homs, French Syria
- Died: 3 December 1992 (aged 63) Paris, France
- Party: Ba'ath Party
- Relations: Atassi family

Nureddin Mustafa Ali al-Atassi (Arabic: نور الدين مصطفى الأتاسي, romanized: Nūr ad-Dīn Muṣṭafā al-'Atāsī, 11 January 1929 – 3 December 1992) was a Syrian politician who served as the president of Syria from 1966 to 1970. Atassi was the first Syrian president to address the United Nations General Assembly, and the only one until Ahmed al-Sharaa did so in September 2025.

== Early life and education ==
Nureddin Al-Atassi, born in 1929 in Homs to an Arab family, and belonged to the renowned Al-Atassi family. Following his mother's early death, he was brought up by his paternal grandfather, Judge Fuad Effendi al-Atassi. Surrounded by his grandfather's intellectual circles, which were populated by poets and scholars, Nureddin developed a deep admiration for Arabic poetry from an early stage in his life.

Nureddin obtained his education in schools located in Homs and actively took part in the city's protests against French colonial rule throughout his early years. Despite being young, Nureddin's desire for reform motivated him to distribute pamphlets advocating for student disobedience in schools in Homs. However, his advocacy led to his arrest on one occasion prior to him turning fifteen years old.

In 1948, Atassi enrolled in the Faculty of Medicine at the University of Damascus. Throughout his time in the city, he established his ties with influential individuals in the Baath Party, such as Akram Al-Hourani and Michel Aflaq, who were rising leaders in the party during that period. Atassi has been affiliated with the Baath Party since 1944.

During his time in Damascus, Atassi actively engaged with the student group associated with the Baath Party. He was elected as a representative and then became the president of the leadership body, serving from 1948 to 1955 until he graduated from the Faculty of Medicine.

== Career ==
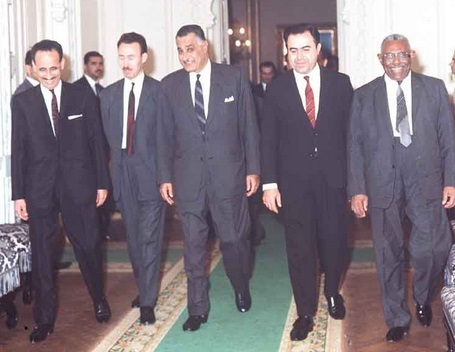
Arab heads of state in Cairo to discuss previous talks with Soviet leaders. From left to right: Abdul Rahman Arif of Iraq, Houari Boumediene of Algeria, Gamal Abdel Nasser of Egypt, Atassi and Ismail al-Azhari of Sudan, July 1967

After completing his education, Atassi served his mandatory duty, during which he observed the tripartite invasion of Egypt in 1956. He stood with the Syrian army when they relocated to Jordan in a show of unity.

Upon fulfilling his obligatory service, Atassi offered his assistance to the Algerian revolution, rendering medical aid to revolutionaries in close proximity to the Tunisian-Algerian border. After returning to Syria, Atassi focused on general surgery at Damascus Hospital. Afterwards, he took jobs at other hospitals in Damascus. Following that, he went back to his native city of Homs, where he persisted in his medical profession, working at the National Hospital and managing his own private clinic.

Following the March 8, 1963 coup, Atassi was designated as the Minister of the Interior in Salah al-Din al-Bitar's third government. This government served from 4 August 1963, until 12 November 1963. Afterwards, he assumed the position of Minister of the Interior in the first government of Amin al-Hafiz, which was established on 12 November 1963, and held the position until 14 May 1964. In October 1964, he took on the position of Deputy Prime Minister in the second administration of Amin Al-Hafiz. This government began on 3 October 1964, and ended on 23 May 1965. In addition, he was designated as a member of the National Revolutionary Council on 23 December 1965.

=== Presidency ===
Shortly after the February 23, 1966 coup, Atassi assumed the role of head of state and Secretary-General of the Baath Party.

Throughout his time in office, Atassi implemented substantial projects and participated in important domestic and international activities. Significantly, he entered into a partnership with the Soviet Union to build the Euphrates Dam and issued other decrees targeting economic and social change. These initiatives encompassed the formation of the Land Bank, the implementation of the Economic Penal Code, and the foundation of the People's Army, which was affiliated with the Ministry of Defense. In November 1967, Atassi took the lead in establishing the Central Financial Supervision Organization and the People's Legislative Council. This happened after the revolution, which resulted in the suspension of parliament. In addition, he founded the Supreme State Security Court and streamlined travel for people to Arab Economic Unity countries by allowing them to use ID cards instead of visas.

Atassi was the first Syrian president to address the United Nations General Assembly after the June 1967 War,

President Nureddin Al-Atassi of Syria at the United Nations, New York

Atassi additionally assembled numerous conferences and presented speeches, such as the urgent assembly of the Central Council of the Arab Workers Union to express solidarity with the fight against the Jewish state (May 1967), the inaugural gathering of the Committee for Defending the Homeland and Protecting the Revolution in Hasakah (November 1967), and the Arab Lawyers Conference in Damascus (September 1967).

Atassi adopted a strong stance towards specific Arab nations, aligning with Salah Jadid in this regard. Significantly, he supported the dismantling of oil pipelines owned by the Iraq Petroleum Company that traverse Syrian land. In addition, Atassi suspended the transportation of oil across Syrian territory until the corporation complied with Syrian requests.

Furthermore, Atassi provided support to a range of movements and causes, including giving his full backing to the Eritrean campaign for independence. Upon Eritrea's declaration of war on Ethiopia and its pursuit of independence, Atassi promptly recognized and endorsed their cause. He rendered support by sending insurgent groups, providing instruction, monetary assistance, and weaponry. The help provided by Atassi played a crucial role in Eritrea's final accomplishment of independence, resulting in lasting gratitude from the Eritrean population.

Additionally, Atassi's government demonstrated unity with Lebanon in its demands for the removal of King Hussein bin Talal and offered assistance to Palestinian combatants. Atassi intervened to advocate for the Palestinian cause during the "Black September" period, issuing a public threat to invade Jordan in response to ongoing violence against Palestinians. He commanded the Syrian army to progress, ensuring the safety of the Jordanian border and seizing Irbid in order to protect Palestinian interests.

On 13 November 1970, Defense Minister Hafez al-Assad orchestrated a coup d'état known as the Corrective Revolution, resulting in the overthrow of Atassi.

== Arrest and death ==
Following the coup, Atassi, along with other government officials, was detained without undergoing a trial. He was imprisoned in Mezzeh prison in Damascus for a period of 22 years. In early 1992, Atassi suffered a severe heart attack, leading to his transfer to a military hospital. Subsequent medical examinations revealed esophageal cancer, prompting authorities to detain him in the hospital as a political prisoner. During this time, access to Atassi was restricted to his immediate family members only. Atassi remained hospitalized for several months, during which his health deteriorated rapidly as the cancer progressed, spreading to his liver. Eventually, authorities decided to release him from detention. Following his release, he was transferred to his residence in the city of Homs.

In November 1992, the French authorities became aware of Atassi's medical condition and extended an offer to provide him with medical treatment which was rejected by Syrian authorities until he came into a state of semi-consciousness. Afterwards, he was sent to Paris where he received medical treatment at the American Hospital of Paris. Despite medical treatment, Atassi died on 3 December 1992, at the age of 63. His body was transported the following day to Homs, where he was laid to rest in the Al-Atassi family cemetery in Kafr Aya.
