= Khaled al-Atassi =

Syrian religious authority (c.1834–1908)

- خالد الأتاسي
- Born: Khaled Efendi al-Atassi al-Husseini c. 1834 – c. 1837; Homs, Syria Vilayet, Ottoman Empire
- Died: 1908; Homs, Syria Vilayet, Ottoman Empire
- Spouse: Ruqayyah Suleyman
- Children: Khalil al-Atassi; Hashem al-Atassi; Mazhar al-Atassi; Abd al-Hadi al-Atassi; Muhammad Abu al-Khair al-Atassi; Muhammad Taher al-Atassi; Muhammad Abu al-Nasr al-Atassi; Abd al-Karim al-Atassi
- Parent: Muhammad ibn Abd al-Sattar al-Atassi

Khaled Efendi al-Atassi al-Husseini (Arabic: خالد الأتاسي; c. 1834–October, 1908), was an Ottoman Syria religious authority, jurist, scholar and poet. Born in Homs to the famous Atassi family in 1837, he went through the traditional preparation for the position of Mufti, a post his family filled for over 400 years.

== Biography ==
There are some debate on his exact date of birth, with sources ranging from c. 1834 – c. 1837. His father, Muhammad Efendi Al-Atassi was the Grand Mufti of Homs, and so was his uncle, Saeed Al-Atassi. Khaled Efendi studied under famous Islamic scholars of his time in Homs and Damascus.

In 1876 he was elected as deputy of Homs and Hama to the parliament of the Ottoman Empire. He was also given the post of Mudarres (teacher) in the Mosque of Khaled ibn Al-Waleed in Homs, a post that was held by his family for generations. In 1861, and while his father was still alive, Khaled Efendi assumed the position of the Mufti. However, Islamic court registers of Homs later designate him as the Deputy-Mufti, and his father as the Mufti. In 1882 the Mufti of Homs, Mohammad Al-Atassi died, but the Ottoman administration handed the Mufti position to sheikh Hafez Al-Jindi Al-Abassi, who served as a Mufti till 1885. Khaled Efendi became the Mufti of Homs in 1885 by an official decree, and was removed from his post in 1894, to be filled by his brother, Abdu-Lateef Al-Atassi.

Khlaled Atassi was also a poet and an author. He left several books in the topic of Islamic jurisdiction. His most famous work was "Sharh Al-Majallah", which is an interpretation of the Ottoman Islamic Law Code based on the Hanafi Fiqh school.

Atassi died in 1908 before finishing the book, but it was later completed by his son Taher al-Atassi, also Mufti of Homs, and was published in 7 volumes.

Several of his sons and grandsons were prominent figures and assumed high offices in Mandatory Syria. His son Hashem Al-Atassi headed the struggle against the French mandate and became president of Mandatory Syria and Syrian Republic.

His son Taher Efendi took over the post of Mufti of Homs, and was elected to the Council of the Syrian States Union in 1922. Several of his grandsons became ministers in the Syrian government and deputies in the parliament.
