= Wasfi al-Atassi =

Syrian politician

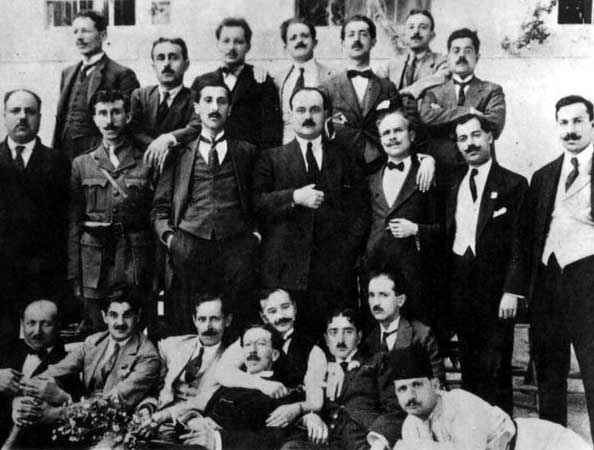
Founders of Souryah al-Fatat. Wasfi al-Atassi is the standing in the second row to the far left

Wasfi al-Atassi (1888–1933) (Arabic: وصفي الأتاسي) was a Syrian nationalist, statesman and one of the original writers of the Syrian constitution.

== Life ==
Born in Homs to the Atassi family in 1888, he was educated locally. His father, Najeeb Efendi al-Atassi was an Islamic scholar and a notable, having headed the municipality of the city of Homs in 1879. Wasfi Atassi attended the Imperial Law School of Istanbul, the capital of the Ottoman Empire. Upon graduation he returned to his home town and established a career as a lawyer.

In 1919, after the defeat of the Turks and their withdrawal from Syria, Atassi was elected to the Syrian National Congress, the first Syrian parliament. His cousin, Hashim al-Atassi, the other deputy from Homs, was chosen as chairman. On March 10, 1920 both Wasfi and Hashim al-Atassi were elected to the seven-membered constitutional committee that was charged with drafting the first Syrian constitution. Within a few days, the members of this committee were able to review several existing constitutional documents from other countries, formulate a draft, debate the articles, and present the new constitution to the congress for ratification. The constitution declared Syria an independent constitutional monarchy under King Faisal, and recognized no foreign claims in the country or international treaties that would jeopardize its independence. Wasfi Atassi was also a member of the three-membered congressional committee which chose the current building that housed the parliament in Damascus. In 1920 he was installed governor of Hama by King Faisal.

Atassi took part in the struggle for independence and became a member of national movements which opposed Turkish dominance and then the French mandate. In early 1919, he founded the Arab Club (Arabic: النادي العربي) in Homs, similar to the one established in Damascus by the nationalists. Atassi was chosen head of the Club and supervised its activities, which included hosting a range of meetings, discussions, and lectures on nationalism. It also staged several plays, all of which were in frank opposition to the French influence and targeted its mandate. The French authorities closed the club down in July, 1920.

In May, 1920, he was named a founding member of the Al-Fatat (Arabic: العربية الفتاة, the anti-CUP pro-Entente organization founded in Paris in 1911) via an amendment made by the original founders to the party constitution. The Young Arab was the largest and most influential Arab party in the late Ottoman period and early independent era. He became an influential figure in the Syrian revolts against the French. In 1920 Atassi took part in establishing The Homs Defense Committee, headed by his cousin Omar al-Atassi. The committee organized armed clashes between the people of Homs and the French troops. He was charged with providing the necessary financial support through donations from both public and governmental agencies. Between 1919 and 1925 he was delegated by the nationalists of Homs to represent them in meetings with the influential families and tribes of the area, such as the Azms, Keilanis and Barazis of Hama, the Suweidans of Hisyah, the Dandachis of Talkalakh, and the Ahsenah tribe. These meetings were held to discuss the struggle for independence and were a prelude to the Syrian Revolution of 1925. He became one of the brains behind the uprisings of the two sister cities of Homs and Hama. In 1925 he joined the Peoples' Party of Abd al-Rahman Shahbandar, along with Shukri al-Jundi, Mazhar Raslan, Shafiq al-Husseini, and Abdul-Kareem al-Droubi, and established a chapter in Homs.

The French struck back. In 1926 Atassi was one of the national leaders exiled to the Island of Arwad for two months (January 23 – March 26), along with his cousins Hashim al-Atassi, Mazhar al-Atassi, as well as Faris al-Khoury, Saadallah al-Jabiri, Mazhar Raslan, Shukry Al-Jindi, and others. Returning from exile, Atassi joined the National Bloc that was formed by the major political figures of Syria and Lebanon at that time, and lead the struggle against the French for the next two decades until establishing independence in 1946. In 1928 he was one of the members of the National Block who signed a pact announcing their participation in congressional elections; however, he stepped down in favor of his cousin, Hashem al-Atassi, to ensure unity.

Wasfi al-Atassi died in 1933. He was unable to see the final struggle for independence reap its fruits.
