= Mezzeh prison =

Syrian prison closed in 2000

Coordinates: 33°30′34″N 36°15′5″E

Mezzeh prison (Arabic: سجن المزة) is a now-defunct Syrian prison overlooking the capital, Damascus operated by Ba'athist Syria. Mezzeh (also transcribed as al-Mazzah, el-Mezze etc.) is the name of a neighborhood in western Damascus.

Both military and political prisoners were held at Mezzeh prison. The prison was an infamous embodiment of Syrian government repression. Widespread human rights abuses and torture has been reported from the Mezzeh prison throughout its history but most notably during the rule of Hafez al-Assad (1971–2000).

== History ==
The hilltop structure dates back to crusader days. During the Mandate for Syria and the Lebanon, the French rebuilt it in 1920s and used Mezzeh to house anti-colonial fighters and political prisoners. However, only in 1949, after the first Syrian coup d'état, did the prison take on a central importance for Syrian political life, when coup leader Husni al-Za'im imprisoned his predecessor in Mezzeh only to follow three and half months later when he was himself overthrown. Since then, Syrian leaders deposed in the many coups of the country have almost routinely been sent to Mezzeh prison, and it has held many political prisoners.

Mezzeh prison was closed on the orders of Syrian president Bashar al-Assad in September 2000, and about 600 prisoners released.

== See also ==
- Adra Prison
- Tadmor Prison
