= United Nations Assistance Mission =

United Nations Assistance Mission may refer to:

- United Nations Assistance Mission in Afghanistan (UNAMA), established 28 March 2002
- United Nations Assistance Mission for Iraq (UNAMI), established 14 August 2003
- United Nations Assistance Mission for Rwanda (UNAMIR), established 5 October 1993
- United Nations Assistance Mission in Somalia (UNSOM), established 3 June 2013
- United Nations Integrated Transition Assistance Mission in Sudan (UNITAMS), established 3 June 2020

== See also ==
- United Nations Department of Political and Peacebuilding Affairs
- List of United Nations peacekeeping missions
