= 1999 Syrian presidential election =

- 10 February 1999
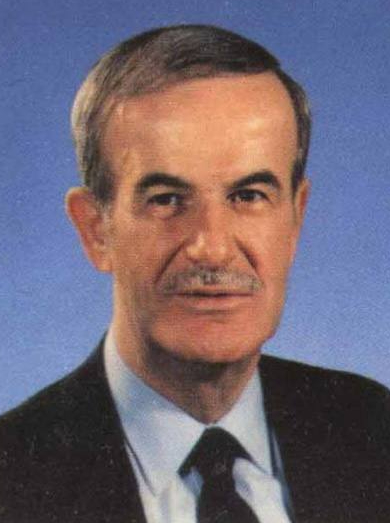
Nominee	Hafez al-Assad
Party	Ba'ath Party
Alliance	NPF
Popular vote	8,960,011
Percentage	99.998%
- Results by governorate Assad: 90–100% Election not held

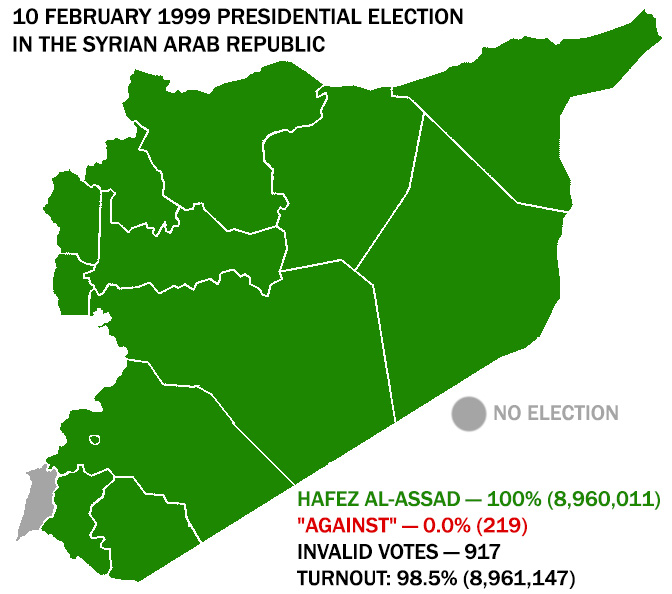
- Another variant of the presidential election 1999 results, which includes "against" and "invalid votes".
President before election
Hafez al-Assad
Ba'ath Party
Elected President
Hafez al-Assad
Ba'ath Party

Presidential elections were held in Syria on 10 February 1999. There was only one candidate, incumbent president Hafez al-Assad, with voters asked to approve or reject his candidacy. A reported 99.998% of voters voted in favour with a turnout of 98.5%. Assad was re-elected for another seven-year term. However, he died in June 2000, resulting in an early presidential election that year.

== Results ==
Candidate	Party	Votes	%
Hafez al-Assad	Ba'ath Party	8,960,011	99.9976%
Against		219	0.0024%
Total		8,960,230	100.00%
Valid votes		8,960,230	99.99%
Invalid/blank votes		917	0.01%
Total votes		8,961,147	100.00%
Registered voters/turnout		9,101,000	98.46%
Source: Nohlen et al.
