= Arab Socialist Ba'ath Party – Syria Region =

Neo-Ba'athist political party

Arab Socialist Ba'ath Party – Syria Region حزب البعث العربي الاشتراكي – قطر سوريا
- Governing body: Central Command (2018–2024)
- Founded: 7 April 1947; 79 years ago
- Dissolved: 29 January 2025; 21 months ago
- Newspaper: Al-Ba'ath and Al-Thawra (until 2024)
- Student wing: National Union of Students; Ba'ath Vanguards
- Youth wing: Revolutionary Youth Union
- Armed wing: Ba'ath Brigades (2012–2018)
- Membership: 1.200.000 (2010 est.)
- Ideology: Neo-Ba'athism: Assadism; Arab nationalism; Economic liberalism/Neoliberalism (from 1990s); Left-wing nationalism; Militarism; Secularism; Syrian nationalism; Syrian irredentism; Anti-imperialism; Anti-Zionism; Historical: Revolutionary socialism (1966–1970); Pan-Arabism (until 1970); Arab socialism (until 1991); Authoritarian socialism (until 1991)
- Political position: Far-left
- International affiliation: For the Freedom of Nations! (2024)
- Popular front: National Progressive Front (1972–2024)
- Regional affiliation: Arab Socialist Ba'ath Party (1966–2024); PSOM (historical)
- Colors: Black White Green; Red (Pan-Arab colors)
- Slogan: Unity, Freedom, Socialism; Long Live The Arabs

Party flag

Website
- baathparty.sy (Now Defunct)

The Arab Socialist Ba'ath Party – Syria Region (Arabic: حزب البعث العربي الاشتراكي – قطر سوريا Ḥizb al-Ba'th al-'Arabī al-Ishtirākī – Quṭr Sūriyā), officially the Syrian Regional Branch (Arabic: الفرع القطري السوري), was a Ba'athist organisation founded on 7 April 1947 by Michel Aflaq, Salah al-Din al-Bitar and followers of Zaki al-Arsuzi. The party ruled Syria from the 1963 coup d'état, which brought the Ba'athists to power, until 8 December 2024, when Bashar al-Assad fled Damascus in the face of a rebel offensive which concluded the Syrian civil war. It was formally disbanded in January 2025.

The party was founded on 7 April 1947 as the Arab Ba'ath Party through the merger of the Arab Ba'ath Movement led by Michel ʿAflaq and Salah al-Din al-Bitar and the Arab Ba'ath, led by Zaki al-Arsuzi. The party espoused Ba'athism, an ideology mixing Arab nationalist, pan-Arab, Arab socialist, and anti-imperialist interests. Ba'athism calls for the unification of the Arab world into a single state. It quickly established branches in other Arab countries, although it would only hold power in Syria and in Iraq. Following their ascent to power in 1963, neo-Ba'athist officers proceeded to stamp out the traditional civilian elites in order to construct a military dictatorship operating on totalitarian (Note: Sources: Wieland, Carsten (2018). "6: De-neutralizing Aid: All Roads Lead to Damascus". Syria and the Neutrality Trap: The Dilemmas of Delivering Humanitarian Aid Through Violent Regimes. London: I. B. Tauris. p. 68. ISBN 978-0-7556-4138-3.; Keegan, John (1979). "Syria". World Armies. New York, USA: Facts on File Inc. pp. 683–684. ISBN 0-87196-407-4.; Meininghaus, Esther (2016). "Introduction". Creating Consent in Ba'thist Syria: Women and Welfare in a Totalitarian State. I. B. Tauris. pp. 1–33. ISBN 978-1-78453-115-7.) lines; wherein all state agencies, party organisations, public institutions, civil entities, media and health infrastructure were tightly dominated by the military establishment and the Mukhabarat (intelligence services).

The 1966 coup d'état carried out by the radical left-wing faction of Salah Jadid and Hafez al-Assad ousted the Old Guard of Ba'ath leadership consisting of Aflaq and Bitar; and dissolved the National Command of the united Ba'ath Party. The leftist faction of the Syrian Ba'ath advanced a strictly socialist economic programme, pursued a closer alliance with the Syrian communists, "progressive" Arab states and the Soviet Bloc, and prioritised the spread of socialist revolution in the neighbouring "reactionary" Arab states over pan-Arab unity. The official ideology preached by the Syrian Ba'ath is known as neo-Ba'athism, a school of Ba'athist thought that denounces Aflaq and Bitar and eulogizes Alawite philosopher Arsuzi as its leading theoretician.

In another coup in 1970, officially dubbed the "Corrective Revolution", Hafez al-Assad would overthrow the Jadid faction and tone down the revolutionary measures. The new regime emphasized building socialism in Syria first and was open to alliances with neighbouring countries. From this period, the party adopted Assadism as its official ideology, promoting a personality cult centred around the Assad dynasty.

Following the fall of the Assad regime on 8 December 2024, on 11 December, the party suspended all activities "until further notice" and transferred its assets to the Syrian caretaker government. On 29 January 2025, the party was formally dissolved by the Syrian caretaker government during the Syrian Revolution Victory Conference.

== History ==
=== Founding and early years: 1947–1963 ===
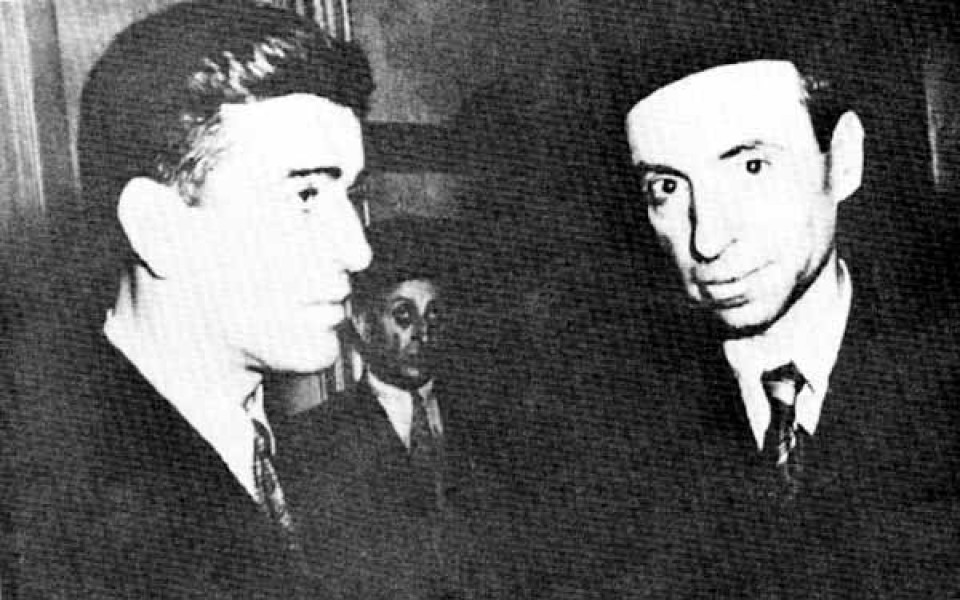
Akram al-Hawrani (left) with Michel Aflaq as seen in 1957

The Ba'ath Party, and indirectly the Syrian Regional Branch, was established on 7 April 1947 by Michel Aflaq (a Christian), Salah al-Din al-Bitar (a Sunni Muslim) and Zaki al-Arsuzi (an Alawite). According to the congress, the party was "nationalist, populist, socialist, and revolutionary" and believed in the "unity and freedom of the Arab nation within its homeland." The party opposed the theory of class conflict, but supported the nationalisation of major industries, the unionisation of workers, land reform, and supported private inheritance and private property rights to some degree. The party merged with the Arab Socialist Party (ASP), led by Akram al-Hawrani, to establish the Arab Socialist Ba'ath Party in Lebanon following Adib Shishakli's rise to power. Most ASP members did not adhere to the merger and remained, according to George Alan, "passionately loyal to Hawrani's person." The merger was weak, and a lot of the ASP's original infrastructure remained intact. In 1955, the party decided to support Gamal Abdel Nasser and what they perceived as his pan-Arabist policies.

Syrian politics took a dramatic turn in 1954 when the military government of Adib al-Shishakli was overthrown and the democratic system restored. The Ba'ath, now a large and popular organisation, won 22 out of 142 parliamentary seats in the Syrian election that year, becoming the second-largest party in parliament. The Ba'ath Party was supported by the intelligentsia because of their pro-Egyptian and anti-imperialist stance and their support for social reform.

The assassination of Ba'athist colonel Adnan al-Malki by a member of the Syrian Social Nationalist Party (SSNP) in April 1955 allowed the Ba'ath Party and its allies to launch a crackdown, thus eliminating one rival. In 1957, the Ba'ath Party partnered with the Syrian Communist Party (SCP) to weaken the power of Syria's conservative parties. By the end of that year, the SCP weakened the Ba'ath Party to such an extent that in December the Ba'ath Party drafted a bill calling for a union with Egypt, a move that was very popular. The union between Egypt and Syria went ahead and the United Arab Republic (UAR) was created, and the Ba'ath Party was banned in the UAR because of Nasser's hostility to parties other than his own. The Ba'ath leadership dissolved the party in 1958, gambling that the legalisation against certain parties would hurt the SCP more than it would the Ba'ath. A military coup in Damascus in 1961 brought the UAR to an end. Sixteen prominent politicians, including al-Hawrani and Salah al-Din al-Bitar – who later retracted his signature, signed a statement supporting the coup. The Ba'athists won several seats during the 1961 parliamentary election.

=== Coup of 1963 ===
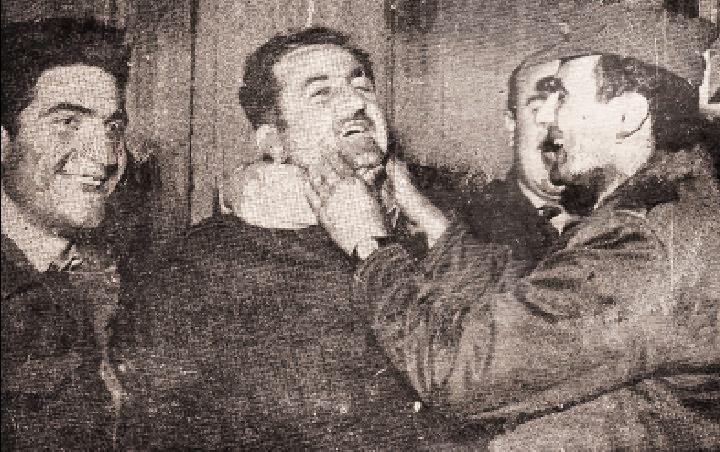
Military Committee members Salim Hatum (left), Muhammad Umran (center) and Salah Jadid (right) celebrating after the 1963 coup d'état

The military group preparing for the overthrow of the separatist regime in February 1963 was composed of independent Nasserite and other unionist, including Ba'athist officers. The re-emergence of the Ba'ath as a majority political force aided in the coup; without a political majority the coup would have remained a military takeover. Ziyad al-Hariri controlled the sizable forces stationed at the Israeli Front, not far from Damascus, Muhammad as-Sufi commanded the key brigade stationes in Homs, and Ghassan Haddad, one of Hariri's independent partners, commanded the Desert Forces. Early in March it was decided the coup would be brought into action on 9 March. But on 5 March several of the officers wanted to delay the coup in hope of staging a bloodless coup. It was presumed that the Nasserites were preparing a coup of their own which effectively canceled the delay. The coup began at night and by the morning of 8 March it was evident that a new political era had begun in Syria.

=== Ruling party: 1963–1970 ===
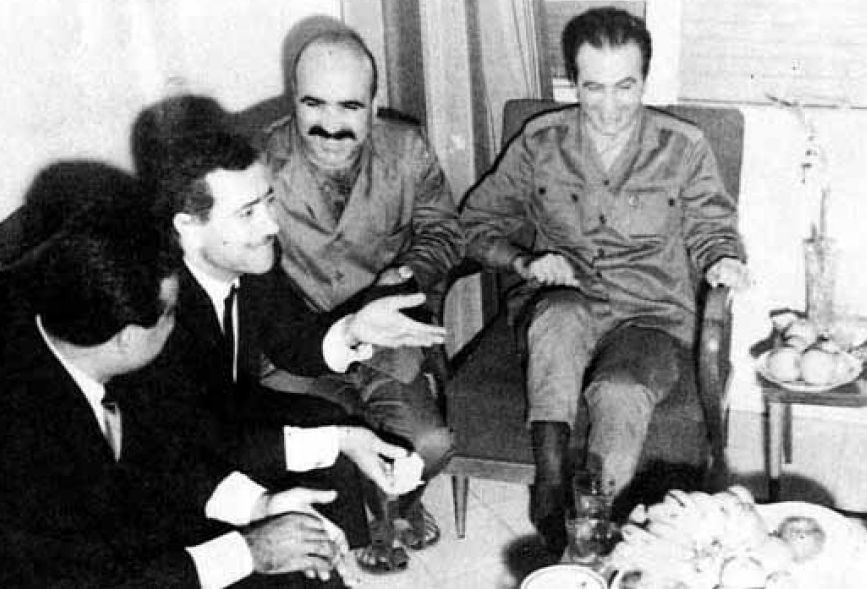
Photograph of a meeting of Senior leadership of the Baath Party in 1969 / From left to right: Interior Minister Mohammad Rabah al-Tawil, Chief of Staff General Mustafa Tlass, Commander of the Golan Front Ahmad al-Meer, and the Syrian strongman Salah Jadid

The secession from the UAR was a time of crisis for the party; several groups, including Hawrani, left the Ba'ath Party. In 1962, Aflaq convened a congress which re-established the Syrian Regional Branch. The division in the original Ba'ath Party between the National Command led by Michel Aflaq and the "regionalists" in the Syrian Regional Branch stemmed from the break-up of the UAR. Aflaq had sought to control the regionalist elements – an incoherent grouping led by Fa'iz al-Jasim, Yusuf Zuayyin, Munir al-Abdallah and Ibrahim Makhus. Aflaq retained the support of the majority of the non-Syrian National Command members (13 at the time).

Following the success of the February 1963 coup d'état in Iraq, led by the Ba'ath Party's Iraqi Regional Branch, the Military Committee hastily convened to plan a coup against Nazim al-Kudsi's presidency. The coup – dubbed the 8 March Revolution – was successful and a Ba'athist government was installed in Syria. The plotters' first order was to establish the National Council of the Revolutionary Command (NCRC), which consisted entirely of Ba'athists and Nasserists, and was controlled by military personnel rather than civilians. However, in its first years in power, the Syrian Regional Branch experienced an internal power struggle between traditional Ba'athists, radical socialists and the members of the Military Committee. The Nasserist and Muslim Brotherhood opposition joined forces to raise the spectre of communist takeover of Syria during the 1960s. They attacked the Ba'ath party as being anti-Sunni and condemned the state secularism of the regime as being anti-religious and atheist. Nasser himself proscribed the Syrian Ba'ath for its militant secularism and the radical Marxist proposals of its leaders. The first period of Ba'ath rule was put to an end with the 1966 Syrian coup d'état, which overthrew the traditional Ba'athists led by Aflaq and Bitar and brought Salah Jadid, the head of the Military Committee, to power (though not formally).

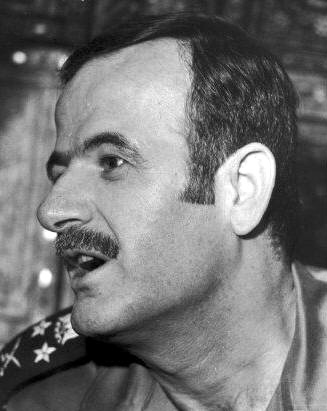
Photo of Syrian military general Hafez al-Assad during the 1970 coup

=== 1970 Coup ===
After the 1967 Six-Day War, tensions between Jadid and Hafez al-Assad increased, and al-Assad and his associates were strengthened by their hold on the military. In late 1968, they began dismantling Jadid's support network, facing ineffectual resistance from the civilian branch of the party that remained under Jadid's control. This duality of power persisted until the Corrective Revolution of November 1970, when al-Assad ousted and imprisoned Atassi and Jadid. He then set upon a project of rapid institution-building, reopened parliament and adopted a permanent constitution for the country, which had been ruled by military fiat and a provisional constitutional documents since 1963. Assad significantly modified his predecessor's radical socialist economic policies, encouraged several wealthy urban families to increase their activities in the private sector, and allowed limited foreign investment from Arab countries in the Persian Gulf region States.

=== Reign of the Assads (1970–2024) ===
==== Hafez al-Assad (1970–2000) ====
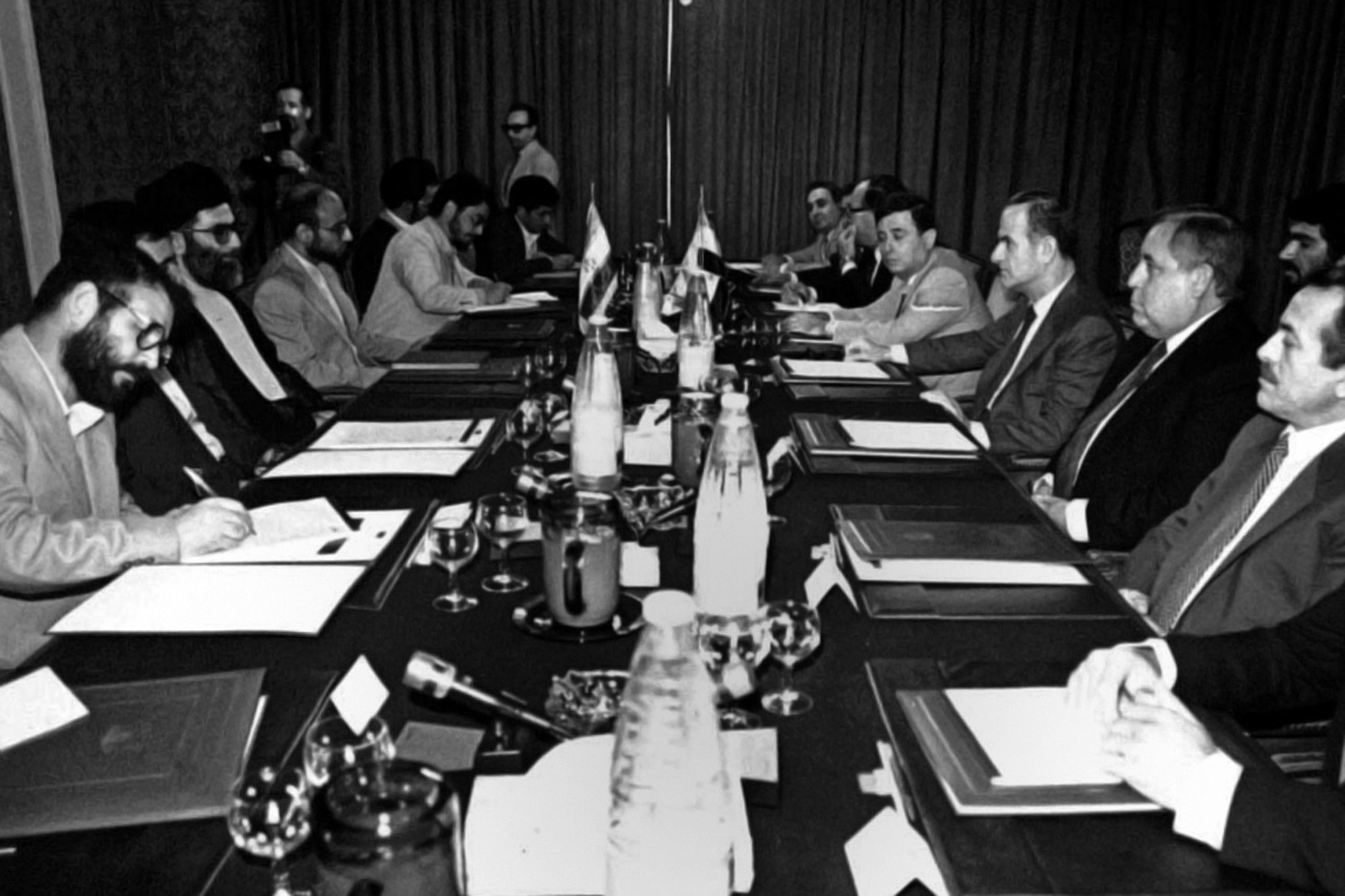
Meeting of Hafez Al-Assad and then Iranian president Ali Khamenei in Damascus, 6 September 1984. During the 1980s, as the grip of his Alawite loyalists in the Ba'ath party tightened, Assad pursued close alliance with the Shi'ite theocracy of Iran.

Hafez Al-Assad's reign was marked by the virtual abandonment of Pan-Arab ideology; replacing it with the doctrine of socialist transformation and giving overriding priority in constructing socialist society within Syria. Political participation was limited to the National Progressive Front, the ruling coalition of Syrian Ba'ath and Marxist–Leninist parties; entrenching itself firmly within the Soviet Bloc. The Party also began building a personality cult around Assad and brought the elite of the armed forces under Assad's grip and the officer corps were installed with Alawite loyalists; further alienating the Sunni majority from the party.

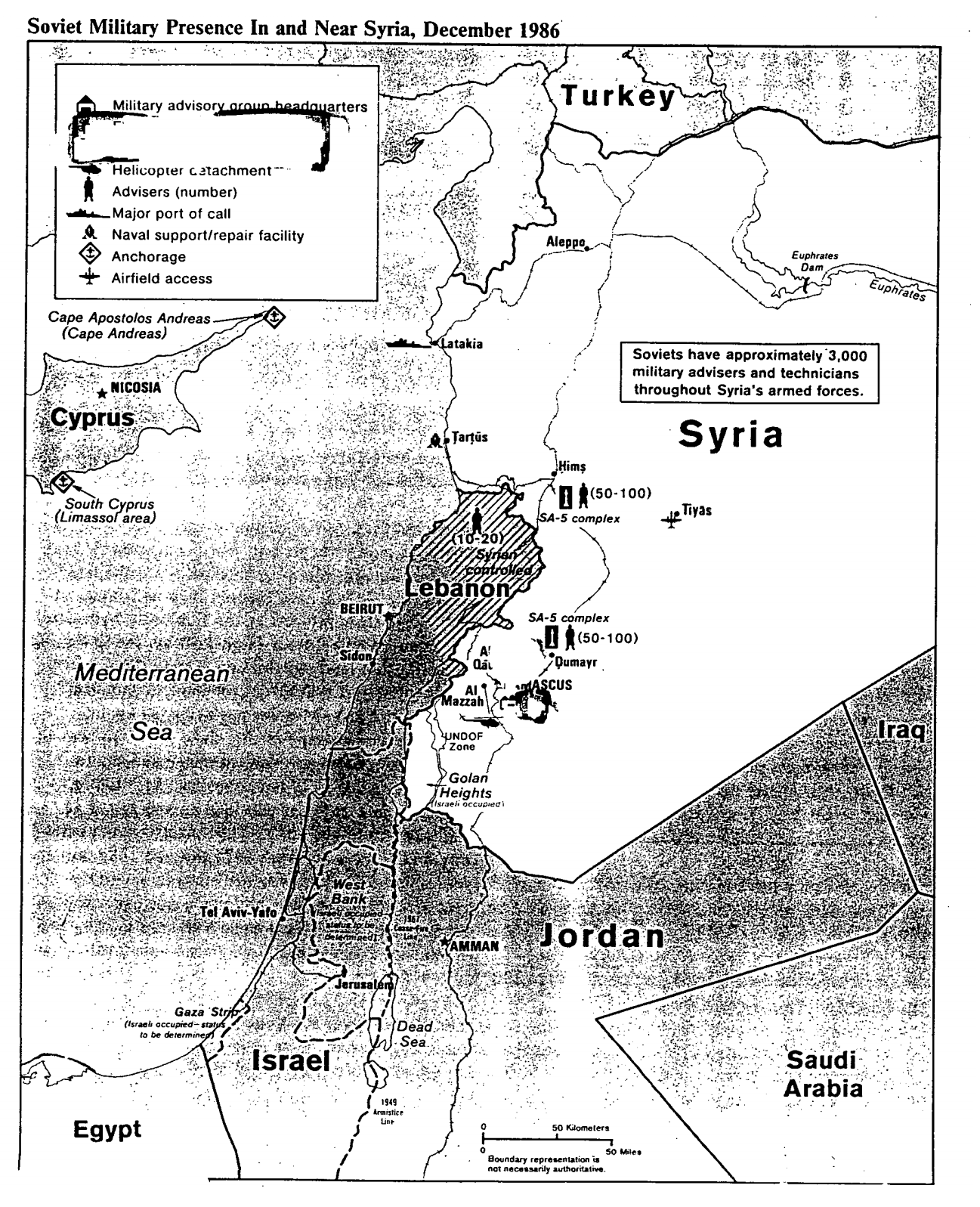
Soviet Military Presence in Syria and Lebanon, December 1986

By the late 1970s, the state apparatus of the Ba'ath regime under Assad had consolidated into an anti-Sunni orientation. Official propaganda incited Alawite farmers against rich Sunni landowners and regularly disseminated stereotypes of Sunni merchants and industrialists, casting them as enemies of nationalisation and socialist revolution. Bitterness towards the Assadist regime and the Alawite elite in the Ba'ath and armed forces became widespread amongst the Sunni majority, laying the beginnings of an Islamic resistance. Prominent leaders of Muslim Brotherhood like Issam al-Attar were imprisoned and exiled. A coalition of the traditional Syrian Sunni ulema, Muslim Brotherhood revolutionaries and Islamist activists formed the Syrian Islamic Front in 1980 with objective of overthrowing Assad through Jihad and establishing an Islamic state. In the same year, Hafez officially supported Iran in its war with Iraq and controversially began importing Iranian fighters and terror groups into Lebanon and Syria. This led to rising social tensions within the country which eventually became a full-fledged rebellion in 1982; led by the Islamic Front. The regime responded by slaughtering the Sunni inhabitants in Hama and Aleppo and bombarding numerous mosques, killing around 20,000–40,000 civilians. The uprising was brutally crushed and Assad regarded the Muslim Brotherhood as demolished.

Syria under Hafez al-Assad was a staunch Soviet ally and firmly aligned itself with Soviet Bloc during the height of the Cold War. Soviet Union saw Syria as the lynchpin of its Middle-East strategy and signed the Treaty of Friendship and Co-operation in 1980; directly committing itself to Syria's defense and incorporating the Syrian armed forces into Soviet standards. For his part, Hafez committed himself to socialist economic and foreign policies; and was one of the few autocrats to openly support the Soviet invasion of Afghanistan. The end of the Cold War and collapse of the Soviet Union dealt a deep blow to Assad, who retained the nostalgia for the old order. Assad continued to rule Syria until his death in 2000, by centralizing powers in the state presidency.

==== Bashar al-Assad (2000–2024) ====
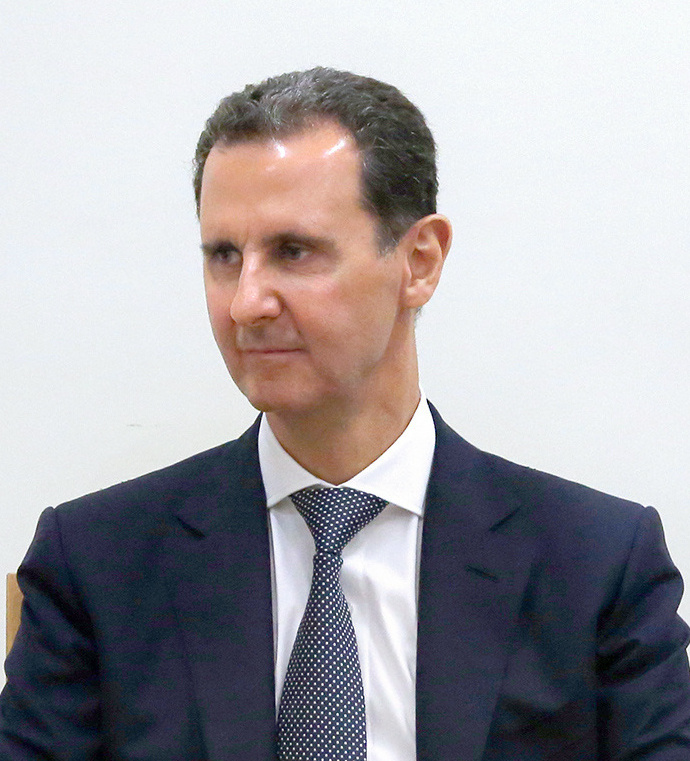
Bashar al-Assad, the Secretary-General of the Syrian Regional Branch and state president

Hafez's son Bashar al-Assad succeeded him in office as President of Syria and Regional Secretary of the Syrian Regional Branch on 17 July and 24 June respectively. State propaganda portrayed the new president as the symbol of "modernity, youth, and openness". At the beginning, Bashar al-Assad's rule was met with high expectations, with many foreign commentators believing he would introduce reforms reminiscent of the Chinese economic reforms or the perestroika of Mikhail Gorbachev. A brief period of political and cultural opening known as Damascus Spring was stamped out during 2001–2002, when numerous intellectuals, activists and dissidents, were arrested or exiled, under the guise of "national unity". Image of Assad as a moderniser also vanished; when economic measures resulted in the concentration of wealth under loyalist oligarchs, heightened systematic corruption and increased poverty levels amongst the urban middle classes and villagers.

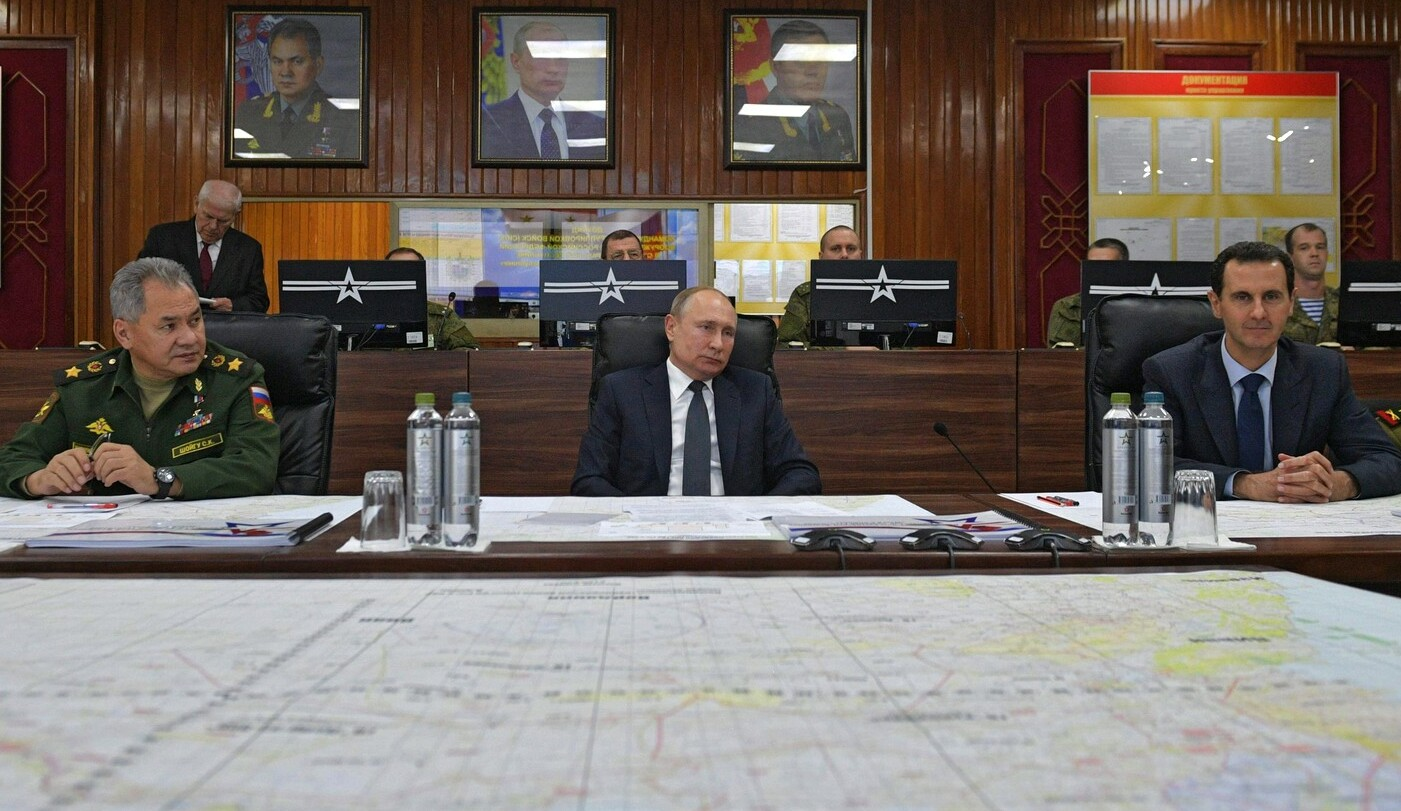
Vladimir Putin (centre), sitting alongside Bashar al-Assad (right) and Russian defense minister Sergei Shoigu (left), hearing military reports during his visit to the command post of the Russian Armed Forces in Syria.

Bashar al-Assad's rule was believed to be stable until the Arab Spring took place; the revolutions occurring in other parts of the Arab world acted as an inspiration for the Syrian opposition, leading to the 2011 Syrian revolution which escalated into a civil war. The Syrian Regional Branch has demonstrated absolute loyalty to Bashar al-Assad in its entirety throughout the civil war, from organising counter-demonstrations to forming paramilitary units focused on violently crushing peaceful demonstrators of the Syrian Revolution. It is generally believed that the plays a minor role in the conflict, having been reduced to a mass organization, and real decision-making taking place either in the military, the Assad family or Bashar al-Assad's inner circle. Despite this, the party remained loyal to the government almost in its entirety throughout the civil war, probably out of concerns that the overthrow of the Assad family's rule would result in its own demise as well. Several militias were formed by Ba'ath Party volunteers to fight against insurgents, with the most notable being the Ba'ath Brigades. The civil war also resulted in a referendum on a new constitution on 26 February 2012. The constitution was approved by the populace, and the article stating that Ba'ath Party was "the leading party of society and state" was removed and the constitution was ratified on 27 February.

Another aspect of Assad's tenure was the restoration of close alliance with Russia, the successor state of former Soviet Union. As protests erupted in 2011 as part of the Arab Spring and later proiliferated into a Civil War; Russia became the sole member to safeguard Assad in the UN Security Council. In September 2015; Vladimir Putin ordered a direct Russian military operation in Syria on behalf of Assad; providing the regime with training, volunteers, supplies and weaponry; and has since engaged in extensive aerial bombardment campaigns throughout the country targeting anti-Assad rebels.

Between 2018 and 2024, the government enacted an extensive Ba'athification campaign in its territories, amalgamating the state-party nexus and further entrenching its one-party rule. During the 2018 local elections and 2020 parliamentary elections, more hardline Ba'athist loyalists were appointed to commanding roles while other satellite parties in the National Progressive Front had been curtailed. Ba'athist candidates were fielded uncontested in many regions. The party itself was structurally overhauled, re-invigorating neo-Ba'athist ideology in organizational levels, and cadres accused of lacking ideological dedication were purged. The party portrayed itself as the vanguard of the Syrian nation and had tightened its monopoly on youth organisations, student activism, trade unions, agricultural organisations and other civil society groups.

On 8 December 2024, the Syrian Arab Republic under Assad collapsed amid major offensives by the Syrian opposition led by Hayat Tahrir al-Sham. The fall of Damascus marked the end of the regime of the al-Assad family. Assad fled Damascus by plane.

=== Post-Assad era ===
Following the fall of the Assad regime, the Ba'ath's Central Command published a statement on the party's newspaper Al-Ba'ath, announcing the party's intention to cooperate with the Syrian transitional government, which is currently being led by members of Hayat Tahrir al-Sham, in order to "defend the unity of the country, land, people, institutions and capabilities". It also called for reforms to provide for political pluralism and separation of powers. Two days later, an internal statement on December 11 was circulated among members and published on Al-Ba'ath which announced the suspension of all party activities "until further notice" and the handover of all vehicles and weapons belonging to the party to the Ministry of Interior as well as all party funds to the Ministry of Finance, with the property's proceeds going towards the Central Bank of Syria so as to be spent by the transitional government "according to the law"; the Al-Sham Private University was also announced to be placed under the supervision of the Ministry of Higher Education while all other party assets were to be transferred to the Ministry of Justice, including the former headquarters of the party, where it was turned into a settlement center for former members of the army and security forces who served under Assad.

On 20 January 2025, the building that housed the headquarters of a local branch of the party in Suwayda was transferred to a local branch of Damascus University by the Syrian transitional government.

On 29 January 2025, the party was formally dissolved by the newly declared president of the Syrian transitional government, Ahmed al-Sharaa, along with the 2012 constitution, the People's Assembly, the Syrian Arab Armed Forces, and the security services affiliated with the deposed regime.

== Organization ==
=== General Congress ===
The General Congress was supposed to be held every fourth year to elect members of the Central Command. Since 1980, its functions have been eclipsed by the Central Committee, which was empowered to elect the Central Command. By 1985's 8th Regional Congress, the Command Secretary was empowered to elect the Central Committee. The 8th Regional Congress would be the last congress held under Hafez al-Assad's rule. The next Regional Congress was held in June 2000 and elected Bashar al-Assad as Command Secretary and elected him as a candidate for the next presidential election.

Delegates to the General Congress were elected beforehand by the Central Command leadership. While all delegates came from the party's local organisation, they was forced to elect members presented by the leadership. However, some criticism was allowed. At the 8th Regional Congress, several delegates openly criticised the growing political corruption and the economic stagnation in Syria. They could also discuss important problems to the Central Command, which in turn could deal with them.

Regional Congresses before the Regional Branch's dissolution in 1958

- 1st Regional Congress (March 1954)
- 2nd Regional Congress (March 1955)
- 3rd Regional Congress (9–12 July 1957)

Regional Congresses held after the Regional Branch's reestablishment

- 1st Regional Congress: 5 September 1963
- 2nd Regional Congress: 18 March – 4 April 1965
- 3rd Regional Congress: September 1966
- 4th Regional Congress: 26 September 1968
- 5th Regional Congress: 8–14 May 1971
- 6th Regional Congress: 5–15 April 1975
- 7th Regional Congress: 22 December – 7 January 1980
- 8th Regional Congress: 5–20 January 1985
- 9th Regional Congress: 17–21 June 2000
- 10th Regional Congress: 6–9 June 2005

Extraordinary Regional Congresses

- 1st Extraordinary Regional Congress: 1 February 1964
- 2nd Extraordinary Regional Congress: 1 August 1965
- 3rd Congress of the Regional Emergency: 10–13 and 20–27 March 1966
- 4th Congress of the Regional Emergency: September 1967
- 5th Regional Emergency Congress: 21–31 March 1969
- 6th Regional Congress of the Emergency: June 1974

==== Central Command ====
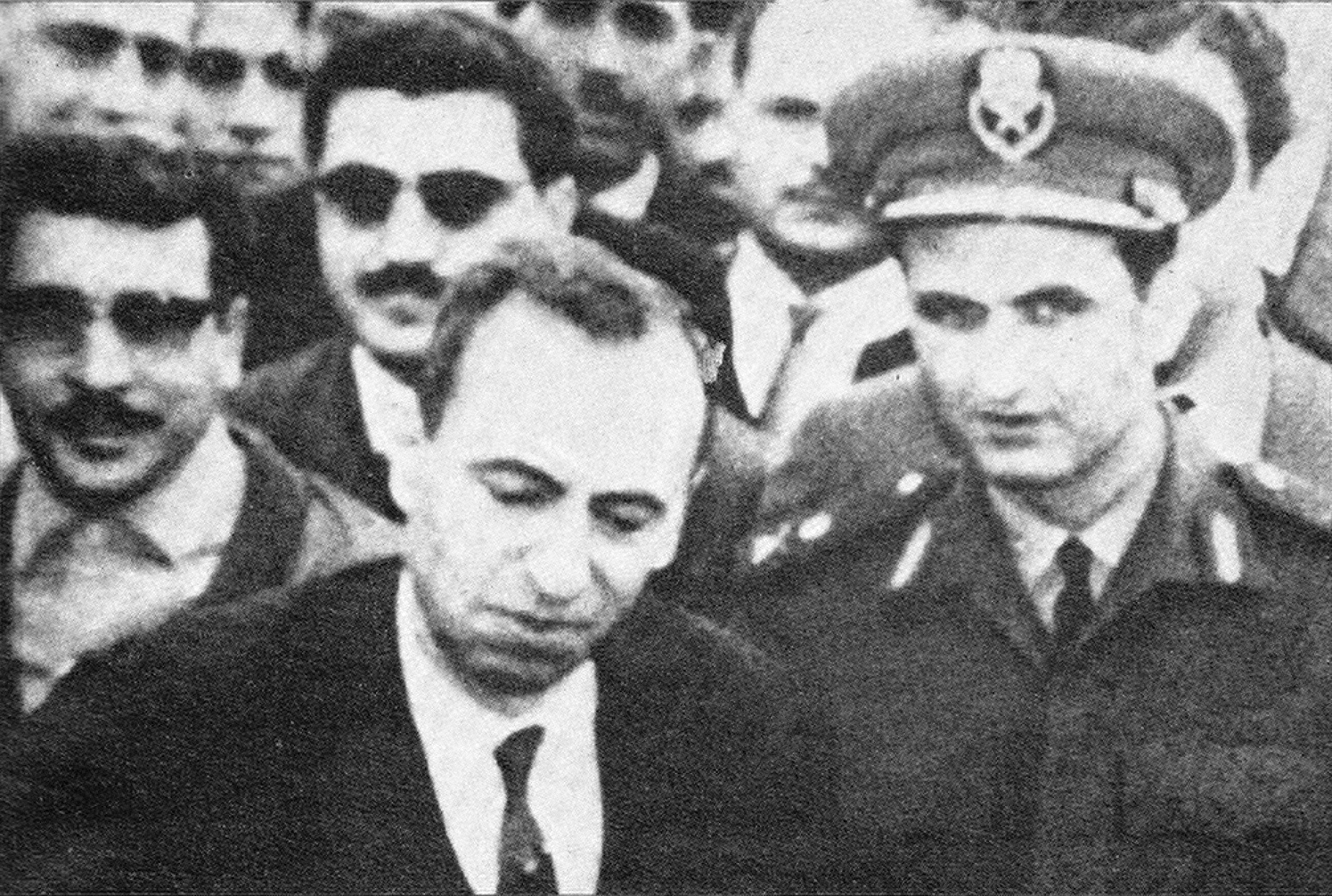
Aflaq (left) and Jadid (right), 1963.

The Central Command, according to the Syrian Constitution, had the power to nominate a candidate for president. While the constitution did not state that the Secretary of the Central Command is the President of Syria, the charter of the National Progressive Front (NPF), of which the Ba'ath Party was a member, stated that the President and the Central Command Secretary is the NPF President, but this was not stated in any legal document. The 1st Extraordinary Regional Congress held in 1964 decided that the Secretary of the Central Command would also be head of state. The Central Command was officially responsible to the General Congress.

==== Central Committee ====
The Central Committee (Arabic: Al-Lajna Al-Markaziyya), established in January 1980, was subordinate to the Central Command. It was established as a conduit for communication between the Ba'ath Party leadership and local party organs. At the 8th Regional Congress held in 1985, membership size increased from 75 to 95. Other changes was that its powers were enhanced; in theory, the Central Command became responsible to the Central Committee, the hitch was that the Central Command Secretary elected the members of the Central Committee. Another change was that the Central Committee was given the responsibilities of the Regional Congress when the congress was not in session. As with the Central Command, the Central Committee was in theory supposed to be elected every fourth year by the Regional Congress, but from 1985 until Hafez al-Assad's death in 2000, no Regional Congress was held.

=== Central-level organs ===
==== Military Bureau ====
The Military Bureau, which succeeded the Military Committee, oversaw the Syrian Armed Forces. Shortly after the 8 March Coup, the Military Committee created National Council for the Revolutionary Command (NCRC) and became the supreme authority in military affairs. The party had a parallel structure within the Syrian armed forces. The military and civilian sectors only met at the regional level, as the military sector is represented in the Central Command and sends delegates to general congresses. The military sector was divided into branches, which operated at the battalion level. The head of a military party branch was called a tawjihi, or guide.

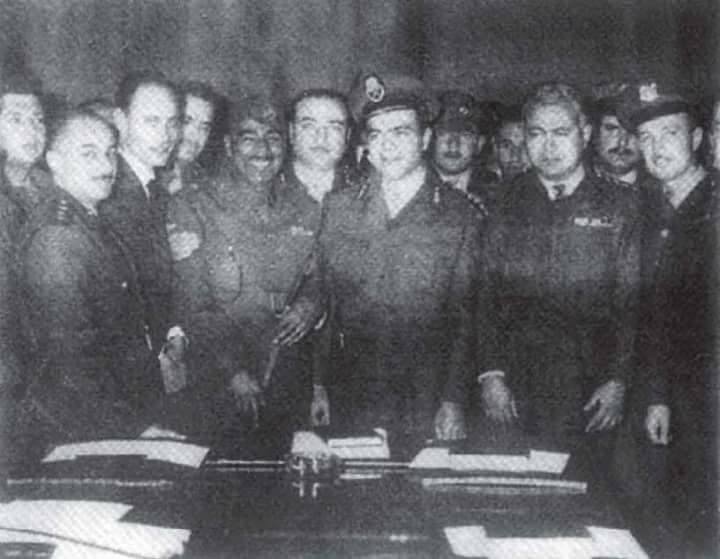
Syrian military officers, 1963.

In 1963, the Military Committee established the Military Organisation, which consisted of 12 branches resembling their civilian counterparts. The Military Organisation was led by a Central Committee, which represented the Military Committee. These new institutions were established to stop the civilian faction meddling in the affairs of the Military Committee. The Military Organisation met with the other branches through the Military Committee, which was represented at the Regional and National Congresses and Commands. The Military Organisation was a very secretive body. Members were sworn not to divulge any information about the organisation to officers who were not members in order to strengthen the Military Committee's hold on the military. In June 1964, it was decided that no new members would be admitted to the organisation. The Military Committee was built on a democratic framework, and a Military Organization Congress was held to elect the members of the Military Committee. Only one congress was ever held.

The lack of a democratic framework led to internal divisions within the Military Organisation among the rank-and-file. Tension within the organisation increased, and became apparent when Muhammad Umran was dismissed from the Military Committee. Some rank-and-file members presented a petition to the Regional Congress which called for the democratisation of the Military Organisation. The National Command, represented by Munif al-Razzaz, did not realise the importance of this petition before Salah Jadid suppressed it. The Military Committee decided to reform, and the Regional Congress passed a resolution which made the Military Organisation responsible to the Military Bureau of the Central Command, which was only responsible for military affairs.

==== Central Party School ====
Ali Diab is the current head of the Ba'ath Party's Central Party School.

=== Lower-level organizations ===
The party had 19 branches in Syria: one in each of the thirteen provinces, one in Damascus, one in Aleppo and one at each of the country's four universities. In most cases the governor of a province, police chief, mayor and other local dignitaries comprised the Branch Command. The Branch Command Secretary and other executive positions were filled by full-time party employees.

=== Members ===
Michel Aflaq and Salah al-Din al-Bitar, the two principal fathers of Ba'athist thought, saw the Ba'ath Party as a vanguard party, comparable to the Soviet Union's Communist Party, while Assad saw it as a mass organisation. In 1970 he stated, "After this day the Ba'ath will not be the party of the elect, as some has envisaged ... Syria does not belong to the Ba'athists alone."

Since 1970, membership of the Ba'ath Party in Syria expanded dramatically. In 1971, the party had 65,938 members; ten years later it stood at 374,332 and by mid-1992 it was 1,008,243. By mid-1992, over 14 percent of Syrians aged over 14 were members of the party. In 2003, the party membership stood at 1.8 million people, which is 18 percent of the population. The increase in membership was not smooth. In 1985 a party organisational report stated that thousand of members had been expelled before the 7th Regional Congress held in 1980 because of indiscipline. The report also mentioned the increased tendency of opportunism among party members. Between 1980 and 1984, 133,850 supporter-members and 3,242 full members were expelled from the party.

The increase in members has led official propaganda, and leading members of the party and state, to say that the people and the party are inseparable. Michel Kilo, a Syrian Christian dissident and human rights activist, said, "The Ba'ath does not recognize society. It consider itself [to be] society." This idea led to Ba'athist slogans and tenets being included in the Syrian constitution. In 1979, the Ba'ath Party's position was further strengthened when dual party membership became a criminal offence.

== Ideology ==
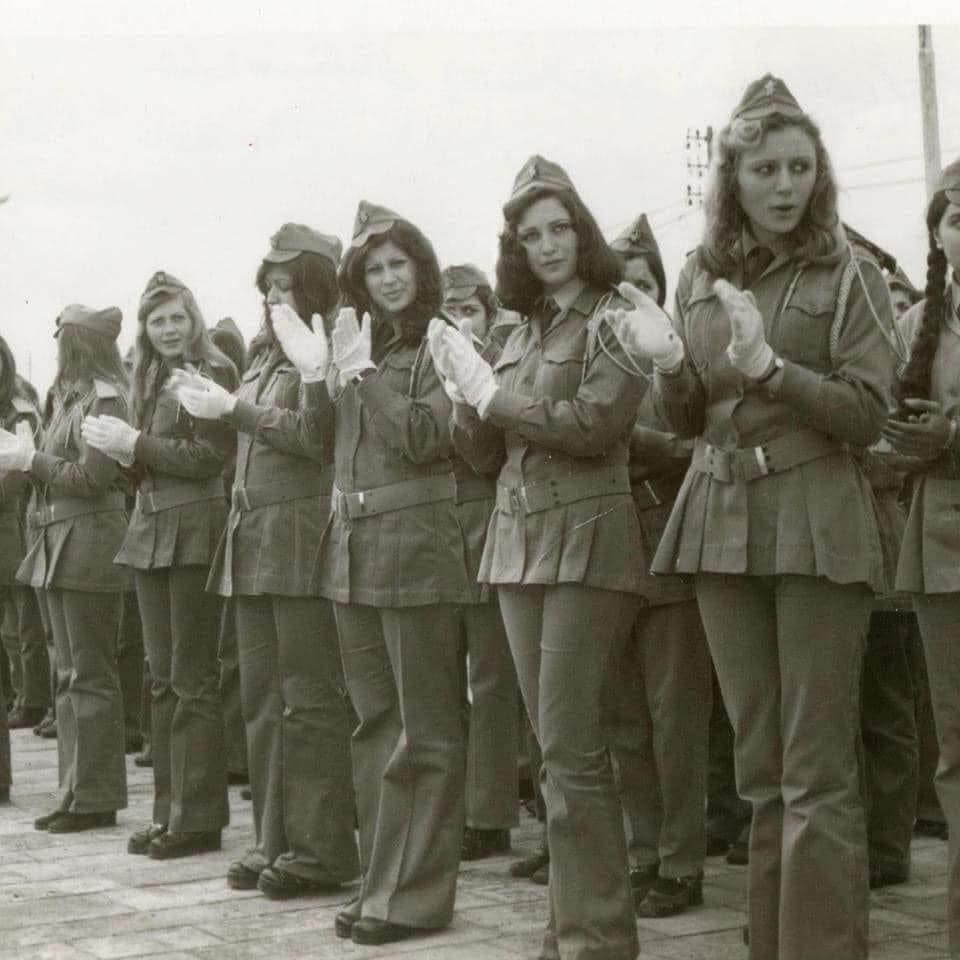
Syrian women in military uniform during a demonstration.

The original Ba'ath headed by Michel Aflaq had viewed Islam as a unique religion that shaped Arab history and society, calling for the incorporation of pan-Arabism with Islamic religious values. On other hand; the younger Neo-Ba'athists who came from minority communities like Alawites were highly influenced by communist ideals and incorporated Marxist anti-religious, economic ideas and downplayed efforts for pan-Arab unity. The Neo-Ba'athist faction that took official control of Syria following the 1966 coup were advocates of militant revolution, calling for immediate socialist transformation of society. The Soviet Union began supporting the group for its leftist programme and denounced its rival Iraqi Ba'ath as "reactionary" and "right-wing". The early years of neo-Ba'ath power was marked by militarism along with increasing sectarianism in the army and party elites. State propaganda regularly attacked religion and belief in God and young students were given compulsory military training. Big businesses, banks and large agricultural lands were all nationalised. These policies brought the Syrian Ba'athists into conflict with Arab nationalist ideologies like Nasserism, which was accused of betraying socialist ideals. Nasser, in turn, charged the Ba'ath with anti-religion and sectarianism.

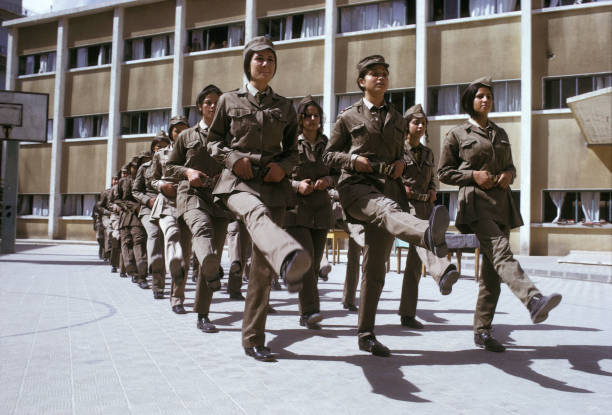
Syrian women students in military uniform, 1973.

Neo-Ba'athism advocates the creation of a "vanguard" of leftist revolutionaries committed to build an egalitarian, socialist state in Syria and other Arab countries before making steps to achieve pan-Arab unity. The vanguard organisation is the Ba'th party; which advocates class-struggle against the traditional Syrian economic elite classes; the big agriculturalists, industrialists, bourgeoisie and feudal landlords. By the 1970s, 85% of agricultural lands were distributed to landless peasant populations and tenant farmers. Banks, oil companies, power production and 90% of large-scale industries were nationalised. The neo-Ba'athists led by Salah Jadid who came to power in 1966 concentrated on improving the Syrian economy and exporting the doctrines of class-conflict and militant socialist revolution to the neighbouring countries.

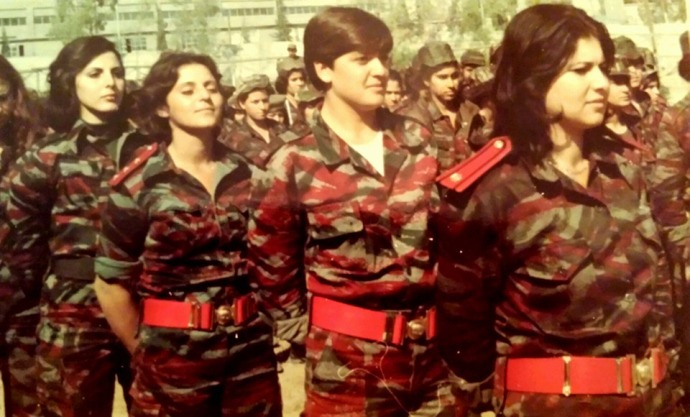
Syrian female students during a military ceremony of Revolutionary Youth Union, circa 1980.

This view was challenged by General Hafez al-Assad and his neo-Ba'ath faction; who were proponents of a military-centric approach and focused on a strategy of strengthening the Syrian military to defend the socialist government against imperialist forces and their alleged internal collaborators. Assad favoured reconciliation of various leftist factions and pursued better relations with other Arab states. Although majority of the party members favoured Salah, Hafez was able to gain the upperhand following the events of the 1970 coup dubbed the "Corrective Movement" in official Syrian Ba'ath history. Assad's victory also marked the supersedure of the military over the Ba'ath party structures; making the armed forces a central centre of political power.

=== Assadism ===
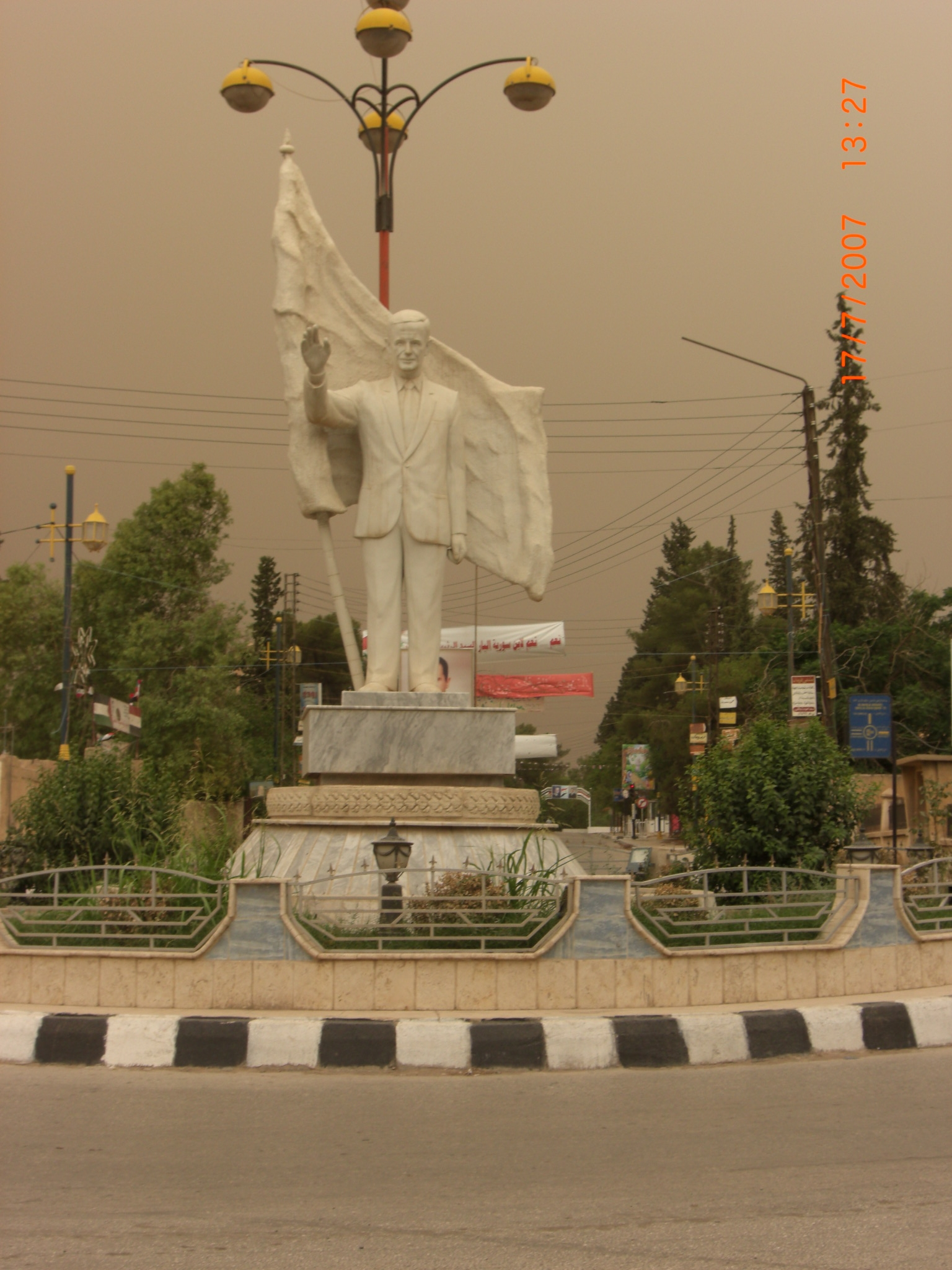
Statue of Hafez al-Assad in Qamishli

Since the end of the Cold War and fall of the Soviet Bloc in the 1990s, the official ideological paradigm of the Ba'athist dogma in Syria has been described as foundering. Despite decades of one-party rule that has lasted longer than the period of independent Syria (1946–1963); Ba'athist ideology itself has not gained popular legitimacy. The role of the party has become supplanted with the cult of personality surrounding the Assad dynasty and a consolidation of communal-based allegiances. Assad's government was a personalist system and his wisdom was portrayed as "beyond the comprehension of the average citizen". Assad deepened the Alawitization of the party and the military; reduced the role of the civilian wing of party and based his state governance structure on loyalty to the leader's family. State biography of Hafiz al-Assad describes this philosophy as "Asadiyah (Assadism)" defining it as:

"the New Ba'th led by Hafiz al‑Asad, representing a new distinctive current in Syria which has been developed by him; it is a school of thought which has benefited from Nasserism, but has surpassed it, just as it has surpassed the traditional Ba'thist school, albeit that it does not contradict either of these schools of thought but has further developed them in line with contemporary needs."

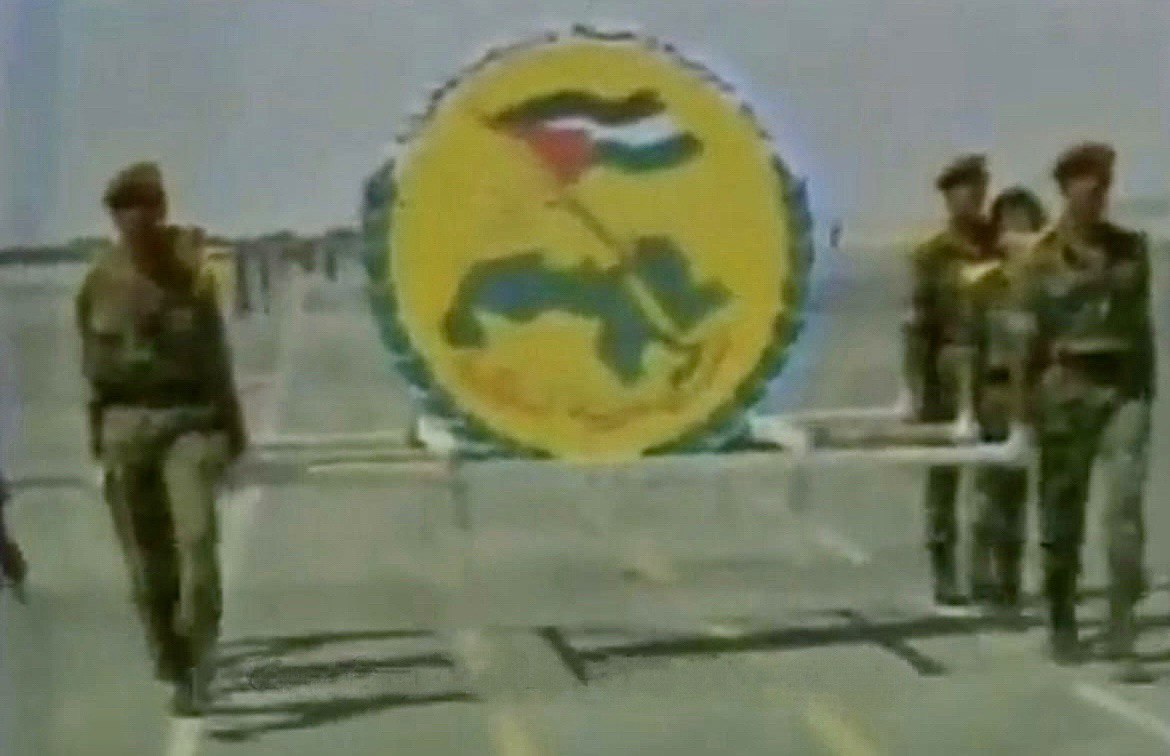
Logo of the Ba'ath party during Syrian military parade, 1990.

Assad personality cult was portrayed as integral to the prosperity and security of the nation; with Hafez al-Assad being depicted as the father figure of the Syrian nation. Ceremonies and slogans of loyalty, praise and adulation of Assads were a daily part of schools, party centres, government offices, public spaces and the military. Official state propaganda attributed Assad with supernatural abilities combined by repetitive usage of symbolism that discouraged wider society from arenas for political activism. Upon the death of Hafez al-Assad in 2000, his successor Bashar al-Assad was depicted as a reformist and youthful hope. Hafez's inner circle elite was replaced by a far more restricted faction of elites closer to Bashar, often referred to as the "New Guard". Major posts in the armed forces were awarded to Alawite loyalists, family relatives and many non-Alawite elites that served under Hafez were expelled. Another important shift was the end of the Ba'th party's practical significance; with it being reduced to a formal structure for affirming fealty to Bashar and support for his revamped crackdowns on the newly established independent civil society groups, political activists and reformist voices that arose during the Damascus Spring in the 2000s.

Describing the nature of Assadist ideological propaganda in her work Ambiguities of Domination, Professor of political science Lisa Wedeen writes:

"Asad's cult is a strategy of domination based on compliance rather than legitimacy. The regime produces compliance through enforced participation in rituals of obeisance that are transparently phony both to those who orchestrate them and to those who consume them. Asad's cult operates as a disciplinary device, generating a politics of public dissimulation in which citizens act as if they revere their leader ... It produces guidelines for acceptable; it defines and generalizes a specific type of national membership; it occasions the enforcement of obedience; it induces complicity by creating practices in which citizens are themselves "accomplices", upholding the norms constitutive of Asad's domination; it isolates Syrians from one another; and it clutters public space with monotonous slogans and empty gestures, which tire the minds and bodies of producers and consumers alike ... Asad is powerful because his regime can compel people to say the ridiculous and to avow the absurd."

=== Religion ===
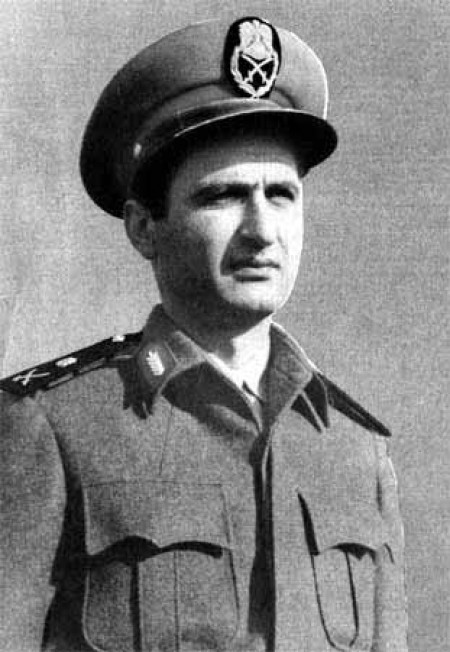
General Salah Jadid headed the most anti-religious regime in Syria since 1966 and until 1970.

Like Marxists, Syrian Ba'athist ideologues viewed religion as a tool used by traditional elites to oppress the weaker sections of the society and reinforce their conservative social order. Anti-religious propaganda has been a common ideological theme in the literature published by Syrian Ba'ath party. Militant secularism was emphasized in the "Declaration of Principles" manifesto published by the Ba'ath party in 1960; which declared that the party's "educational policy" was to build a "new generation of Arabs that believes in the unity of the nation and the eternity of its mission". The manifesto also stated that this envisaged Ba'athist generation would be "committed to scientific thought freed from the shackles of superstition and backward customs" and replace religion with Arab nationalism as their belief system. Syrian Ba'athist documents regularly depicted religion as a social institution that advanced "the values of feudalism and imperialism".

Neo-Ba'athism views religion as the "foremost symbol of reaction" preventing the birth of a modern socialist society, and advocate strict state supervision over religious activities for sustaining what its ideologues regard as a healthy, secularist society. During Salah Jadid's reign in power, the Ba'ath postured itself as a strongly anti-religious political entity; adhering to the Marxist–Leninist approach of top-down regimentation of the society through liquidation of what it regarded as "reactionary" classes such as the traditional ulema. The Grand Mufti's official status was downgraded by the Ba'athist government and the conventional role of religious clergy in state functioning was curtailed. While state ministers, officials, educators, etc. regularly preached about the "perils of religion"; party periodicals and magazines during the 1960s regularly made predictions about the "impending demise" of religion through the socialist revolution. In an article titled "The Path to Creation of the New Arab Man" published by the Syrian Arab Army magazine "People's Army" in 1967, party ideologue Ibrahim Khalas declared:

"The New Man believes that God, religions, feudalism, capitalism, imperialism and all the values that govern the ancient society are mummies that are just worth being put away in the museum of History .... We don't need a man who prays and kneels, who bows his head with baseness and begs God for pity and mercy. The New Man is a socialist, a revolutionary."

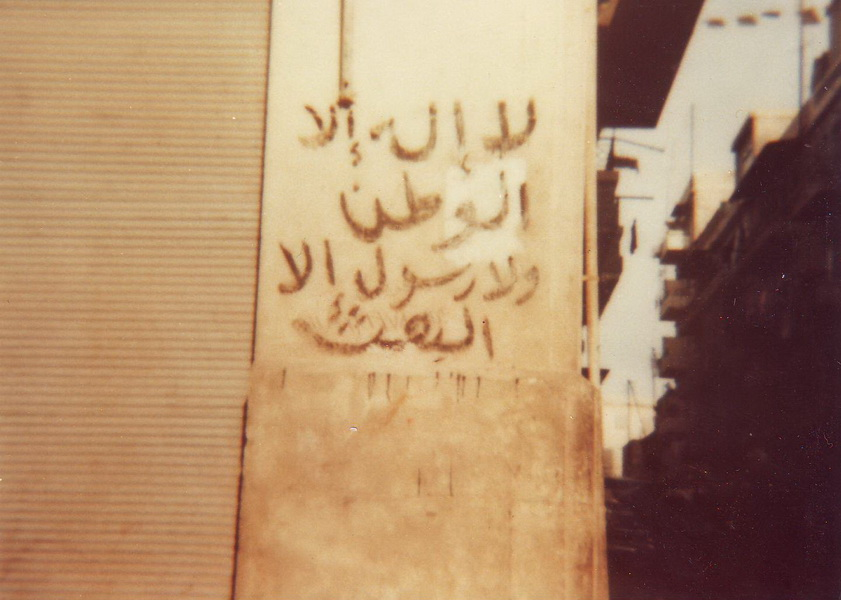
Anti-religious Ba'athist writings on the walls of Hama city following the Hama Massacre in 1982. The propaganda slogan, which translates to "There is no god but the homeland, and there is no messenger but the Ba'ath party", denigrated the Shahada (Islamic testimony of faith)

During the rule of Salah Jadid, neo-Ba'athist ideologues openly denounced religion as a source of what they considered as the backwardness of the Arabs. Following popular revulsion at Jadid's blatant anti-religious policies, Hafez al-Assad began to tone down the secularisation programme during the 1970s, by co-opting some pro-government clerics like Ramadan al-Bouti to counter the Islamic opposition and granted them a degree of autonomy from the regime. Simultaneously, the regime began the "nationalization" of religious discourse through a loyal clerical network, and condemned anyone deviating from the state-promoted Ba'thist religious ideology as a threat to the society. The state-sponsored religious discourse during the rule of Hafez al-Assad promoted a left-wing nationalist worldview that sought to anathematize Islamists and re-inforce loyalty towards the Alawite president.

The era of d'tente between the religious establishment and the Ba'athists came to an end in 2008, when Bashar al-Assad appointed Muhammad al-Sayyid as Chief of the Ministry of Awqaf, which marked an era of harsh regulations in the religious landscape. Numerous private religious educational institutes, religious charities, independent preaching organisations, female religious centres, etc. were forcibly shut down as part of the revamped state -sponsored secularization drive. The state also tightened its grip over the official religious institutions and dissident Islamic voices were imprisoned, leading to open rift with the ulema. Private religious institutes were allowed donations only after official permission from the Ministry of Awqaf, which also controlled the expenditures. The state was also entrusted with a broad range of powers including the hiring and firing of its instructors as well as the standardisation of their religious curriculum with the Ba'thist religious policy advocated by the Assad government, effectively nationalising the private religious institutes.

In 2009, Ba'ath party activists launched ideological campaigns against the Niqab (Islamic face veils) and alleged "extremist trends" in the society, which was complemented by the regime's revamped clampdown on religious activists, independent religious scholars and private schools. Popular display of religious symbols of all sects was banned in 2010 and officials close to the ulema were suspended, under the pretext of preserving the "secular character" of the country. The regime also implemented nation-wide ban on the Niqab (face-covering) and imposed restrictions on female Islamic organisations like the Al-Qubaisiat, which ignited a region-wide controversy. By the onset of Arab Spring in late 2010, relationship between the ulema and the Assad regime had sunk to its lowest level, with even staunch Assad-loyalists like the Grand Mufti Ramadan al-Bouti expressing public discontent.

With the outbreak of the Syrian civil war, regime's crackdown on religious dissidents increased, particularly those of Sunni background over allegations of sympathies with Syrian opposition groups. In November 2021, Assad abolished the office of Grand Mufti of Syria. Describing Assadism as a quasi-religion fostered by the Ba'athist state for mobilising the fealty and adulation of Syrian citizens, Professor of Middle Eastern Studies at Bonn International Centre Dr. Esther Meininghaus wrote:

"by drawing on religion, the Assad regime successfully sought to promote a value system ultimately rooted in the Baʿthist vision for Syrian society .... To this, we can indeed add the cult surrounding Presidents Hafiz and Bashar al-Asad, whose pictures are displayed not only in public buildings and schools but taxis and shops, or ceremonies such as mass parades and/or the playing of the national anthem during official celebrations. Also, official rhetoric has become increasingly infused with transcendental and metaphysical elements, in particular with regard to the President's personality cult. For instance, the President is addressed as the 'Eternal Leader' who will guide his people to becoming the 'true' Arab nation. The recent slogan of 'Bashar, Allah, Suriyya wa-bas' (Bashar, God, and Syria – that's it) possibly best epitomises how close the regime has come to creating a Syrian public religion in its own right. Whether the outward performance of 'regime rituals' was actually fully internalised or secretly mocked, it had to be practised and obeyed."

== Status ==
At the time of Bashar al-Assad's election in the party's June 2000 Regional Congress, which was fifteen years after the last such congress, Subhi Hadidi, a Syrian dissident, commented "The Ba'ath is in complete disarray. ... It's like a dead body. It's no longer a party in any normal sense of the word." Hanna Batatu wrote, "Under Assad the character of the Ba'ath changed ... Whatever independence of opinion its members enjoyed in the past was now curtailed, a premium being placed on conformity and internal discipline. The party became in effect another instrument by which the regime sought to control the community at large or to rally it behind its policies. The party's cadres turned more and more into bureaucrats and careerists, and were no longer vibrantly alive ideologically as in the 1950s and 1960s, unconditional fidelity to Assad having ultimately overridden fidelity to old beliefs."

According to Volker Perthes, the Ba'ath Party was transformed under Assad; Perthes wrote, "It was further inflated such as to neutralise those who had supported the overthrown leftist leadership, it was de-ideologised; and it was restructured so as to fit into the authoritarian format of Assad's system, lose its avant-garde character and became an instrument for generating mass support and political control. It was also to become the regime's main patronage network."

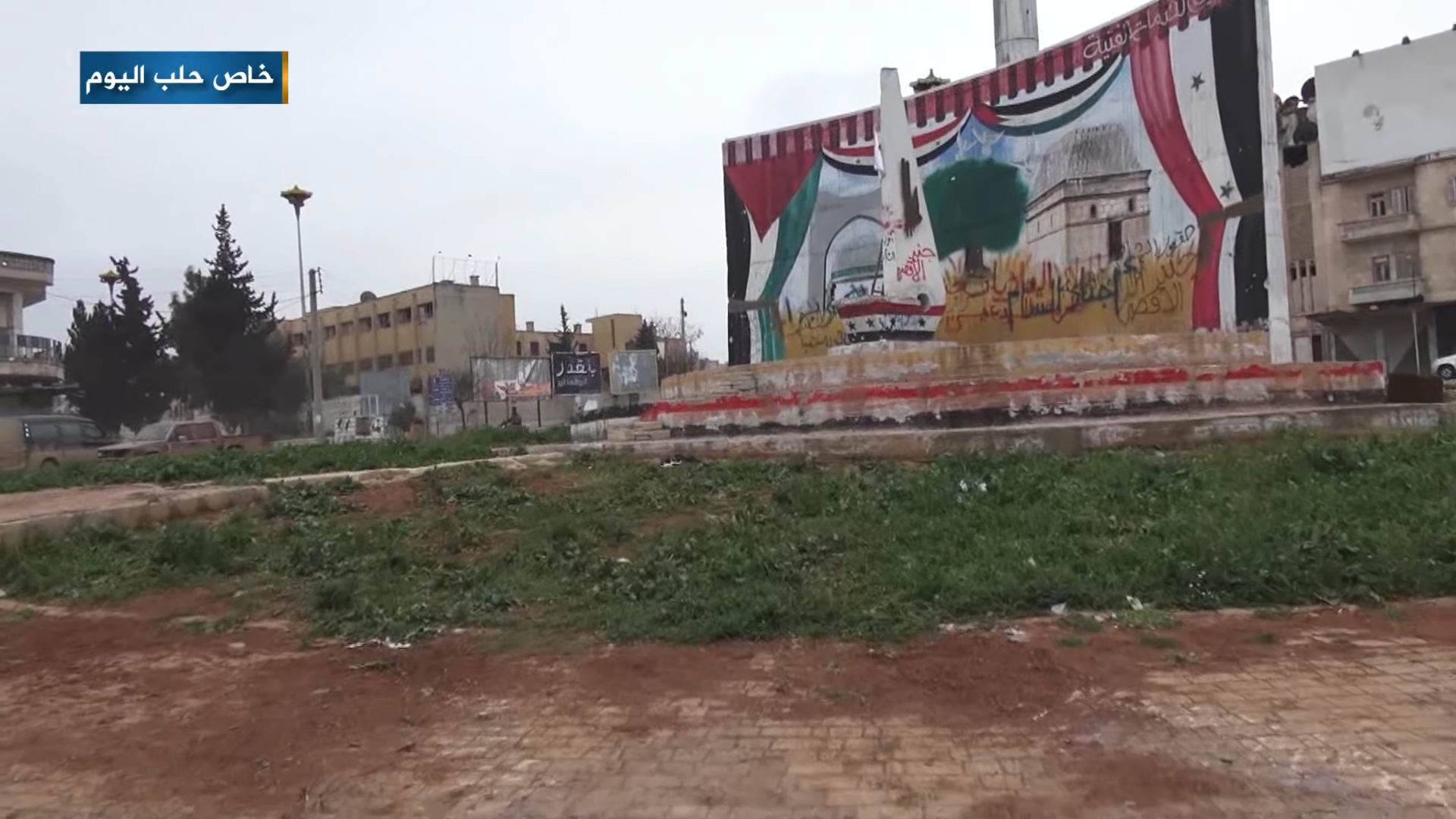
A defaced Ba'athist mural at the Mihrab roundabout in Idlib, shortly after the city's capture by rebel forces in March 2015

The Ba'ath Party was turned into a patronage network closely intertwined with the bureaucracy, and soon became virtually indistinguishable from the state, while membership rules were liberalized. In 1987, the party had 50,000 members in Syria, with another 200,000 candidate members on probation. The party lost its independence from the state and was turned into a tool of the Assad government, which remained based essentially in the security forces. Other parties that accepted the basic orientation of the government were permitted to operate again. The National Progressive Front was established in 1972 as a coalition of these legal parties, which were only permitted to act as junior partners to the Ba'ath, with very little room for independent organisation.

Despite its social and political subservience to Assadism, the Ba'ath party apparatus and its working establishments were crucial components in daily governance. The party facilitated Assad family's tight control over the state, served to organize supporters and mobilize mass-rallies for social legitimacy. Despite affirmation of multiple parties in the 2012 constitution; no real opposition was allowed to operate in practice. All candidates to the People's Assembly and local councils were from the National Progressive Front (NPF), a Ba'athist-led alliance firmly committed to the government. After 2018, the Ba'ath party expanded its political dominance and fielded more candidates in regional and national electoral processes, at the expense of other parties in the NPF. Internally, the party was strictly monitored by the High Command and regional Ba'athist leaders suspected of insufficient loyalty were expelled as "grey members" (al-Ramadiyyin).

As of 2022, the Ba'athists continued to dominate the regional councils, civil services, parliament, army and Mukhabarat. Vast majority of legalized trade unions, students associations also belonged to the Ba'ath party. More than a third of government employees in rural regions were Baath members; whereas in urban areas about half the officers were Baathists. Baath party institutions were vital to establish bureaucratic functioning in the government-controlled regions. Other parties of the National Progressive Front were minority in size.

== Anthem ==
Arabic script
Arabic transliteration
English translation

يا شبـاب العرب هيـا وانطـلق يا موكبـي
وارفـع الصوت قويـاً عاش بعــــث العـرب

نحــــــن فـلاح وعامــل وشـــبــاب لا يلـــين
نحــــــن جنـدي مقــاتـل نحن صوت الكادحين
من جذور الأرض جئنا مـن صميم الألـــــــم
بالضحــــايـا ما بخلنـــا بالعطـــاء الأكــــــرم

خنــــدق الثوار واحـــد أو يقـال الظــلم زال
صــامد يا بعــث صـامد أنت في ساح النضــال
وحــــــد الأحـرار هيــا وحــــد الشعب العظـيم
وامــض يا بعــث قويـاً للغـــد الحــــر الـكريــــم

yā šabāba l-ʕarbi hayyā wa-nṭaliq yā mawkibī
wa-rfaʕi ṣ-ṣawta qawiyyā(n) ʕāša Baʕaṯu l-ʕarabi

naḥnu fallāḥu wa-ʕāmil wa-šabābun lā yalīn
naḥnu jundiyyun muqātil naḥnu ṣawtu l-kādaḥīn
min juḏūri l-ʔarḍi jiʔnā min samīmi l-alami
bi-ḍ-ḍaḥāyā mā baḵilnā bi-l-ʕaṭāʔi l-ʔakrami

ḵandaqu ṯ-ṯuwwāri wāḥid ʔaw yuqāla ẓ-ẓulmu zāl
ṣāmidun yā Ba'aṯu ṣāmid ʔanta fī sāḥi n-niḍāl
waḥidi l-ʔaḥrara hayyā waḥidi š-šaʕaba l-ʔaẓīm
wāmḍi yā Ba'aṯu qawiyyā(n) li-l-ġadi l-ḥurri l-karīm

Arab youth, raise and march to fight your enemies,
Raise your voice: "Long live the Arab Ba'ath!"

We are farmers, workers and persistent youth,
We are soldiers, we are the voice of labourers,
We came from roots of this land and pain from hearts,
We weren't misers in giving sacrifice nobly.

All revolutionaries into the trenches, there's still injustice,
The Ba'ath will never surrender and stop struggling.
Go Ba'ath. Unite all revolutionaries, unite all great people,
Go strong for tomorrow in freedom and dignity.

Lyrics: Suleiman al-Issa

== Election results ==
=== Presidential elections ===
Election	Party candidate	Votes	%	Result
1971	Hafez al-Assad	1,919,609	99.2%	Elected ✓
1978	Hafez al-Assad	3,975,729	99.9%	Elected ✓
1985	Hafez al-Assad	6,200,428	100%	Elected ✓
1991	Hafez al-Assad	6,726,843	99.99%	Elected ✓
1999	Hafez al-Assad	8,960,011	100%	Elected ✓
2000	Bashar al-Assad	8,689,871	99.7%	Elected ✓
2007	Bashar al-Assad	11,199,445	99.82%	Elected ✓
2014	Bashar al-Assad	10,319,723	88.7%	Elected ✓
2021	Bashar al-Assad	13,540,860	95.1%	Elected ✓

=== Syrian People's Assembly elections ===
Election	Party leader	Seats	+/–
1949		1 / 114	▲1
1953		0 / 82	▼1
1954	Akram al-Hawrani	22 / 140	▲22
1961	Nureddin al-Atassi	20 / 140	▼2
1973	Hafez al-Assad	122 / 250	▲102
1977	Hafez al-Assad	125 / 250	▲3
1981	Hafez al-Assad	127 / 250	▲2
1986	Hafez al-Assad	130 / 250	▲3
1990	Hafez al-Assad	134 / 250	▲4
1994	Hafez al-Assad	135 / 250	▲1
1998	Hafez al-Assad	135 / 250	0
2003	Bashar al-Assad	167 / 250	▲32
2007	Bashar al-Assad	169 / 250	▲2
2012	Bashar al-Assad	168 / 250	▼1
2016	Bashar al-Assad	172 / 250	▲4
2020	Bashar al-Assad	167 / 250	▼5
2024	Bashar al-Assad	169 / 250	▲2
