= 2018 Syrian local elections =

Syrian local elections, 2018
- 16 September 2018

18,478 seats in 88 electoral districts

Local elections were held across Syria on 16 September 2018 to elect 18,478 local council members in 88 electoral districts. More than 40,000 to 41,000 candidates contested the elections according to pro-government sources. The elections were the first held since the 2011 Syrian local elections and took place amid the Syrian civil war. The elections only took place in territories under the control of the Syrian government, with special constituencies set up for areas outside of government control.

The Syrian government claimed that there was "good turnout" in the election, although this has been disputed.

== Candidates ==
Between 40,000 and 41,000 candidates contested the elections. The majority of the candidates were from the Ba'ath Party-led National Progressive Front under the National Unity List, while 30% of candidates were independents. Legal opposition parties such as the Syrian National Youth Party and the Syria Watan Party criticized the elections for not being fully democratic and did not stand any candidates. Some candidates from non-Ba'athist National Progressive Front parties withdrew in opposition to Ba'athist domination of the organization.

== Results ==
The Ministry of Local Affairs claimed that turnout of the election was 56%, although some sources say that turnout was lower at 26.5%. The Ba'ath Party dominated the election and won in many areas by default.
