= 1978 Syrian presidential election =

Syrian election 1978

- 8 February 1978
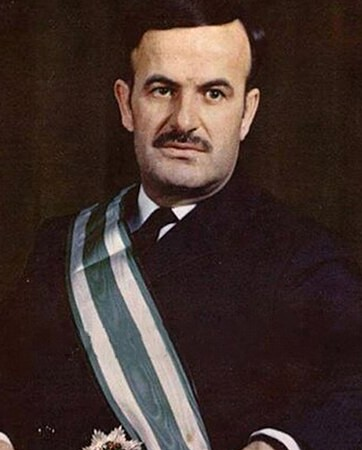
Nominee	Hafez al-Assad
Party	Ba'ath Party
Alliance	NPF
Popular vote	3,975,729
Percentage	99.88%
- Results by governorate Assad: 90–100% Election not held

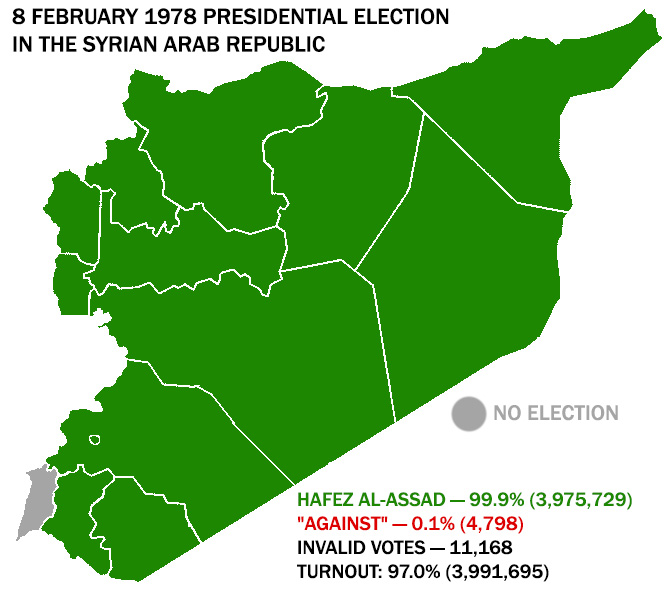
- Another variant of the presidential election 1971 results, which includes "against" and "invalid votes".
President before election
Hafez al-Assad
Ba'ath Party
Elected President
Hafez al-Assad
Ba'ath Party

Presidential elections were held in Syria on 8 February 1978. There was only one candidate, Hafez al-Assad, with voters asked to approve or reject his candidacy. A reported 99.9% of voters voted in favour, with a turnout of 97,0%.

== Results ==
Candidate	Party	Votes	%
Hafez al-Assad	Ba'ath Party	3,975,729	99.88
Against		4,798	0.12
Total		3,980,527	100.00
Valid votes		3,980,527	99.72
Invalid/blank votes		11,168	0.28
Total votes		3,991,695	100.00
Registered voters/turnout		4,115,149	97.00
Source: Nohlen et al.
