= The Day After: Supporting a Democratic Transition in Syria =

The Day After project was a cooperative movement by members of the Syrian opposition to outline a plan to rebuild the country and end the Syrian Civil War once Bashar al-Assad is ousted from power. The 45 members of the group held covert meetings in Berlin to determine the set of principles that should be used to construct a democracy in Syria. Members came from both official bodies such as the Syrian National Council and the Local Coordination Committees of Syria, as well as members who belonged to neither of these groups. On August 28, 2012, the group published its plan in a paper titled "The Day After Project: Supporting a Democratic Transition in Syria.

The Day After Association is an independent, Syrian-led civil society organization working to support a democratic transition in Syria. In August 2012, TDA completed work on a comprehensive approach to managing the challenges of a post-Assad transition in Syria. The Day After Project brought together a group of Syrians representing a large spectrum of the Syrian opposition—including senior representatives of the Syrian National Council (SNC), members of the Local Coordination Committees in Syria (LCC), and unaffiliated opposition figures from inside Syria and the Diaspora representing all major political trends and components of Syrian society—to participate in an independent transition planning process.

The TDA report, "The Day After: Supporting a Democratic Transition in Syria", provides a detailed framework of principles, goals and recommendations from within the Syrian opposition for addressing challenges in six key fields: rule of law; transitional justice; security sector reform; constitutional design; electoral system design; and post-conflict social and economic reconstruction. TDA has since shifted its focus from transition planning efforts to implementation of recommendations presented in the TDA report, opening its office in Istanbul to support this mission.".

== Background ==
Between January and June 2012, members of the Day After project worked on a report that would attempt to address the major aspects of the future transition. They were aided by experts in international planning and diplomacy. The purpose of the report was not to be a rigid directive for restructuring the Syrian government but rather to spark further conversation about the transition.

Six working groups each focused on an individual aspect of the new government that is to be set up, from restructuring the legal and justice system, to reforming the Syrian military, to writing a new constitution and setting up the system for electing a new Syrian legislature.

The project was jointly overseen and supported by the United States Institute of Peace and the German Institute for International and Security Affairs in Berlin.
