= Christoph Bertram =

German journalist (born 1937)

Christoph Bertram (born 3 September 1937) is a German journalist who is the director of the German Institute for International and Security Affairs. He was director of the International Institute for Strategic Studies from 1974 to 1982. He worked for the German-language weekly Die Zeit for sixteen years as head of a department and as a diplomatic correspondent. He was a member of the editorial board of Foreign Policy magazine. From 1980 to 1981 and from 1990 to 1993 he was a member of the steering committee of the Bilderberg meetings.
