= Revolutionary Youth Union =

Youth wing of the Syrian Ba'ath Party

Coordinates: 33°29′29.34″N 36°14′38.14″E

Revolutionary Youth Union اتحاد شبيبة الثورة
- Chairman: Maan Abboud
- Founded: 13 January 1970
- Dissolved: 29 January 2025; 21 months ago
- Headquarters: Damascus
- Ideology: Neo-Ba'athism; Arab nationalism Anti-Zionism; Arab socialism
- Position: Far-left
- Mother party: Arab Socialist Ba'ath Party in Syria
- International affiliation: World Federation of Democratic Youth
- Newspaper: Al Masirah
- Website: http://ryu-sy.org/

Revolutionary Youth Union (officially abbreviated RYU; Arabic: اتحاد شبيبة الثورة, Ittihad Shabibat ath-Thawra) was the youth organization of the Arab Socialist Ba'ath Party in Syria. RYU was a member organization of the World Federation of Democratic Youth.

== History ==
Revolutionary Youth Union was established in 1970 as a youth organization of the ruling Ba'ath Party. The organization's membership was made up of 12-18 year olds, with all secondary school students in the country automatically being made members. Members were required to be solely affiliated with the Ba'ath Party and with no other political organization. The organization had a newsletter named al-Masirah (English: The March). The RYU oversees the management of a special property known as Medina Shabab (literally “Youth City”), which were used for youth competitions and events, also organized by the RYU. RYU pushed youth onto the militaristic path through military events and marches - the organization also ran special camps with a military focus, where children wore military uniforms and did military activities.

=== Syrian civil war ===
According to the organization itself, tens of thousands of young people have joined the government army since the start of the civil war in Syria. In 2021, the RYU launched a program to help wounded civil war veterans and their families (of course, only those who fought on the side of the Bashar al-Assad government), which became known as Wasiya (testament). The organization also planned to launch two projects to support small enterprises, training to support talents, as well as setting up productive and ideological camps for “preparation for the struggle” (again).

On July 9, 2021, a draft resolution to disband Revolutionary Youth Union and Baath Vanguard, another Ba'athist youth organization, was sent on review. The current status of this draft resolution is unknown.

Following the fall of the Assad regime, the Union was banned by the Syrian transitional government alongside its mother party.
