= German Institute for International and Security Affairs =

German think tank in international relations and security studies

The German Institute for International and Security Affairs (German: Stiftung Wissenschaft und Politik; SWP) is a German think tank in international relations and security studies. A semi-official organization with close links to the federal government, it advises the Bundestag (the German parliament) and the federal government on foreign and security policy issues, and also advises decision-makers in international organisations relevant to Germany, above all the European Union, NATO and the United Nations. SWP is regarded as one of Europe's most influential think tanks in international relations. It is headquartered in Berlin and incorporated as a foundation.

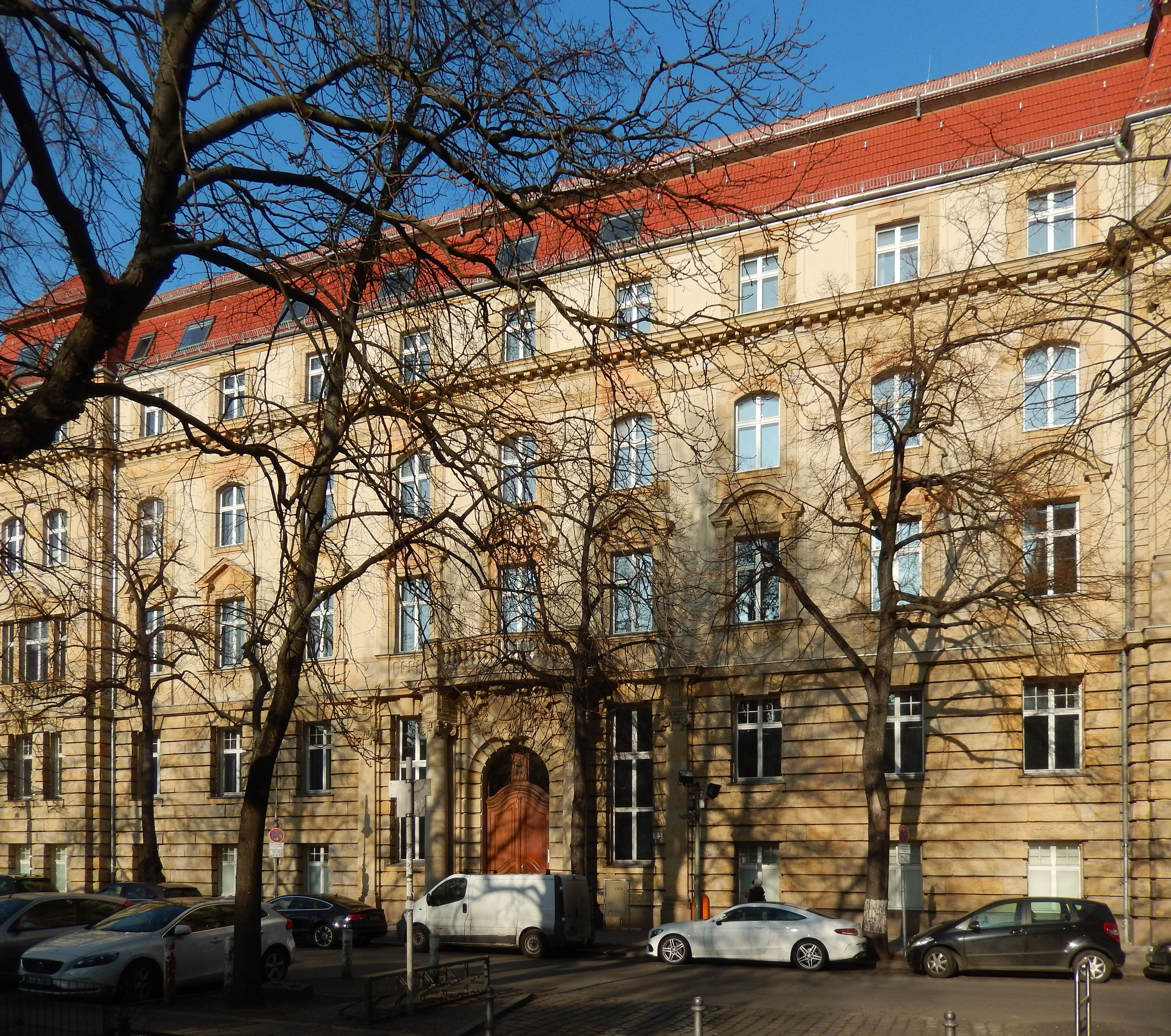
Headquarters of the Stiftung Wissenschaft und Politik in Berlin

== History and structure ==
The SWP was set up in 1962 as an initiative of the Federal Intelligence Service (BND), backed by a grant of 50,000 DM from the German industry. BND had sent the co-founder of its predecessor Gehlen Organization, Klaus Ritter, to the United States in 1959 on a study visit of the organisational structure of think tanks, during which Ritter met with Henry Kissinger, then involved with the Special Studies Project, and was told that Germany lacked an informal body for shaping international affairs. The Institute initially operated from Ebenhausen in Bavaria, near BND's own headquarters in Pullach. On 21 January 1965, the Bundestag approved it as a civil law foundation and included its funding in the German Chancellery budget. Ritter subsequently left the BND ranks to assume the position of the Institute's director. In 2001 the headquarters of the foundation and its research institute moved from Ebenhausen to Berlin. Since then it has been housed in a listed building on Ludwigkirchplatz.

To help it carry out its role as a civil-law foundation, SWP receives institutional funding at a rate determined by the Bundestag. This grant is approved annually on production of a budget by SWP, is paid from the Chancellery budget and covers all costs generated by SWP's core activity. SWP also conducts special research projects that receive third-party funding. In the financial year 2016, the SWP was federally funded to the tune of 12.3 million euros. This support was supplemented by 2.53 m from external sponsors.

Every two years, the guiding framework is redrafted by SWP's research department and the institute's leadership, before being submitted to the SWP Council for confirmation and then being put to the vote. Overall, the guiding framework concentrates on general issues in the two-year time frame, with particular reference to the current and foreseeable state of affairs in international politics. It sets specific thematic challenges and topics, for instance the United Nations' sustainability goals (SGDs), refugees and migrants, the dissolution of regional structures in the Middle East, and international crisis management (examples from the 2017–2018 research framework).

Within the established guiding framework, SWP is free to carry out and structure projects and research as it sees fit. This safeguards SWP's unhindered ability to address long-term issues as well as current events in international politics. Examples include analyses and texts on the crisis in Ukraine; the nuclear agreement with Iran; projects on refugee flows and development cooperation; and Israel and Its Regional and Global Conflicts: Domestic Developments, Security Issues and Foreign Affairs.

== Governance ==
=== Council ===
The Council (Stiftungsrat) is SWP's highest supervisory and decision-making body. It has three "benches":

1. "the Bundestag bench", consisting of one representative of each parliamentary party (currently 4).
2. "the Government bench": at least seven representatives of the federal government at the suggestion of the head of the Chancellery (currently 8).
3. "the private bench": at least seven eminent figures from academia, business and public life (currently 8).

Additionally, there are a president and two vice-presidents. The president and one of the vice-presidents also have to be eminent figures from academia, business or public life; the other vice-presidency is reserved for the head of the Chancellery. While the Chancellery supervises the organization of SWP, the Federal Government does not control its Council. It can neither assume the Council's leadership nor dominate voting majorities: no single "bench" can reach a simple majority by itself. Moreover, the election of members requires a two-thirds majority. The statutes thus deliberately compel the various representatives on the SWP Council to work together.

The President of SWP Council is Nikolaus von Bomhard; his vice-presidents are Helge Braun and Angelika Niebler. The chair of the research advisory committee is Christopher Daase (Frankfurt University).

=== Directors ===
- 1965–1987: Klaus Ritter
- 1987–1998: Michael Stürmer
- 1998–2005: Christoph Bertram
- 2005–2020: Volker Perthes
- 2020–present: Stefan Mair

== Research ==
SWP research is organised into eight divisions totalling about 60 researchers: EU/Europe; Centre for Applied Turkish Studies, International Security; the Americas; Eastern Europe, Eurasia; Middle East and Africa; Asia; and Global Issues.

There are currently more than 140 staff working at SWP, not counting visiting academics or researchers on fellowships. Following a decision by the SWP Council in January 2001, the staff of the Cologne-based Federal Institute for Russian, Bundesinstitut für Ostwissenschaftliche und Internationale Studien (BIOst) and the department of contemporary research at the Munich-based Institute for Southeast European Studies (SOI) were integrated into SWP.

All staff members of a research division hold university degrees, which tend be aligned with its subject. Among them are political scientists, lawyers, economists, natural scientists, sociologists, and physicists. Officers of the German military are also retained to share their expertise in security-related affairs.

SWP publishes all submitted analyses and reports.

=== "The Day After" project ===
As part of the project "The Day After", the SWP together with the United States Institute of Peace (USIP) gave Syrian intellectuals and representatives of various Syrian political movements the opportunity to discuss their ideas for the political, constitutional and economic development of Syria following a hypothetical replacement of Bashar al-Assad's government. In 2011–2012, many governments and observers alike were convinced that the uprising in Syria might well lead to the overthrow of the president, as it had in Tunisia and Egypt. The results of the project were made public in Syria and internationally via the report "The Day After. Supporting a Democratic Transition in Syria". The project did not address ideas, plans or preparations for an overthrow or regime change. A number of Syrians subsequently founded an NGO called The Day After to publicise and discuss the results among Syrians, and to contribute to the post-war order through projects in transitional justice mechanisms, document security and national heritage protection.

=== The "New Power, New Responsibility" project ===
A paper co-produced with the German Marshall Fund entitled "New Power, New Responsibility" (November 2012 – September 2013) called on Germany to assume more responsibility for dealing with "those who disrupt the international order". It argued that Germany and the EU need to show more willingness to act on international security issues, recommending inter alia that "Europe and Germany need to develop formats for NATO operations that make them less dependent on US support. This will require increased military deployment and stronger political leadership. Above all, Europe must take greater security precautions in its own neighbourhood: that is its own responsibility and no-one else's. Germany will have to make a contribution that is commensurate with its weight." The paper attracted much attention and is said to have exerted substantial influence on prominent members of the German government. Peace activists, however, were sharply critical. During the presentation of the new White Book by Federal Defence Minister von der Leyen, Volker Perthes emphasised that Germany was "a responsible middle power" and needed to "safeguard and transmit the European and global order along with other states".

See also: List of participants in the project "New Power – New Responsibility".

== Information infrastructure ==
Around 30 members of staff work in SWP's information infrastructure, which provides information services to both SWP academics and the Bundestag and federal ministries. SWP also leads the international relations and area studies information network (FIV), which manages one of the world's largest literature databases in the social sciences, World Affairs Online. This is made available to the (professional) public via various portals, catalogues and indexes, as well as SWP's own professional portal, IREON.

== Events ==
=== Leaked diplomatic cables ===
In November 2010 and January 2011 leaked diplomatic cables by US Embassy staff in Berlin described two events in December 2009 and January 2010 in which SWP director Volker Perthes had participated. Inter alia, the events addressed transatlantic differences of opinion on how to deal with Iran. At the January 2010 event, Perthes raised the question of whether the US was also considering non-belligerent or non-military means of preventing a potential nuclear "breakout" on the part of Iran. The question was based on the assumption that such programmes (cyber-attacks or other forms of sabotage which could render parts of the nuclear programme inoperative without starting or provoking a war) already existed. Perthes had also voiced this assumption in an article published on Open Democracy in January 2010. It was proved correct by reports showing that the Stuxnet attack must have started at least half a year before the January 2010 conversation at the US Embassy.

In a The Guardian interview about the January 2010 event at the US Embassy, Perthes said he had suggested that "unexplained occurrences" or "computer failures" were preferable to military strikes. And that military strikes or military escalation with Iran definitely needed to be avoided.

=== 2016 hacking attack ===
According to a report by German news outlet Spiegel Online, authorities suspect Russian hacking group known as "Fancy Bear" or "APT28" was behind a December 2016 attack on SWP.
