= 1985 Syrian presidential election =

- 10 February 1985
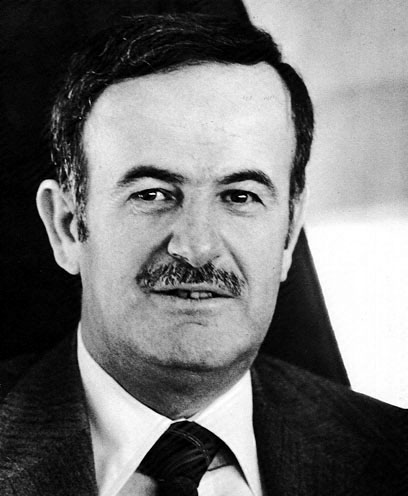
| Nominee | Hafez al-Assad |
| Party | Ba'ath Party |
| Alliance | NPF |
| Popular vote | 6,200,428 |
| Percentage | 99.99% |
- Results by governorate Assad: 90–100% Election not held

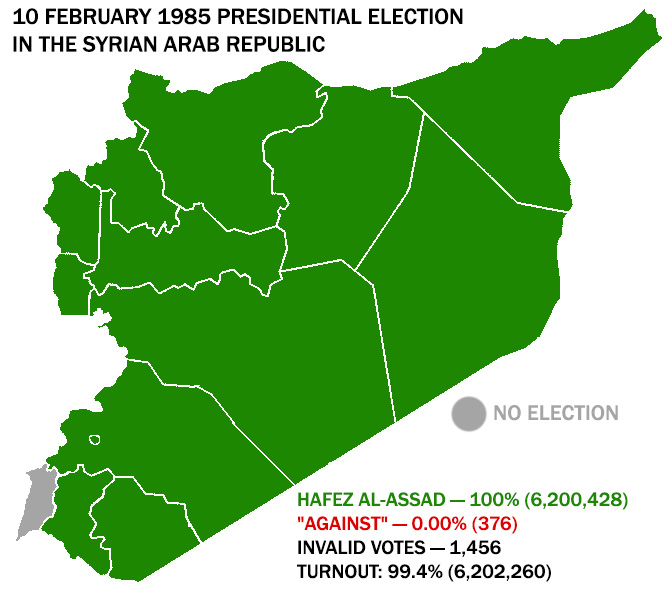
- Another variant of the presidential election 1985 results, which includes "against" and "invalid votes".
President before election
Hafez al-Assad
Ba'ath Party
Elected President
Hafez al-Assad
Ba'ath Party

Presidential elections were held in Syria on 10 February 1985. There was only one candidate, Hafez al-Assad, with voters asked to approve or reject his candidacy. A reported 99.99% of voters voted in favour, with a turnout of 94.53%.

== Results ==
| Candidate | Party | Votes | % |
|---|---|---|---|
| Hafez al-Assad | Ba'ath Party | 6,200,428 | 99.99 |
| Against | | 376 | 0.01 |
| Total | | 6,200,804 | 100.00 |
| Valid votes | | 6,200,804 | 99.98 |
| Invalid/blank votes | | 1,456 | 0.02 |
| Total votes | | 6,202,260 | 100.00 |
| Registered voters/turnout | | 6,560,862 | 94.53 |
Source: Nohlen et al.
