= Volker Perthes =

German political scientist (born 1958)

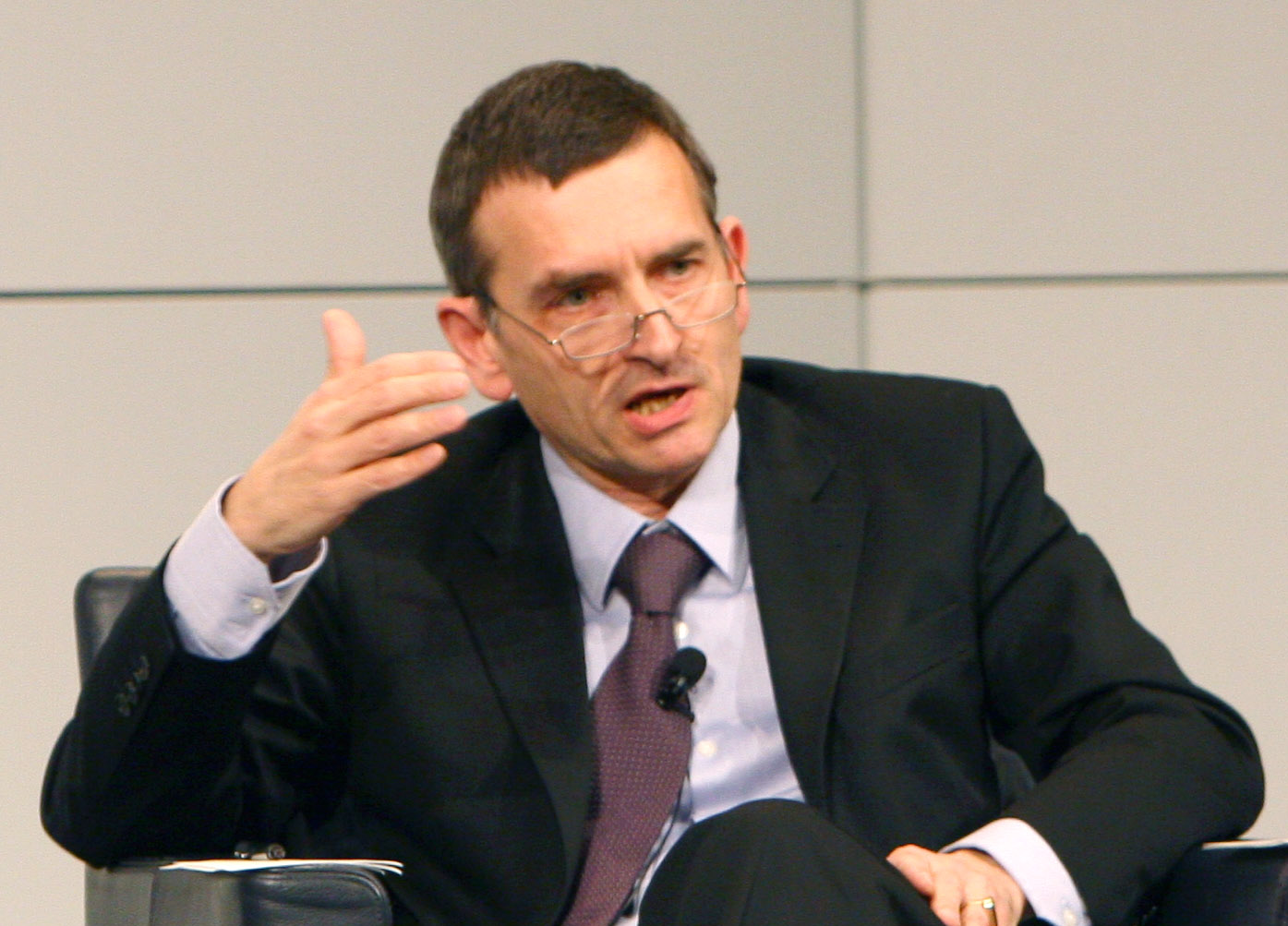
Perthes in 2011

Volker Perthes (German: [ˈfɔlkɐ̯ ˈpɛːɐ̯təs], born 16 May 1958) is a German political scientist, academic and writer. Apart from his focus on research, writing and teaching about the Middle East, he was director of the German Institute for International and Security Affairs (SWP) in Berlin from 2005 to 2020.

From 2021 to 2023, he served as Special Representative of the Secretary-General of the United Nations (SRSG) for Sudan and Head of the UN Integrated Transition Assistance Mission in Sudan (UNITAMS). Following this mandate, Perthes led the Independent Strategic Review of the UN Assistance Mission for Iraq (UNAMI) until March 2024. Since then, he has been Senior Distinguished Fellow at the German Institute for International and Security Affairs.

== Early life and education ==
Perthes studied for his first degrees in political science at the University of Duisburg and in Arabic language at the University of Bochum in Germany. From 1986 to 1987, he received a graduate scholarship from the German Academic Exchange Service to do research for his PhD in Syria. In 1990, Perthes received his PhD in political science with a thesis on the state and society in Syria from 1970 to 1989.

== Career ==
From 1991 to 1993, Perthes was assistant professor at the American University of Beirut and then taught at the German universities of Duisburg, Münster and Munich. In 1999, he earned his postdoctoral degree (habilitation) at the University of Duisburg.

=== German Institute for International and Security Affairs ===
In 1992, Perthes started to work at the German Institute for International and Security Affairs (German acronym: SWP). The main task of the SWP is to advise the German parliament and the Federal Government of Germany on questions of foreign and security policy, based on the institute's practice-oriented research. Until April 2005, Perthes was Head for the research group on the Middle East and Africa, and in October 2005, he became Director and Chief Executive Officer of the institute. After he left for positions with the United Nations, he continues with SWP as non-resident Senior Fellow. At the same time, he also taught as adjunct professor at the Humboldt University and at the Free University of Berlin. Based on his research, Perthes has published several non-fiction books as well as academic and policy papers on Syria, Lebanon, Iran, the European Union and the Palestinian Authority, including the wider Middle East. Apart from his native German, he is fluent in English and Arabic.

In September 2015, Perthes joined the Special Envoy of the Secretary-General for Syria, Staffan de Mistura, as Assistant Secretary-General and Senior Advisor to the UN in their talks for a peace process in Syria, and in October 2016, he became Chairperson of the International Syria Support Group's Ceasefire Taskforce for Syria.

In November 2015, Federal Minister for Economic Affairs and Energy Sigmar Gabriel appointed Perthes to the government's advisory board on the Transatlantic Trade and Investment Partnership (TTIP).

=== Special Representative for Sudan and Head of UNITAMS ===
On January 8, 2021, Perthes was appointed by the UN Secretary-General as Special Representative (SRSG) for Sudan and Head of the new UN Integrated Transition Assistance Mission in Sudan (UNITAMS). Following the 2021 Sudan coup d'état, Perthes held mediation talks with generals Abdel Fattah al Burhan and Mohamed Hamdan Dagalo, as well as with Prime Minister Abdalla Hamdouk, who was under house arrest, in order to "return to a comprehensive and urgent dialogue to restore partnership on the basis of the Constitutional Document and the Juba Peace Agreement."

On December 11, 2021, Perthes briefed the UN Security Council on the situation in Sudan after Hamdok had been reinstated on 21 November 2021 as Prime Minister. In his report and analysis, he made the following remarks:

Sudan’s military and political leaders will primarily have to rebuild trust with their own domestic public, particularly with the young generation. Immediate confidence-building measures and a visible commitment to bring the country back on a democratic transition path will be key. Similarly, Sudanese authorities will need to take demonstrable steps to regain financial, economic, and political support from the international community.

— Volker Perthes, Security Council briefing on the UN Integrated Transition Assistance Mission in Sudan

A day after the outbreak of violence in 2023, representatives from the Sudanese Armed Forces and the Rapid Support Forces agreed to a proposal by the United Nations to pause fighting between 16:00 and 19:00 local time (CAT). However, gunfire and explosives were still heard during the ceasefire, drawing condemnation from Perthes. Perthes briefed the UN Security Council on the situation on April 17, 2023.

Owing to the continuing fighting in Khartoum and other cities, the UNITAMS mission headed by Perthes relocated to Port Sudan to continue their mission in a safer environment. In June 2023, the military government of Sudan declared Perthes, who was on a mission outside of the country, no longer welcome in the country, accusing him of having encouraged the Rapid Support Forces to take up arms against the Sudanese army. In response, the office of UN Secretary-General António Guterres declared their full confidence in Perthes and refuted the action as incompatible with Sudan's UN obligations. After initially attempting to carry out his duties from abroad, Perthes submitted his resignation on September 13, 2023. Given the continuing military conflict in Sudan, he considered it impossible to carry out his work effectively from outside. At the same time, he warned of the danger that the fighting in Sudan could escalate into a “full-scale civil war.” In his last briefing to the UN Security Council, Perthes said:

Often indiscriminate aerial bombing is conducted by those who have an air force, which is the SAF. Most of the sexual violence, lootings and killings happen in areas controlled by the RSF and are conducted or tolerated by the RSF and their allies.

— Volker Perthes, UN Special Representative in Sudan (2021-2023)

=== UN-Mission in Iraq ===
In October 2023, the UN Secretary-General appointed Perthes as the Head of the Independent Strategic Review for the United Nations Assistance Mission for Iraq (UNAMI), mandated by Security Council resolution 2682 (2023). After completion of his mission, Perthes transmitted his report to the UN General Secretary on 26 March, 2024. His review had evaluated current threats to Iraq's peace and security—fragility of institutions, proliferation of armed actors, and risks of Islamic State resurgence or extremism—while noting Iraq's progress toward stability and pluralism. It assessed UNAMI's relevance after 20 years, highlighting its roles in mediation, elections, human rights, and coordination amid evolving mandates. Perthes recommended an orderly transition for UNAMI by May 2026, aligning with Iraq's government request: streamline to humanitarian/development from May 2024, residual tasks to the UN country team from May 2025, reduce staffing, and shift political functions to national institutions. He suggested promoting regional cooperation, defining success indicators (e.g., elections, dialogue mechanisms), and biennial reporting during transition.

== Professional memberships ==
Prior to his nomination as SRSG in Sudan, Perthes was a member of several scientific advisory bodies, such as the Shanghai Institute for International Studies (SIIS), as chairperson for the advisory council of the Finnish Institute of International Affairs (FIIA), and the German Robert Bosch Foundation's International Advisory Council.

== Distinctions ==
- 2009: Karl Carstens Award of the German Federal Academy for Security Policy
- 2011: Order of Merit of the Federal Republic of Germany

== Select publications ==
=== as author ===
- Economic Change, Political Control and Decision Making in Syria, Reportnummer SWP S 401, Stiftung Wissenschaft und Politik, Forschungsinstitut für Internationale Politik und Sicherheit, Ebenhausen 1994.
- The Political Economy of Syria under Asad, London: I.B. Tauris 1995.
- Nizam al-sira` fi al-sharq al-awsat: al-makhatir al-mulazima li-`amaliat al-taswiya [The Conflict System in the Middle East: The Risks Accompanying the Settlement Process], Beirut: Centre for Strategic Studies, Research and Documentation 1997.
- with Muriel Asseburg: The European Union and the Palestinian Authority. Recommendations for a New Policy. Reportnummer SWP S 421, Stiftung Wissenschaft und Politik, Forschungsinstitut für Internationale Politik und Sicherheit, Ebenhausen 1998.
- Syria under Bashar al-Assad: Modernisation and the Limits of Change, London: Institute for Strategic Studies/ Oxford University Press 2004 (Adelphi Paper 366).

=== as editor ===
- Scenarios for Syria. Socio-economic and Political Choices (= Aktuelle Materialien zur internationalen Politik, Band 45), Nomos, Baden-Baden 1998 (ISBN 3-7890-5722-3).
- Germany and the Middle East. Interests and Options, Heinrich Böll Foundation, Berlin 2003 (ISBN 3-927760-42-0).
- Arab Elites: Negotiating the Politics of Change, Boulder: Lynne Rienner 2004

=== other publications ===
- "Syria: Too Fragile to Ignore". Stiftung Wissenschaft und Politik (SWP).
- "America, China and the complexity of their rivalry". The Security Times. 2020-02-13.
- with Wibke Hansen (17 March 2020). "Why Sudan's Democratic Transition Depends on Stability in Darfur". www.worldpoliticsreview.com.
- Scientific policy advice and foreign policymaking – Stiftung Wissenschaft und Politik (SWP), the German Institute for International and Security Affairs, in: Lentsch, Justus / Weingart, Peter (eds.), The Politics of Scientific Advice. Institutional Design for Quality Assurance, Cambridge: Cambridge University Press 2011, p. 286-294.
