= United Nations Integrated Transition Assistance Mission in Sudan =

- Abbreviation: UNITAMS
- Formation: 3 June 2020
- Legal status: Completed
- Head: Volker Perthes
- Parent organization: United Nations Security Council
- Website: https://unitams.unmissions.org/en

The United Nations Integrated Transition Assistance Mission in Sudan (UNITAMS) is one of the UN's special missions to assist Sudan in supporting the transition from dictatorship to democratic rule.

The operation was approved by the UN Security Council in 2020 under Resolution 2524 in accordance with the request of the civilian transitional government that ruled the country. The operation replaces the previous military operation UNAMID, a cooperation between the United Nations and the African Union, which ended on 31 December 2020.

Mid 2023 Abdel Fattah al-Burhan demanded that UNITAMS head Volker Perthes be dismissed. In November the government of Sudan requested that the mission be ended. The United Nations Security Council agreed to end the mission by 3 December 2023, with 14 votes in favour and one abstention, with a subsequent three-month withdrawal period.

== See also ==
- United Nations Mission in Sudan
- United Nations–African Union Mission in Darfur
- United Nations Interim Security Force for Abyei
