= 2000 Syrian presidential election =

- 10 July 2000
- Turnout: 94.55%
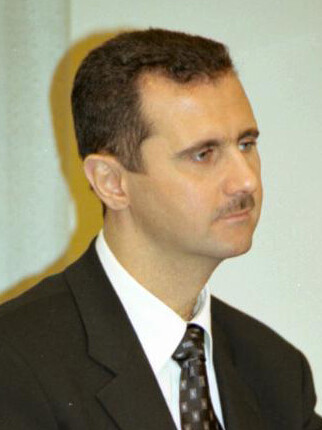
Nominee	Bashar al-Assad
Party	Ba'ath Party
Alliance	NPF
Popular vote	8,689,871
Percentage	99.74%
- Results by governorate Assad: 90–100% Election not held

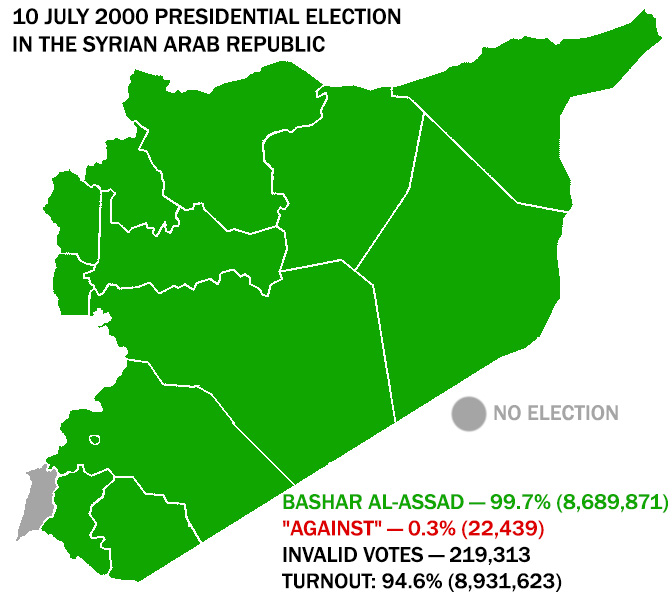
- Another variant of the presidential election 2000 results, which includes "against" and "invalid votes".
President before election
Abdul Halim Khaddam (acting)
Ba'ath Party
Elected President
Bashar al-Assad
Ba'ath Party

A presidential referendum was held in Syria on 10 July 2000, following the death of President Hafez al-Assad. The candidate chosen by the parliament was his son, Bashar al-Assad, with voters then asked to approve or reject his candidacy. A reported 99.7% of voters voted in favour, with a turnout of 95%.

== Background ==
After the death of President Hafez al-Assad on 10 June parliament voted to amend the constitution to lower the minimum age for presidential candidates from 40 to 34, Bashar al-Assad's age at the time.

== Results ==
The election was not free nor fair with opposition figures stating that the real purpose was to crush any opposition.

Candidate	Party	Votes	%
Bashar al-Assad	Ba'ath Party	8,689,871	99.74
Against		22,439	0.26
Total		8,712,310	100.00
Valid votes		8,712,310	97.54
Invalid/blank votes		219,313	2.46
Total votes		8,931,623	100.00
Registered voters/turnout		9,446,054	94.55
Source: Nohlen et al.
