= Egypt–Iraq relations =

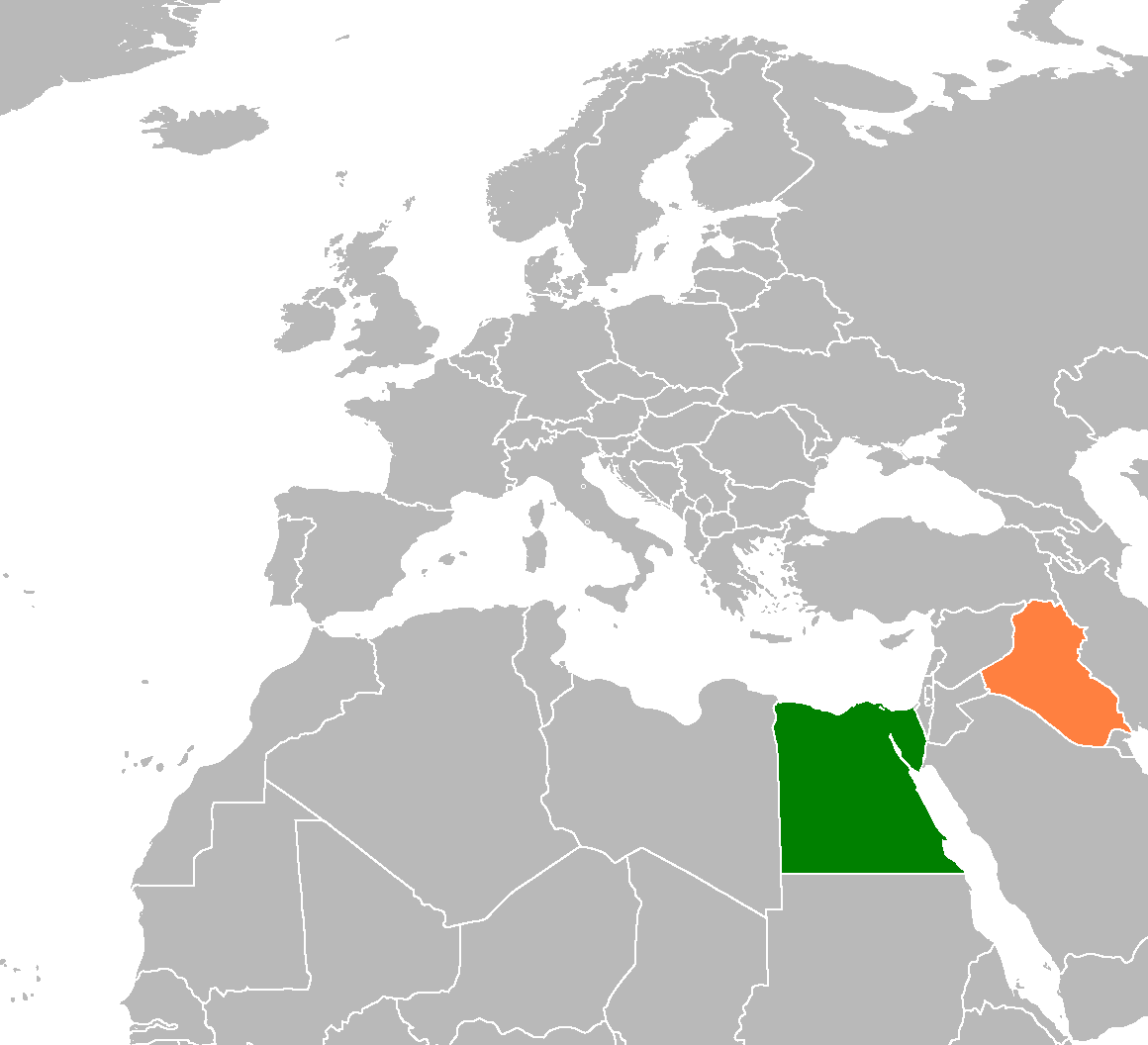
- Egypt: Iraq

Diplomatic mission
- Egyptian embassy, Baghdad: Iraqi embassy, Cairo

Egypt–Iraq relations have alternated over time between cooperation and rivalry. The relationship soured in 1977 following Egypt's peace accords with Israel. In 1978, Baghdad hosted an Arab League summit that condemned Egypt for accepting the Camp David Accords. However, Egypt's strong material and diplomatic support for Iraq in the Iran–Iraq War led to warmer relations and contact between senior officials, despite the absence of ambassadorial-level representation. Since 1983, Iraq has repeatedly called for the restoration of Egypt's "natural role" among Arab countries. In January 1984, Iraq successfully led Arab efforts within the OIC to restore Egypt's membership. Egypt–Iraq relations worsened again in 1990 after Egypt joined the UN coalition that forced Iraq out of Kuwait. However, relations have steadily improved since then and Egypt is now one of Iraq's main trade partners (formerly under the Oil-for-Food Programme).

== Ancient, Medieval and Early modern period ==
In 673 BCE, the Neo-Assyrian Empire invaded Egypt, overthrowing the 25th dynasty of Ancient Egypt. In 905 AD, the Abbasid government in Iraq ordered an invasion of Tulunid Egypt. The Egyptians were unable to resist and Egypt came under direct caliphal rule again. However, the Abbasid realm could not halt the tide of decentralization, and Egypt eventually became independent again.

During the Fatimid rule in Egypt, nominal Abbasid authority was not recognized. It was also around this time, Iraqi scholar, Alhazen was forced into hiding by the Egyptian caliph, Al-Hakim. This changed when Iraqi-born Saladin seized power; he realigned Egypt to the Abbasid caliphs of Iraq. After the Mongol conquest of Iraq, the Abbasid caliph fled to Mamluk Egypt, where his dynasty would stay for the next two centuries until the Ottoman conquest.

Egypt regained a degree of autonomy during the rule of Muhammad Ali, who turned Egypt into a challenging force against the Ottomans. As Egyptian troops approached Ottoman Syria, the Ottomans decided the unpredictable and untrustworthy Mamluk government in Iraq had to be subdued first, ending Iraqi autonomy for a century.

== Post-Ottoman Independence period ==
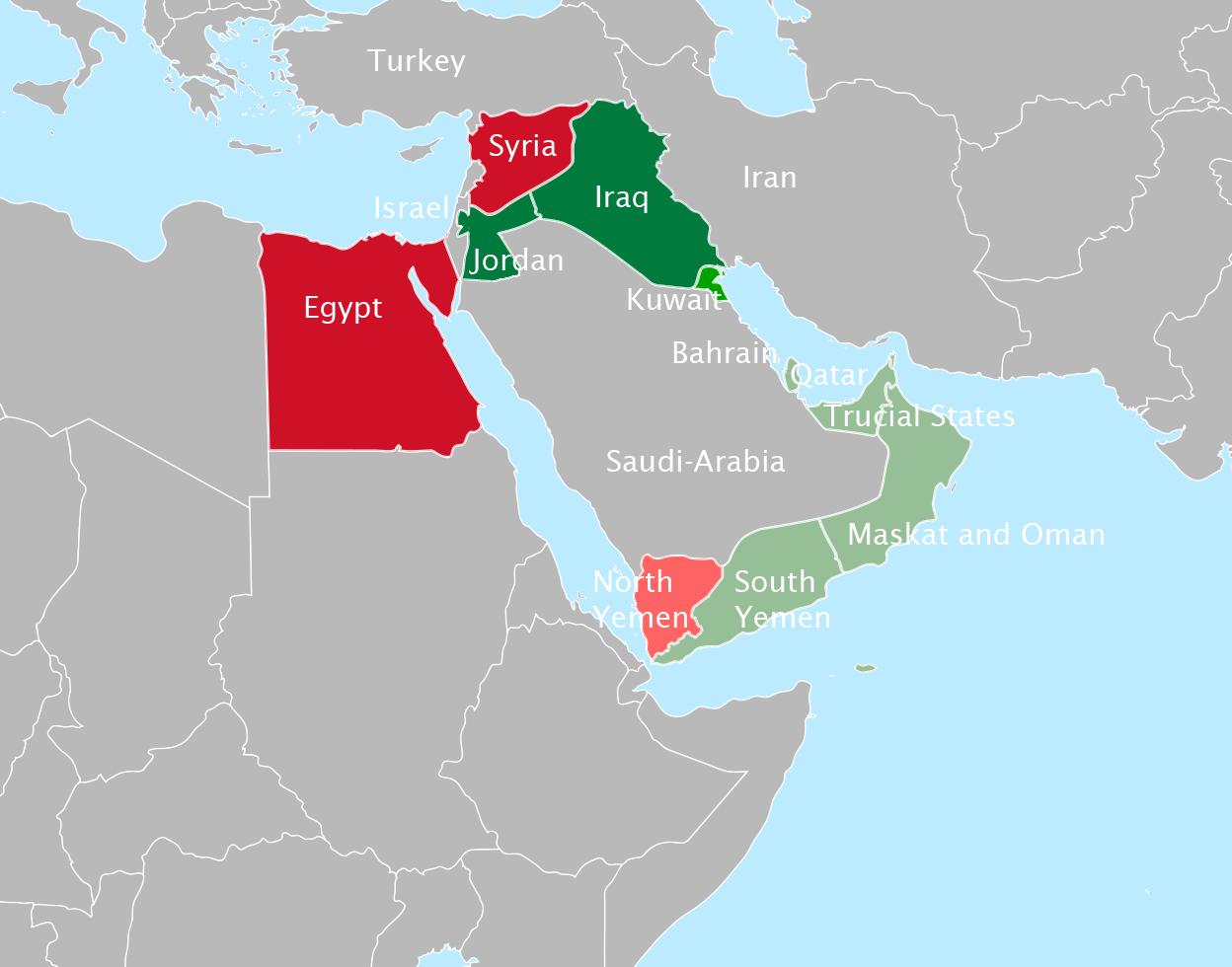
Middle East in 1958: United Arab Republic (red), United Arab States (red and light-red), Arab Federation (green), British Kuwait (grass green), other British protectorates in the Persian Gulf region (light green)

During World War I, Britain gained controlled over Egypt and Iraq from the Ottomans. After revolutions in Egypt and Iraq these countries became de jure independent kingdoms, but were Britain retained a major political control in the kingdoms.

The new Kingdom of Egypt and Kingdom of Iraq maintained good relations. They were founding members of the Arab League and both participated in the 1948 Arab–Israeli War.

Britain's continued influence in politics, the defeat of Egypt in the war, and the corruption of the Egyptian monarchy culminated in a revolution in Egypt that overthrow the monarchy, led by a group of Egyptian army officers known as the Free Officers. One officer, Gamal Abdel Nasser, would later consolidate power and become the president of Egypt.

His anti-British, anti-colonial stance worried the British, who still had troops based in the Suez Canal, as well friendly governments in the region, such as with then monarchy of Iraq. Britain would create a military alliance with Iraq and other regional governments. Nasser would later nationalize the canal, which was operated by a private company mostly owned by Westerners. When news of Nasser's decision reached British prime minister Anthony Eden, he was at a dinner with King Faisal II of Iraq and Iraqi prime minister Nuri es-Said who told Eden to "hit [Nasser] hard, hit him soon, and hit him by yourself". France and Israel, who were annoyed with Nasser because of his support for the Algerians and Palestinians, colluded with Britain to invade Egypt, triggering the Suez Crisis. Britain, France and Israel were later forced to retreat from Egypt because of international pressure, cementing Nasser's legacy in the Arab world as an Arab nationalist hero and creating an Arab nationalist personality cult and political ideology, while straining Egypt's relationship with the pro-west Arab monarchies. Nasser was a believer in Pan-Arabism, which called for a united Arab state to counter Western influence in the Arab World. Egypt and Syria would unify in 1958, forming the United Arab Republic. The Hashemite dynasty, who were ruling both Jordan and Iraq, decided to unite their kingdoms to form Arab Federation, to counter Nasser's influence in the region. Nasserism played an indirect role in the growth of Ba'athism.

== Post-Revolution period ==
United Arab Republic–Iraq relations
- United Arab Republic: Iraq

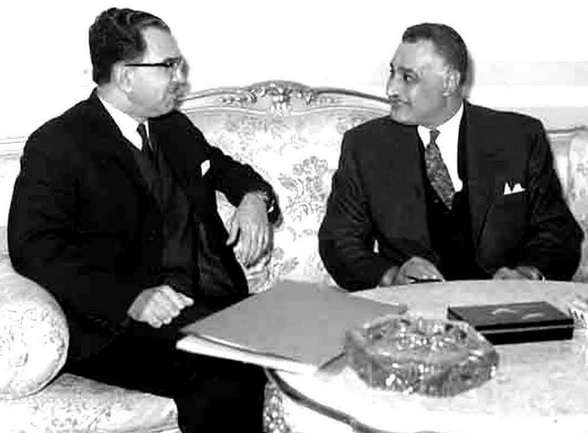
Nasser and Iraqi Prime Minister al-Bazzaz

The Iraqi monarchy would later be overthrown in a revolution in 1958, ending the Arab Federation. Abdul al-Karim Qasim became Iraq's president, and withdrew Iraq form the Baghdad Pact. Though Qasim was against the British government's influence in his country, he was wary of Nasser's influence, instead promoting Iraqi nationalism. Nasser's ideas of Pan-Arabism would threaten his government, especially after Egypt's union with Syria in 1958, which led to Nasserists in Iraq to call for Iraq to join the union. Though Syria left the union in 1961, Egypt kept the name United Arab Republic, and encouraged other nations to form a union. The Nasserists, led by Abdul Salam Arif, would lead a schism in Iraqi politics. Arif allied with the Iraqi Ba'athists, while the Iraqi communists and Qasim opposed unification.

Iraqi flag from 1963-1991, and also the flag of Syria from 1963-1972. The three stars were said to represent Iraq, Syria and Egypt, and their desire to unify into one state.

The Ba'athists later overthrow Qasim's government in 1963. Arif became president, while the Ba'athist Ahmed Hassan al-Bakr became prime minister. Factionalism dominated Iraqi politics, and the Ba'athist government would be purged by Arif later that year. The Nasserist Iraqi Arab Socialist Union became the only legal party in Iraq. Egypt and Iraq discussed a gradual union to transition into a unified Arab state, after the Syria left the union in 1961. In contrast to the quick unification of Egypt and Syria in 1958, the talks for a further union were meant to be done in slow stages. Iraqi Prime minister Abd al-Rahman al-Bazzaz led this transition; Iraq adopted the Egyptian coat of arms eagle and the Egyptian national anthem and adopted the UAR flag, but with three stars, to represent Iraq's desire to join the union. Arif also implemented Nasserist policies, such as then nationalization of industries. However, Arif and Bazzaz gradually became disillusioned with the plans for a union, and began purging Nasserists from his government, which curtailed the Nasserist Iraqi military's power over politics. The rivalry between the military and the civilian government would continue to dominate Iraqi politics. When away on a meeting in Morocco in 1965, the Nasserist Arif Abd ar-Razzaq attempted a coup against Arif, though it was successfully repressed. Arif Abd ar-Razzaq would later flee to Egypt after the coup's failure . Abdul Salam Arif died in a plane crash the next year, and his brother, Abdul Rahman Arif, would succeed him as president.

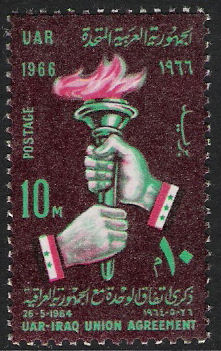
UAR (Egyptian) stamp celebrating the union agreement with Iraq on 5-25-1964

Syrian analyst Sami Moubayed called Rahman Arif "the weakest president ever to rule Iraq since the officers came to power in 1958 - a harmless (leader) who tried to befriend everybody, Nasserist Egypt, Ba'athist Syria, the United States and the Soviet Union". As a response to the de-Nasserization of the Iraqi government and the threat the government posed to the Iraqi military political machine, the Egyptian government supported a failed military coup against Arif and Bazzaz led by Razzaq in 1966. Rahman Arif was later overthrown in a Ba'athist coup in 1968 after Egypt's defeat in the 1967 Arab-Israeli war, returning Ba'athist control of Iraq.

== Post-Nasserist/Ba'athist period ==
Nasser died in 1970, and Anwar Sadat succeeded him as president of Egypt. Nasserists still dominated the early Sadat era, and pan-Arabist plans were still organized between Egypt and other Arab nations. The Egyptian government, as well as the Libyan and Syrian government, attempted a merger into a Federation of Arab Republics. Iraq joined the Federation in 1972. During this time, Egypt and Syria planned for a war with Israel to retake Sinai and the Golan Heights. Iraq participated in this war, sending troops to the Syrian front. However, the federation was never implemented. Egypt-Libyan relations soured after Libya wasn't invited to participate in the planning of the war and Egypt thwarted a Libyan attempt to blow up a ship carrying the wife of Shimon Peres. After the failure of Libya to join to union, Iraq too became disillusioned with its plans to join the union. Iraq rejected the ceasefire with Israel, and was critical of the Egyptian-Israel peace process. After the peace-treaty, Iraq hosted an Arab League summit to expel Egypt from the league because of the Egypt-Israel peace treaty.

Egypt–Iraq relations were sour from during the final years of the Sadat's presidency as Sadat embraced a more pro-West foreign policy, though Sadat did sell weapons to Iraq during the Iran-Iraq war. After the assassination of Anwar Sadat in 1981, his vice president, Hosni Mubarak, became the new president of Egypt. Under Mubarak, Egyptian foreign relations were a realist compromise between Nasser's pro-Arab anti-West policies and Sadat's pro-West strategy. Egypt built up relations with the Arab world, such as inviting Yasser Arafat to a summit in Cairo in 1983. When Iraq invaded Iran, Egypt provided military and logistical assistance to Iraq, which was ruled by its new Ba'athist president, Saddam Hussein, who studied in Egypt in the 1960s. By 1989, Egypt had returned to the Arab League, and the Iran-Iraq war had ended. During this year, Egypt and Iraq, as well as Jordan and North Yemen established the Arab Cooperation Council (ACC), an organization designated to fostering closer economic ties with these governments. However, Iraq's invasion of Kuwait would dissolve this organization and freeze relations with Egypt.

== First and Second Iraq Wars ==
Egypt–Iraq relations soured in 1990, when Egyptian migrant workers in Iraq faced persecution, harassment and murder by Iraqi veterans because they viewed Egyptians as competitions in the labor market. Relations were also strained during the Kuwait Crisis. Before the war, Saddam's brother proposed an intelligence sharing agreement with Egypt, which Mubarak turned down. Mubarak later said "retrospect, it was obvious that military cooperation was to be the sine qua non of the ACC. It really persuaded us that the aggression against Kuwait was long planned, and that members of the ACC were part of this conspiracy." During the Iraqi occupation of Kuwait, Mubarak was in contact with the Iraqi government, making 26 appeals to Saddam himself, including a 44 page letter detailing the Egyptian view on the crisis. Egypt supported the complete withdrawal of Iraqi forces from Kuwait for a multitude of reasons: Kuwaiti investments in Egypt represented 25% of all Arab foreign investment in Egypt, the invasion led to a sharp decrease to the important tourist sector in the Egyptian economy, and remittances from GCC nations dried up. Iraq's decision to invade Kuwait surprised the Egyptian government. Before the invasion, Mubarak personally intervened to settle disputes between Iraq and Kuwait. Though this went nowhere, Saddam personally assured Mubarak that Iraq had no plans for an invasion. Though Mubarak wished for a peaceful diplomatic solution, Egypt would join the Coalition of the Gulf War, committing 35,000 troops and several hundred tanks.

Post-Gulf war relations between Mubarak's and the Saddam's Iraq were frozen. While Iraq was sanctioned by the US and increasingly isolated from both the Arab world, Egypt enjoyed tighter integration with the West and Gulf States. Iraq may have played a role in a failed anti-government plot in 1991. Egypt encouraged Iraq to allow weapons inspections. However, Mubarak was personally against the 2003 invasion of Iraq, saying that it would cause "100 Bin Ladens", and that removing Saddam would only strength Iranian power in the region.

== Current Relationship ==
After the toppling of Saddam's regime, Mubarak encouraged a quick withdrawal from Iraq and supported a return to a military dictatorship in Iraq. Mubarak also personally spoke out against the hanging of Saddam, believing that it would cause more instability.

Egypt and Iraq reestablished trade ties in 2004, and relations have resumed positively. Though the First Gulf War ruptured diplomatic relations between Iraq and Egypt, but there have been improvements in recent years with many senior officials from both countries exchanging visits. The last meeting was in June 2021 when Egypt's President Abdel Fattah al-Sisi, Iraqi Prime Minister Mustafa Al-Kadhimi together with Jordan's King Abdullah met in Baghdad. This is the first visit by an Egyptian head of state to Iraq since Saddam Hussein invaded Kuwait in 1990. This meeting aimed at closer security, economic, trade, and investment cooperation between the Arab nations. It also aimed at forging an alliance between the Arab nations to solve Palestinian issues, combat terrorism, and reinforce trading. In recent years, Iraq had signed cooperation deals in the energy, health, and education sectors with both countries.

== Resident diplomatic missions ==
- Egypt has an embassy in Baghdad and a consulates-general in Basra and Erbil.
- Iraq has an embassy in Cairo.

== See also ==
- Foreign relations of Egypt
- Foreign relations of Iraq
- Arab Cold War

== Sources ==
- Fargues, P. el-Masry, S. Sadek, S. & Shaban, A. (2008). "Iraqis in Egypt A Statistical Survey in 2008. Migration and Refugee Movements in the Middle East and North Africa", 1–95.
- Faksh, Mahmud A. (1992) [Spring]. "Egypt and the Gulf Crisis: The Role of Leadership Under Mubarak". Journal of Third World Studies. 9 (1). University Press of Florida: 40–58. JSTOR 45197155 – via JSTOR.
- Abdalla, Ahmed (1991) [January/February]. "Mubarak's Gamble". Middle East Report (168): 18–21. doi:10.2307/3012663. JSTOR 3012663 – via JSTOR.
- K, G. E (1955). "Iraq, Egypt, and the Arab League". The World Today. 11 (4). Royal Institute of International Affairs: 145–15. JSTOR 40392807 – via JSTOR.
- Gomaa, Ahmed M. (1977). The Foundation of the League of Arab States: Wartime Diplomacy and Inter-Arab Politics, 1941 to 1945. Longman. ISBN 9780582780736.
