= List of presidents of Iraq =

This is a list of presidents of Iraq since the formation of the First Republic of Iraq in 1958.

== List of officeholders ==
No.	Portrait	Name (Birth–Death)	Elected	Term of office			Political party
No.	Portrait	Name (Birth–Death)	Elected	Took office	Left office	Time in office	Political party
→ • First Republic of Iraq (1958–1968) • →
1		Muhammad Najib ar-Ruba'i محمد نجيب الربيعي (1904–1965)	—	14 July 1958	8 February 1963 (deposed)	4 years, 209 days	Military
2		Abdul Salam Arif عبد السلام عارف (1921–1966)	—	8 February 1963	13 April 1966 (died in office)	3 years, 64 days	Military / Arab Socialist Union
—		Abdul-Rahman al-Bazzaz عبد الرحمن البزاز (1913–1973); Acting President	—	13 April 1966	16 April 1966	3 days	Arab Socialist Union
3		Abdul Rahman Arif عبد الرحمن عارف (1916–2007)	—	16 April 1966	17 July 1968 (deposed)	2 years, 92 days	Military / Arab Socialist Union
→ • Ba'athist Iraq (1968–2003) • →
4		Ahmed Hassan al-Bakr أحمد حسن البكر (1914–1982)	—	17 July 1968	16 July 1979 (resigned)	10 years, 364 days	Military / Iraqi Ba'ath Party (Iraq Region)
5		Saddam Hussein صدام حسين (1937–2006)	1995; 2002	16 July 1979	9 April 2003 (deposed)	23 years, 267 days	Iraqi Ba'ath Party (Iraq Region)
• Republic of Iraq (2003–2004) • Coalition Provisional Authority (Iraqi Governing Council)
—		Jay Garner جاي غارنر (born 1938); Director of the Office for Reconstruction and Humanitarian Assistance of Iraq	—	21 April 2003	12 May 2003	21 days	Republican (United States)
—		Paul Bremer بول بريمر (born 1941); Administrator of the Coalition Provisional Authority of Iraq	—	12 May 2003	28 June 2004	1 year, 47 days	Republican (United States)
→ • Republic of Iraq (2004–present) • →
—		Ghazi Mashal Ajil al-Yawer غازي مشعل عجيل الياور (born 1958); Interim President	2004	28 June 2004	7 April 2005	283 days	The Iraqis
6		Jalal Talabani جلال طالباني (1933–2017)	2005; 2006; 2010	7 April 2005	24 July 2014	9 years, 108 days	Patriotic Union of Kurdistan
7		Fuad Masum فؤاد معصوم (born 1938)	2014	24 July 2014	2 October 2018	4 years, 70 days	Patriotic Union of Kurdistan
8		Barham Salih برهم صالح (born 1960)	2018	2 October 2018	17 October 2022	4 years, 15 days	Patriotic Union of Kurdistan
9		Abdul Latif Rashid عبد اللطيف رشيد (born 1944)	2022	17 October 2022	12 April 2026	3 years, 177 days	Patriotic Union of Kurdistan
10		Nizar Amidi نزار آميدي (born 1968)	2026	12 April 2026	Incumbent	121 days	Patriotic Union of Kurdistan

== See also ==
- List of kings of Iraq
- President of Iraq
- Vice President of Iraq
- Prime Minister of Iraq
  - List of prime ministers of Iraq
