= Khalil Dabbagh =

Iraqi military officer

Major-General Khalil Jassim Dabbagh
- Arabic: اللِّوَاء خَلِيل جَاسِم الدَّبَّاغ
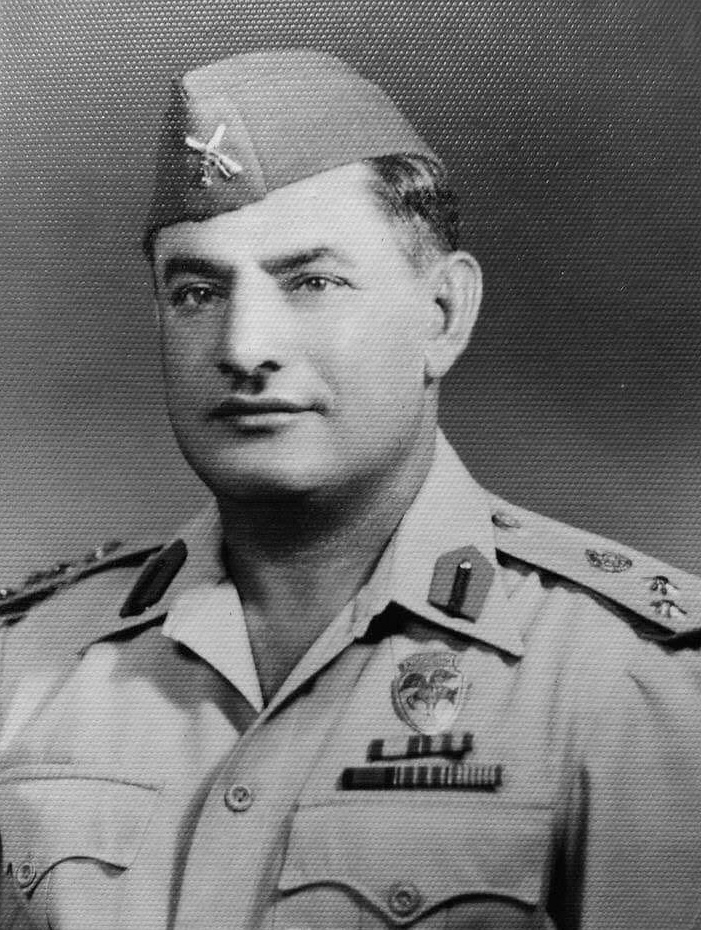
- Khalil Al–Dabbagh in 1963
- Born: Khalil Jassim Dabbagh; 1916; Mosul, Ottoman Empire
- Died: 1969 (aged 52–53); Iraq
- Education: Military School and Military College, Baghdad
- Military career
- Allegiance: Iraq
- Service: (Iraq) Iraqi Army
- Years active: 1940–1969
- Rank: Major-General
- Units: Light regiments (Jash), Iraqi commando units, Fourth Division
- Commands: Mosul zone, Light regiments, Iraqi commando units, Fourth Division
- Known for: 1948 Arab–Israeli War, campaigns against Kurdish rebels, foiling Arif Abd ar-Razzaq second coup (1966)
- Conflicts: World War II (Iraq campaign, 1943); Anglo-Iraqi War (1941); 1943 Barzani revolt – Northern Iraq/Kurdish insurgency; Third Barzani Movement – Northern Iraq/Kurdish insurgency; Fourth Barzani Movement – Northern Iraq/Kurdish insurgency; Iraqi Campaign on Alqosh (1963) – Against Kurdish rebels/Alansar; First Iraqi–Kurdish War (1961–1970); 1961–1965 Kurdish campaigns – Operations against Mustafa Barzani; 1948 Arab–Israeli War – Defense of Wadi Ara, Ar'ara, Palestinian regiments
- Other work: Training Arab officers from Libya, Jordan, Yemen; intelligence officer for Queen Alia brigade

Major-General Khalil Jassim Dabbagh (Arabic: اللواء خليل جاسم الدبّاغ; 1916–1969) was a senior officer in the early Iraqi Army. He served as commander of the Mosul military zone, commander of the Light Regiments (Jash), commander of Iraqi commando units (1963–1968), and commander of the Fourth Division (1966–1967).

Dabbagh is best known for his participation in the 1948 Arab–Israeli War, during which he commanded Iraqi forces in the 'Ara and Ar'ara sectors and conducted correspondence and negotiations with officers of the Israel Defense Forces. He was also involved in the organization of Palestinian auxiliary units during the war.

Between 1943 and 1969, Dabbagh took part in multiple military campaigns in northern Iraq against Kurdish insurgent movements, including the 1943 Barzani revolt and later phases of the Iraqi–Kurdish conflict. During the First Iraqi–Kurdish War, he commanded operations against forces loyal to Mustafa Barzani, including campaigns in 1961 and 1963, the Iraqi Campaign on Alqosh (1963) against Kurdish and communist Al-Ansar units, and the Amadiya campaign on 9 September 1965.

In June 1966, Dabbagh played a key role in thwarting the Arif Abd ar-Razzaq second coup against President Abdul Rahman Arif. He oversaw the arrest of Arif Abd ar-Razzaq and other coup participants at Mosul Airport.

== Early life ==
Khalil Jassim was born in 1916 at his home town in Mosul, Ottoman Empire from a family who had a long profession in leather-working, leather trade and merchandise, that brought the family name 'Al-Dabbagh' which means a leather smith or leather merchandise in Arabic. His father Jassim participated in WWI on the Iraq front with the Ottoman army, he was injured and lost one of his legs during the combat operations south of Baghdad and stayed about a week before he was rescued by a British patrol then sent to the British military hospital in Basra where he was treated from his wounds.

== Education ==
Khalil Jassim studied at the military school and military college in Baghdad. Graduated as a lieutenant at 1940, "graduation cycle 18 ".

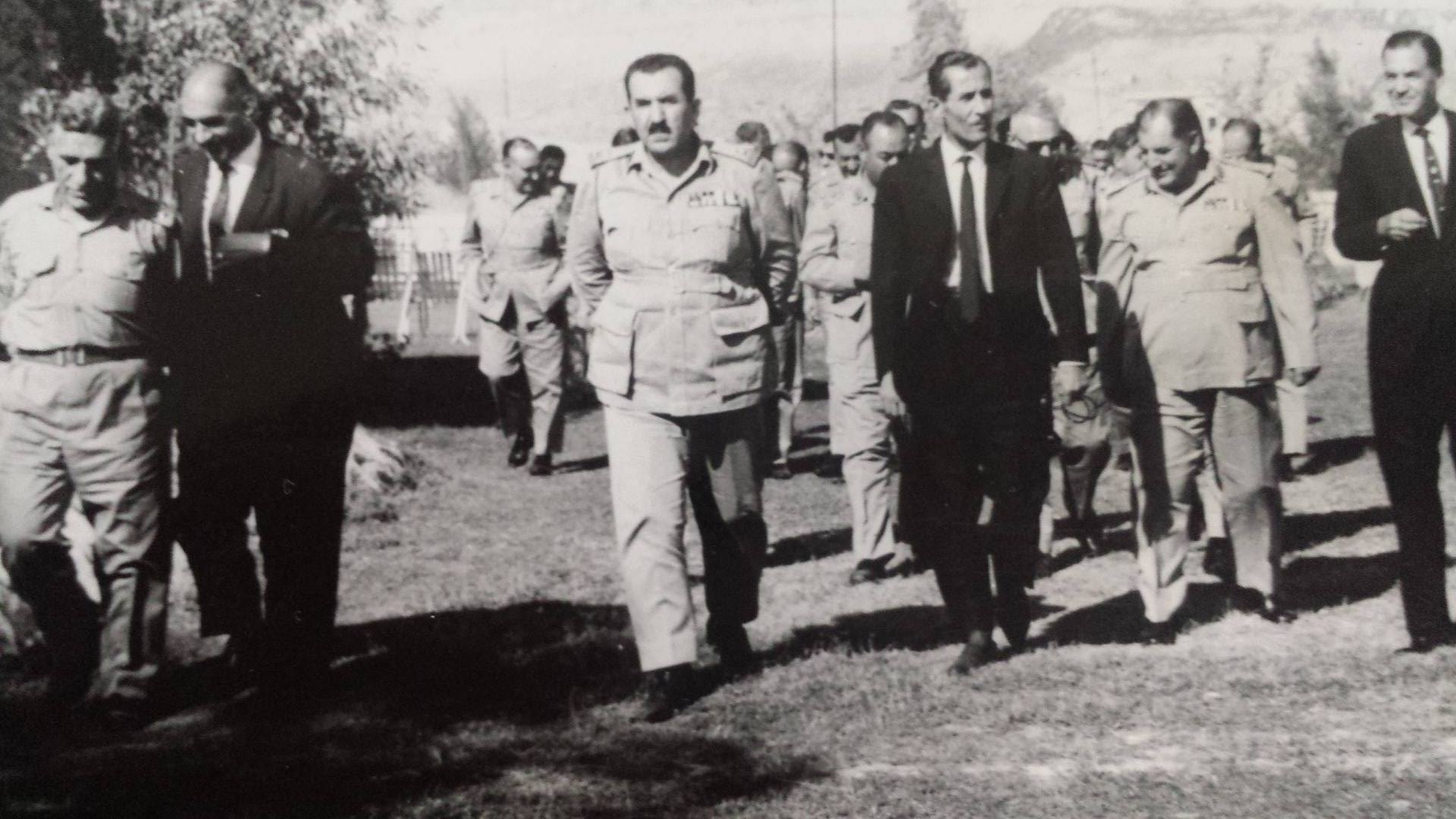
Iraq army senior Generals in 1960s at Gizlani military base in Mosul-Iraq, second from right, Khalil Dabbagh, Saeed Alshiekh, Abduljabar Shenshal, Abdul Razaq al-Saied Mahmood, Saeed Hammo, in the back also Kanaan Naif al-Malah and Saeed Salah Katan.

== Positions and achievements ==
The first participation of Khalil Jassim in combat was at the Anglo-Iraqi War when the coup of 1941 Iraqi coup d'état took place and followed by British air raids and attacks on the Iraqi army position near Habbaniya RAF Habbaniya. He rescued his unit from dying from thirst after they lost their directions in the Iraqi desert near Fallujah after the heavy air raids. He ran for a very long distance alone and reached to some Bedouins and asked them for help and water to rescue his unit which they complied and sent with him a couple of horses and camels with water. In 1943, 1945, and 1947, he participated in the war in the north against the Kurdish rebels, Tyari and other communist elements with a rank of first lieutenant then captain at that time at the 1943 Barzani revolt, Third Barazani Movement and Fourth Barazani Movement. This war was a guerrilla warfare kind of war, it gained him and other officers a lot of experience and made him one of the most reliable Iraqi generals that would take place in the struggle of fighting Kurdish rebels and peshmerga in the future. He served with other Iraqi senior leaders in the north such Omer Ali and Gazi Al-Dagistani and others. He was involved in training many Arab officers from Libya, Jordan and Yemen, and exchanging the expertise with the Yemenis early officers who visited Iraq at that time in the Yemenis expedition 1947 led by Colonel Ahmed Al Thulya 'Later the leader of Yemen revolution 1955' to gain expertise from the Iraqi officers, who had gained this experience from the constant mountain guerrilla warfare.

He participated in WWII with the Iraqi army when Iraq declared war on the Axis powers in 1943 after cutting diplomatic ties. The Iraqi army played a role in protecting the logistic routes of the Allies, especially the military aid to the Soviet Union which used to arrive from Basra, Baghdad and Kirkuk.

In 1948–49, Iraq sent part of its forces to defend the Arab villages in the West Bank at the 1948 Arab–Israeli War. Gazi Al-Dagistani appointed him as the leader of Wadi Ara and Ar'ara, then he became in charge of all the villages and towns in the region including Ara and Ar'ara, Ijzim and many other villages and towns. He was well known to the Israeli officers as he led many negotiations with them. and he organized the area defence in a way that David Ben-Gurion mentioned later after the war that the Israeli army and Alexandroni Brigade particularly, was unable to capture Wadi Ara and Ar'ara due to the strong defences in that region, which was obviously under Khaleel Jassim's leadership. Yet the Iraqi forces were replaced by the Jordanian forces later in 1949, and Jordan had to sign 1949 Armistice Agreements that gave Israel the control for those lands. He led many successful negotiations with the Israeli officers in the presence of Palestinian leaders in that region and helped the refugees to resettle. And his efforts were very much appreciated in that war by his commanding officers such as Omer Ali, and Gazi al-Dagistani and others. Also he was in charge of the Palestinian regiments and helped establish them such as Al-Karmel regiment which was financed and trained by the Iraqi army and other Arab nations, what came later to be known as the PLO.

After the war, he was promoted as major then lieutenant colonel. He was appointed as an intelligence officer for the Queen Alia brigade in Baghdad and helped to establish the first royal special forces. Later, in 1954, there was flood which hit Baghdad and Iraq in general. The army was called to rescue, and Khalil Jassim was one of those who participated in the flood relief. Khalil Jassim had no political activity in Iraq his loyalty was to the military establishment and to the country during all his military career. He did not participate in any of the coups or so called revolutions that the Iraqi army participated in, although he had very strong ties and connections to Abdul Salam Arif and other officers who took part in the struggle for power in Iraq before or after 14 July Revolution, The Iraqi army and army officers during their struggle for power were involved in many other movements after the overthrown of the monarchy such as 1959 Mosul uprising, Ramadan Revolution, Arif Abd ar-Razzaq first coup, and 17 July Revolution, he did not participate in any of those. Yet he played a major role in November 1963 Iraqi coup d'état when the army moved to clear the Ba'ath party militia from Baghdad districts, and he played also a major role in foiling Fayda movement 1963 and Arif Abd ar-Razzaq second coup 1966 and was able to capture the former prime minister who led the coup in Mosul airport .

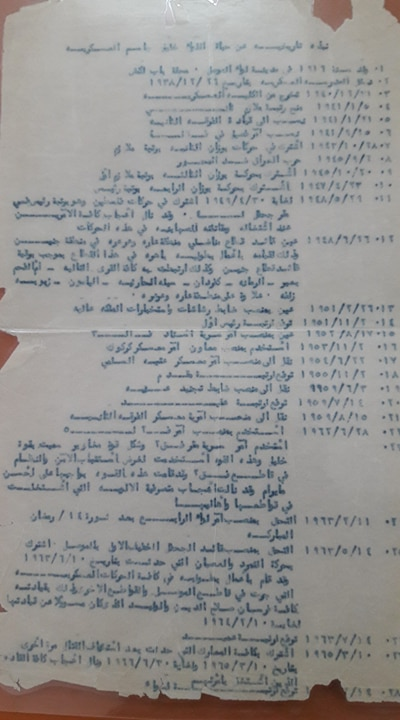
Khalil Jassim line of achievements according to the defence ministry

== Kurdistan Iraq war 1960–1970 ==
Between 1961 and 1970 and after, general Abd al-Karim Qasim and his officers succeeded in their 14 of July 1958 Movement and the overthrow of the monarchy in Iraq. They pardoned Mulla Mustafa Barzani and agreed to bring him back from his exile in Soviet Union where he had resided since his defeat against the Iraqi and Iranian armies in 1943, 1945, 1947, at The second Barzani movement, The third Barzani movement. So he came back to Iraq with 600 of his followers and they were received as heroes in all the parts of Iraq. Yet, the honeymoon didn't last long between the government and the Barzani who asked for high demands which resulted of Qassim government refusal and soon they returned to arm and guerrilla warfare in the north of Iraq in 1961.

The Qasim government and later Abdul Salam Arif once again had to send the experienced Iraqi officers in the north to face the Kurdish movement, but this time the war was more bloody and brutal, and the Kurds received arms and logistic support from both Iran and Israel which made the operations for the Iraqi army harder specially when they were also communist elements that supported the Kurdish movement represented by Toma Tommas and others. Khalil jassim, was one of the key Iraqi officers in the north and he helped to establish the light regiments which are regiments consisted of Kurds who are loyal to Iraq government and opposing Barazani. Also, some regiments consist of other minorities in Iraq such as Assyrians and Yezidis, those regiments were named as Fursan salah alDien, and Fursan khalid bin al waleed, or what they used to be called as Jash or chatta. Also, he led many campaigns in the region such as the Iraqi campaign on Alqosh in June 1963, the campaign on Amadiya 1965, and he succeeded to restore the order in that region. He also led many other campaigns on Ain Zalah, Ankawa and also Rawandiz where the Barazani forces had sieged a large Iraqi force under the command of Saeed Hammo for more than two months were Khalil Jassim alongside the Kurdish Jash forces managed to break the siege and rescue the garrison. And he was described by a hero from Mustafa Barzani many times, during the negotiations with Iraqi government which happened every now and then although they were enemies on the battlefield.

After the Ba'ath Party second coup in 1968, Khalil Jassim went to retirement, but he died shortly afterwards in 1969. Later, there was a major purge against many Iraqi officers by the Baathist regime, and there was a last attempt to restore president Arif to power that was made by some of the army officers that saw danger from the Bath party coming to power and leading Iraq into dictatorship but this attempt failed to exist due to Khalil Jassim early death in 1969.

== Arif Abd ar-Razzaq second coup ==
In June 1966 The former Iraqi prime minister Arif Abd ar-Razzaq and a group of Iraqi air force pilots with support from Syria and Egypt participated in a military coupe Arif Abd ar-Razzaq second coup to overthrow Iraqi president Abdul Rahman Arif after their first fail coup attempt to overthrow Abdul Salam Arif in 1965. They bombed many Iraqi military bases and air fields and tried to control of Mosul military bases and barracks including Al-ghizlani. The Iraqi president called Major General Khalil Jassim and colonel Abdul kareem Shindana and asked them to control the situation there and stop the air attacks on Iraqi military facilities. Khalil Jassim was head of the commandos Unit of the fourth Iraqi division at the time. He took control of Mosul military base and airport with assistant from Shindana and arrested all the pilots after dragging some of them from the planes while they attempt to flee. They were all arrested and sent back to Baghdad and thus the coup came to complete failure. Later after many years Khalil Jassim grandson Ghaith Khalil was targeted by some officers and pilots who were still loyal to Arif Abd ar-Razzaq in a Bedouin-political revenge with multiple assassination attempts which took place in Baghdad, Iraq between 1993 and 2000. Including colonel pilot Fahad Abdul khaliq and Mumtaz Al-Sadoon who were grandson of former prime minister Abdul-Muhsin Al-Saadoun and Arif Abd ar-Razzaq loyalist from the Egyptian Nasiri Arabian political movement who adopt the Arabian nationalist ideology of the Egyptian former president Gamal Abdel Nasser. Again Khalil Jassim grandson Ghaith Khalil with help of his grandfather comrade in arms was able to foil all their assassination attempts despite his young age and arrest one of the pilot officer Colonel Ahmed Fahad Al-Sadoon Son of colonel pilot Fahad Al-Sadoon who were also arrested in 1966 coupe as well as their cousins such Colonel Mumtaz Al-Sadoon and their sons, also some relatives to the former Iraqi prime minister Pilot Major-General Arif Abd ar-Razzaq. Later during the struggle Colonel Ahmed Fahad Al-Sadoon life was speared, when he Sought protection from Ghaith Khalil. The group of Iraqi army officers who came to aid their comrade in arms Khalil Jassim grandson were General AL-Ansari, the well known senior Iraqi General Saeed Hammo and their officers sons General Suhil Hammo.

== Orders and Medals ==
Khalil Jassim received many orders and medals such as the Iraqi Order of Two Rivers and the Iraq Republican Order first class, Iraqi Bravery Medal many times after foiling Arif Abd ar-Razzaq second coup, the Rescue Medal, World War II Iraqi Medal, Iraqi WWII Victory Medal, Iraqi Service Medal, the coronation Medal, 1948 Palestine War Medal, 1941 May Movements Medal, Corporation 1967 Medal. After his death, he was awarded the Iraqi Army Golden Jubilee Medal, the Peace Medal, and the 18 November Movement Medal for participating in the November 1963 Iraqi coup d'état. Also, he received medals which were awarded to most of the officers in the Iraqi army such as the 14 July Revolution Medal, the Ramadan Revolution Medal and the 17 July Revolution Medal; yet, he did not participate in any of those movements or coups.

== See also ==
- Iraqi Kurdistan
- Anglo-Iraqi War
