= 1966 Iraqi coup attempt =

1966 coup d'état attempt in Iraq

1966 Iraqi coup d'état attempt
- Part of the Arab Cold War
Date	29 June 1966
Location	Republic of Iraq
Result	Coup suppressed

Belligerents
Republic of Iraq	(Iraq) Iraqi Armed Forces rebels Supported by: Egypt

Commanders and leaders
(Iraq) Abdul Rahman Arif (Iraq) Abd al-Rahman al-Bazzaz	(Iraq) Arif Abd ar-Razzaq (Iraq) Subhi Abdul Hamed

Units involved
(Iraq) Khaleel Jassim (Iraq) ِAbdulkareem Shindana	(Iraq) Younis Attar Bashi

Strength
Unknown	Unknown

Casualties and losses
83	250

In 1966, the previous Iraqi prime minister Arif Abd ar-Razzaq and other Iraqi air force and army officers attempted to overthrow the Iraqi president Abdul Rahman Arif and the prime minister of the Iraqi government Abd al-Rahman al-Bazzaz. The attempt was supported by Egyptian president Gamal Abdel Nasser, following his first failed attempt against Abdul Salam Arif in 1965. The coup was foiled in Mosul by Khaleel Jassim and his Iraqi commando unit.

== 1966 Iraqi coup d'état attempt ==
Arif Abd ar-Razzaq and a number of his group of Iraqi officers entered Iraq borders through Kuwait with assistant of a Syrian officer Abdul Waham Al Khateeb who has links to the Syrian government and he escaped to Syria later after the failed attempt two weeks after the coup. They contacted Brigadier general Younis Atar Bashi who was the commander of the Iraqi fourth division in Mosul to support them in their attempt. He hesitated at the beginning but agreed later to corporate with the conspirators in order to overthrow the government and take control of the fourth division in Mosul and the city Airport. They conspirators received also support from the Iraqi embassy in Cairo, Egypt Ali Hussain. The planes took off from the Mosul airport and bombed Baghdad and the Iraqi republican Palace with three air raids, two airplanes for each raid. Another plane landed in Habbaniyah air base while four other planes landed in al-Rashed military base near Baghdad, and other planes attacked al-Washash military base. Another force attacked the Iraqi Radio station in Baghdad but they failed to control it for some reason. Eight people were killed and 15 wounded as a result of the bombing. At this time, Iraqi president Abdul Rahman Arif phoned Major General Khaleel Jassim, the commander of Mosul district and Iraqi Commandos Units in Mosul headquarters, asking for help to stop the air raids and take control of the Iraqi units there, as there was no response from the other senior officers who were in charge of the fourth division. Khaleel Jassim promised to ease the situation and arrest the conspirators. He attacked the Mosul air base with his eponymous commando unit, the "Khaleel Jassim Unit", and took control of the Ghazalni military base and restored order there. He then captured the conspirators, including Arif Abd ar-Razzaq. At the same time, the Brigadier Slaibi Aljumaili, a pro-Arif officer, took control of the Baghdad TV station that the conspirators tried to occupy.

== Aftermath ==
The coup lead to political and military instability in Iraq, which lead to the overthrow of president Abdul Rahman Arif two years later in 17 July Revolution or movement. All the conspirators were jailed for a short period of time then released, including Arif Abd ar-Razzaq, while Younis Atar Bashi and some other officers were put to retirement, and the fourth division commander was released from his command and replaced by Khaleel Jassim for a short period of time, then by Khaleel Jassim, and then by Abdul Jabbar Khalil Shanshal.

== The failure of Bedouin-political revenge attempts between 1993–2000 ==
Later after many years Khalil Jassim grand son Ghaith Khalil was targeted by some officers and Air Force pilots who were still loyal to Arif Abd ar-Razzaq in a Bedouin-political revenge with multiple assassination attempts which took place in Baghdad, Iraq between 1993–2000, and Sharjah in United Arab Emirates Between 2004-2006 Including colonel pilot Fahad Abdul khaliq and Mumtaz Al-Sadoon who were grandson of former prime minister Abdul-Muhsin Al-Saadoun and Arif Abd ar-Razzaq loyalist, officers and pilots from the Nasiri Arabian political movement who adopted the Arab nationalist ideology of the Egyptian former president Gamal Abdel Nasser. Again Ghaith Khalil, with help of his grandfather comrades in arms, was able to foil their assassination attempts despite his young age and arrest one of the pilot officers Major Ahmed Fahad Al-Sadoon, son of Colonel pilot Fahad Al-Sadoon, who was also arrested in 1966 coup, as well as their brothers and cousins, such as Colonel Mumtaz Al-Sadoon, and their sons, and also some relatives of the former Iraqi prime minister Colonel pilot Arif Abd ar-Razzaq. Later during the struggle Colonel Ahmed Fahad Al-Sadoon's life was spared, when he sought protection from Ghaith Khalil. The attempts continue to occur in Dubai, UAE in exile with failure again. The group of Iraqi army officers who came to aid their comrade in arms Khalil Jassim's grandson Ghaith Khalil, were General al-Ansari, the well known senior Iraqi general Saeed Hammo, and their officer son General Suhil Hammo.
