= Iraqi Republic =

Iraqi Republic may refer to:

- The Republic of Iraq, a country in the Middle East
- Iraqi Republic (1958–1968), a former state that existed from 1958 to 1968
- Ba'athist Iraq, formally the "Iraqi Republic", existed from 1968 to 2003
