= Arif Abdul Razzaq =

Iraqi politician (1921 – 2007)

Brigadier Arif Abdul Razzaq
- عارف عبد الرزاق
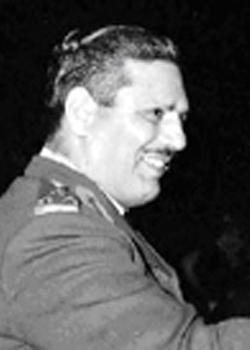
- Arif in 1966

Prime Minister of Iraq
- In office 6 September 1965 – 17 September 1965
- President: Abdul Salam Arif
- Preceded by: Tahir Yahya
- Succeeded by: Abd ar-Rahman al-Bazzaz

Minister of Agriculture
- In office November 1963 – March 1964
- Prime Minister: Tahir Yahya

Personal details
- Born: 1921 Kubaysah, Mandatory Iraq
- Died: 30 March 2007 (aged 86) Reading, Berkshire, United Kingdom
- Party: Arab Socialist Union; Arab Nationalist Movement
- Children: Rafi Razzak
- Profession: Combat pilot Politician

Military service
- Allegiance: Kingdom of Iraq (1939–1958); Iraqi Republic (1958–1965; 1967)
- Branch/service: Iraqi Air Force
- Years of service: 1939–1967
- Rank: Brigadier
- Commands: Commander-in-Chief of the Iraqi Air Force
- Battles/wars: Second World War; First Arab-Israeli War; 1958 Iraqi coup d'état First Iraqi-Kurdish War; Ramadan Revolution; Six-Day War

Arif Abdul Razzaq (Arabic: عارف عبد الرزاق; 1921 – 30 March 2007) was an Iraqi military officer and politician who served as the Prime Minister of Iraq for 11 days in September 1965. On September 17, he fled to Egypt after participating in a failed coup d'état against President Abdul Salam Arif. On 12 June 1966, he led another unsuccessful attempt to overthrow the new government of Premier Abdul Rahman al-Bazzaz and President Abdul Rahman Arif.

== The Man of Coups in Iraq ==
He participated in most of the coups which occurred in Iraq during his military service:

1. The 14th of July 1958 coup Although he was the pilot of the royal family at that time.
2. Ramadan Revolution 1963
3. November 1963 Iraqi coup d'état. From November 1963 until March 1964 he was Minister of Agriculture for Iraq. From March 1964 until July 1965 he was Commander of the Air Forces.
4. Arif Abd ar-Razzaq first coup 1965
5. Arif Abd ar-Razzaq second coup 1966 which was foiled in Mosul by Khaleel Jassim and Kareem Shindana.

Political offices
Preceded by Tahir Yayha	Prime Minister of Iraq; 1965	Succeeded by Naji Talib
