= First Republic of Iraq =

Period of Iraqi history from 1958 to 1968

Iraqi Republic الجمهورية العراقية (Arabic) کۆماری عێراق (Kurdish)
- 1958–1968
- Top: Flag (1959–1963); Bottom: Flag (1963–1968) Top: Emblem (1959–1965); Bottom: Emblem (1965–1968)
- Anthem: (1958–1965) موطني; Mawtini "My Homeland" (1965–1968) والله زمان يا سلاحي; Walla Zaman Ya Selahy "It has been a long time, oh my weapon!"
- Capital and largest city: Baghdad
- Common languages: Arabic and Kurdish
- Government: Unitary one-party parliamentary republic (1958–1963): under a military junta (1958–1963); under a military dictatorship (1963); Unitary one-party socialist state under a military junta (1963–1968)
- President
  - 1958–1963: Muhammad Najib
  - 1963–1966: Abdul Salam Arif
  - 1966: Abd al-Rahman al-Bazzaz (acting)
  - 1966–1968: Abdul Rahman Arif
- Vice President
  - 1963–1964: Ahmed Hassan al-Bakr
- Prime Minister
  - 1958–1963: Abd al-Karim Qasim
  - 1963: Ahmed Hassan al-Bakr
  - 1963–1965: Tahir Yahya
  - 1965: Arif Abd ar-Razzaq
  - 1965–1966: Abd al-Rahman al-Bazzaz
  - 1966–1967: Naji Talib
  - 1967: Abdul Rahman Arif
  - 1967–1968: Tahir Yahya
- Legislature: Revolutionary Military Council (1958–1965) National Defence Council (1965–1968)
- Historical era: Cold War; Arab Cold War
  - 14 July Revolution: 14 July 1958
  - 1959 Mosul uprising: 7–11 March 1959
  - Ramadan Revolution: 8–10 February 1963
  - Ar-Rashid revolt: 3 July 1963
  - Nasserist Counter-coup: 13–18 November 1963
  - Arif Abd ar-Razzaq first coup: 14 September 1965
  - Arif Abd ar-Razzaq second coup: 29 June 1966
  - 17 July Revolution: 17 July 1968
- Currency: Iraqi dinar (IQD)
Preceded by	Succeeded by
Arab Federation	Ba'athist Iraq
- Today part of: Iraq

The Republic of Iraq, retroactively known as First Iraqi Republic (Arabic: الجمهورية العراقية الأولى) and also as, Iraqi Republic, Qasimist Iraq (1958–1963) and Nasserist Iraq (1963–1968), was the Iraqi state created in 1958 under the rule of President Muhammad Najib ar-Ruba'i and Prime Minister Abdul-Karim Qasim. ar-Ruba'i and Qasim first came to power through the 14 July Revolution in which the Kingdom of Iraq's Hashemite dynasty was overthrown. As a result, the Kingdom and the Arab Federation were dissolved and the Iraqi republic established. Arab nationalists later took power and overthrew Qasim in the Ramadan Revolution in February 1963, and then Nasserists consolidated their power after another coup in November 1963. The era ended with the Ba'athist rise to power in a coup in July 1968.

Iraq was a unitary state with power centralised in the national government while it operated under the military regime, with the country additionally being under one-party rule as well.

== Territorial change ==
Iraq reverted to control over the territory of the former Kingdom of Iraq and Jordan again became an independent entity.

=== Territorial aims ===
Qasim specifically cited the north–south territorial limits from its highest point in the North and lowest point in the South, identified in the regime's popular slogan as being "From Zakho in the North to Kuwait in the South", Zakho referring to the border between Iraq and Turkey. The Qasim government in Iraq and its supporters backed Kurdish irredentism towards what they called "Kurdistan that is annexed to Iran", implying that Iraq supported the unification of Iranian Kurdistan into Iraqi Kurdistan. The Qasim government held an irredentist claim to Khuzestan. It held irredentist claims to Kuwait, at the time controlled by Britain until its independence in 1961.

== Culture ==
Abd al-Karim Qasim promoted a civic Iraqi nationalism that recognized all ethnic groups such as Arabs, Assyrians, Kurds, and Yazidis as equal partners in the state of Iraq, Kurdish language was not only formally legally permitted in Iraq under the Qassim government, but the Kurdish version of the Arabic alphabet was adopted for use by the Iraqi state and the Kurdish language became the medium of instruction in all educational institutions, both in the Kurdish territories and in the rest of Iraq. Under Qassim, Iraqi cultural identity based on Arabo-Kurdish fraternity was stressed over ethnic identity, Qasim's government sought to merge Kurdish nationalism into Iraqi nationalism and Iraqi culture, stating: "Iraq is not only an Arab state, but an Arabo-Kurdish state...[T]he recognition of Kurdish nationalism by Arabs proves clearly that we are associated in the country, that we are Iraqis first, Arabs and Kurds later". The Qassim government and its supporters supported Kurdish irredentism towards what they called "Kurdistan that is annexed to Iran", implying that Iraq held irredentist claims on Iran's Kurdish populated territories that it supported being united with Iraq. The Qassim government's pro-Kurdish policies including a statement promising "Kurdish national rights within Iraqi unity" and open attempts by Iraq to coopt Iranian Kurds to support unifying with Iraq resulted in Iran responding by declaring Iran's support for the unification of all Kurds who were residing in Iraq and Syria, into Iran. Qassim's initial policies towards Kurds were very popular amongst Kurds across the Middle East whom in support of his policies called Qassim "the leader of the Arabs and the Kurds".

Kurdish leader Mustafa Barzani during his alliance with Qassim and upon Qassim granting him the right to return to Iraq from exile imposed by the former monarchy, declared support of the Kurdish people for being citizens of Iraq, saying in 1958 "On behalf of all my Kurdish brothers who have long struggled, once again I congratulate you [Qassim] and the Iraqi people, Kurds and Arabs, for the glorious Revolution putting an end to imperialism and the reactionary and corrupt monarchist gang". Barzani also commended Qassim for allowing Kurdish refugee diaspora to return to Iraq and declared his loyalty to Iraq, saying "Your Excellency, leader of the people: I take this opportunity to tender my sincere appreciation and that of my fellow Kurdish refugees in the Socialist countries for allowing us to return to our beloved homeland, and to join in the honor of defending the great cause of our people, the cause of defending the republic and its homeland."

== Economy ==
Under the Qasim regime, the Iraqi government in its actions and documents on the economy promoted nine economic principles: (1) economic planning over the whole economy; (2) dismantling monopolies and strengthening the middle class; (3) liberating the economy from imperialism; (4) abolition of the land tenure system; (5) establishing trade with all countries; (6) closer economic ties with Arab countries; (7) expanding the public sector; (8) encouragement of the private sector; and (9) creating a higher rate of economic growth.

== History (1958–1968) ==
=== Precursor to republican revolution ===
==== Political problems ====
During and after World War II, the UK reoccupied Iraq due to the 1941 Iraqi coup d'état in which four nationalist Iraqi generals, with German intelligence and military assistance, overthrew Regent 'Abd al-Ilah and Prime Minister Nuri al-Said and installed Rashid Ali as Prime Minister of Iraq. Ali was eventually ousted by the British and 'Abd al-Ilah and al-Said retook power. In 1947, the Iraqis started to negotiate a British withdrawal, and finally negotiated the treaty at Portsmouth on January 15, 1948, which stipulated the creation of a British and Iraqi joint defense board that oversaw Iraqi military planning and British control of Iraqi foreign affairs.

==== Regional rivalries ====
Regional rivalries played a huge role in the 14 July Revolution. Pan-Arab and Arab Nationalist sentiment circulated in the Middle East and was proliferated by an anti-imperialist revolutionary, Gamal Abdel Nasser of Egypt. During and after World War II, The Hashemite Kingdom of Iraq was home to a number of Arab nationalist sympathizers. Arab nationalists viewed the Hashemite Monarchy as too beholden to British and Western interests. This anti-Hashemite sentiment grew from a politicized educational system in Iraq and an increasingly assertive and educated bourgeoisie. Iraqi Prime Minister Nuri al-Said expressed his interest in pursuing the idea of a federation of Arab States of the Fertile Crescent, and helped to create the Arab Federation of Iraq and Jordan, but reserved his enthusiasm about a Nasser espoused pan-Arab state. Al-Said joined the Arab league in 1944 on Iraq's behalf seeing it as a providing a forum for bringing together the Arab states, leaving the door open for a possible future federation. The charter of the League enshrined the principle of the autonomy for each Arab state and referenced pan-Arabism only rhetorically.

==== Economic issues ====
Iraq was left in ruins upon the conclusion of World War II, suffering from tremendous inflation and a subsequent plummet in living conditions. Prime Minister Nuri Al-Said and the Arab Nationalist regent, Abd al-Ilah, continually clashed on economic policy. Instead of cooperating to improve the quality of life for the Iraqi people and cut inflation, the Prime Minister and the regent could not agree on a cohesive economic policy.

==== Social unrest ====
Educated elites in Iraq began dabbling in the ideals espoused by Nasser's pan-Arabism movement. Within the officer corps of the Iraqi military, pan-Arab nationalism began to take root. The policies of Al-Said were disliked by certain individuals within the Iraqi military, and opposition groups began to form, modeled upon the Egyptian Free Officers Movement which had overthrown the Egyptian monarchy in 1952.

=== 14 July Revolution ===
On 14 July 1958, a group that identified as the "Free Officers", a secret military group led by General Abd al-Karim Qasim, overthrew the monarchy. This group was markedly Pan-Arab in character, with the exception of Abd al-Karim Qasim, who was an Iraqi Nationalist, which would later hurt his relations with his colleagues. King Faisal II, the Regent and Crown Prince Abd al-Ilah, and Nuri al-Said were all killed.

=== Domestic reforms ===
The Revolution brought Muhammad Najib ar-Ruba'i and Abd al-Karim Qasim to power. Qasim's regime implemented a number of domestic changes to Iraqi society.

=== Mosul Uprising ===
Opposition to Qasim from Arab Nationalist forces within the army culminated in the 1959 Mosul Uprising, which was an attempted coup launched with support from the United Arab Republic. Despite attracting support from local Arab tribes, the Mosul-based leadership of the coup was defeated in a number of days by loyal forces from within the Iraqi Army supported by the Iraqi Communist Party and local Kurdish tribes. Following the defeat of the coup Mosul was the scene of several days of unprecedented violence as all groups engaged in score-settling, using the post-coup chaos as a smokescreen, resulting in thousands of deaths.

Qasim's use of the Iraqi Communist Party to help put down the rebellion, and their growing strength within Iraq, convinced the Ba'ath Party in Iraq that the only way to stop the spread of the communists was to overthrow Qasim.

=== Ramadan Revolution ===
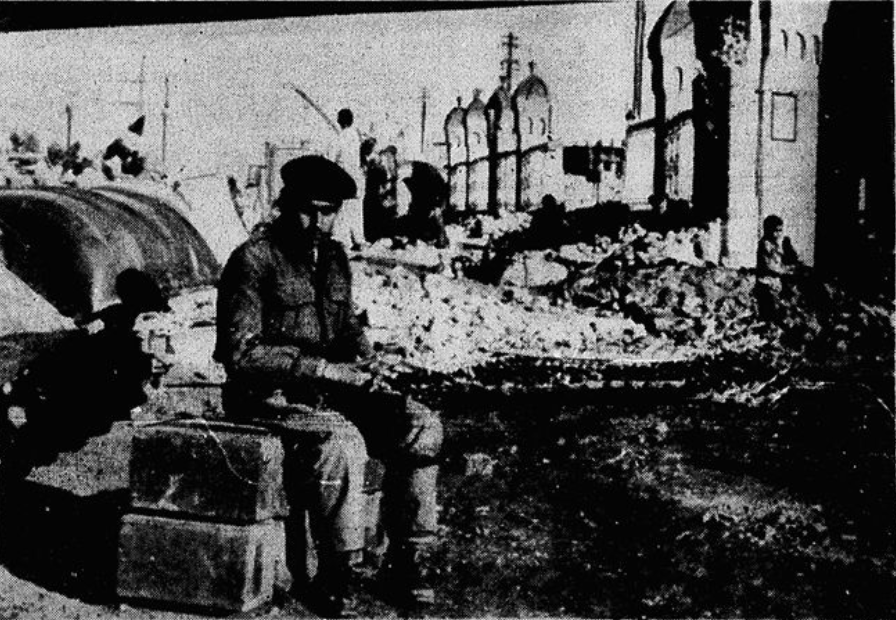
Soldier in the ruins of the Ministry of Defence in the aftermath of the Ramadan Revolution

On 8 February 1963, Qasim was overthrown by a coup led by the Arab Socialist Ba'ath Party of Iraq and sympathetic Arab Nationalist groups in the Iraqi Armed Forces. Qasim was unpopular in the Ba'ath Party and among Arab Nationalists largely for his focus on Iraqi Nationalism, as opposed to Arab Nationalism, and also because he was seen as being too close to the Iraqi Communist Party, which both groups viewed with a deep suspicion. Conflict between Qasim and certain officers of the Iraqi Armed Forces made them sympathetic to the idea of a coup.

Following Qasim's overthrow and execution members of the Ba'ath Party engaged in a house to house hunt for communists. Total deaths from the communist purge and the coup were around 5,000. In a September 1963 interview with Al Ahram, the Jordanian king Hussein - himself in contact with American intelligence services - stated that the CIA had provided the Ba'ath Party with a list of names and addresses of communists who were to be hunted down.

=== Ar-Rashid revolt ===
Although the Iraqi Communist Party had been greatly weakened by the anti-Leftists purges following the Ramadan Revolution, there still existed pockets of support for the party, particularly in Baghdad, which hosted some of the most militant party cells. A plan was eventually hatched and was put into action on 3 July 1963. The plan called for a mixture of 2,000 party members and rebel soldiers to take control over ar-Rashid army base in Baghdad, where 1,000 Qasim supporters and communists were being held, in the belief that the freed former officers could provide leadership and encourage other army units across Iraq to join the rebellion. The coup faced an unexpected level of opposition from the prison guards at the base, preventing them from releasing the officers and spreading the rebellion. The base was surrounded by forces from the Ba'ath Party National Guard Militia and the coup was put down.

=== Nasserist coup ===
Divisions between pro and anti-Nasser Ba'ath leaders, as well between right and left pan-Arab nationalists soon created new political instability. In November 1963 Nasserist elements in the government and the Iraqi Armed Forces overthrew the ba'athis government in a coup. The Ba'ath Party was banned, along with all other political parties in Iraq, and the nasserist Arab Socialist Union of Iraq was declared the only legal party in the Iraqi Republic.

Following the coup, President Abdul Salam Arif formed a new cabinet, mostly made of technocrats and Nasserist army officers. All banks and over thirty major Iraqi businesses were nationalized. Arif undertook these measures in an effort to bring Iraq closer with Egypt to help foster unity and on 20 December plans for union were announced; despite this, in July 1965, the Nasserist ministers resigned from the Iraqi cabinet.

=== Second Ba'athist coup ===
Salam Arif died in a plane crash on 13 April 1966 and was replaced by his younger brother Abdul Rahman Arif. A moderate, Rahman Arif formed a new cabinet led by Abd ar-Rahman al-Bazzaz, which turned the Iraqi regime to the centre, halting nationalizations and improving relationships with the United States of America. These positions irritated the Army and the radical Arab nationalists, who viewed it as a betrayal of the Revolution's principles.

On 17 July 1968, the Ba'ath Party, with the support of the Armed Forces, overthrew Rahman Arif in a coup and exiled him to Turkey. Ba'athist leader Ahmed Hassan al-Bakr was declared new President of Iraq; al-Bakr banned the Arab Socialist Union and declared the Arab Socialist Ba'ath Party the only legal party of the country, starting the rule of Ba'ath in Iraq.
