= November 1963 Iraqi coup d'état =

1963 pro-Nasserist coup in the Iraqi Ba'ath Party

- Part of The Cold War, the Arab Cold War
Date	13–18 November 1963
Location	Republic of Iraq
Result	Victory of Nasserist revolutionaries

Belligerents
Arab Socialist Ba'ath Party – Iraq Region	Nasserists

Commanders and leaders
Ali Salih al-Sa'di	Abdul Salam Arif; Abdul Rahman Arif

Strength
34,000 National Guard militia	

Casualties and losses
- 250 killed

The November 1963 Iraqi coup d'état took place between November 13 and November 18, 1963, when, following internal party divisions, pro-Nasserist Iraqi officers led a military coup within the Ba'ath Party. Although the coup itself was bloodless, 250 people were killed in related actions.

The government subsequently lasted until the 17 July Revolution in 1968.

== Background ==
After seizing Iraqi state power in February 1963, divisions between pro and anti-Nasser Ba'ath leaders, as well as between right and left pan-Arab nationalist Ba'ath leaders led to the first Ba'ath government in Iraq's collapse in November 1963, while 7,000 Iraqi communists remained imprisoned.

Abdul-Karim Qasim's former deputy Abdul Salam Arif (who was not a Ba'athist) was given the largely ceremonial title of President, while prominent Ba'athist general Ahmed Hassan al-Bakr was named prime minister. The most powerful leader of the new government was the secretary general of the Iraqi Ba'ath Party, Ali Salih al-Sa'di, who controlled the National Guard militia and organized a massacre of hundreds—if not thousands—of suspected communists and other dissidents following the coup.

al-Sa'di supported a union with Syria, while the more conservative military wing supported Qasim's "Iraq first policy". Factionalism, coupled with the ill-disciplined behaviour of the National Guard, led the military wing to initiate a coup against the party's leadership; al-Sadi was forced into exile in Spain. al-Bakr, in an attempt to save the party, called for a meeting of the National Command of the Ba'ath Party. The meeting exacerbated the Party's problems. Michel Aflaq, who saw himself as the leader of the pan-Arab Ba'athist movement, declared his intent to take control of the Iraqi Ba'ath Party. The "Iraq first" wing was outraged, President Arif lost patience with the Ba'ath, and the Party was ousted from government on 18 November 1963. The 12 Ba'ath members of government were forced to resign, and the National Guard replaced by the Republican Guard.

== Coup ==
On Tuesday, November 12, al-Sadi and 18 of his Ba'ath Party colleagues were seized at gunpoint and flown to Madrid. The next day, without mentioning al-Sadi, Radio Baghdad announced that the ruling Ba'athist Party was now led by a 15-member council headed by al-Bakr. A few minutes before 11:00, the radio went off the air and fighter jets strafed the Presidential Palace in Baghdad; large crowds of al-Sadi supporters demonstrated in Baghdad.

By the afternoon, Prime Minister al-Bakr's forces had reclaimed control. The next evening in Madrid, al-Sadi announced that eight of the new Ba'ath leaders had been ousted and flown to Beirut, and that al-Sadi would return to Baghdad with Syrian Ba'athists.

By Monday, November 18, Iraqi president Abdul Salam Arif, his brother, Brigadier General Abdul Rahman Arif, and their Iraqi Army supporters suppressed the Ba'ath National Guard Militia (which had increased in size from 5,000 to 34,000 between February and August 1963), and bombed the Ba'ath National Guard Militia headquarters. He did this while other senior officers and supporters of Abdul Salam Arif, such as Khaleel Jassim AlDabbagh, Saeed Hamo, Abdul Aziz Al Aqili and Younis Atar Bashi took control of the fourth and third divisions and suppressed the Ba'ath National Guard Militia in Mosul and Karkuk. Then he removed al-Bakr as Premier; al-Sadi was not included in the new council, and remained in exile.

As a result, the first Ba'ath government was overthrown and a new, pro-Nasserist government was established with Abdul Salam Arif as Head of State. The Arab Socialist Ba'ath Party of Iraq was banned, along with all other political parties, and the Arab Socialist Union of Iraq was declared the only legal party in the Iraqi Republic.

== See also ==
- 14 July Revolution
- July 1963 Syrian coup attempt
- List of modern conflicts in the Middle East
