= Saadi Toma Abbas =

25th Iraqi Minister of Defense (1939–2020)

Colonel General Saadi Toma Abbas سعدي طعمة عباس
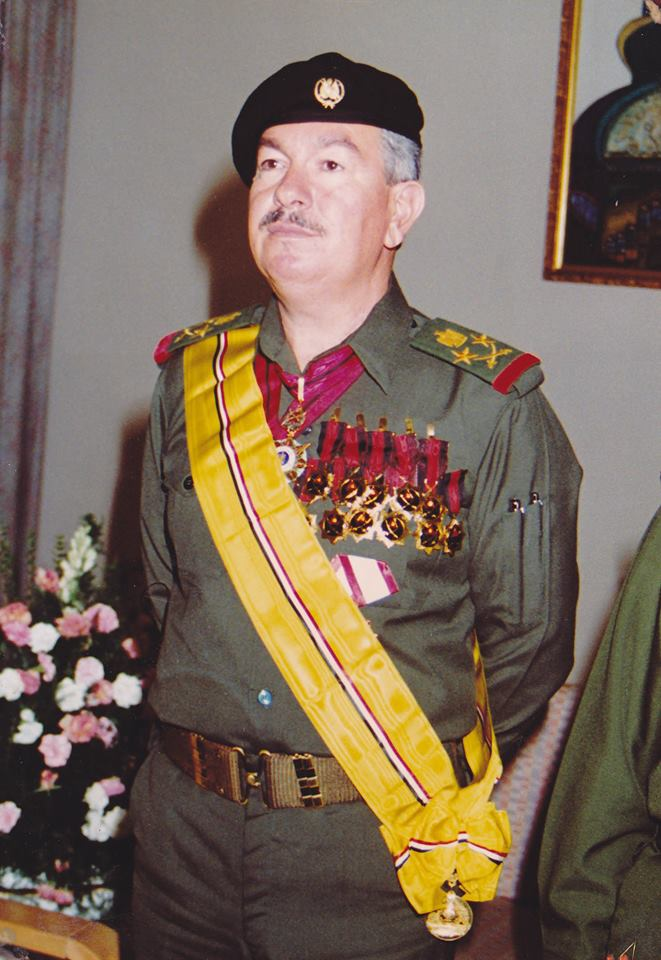

Minister of Defence
- In office 12 December 1990 – 6 April 1991
- President: Saddam Hussein
- Preceded by: Abdul Jabbar Khalil Shanshal
- Succeeded by: Ali Hassan al-Majid

Minister of Labor and Social Affairs
- In office 28 June 1998 – 28 June 2002
- Preceded by: Abdul Hamid Abdul Aziz Al-Sayegh
- Succeeded by: Munther Muzaffar al-Naqshbandi

Personal details
- Born: 17 March 1939 Baghdad, Kingdom of Iraq
- Died: 23 June 2020 (aged 81) Dhi Qar, Iraq
- Party: Arab Socialist Ba'ath Party

Military service
- Allegiance: Iraq
- Branch/service: Iraqi Army
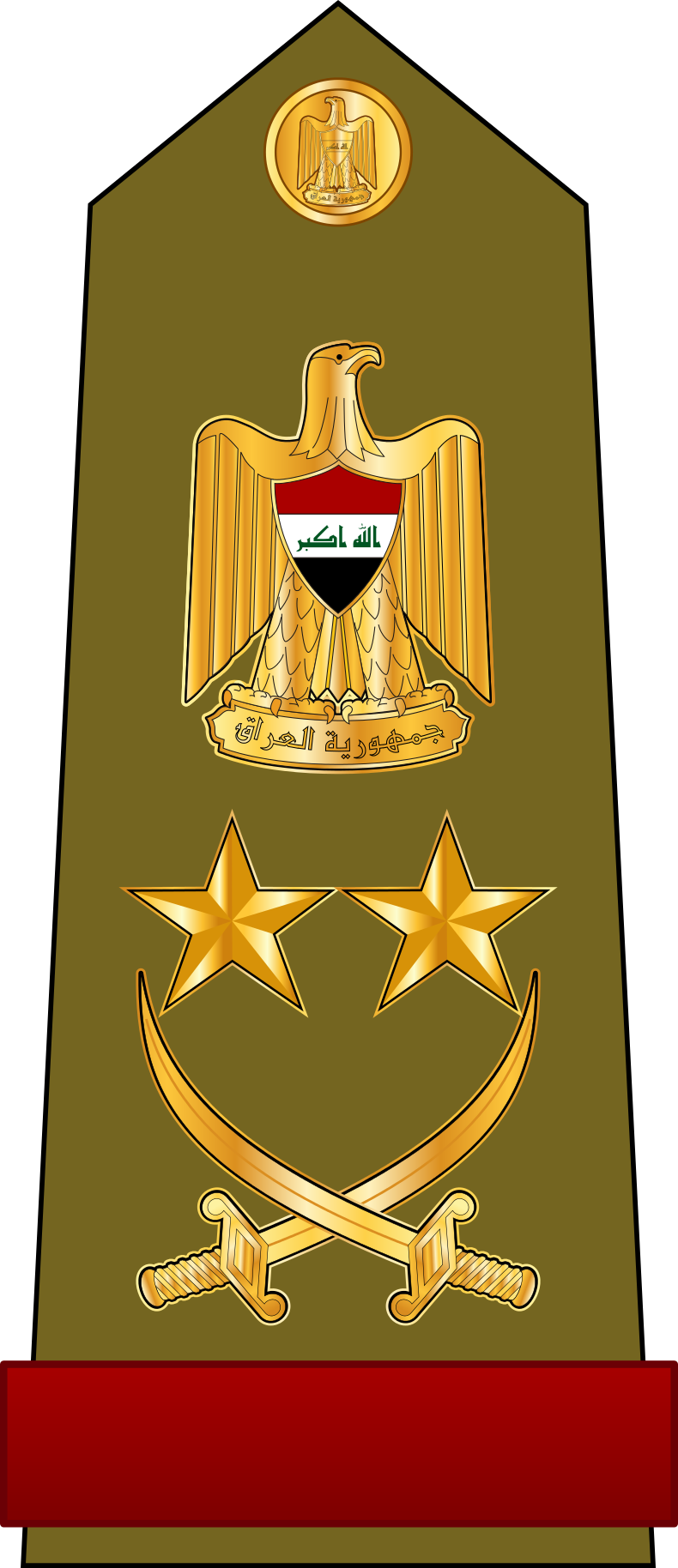
- Rank: Colonel General
- Battles/wars: Iran–Iraq War Gulf War; 1991 uprising in Iraq 2003 invasion of Iraq

Saadi Toma Abbas (Arabic: سعدي طعمة عباس; 17 March 1939 – 23 June 2020) was a former Iraqi military and politician. He was born in 1939 and held various ministerial positions during the rule of Saddam Hussein.

On 12 December 1990, he was appointed as Ministry of Defence and remained in office until 6 April 1991. He worked as military advisor at the Presidential Court from 6 April 1991 to 1998. In 1998 he was appointed Minister of Labor and Social Affairs and remained in his position until 29 June 2002.

He was arrested by the American forces on 18 May 2003.

== Trial ==
On 2 December 2008, the Iraqi Supreme Criminal Court sentenced him to 15 years in prison for suppressing the 1991 uprising in Iraq while he was serving as commander of the military forces in the southern region.

== Death ==
Saadi Toma Abbas died on 23 June 2020 in the Nasiriyah Central Prison.
