= 17 July Revolution =

1968 Ba'athist coup d'état in Iraq

- Part of the Arab Cold War
Date	17 July 1968
Location	Iraq
Result	Overthrow of Abdul Rahman Arif and Tahir Yahya; Establishment of Ba'athist Iraq

Belligerents
(Iraq) Iraqi Government: Arab Socialist Union	Iraqi Ba'ath Party (Iraq) Iraqi Armed Forces Supported by: United States (alleged; disputed)

Commanders and leaders
(Iraq) Abdul Rahman Arif (Iraq) Tahir Yahya	Ahmed Hassan al-Bakr; Saddam Hussein; Sa'dun Hammadi; Hardan al-Tikriti; Salih Mahdi Ammash (Iraq) Abd ar-Rahman al-Dawud (Iraq) Abd ar-Razzaq an-Naif

Units involved
Presidential Guard	10th Armoured Brigade; Jihaz Haneen

The 17 July Revolution (Arabic: انقلاب 17 تموز, romanized: inqilāb 17 Tammūz) was a bloodless coup in Iraq in 1968 led by Ahmed Hassan al-Bakr, Abd ar-Razzaq an-Naif, and Abd ar-Rahman al-Dawud that ousted President Abdul Rahman Arif and Prime Minister Tahir Yahya and brought the Iraqi Regional Branch of the Arab Socialist Ba'ath Party to power. Ba'athists involved in the coup as well as the subsequent purge of the moderate faction led by Naif included Hardan al-Tikriti, Salih Mahdi Ammash, and Saddam Hussein, the future President of Iraq. The coup was primarily directed against Yahya, an outspoken Nasserist who exploited the political crisis created by the June 1967 Six-Day War to push Arif's moderate government to nationalize the Western-owned Iraq Petroleum Company (IPC) in order to use Iraq's "oil as a weapon in the battle against Israel." Full nationalization of the IPC did not occur until 1972, under the Ba'athist administration. In the aftermath of the coup, the new Iraqi government consolidated power by denouncing alleged American and Israeli machinations, publicly executing 14 people including 9 Iraqi Jews on fabricated espionage charges amidst a broader purge, and working to expand Iraq's traditionally close relations with the Soviet Union.

The Ba'ath Party ruled from the 17 July Revolution until 2003, when it was removed from power by an invasion led by American and British forces. The 17 July Revolution is not to be confused with the 14 July Revolution, a coup on 14 July 1958, when King Faisal II was overthrown, ending the Hashemite dynasty in Iraq and establishing the Republic of Iraq, or the 8 February 1963 Ramadan Revolution that brought the Iraqi Ba'ath Party to power for the first time as part of a short-lived coalition government that held power for less than one year.

== Background ==
Under the Presidency of Abdul Rahman Arif, who assumed power following the death of his brother Abdul Salam Arif in April 1966, the United States (U.S.) and Iraq developed closer ties than at any point since the 14 July Revolution of 1958. The Lyndon B. Johnson administration favorably perceived Salam Arif's willingness to partially reverse ousted Prime Minister Abd al-Karim Qasim's expropriation of the United Kingdom (U.K.)-based Iraq Petroleum Company (IPC)'s concessionary holding in July 1965 (American firms owned 23.75% of the IPC), although the resignation of six Nasserist cabinet members and widespread disapproval among the Iraqi public forced him to abandon this plan, as well as pro-Western lawyer Abd al-Rahman al-Bazzaz's brief tenure as prime minister (which straddled the presidencies of both Arif brothers); Bazzaz attempted to implement a peace agreement with Iraqi Kurdish rebels following a decisive Kurdish victory at the Battle of Mount Handren in May 1966. (Under Qasim, Law 80 did not impact the IPC's ongoing production at Az Zubair and Kirkuk, but all other territories were returned to Iraqi state control. The July 1965 draft agreement between the IPC and oil minister Abdul Aziz al-Wattari would have allowed the IPC to regain majority control of North Rumaila.) Having established a friendship with U.S. ambassador Robert C. Strong prior to assuming the presidency and making a number of friendly gestures to the U.S. between April 1966 and January 1967, Western analysts regarded Arif as an Iraqi moderate. At Arif's request, President Johnson met five Iraqi generals and Iraqi ambassador Nasir Hani in the White House on 25 January 1967, reiterating his "desire to build an ever closer relationship between [the] two governments." According to Johnson's National Security Adviser, Walt Rostow, the United States National Security Council (NSC) even contemplated welcoming Arif on a state visit to the U.S., although this proposal was ultimately rejected due to concerns about the stability of his government. Prior to the outbreak of the Six-Day War, Iraqi Foreign Minister Adnan Pachachi met with a number of U.S. officials to discuss the escalating Middle East crisis on 1 June, including U.S. ambassador to the United Nations (UN) Arthur Goldberg, Under Secretary of State for Political Affairs Eugene V. Rostow, Secretary of State Dean Rusk, and President Johnson himself. The political atmosphere engendered by the costly Arab defeat prompted Iraq to break relations with the U.S. on 7 June, and ultimately ensured the collapse of Arif's relatively moderate government.

From at least mid-1965, the Shah's Iran, Israel, and the U.K.—motivated largely by the desire to contain Egyptian influence in the Persian Gulf—had sought to destabilize Iraq by supporting Kurdish rebels, which the U.S. refrained from doing at the time as the Kurdish war was considered unimportant to the broader Cold War with the Soviet Union. Senior Israeli official Uri Lubrani explained the strategy: "The Shah believed that his Israeli connection would provide a deterrent to Arab regimes [particularly Iraq] because it would create the impression that if an Arab state were to attack Iran, Israel would take advantage of this pretext to strike Iraq's western flank." While Nasserist elements had attempted to overthrow Arif as far back as Arif Abd ar-Razzaq's failed coup attempt in June 1966 (itself Razzaq's second attempt to wrest power from the regime), the Six-Day War compounded existing dissatisfaction within the Iraqi military and, combined with the stand-off with the Kurds, "had a profound impact on Iraq's political stability," in the words of Bryan R. Gibson. Similarly, Kanan Makiya writes that "The conjuncture around which Ba'thism took power was defined by the magnitude of the Arab defeat by Israel in June 1967. Political life was traumatized. ... All officer-led regimes [were] discredited." Like his brother, Arif previously tried to balance radical and moderate elements in Iraq and turned against the Nasserists after the Razzaq plot was exposed, but this balancing act was upended by the war as Arif moved to placate the ascendant Iraqi nationalists, notably by reappointing Tahir Yahya to the position of prime minister. Yahya had announced his intention to create a national oil company during his first premiership in late 1963, laying the groundwork for the founding of the Iraq National Oil Company (INOC) in February 1964. As described by Brandon Wolfe-Hunnicutt, Yahya's Law 11 "invested [INOC] with the power to exploit the Law 80 territories, either on its own or in association with other international companies—so long as INOC held a majority interest in any joint venture agreement." During his second term as prime minister from July 1967 to July 1968, Yahya moved to revitalize the INOC and sought to work with France and the Soviet Union to develop the technical capacity to nationalize the IPC outright, pledging to use Iraq's "oil as a weapon in the battle against Israel." Yahya's government concluded deals with the French to develop fields near Amarah in October–November 1967 and the INOC commenced drilling in North Rumaila in May 1968, bringing Iraq to the brink of nationalization. Additionally, Law 97 "permanently barred the IPC from operating in North Rumaila," per Wolfe-Hunnicutt.

In May 1968, the U.S. Central Intelligence Agency (CIA) produced a report titled "The Stagnant Revolution," stating that Iraqi government radicals, such as Yahya and INOC chairman Adib al-Jadir, sought "to get Iraqi control of oil production," and noting that "there is a possibility of an effort to change the present government by violence. Some part of the army would of necessity be involved in such an attempt perhaps a group allied with a pan-Arab organization, e.g., the Baʽth or the Arab Nationalists Movement." The document concludes that "While such a government might be more radical than the present one, deterioration of political affairs ... is improbable," thus historian Netanel Avneri comments that "it is likely that the desire to overthrow the Yahya government was seen in Washington as more important than the subsequent establishment of a more moderate regime." In June 1968, Belgian officials relayed a message from the U.S. State Department to Iraqi officials, offering to resume normal relations if Iraq agreed to provide compensation for damage to the U.S. embassy and consulate incurred during an earlier protest and met other conditions, including an end to the Iraqi boycott of U.S. goods and services imposed after the U.S. supported Israel during the Six-Day War; "There is no record of how the Iraqis responded to this information," although the Belgians "commented that the Iraqis would likely find the lifting of the boycott unacceptable."

== The coup ==
Planning for a coup against Arif and Yahya was underway at least from March 1968, when the topic was discussed at an "officer's convention" held at the home of prominent Ba'athist general Ahmed Hassan al-Bakr. The Ba'ath Party had previously organized a major demonstration against Arif in September 1967. On 17 July 1968 the Iraqi Ba'ath Party—led by al-Bakr as president, in collaboration with the non-Ba'athists Abd ar-Rahman al-Dawud as defence minister and Abd ar-Razzaq an-Naif as prime minister—seized power in a bloodless coup, placing Arif on a plane to London. al-Bakr quickly ordered Naif and Dawud to be removed from their posts and exiled on 30 July, cementing the Ba'ath Party's control over Iraq until the U.S.-led invasion in March 2003. al-Bakr was then named prime minister and commander-in-chief of the army. According to a semi-official biography, future Iraqi president Saddam Hussein personally led Naif at gunpoint to the plane that escorted him out of Iraq.

Many details of the coup remain unclear to historians. On the day of the coup, U.S. National Security Council member John Foster assessed that the new regime's "tendencies will be towards moving Iraq even closer to [the Palestinian] Fatah, the Syrians, and the Soviets," however the U.S. Embassy in Lebanon—"the principal source of political information on Iraq after the closure of the Baghdad Embassy during the June 1967"—indicated that the Iraqi Ba'athists were "from the right-wing of the party" and bitter rivals of their Syrian counterparts. Bakr and his foreign minister expressed an interest in closer cooperation with Turkey and Iran, and the U.S. Ambassador to Kuwait reported that the Kuwaitis "expected a more convenient administration in Iraq because the former Baʿth government had recognized Kuwait’s independence." The U.S. believed that Naif and Dawud—who were, respectively, in charge of President Arif's military intelligence and personal security—initiated the plot, and that Ba'athist conspirators including al-Bakr, Hardan al-Tikriti, and Salih Mahdi Ammash were only asked to participate in order to establish a broader coalition of support for a new government. However, Wolfe-Hunnicutt states: "Though executed by Nayef, the coup was organised by Bakr and his deputy Saddam Hussein." Both the Naif and Bakr factions were motivated by opposition to Yahya. After his ouster, Arif was exiled to the U.K., and even Yahya was not executed (although he endured brutal torture in prison), possibly to avoid the negative international attention that had resulted from the bloodletting that accompanied other changes of government in Iraq's contemporaneous history. In the ensuing years, Wolfe-Hunnicutt states that Saddam "succeeded in consolidating a formidable political regime ... where so many others had failed," including co-opting Yahya's intention to nationalize the IPC with the help of the Soviet Union.

=== Allegations of U.S. involvement ===
Wolfe-Hunnicutt states there was "a significant American role in the events that brought the Ba'th to power" in 1968. Similarly, historian Netanel Avneri "reveals findings that support the claim of American involvement in the overthrow of Arif"; the Arif government's desires "to break the Anglo-Saxon monopoly on Iraqi oil" and Soviet aid to Iraq gave the U.S. "a good reason to encourage the overthrow of the [Iraqi] government." Likewise, political scientist Tareq Ismael states that: "With further help from the U.S. the Ba'th returned to power in 1968." Wolfe-Hunnicutt concludes that the coup "at least initially" served U.S. interests in Iraq, and while "Certain American business groups did look with favour on the coup," there exists, "as yet, no evidence that these groups received official support from Washington," noting that "the evidence [...] suggests if the Central Intelligence Agency backed the coup, it did so [...] without proper authorisation or larger policy co-ordination." After the coup's success, "the new regime groped around unofficially for a renewed connection with the USA ... and to receive American financial aid," but when the new regime's officials, most notably defence minister al-Tikriti, attempted to re-establish relations with the U.S., "the Johnson administration repeatedly rebuffed" these overtures because of "divisions among policymakers" regarding how economic ties with Iraq might negatively affect U.S. relations with Israel. According to Gibson: "There is no evidence to substantiate claims that the United States was behind the coup."

After the coup's success, the Belgian embassy in Iraq, which hosted the U.S. interests section, reported that it was strongly rumoured that "Washington was behind the coup," noting that "Several ministers, especially the Prime Minister [Naif] were known to be 'pro-American.'" Robert Anderson—former U.S. Secretary of the Treasury during the Dwight D. Eisenhower administration and "CIA trouble-shooter" who took "the lead in Iraqi-American commercial relations" after the Ba'ath Party overthrow of Iraqi Prime Minister Abd al-Karim Qasim in 1963—maintained contact with Lutfi al-Ubaydi, "an Iraqi lawyer and politico with many friends within the Ba'th party," including serving as "an economic advisor and a close friend" to al-Bakr. Per Avneri, "While there is no evidence that Anderson operated under a government directive," Anderson maintained "continuous contact" with the U.S. State Department and Ubaydi, "an emissary of the regime that overthrew Arif." Declassified State Department records document that Anderson served as a channel of communication between the Ba'athists and the U.S. government; the Ba'athists even "sought to share its secretly made decisions about Yahya’s fate and the oil contract with France with the State Department through the medium of Anderson."

Former U.S. National Security Council (NSC) member Roger Morris wrote in The New York Times in 2003 that the coup "came with CIA backing," writing that "in the late 1960's, I often heard CIA officers—including Archibald Roosevelt, grandson of Theodore Roosevelt and a ranking CIA official for the Near East and Africa at the time—speak openly about their close relations with the Iraqi Baathists." One of the coup plotters, Naif, affirmed U.S. involvement in the coup years later, writing in his memoirs "for the 1968 coup you must look to Washington"; Naif was an associate of Sa'd Salih al-Jabr, an Iraqi exile who closely worked with Anderson and Ubaydi. Similarly, the ousted Arif would tell historian Hanna Batatu that "non-Iraqi hands" were involved in the coup. Iraqi opposition politician Ahmad Chalabi described the coup "as the second stage of CIA-Ba'ath cooperation." According to Chalabi, Saddam wrote a letter to the U.S. Consulate in Basra in 1966 asking for U.S. assistance in overthrowing the Iraqi government which culminated in a 1967 meeting arranged by Ubaydi between al-Bakr and Anderson. Regarding the coup, Adnan Pachachi—who served in the Iraqi government before and after the coup—stated that "I don’t know of outside involvement, but perhaps it happened. The regime of Prime Minister Taher Yahya was pro-Nasser and unpopular with the West. It would make sense." Gibson quotes a former high-ranking CIA officer: "I do not know how the rumor got started that we were involved in the Ba'thist coup. We weren't. ... [Arif] was the best of the lot."

== Aftermath ==
Estimates on the size of the crowds that came to view the dangling corpses spread seventy meters apart in Liberation Square—increasing the area of sensual contact between mutilated body and mass—vary from 150,000 to 500,000. Peasants streamed in from the surrounding countryside to hear the speeches. The proceedings, along with the bodies, continued for twenty-four hours, during which the President, Ahmed Hassan al-Bakr, and a host of other luminaries gave speeches and orchestrated the carnival-like atmosphere.

— Kanan Makiya describing the 1969 Baghdad hangings.

On 2 August 1968, Iraqi Foreign Minister Abdul Karim Sheikhli stated that Iraq would seek close ties "with the socialist camp, particularly the Soviet Union and the Chinese People's Republic." By late November, the U.S. embassy in Beirut reported that Iraq had released many leftist and communist dissidents, although "there [was] no indication ... [they had] been given any major role in the regime." As the previous government had recently signed a major oil deal with the Soviets, the Ba'ath Party's rapid attempts to improve relations with Moscow were not a shock to U.S. policymakers, but they "provided a glimpse at a strategic alliance that would soon emerge." Behind the scenes, Tikriti (now Iraqi minister of defence) attempted to open a discreet line of communication with the U.S. government through a representative of the American oil company Mobil, but this overture was rebuffed by the Johnson administration as it had come to perceive the Ba'ath Party, in both Iraq and Syria, as too closely associated with the Soviet Union.

For its part, the ruling Ba'ath Party in Syria did not welcome—or initially even acknowledge—the formation of a government by the rival Ba'ath Party in neighboring Iraq. In a press release, the Syrians mentioned that al-Bakr had been appointed president, but did not mention his party's affiliation, instead referring to the incident as a military coup. The Iraqis were more conciliatory, with al-Bakr stating "They are Ba'athists, we are Ba'athists" shortly after the coup. When Hafez al-Assad seized power in Syria in 1970, this did not lead to improved relations; to the contrary, the Syrians denounced the Iraqi branch of the party as a "rightist clique".

In December, Iraqi troops based in Jordan "made international headlines" when they began shelling Israeli settlers in the Jordan Valley, which led to a strong response by the Israeli Air Force. al-Bakr claimed that a "fifth column of agents of Israel and the U.S. was striking from behind," and, on 14 December, the Iraqi government alleged it had discovered "an Israeli spy network" plotting to "bring about a change in the Iraqi regime," arresting dozens of individuals and eventually publicly executing 14 people including 9 Iraqi Jews on fabricated espionage charges in January 1969. The executions led to international criticism, with U.S. Secretary of State William P. Rogers calling them "repugnant to the conscience of the world" and Egypt's Al-Ahram cautioning: "The hanging of fourteen people in the public square is certainly not a heart-warming sight, nor is it the occasion for organizing a spectacle." Makiya credits the hangings with helping the Ba'athist government consolidate control of Iraq, stating: "The terror that, from a Ba'thist viewpoint, was premature and badly handled in 1963, worked and was skillfully deployed the second time around." Makiya recounts how the Ba'athist purge quickly expanded far beyond Iraq's marginalized Jewish community: "In 1969 alone, official executions of convicted spies (or announcements of such executions) took place at least on the following days: February 20, April 14, April 30, May 15, August 21, August 25, September 8, and November 26. The victims now were Muslim or Christian Iraqis with the occasional Jew thrown in for good measure." In total, an estimated 150 people were publicly executed in Liberation Square, Baghdad from 1969 to 1970.

The plans, concepts, views, internal forces, and reserves we used up to the 1st of March 1973, the day on which the monopolistic companies knelt down and recognized our nationalization, are no longer enough to confront imperialism with its newly conceived and developed plans. ... Thus we prepared additional forces for which imperialism had not allowed in its plans. We can assure our patriotic brothers ... they will not make an Allende of us.—Saddam Hussein reflecting on the IPC nationalization in light of the 1973 Chilean coup d'état, 24 September 1973.

On 1 June 1972, under the direction of Saddam and oil minister Sa'dun Hammadi, Iraq announced Law 69: The nationalization of the Anglo-American shares of the IPC and their transfer to the INOC. (The French and Gulbenkian shares of the consortium followed in 1973.) This followed the April 1972 signing of the 15-year Iraqi–Soviet Treaty of Friendship and Co-Operation by al-Bakr and Soviet premier Alexei Kosygin. According to Charles R. H. Tripp, the Iraqi–Soviet Treaty upset "the U.S.-sponsored security system established as part of the Cold War in the Middle East," leading the U.S. to finance Mustafa Barzani's Kurdistan Democratic Party (KDP) rebels during the Second Iraqi–Kurdish War. From October 1972 until the abrupt end of the Kurdish intervention after March 1975, Gibson states that the CIA "provided the Kurds with nearly $20 million in assistance," including 1,250 tons of non-attributable weaponry.

While most studies credit the nationalization measures pursued by Muammar Gaddafi's Libya after September 1969 with setting the precedent that other oil-producing states would subsequently follow, Iraq's nationalization of the IPC was the largest such expropriation attempted since Iran's 1951 nationalization of the Anglo-Iranian Oil Company (AIOC), which the U.S. and U.K. successfully thwarted. The U.S. pursued a similarly reactionary policy towards Iraq's nationalization, believing that its Western allies would agree to embargo Iraqi oil to ensure that the nationalization failed and that its allies in the Organization of Petroleum Exporting Countries (OPEC)—namely Iran, Saudi Arabia, and Kuwait—would announce a commensurate increase in production. However, the U.S. position was an extreme outlier relative to international opinion and none of the U.S.'s traditional allies, including the U.K., were willing to countenance such measures. To the contrary, OPEC took decisive steps to ensure the success of Iraq's nationalization. The IPC consortium broke down and signed an agreement to resolve its outstanding disputes with Iraq on 1 March 1973, leading to celebrations in Baghdad. Wolfe-Hunnicutt observes: "Within a decade, all Middle Eastern producers followed Iraq's lead in seizing control of their oil resource from the major multi-nationals."

== Bibliography ==
- Gibson, Bryan R. (2015). Sold Out? US Foreign Policy, Iraq, the Kurds, and the Cold War. Middle East today. New York, NY: Palgrave Macmillan. ISBN 978-1-137-48711-7.
- Kienle, Eberhard (1991). Ba'th v. Ba'th: the conflict between Syria and Iraq, 1968-1989. London: I.B. Tauris. ISBN 978-1-850-43192-3.
