= Abdul Jabbar Shanshal =

24th Iraqi Minister of Defense

Colonel General Abdul Jabbar Shanshal
- عبد الجبار شنشل
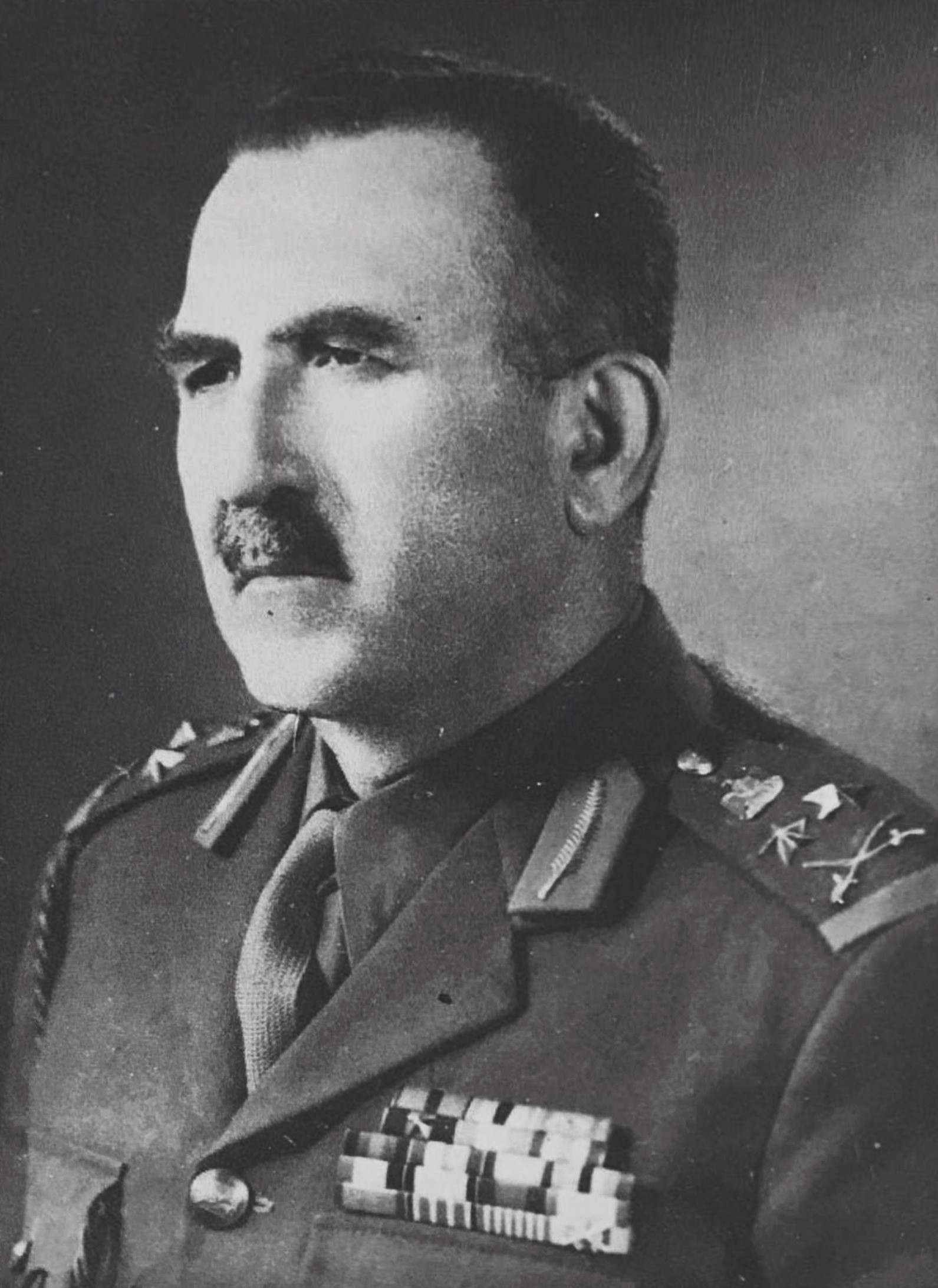

Minister of Defense
- In office May 1989 – December 1990
- Preceded by: Adnan Khairallah
- Succeeded by: Saadi Toma Abbas

Chief of the General Staff of the Army and the Armed Forces
- In office 1970–1984

Member of the Regional Command of the Iraqi Regional Branch

Personal details
- Born: عبد الجبار خليل شنشل البكري; Abdul Jabbar Khalil Shanshal al-Bakri; 1920 Mosul, Mandatory Iraq
- Died: 20 September 2014 (aged 93–94) Amman, Jordan
- Resting place: Iraqi Army Martyrs Cemetery
- Party: Iraqi Regional Branch of the Arab Socialist Ba'ath Party
- Parent: Hassan Abd al-Majid
- Nickname: "Abu Muthanna"

Military service
- Allegiance: Iraq
- Branch/service: Iraqi Army
- Years of service: 1940–2003
- Rank: General officer
- Battles/wars: Anglo-Iraqi War; 1943 Barzani revolt; 1948 Arab–Israeli War; First Iraqi–Kurdish War; Six-Day War; Yom Kippur War; Second Iraqi–Kurdish War; Iran–Iraq War; Gulf War

General Abdul Jabbar Khalil Shanshal al-Bakri (Arabic: عبد الجبار خليل شنشل البكري) (1920 – 20 September 2014) was an Iraqi general officer and minister, he held also the position of minister of military affairs and chief of staff.

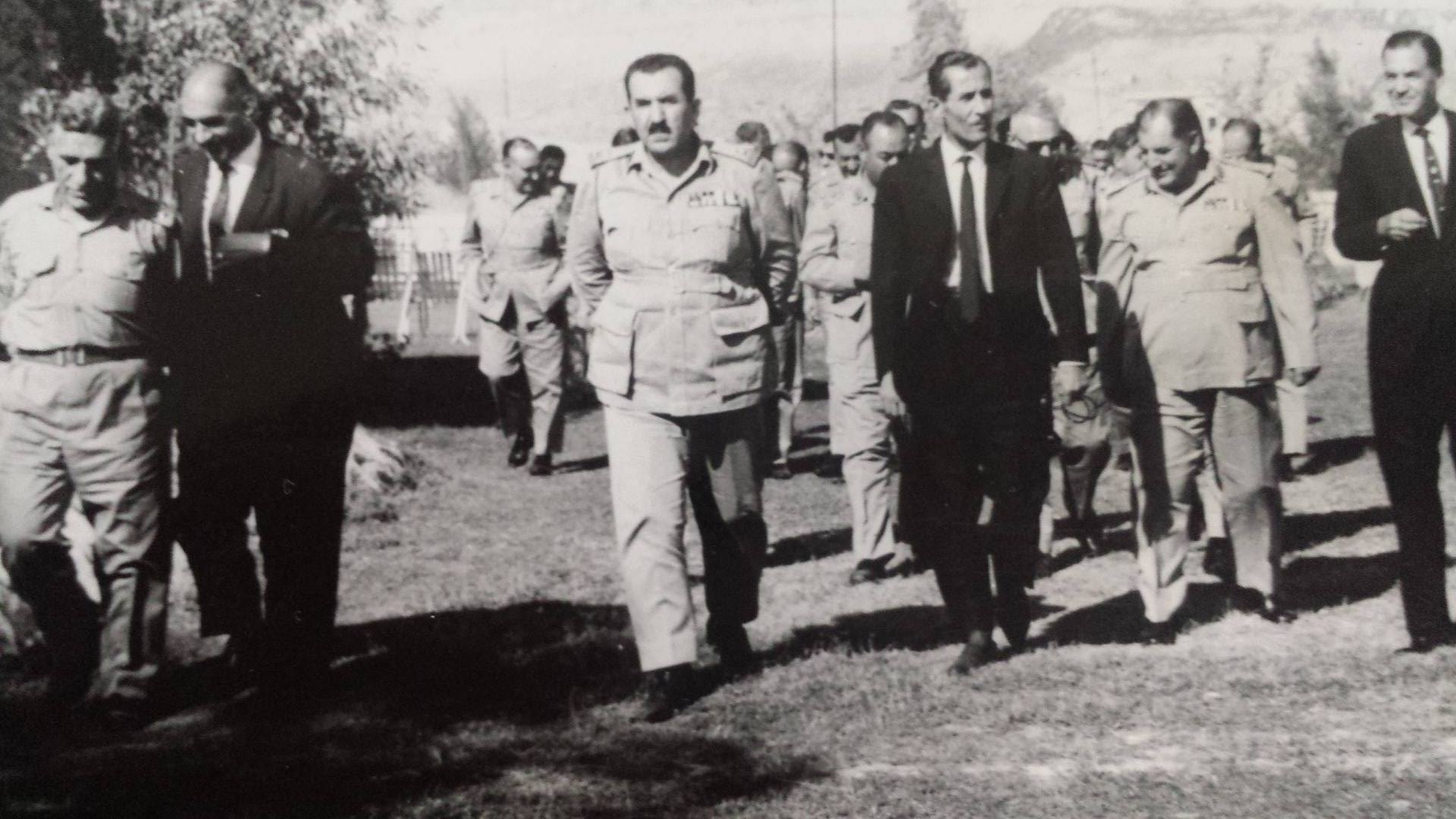
Iraq army senior Generals in the 1960s at the Gizlani military base in Mosul-Iraq, second from right, Khaleel Jassim, Saeed Alshiekh, Abduljabar Shenshal, Abdul Razaq al-Saied Mahmood, Saeed Hammo, in the back also Kanaan Naif al-Malah and Saeed Salah Katan.

He graduated from the Iraqi military college in Baghdad in 1940 (cycle 18).

In his early military life fought in 1941 against the British in the Anglo-Iraqi War and in 1948 against Israel as a junior officer.

He rose in the ranks to become Chief of Staff of Iraqi Armed Forces (1970-1984), supervised the expansion of the army from 6 to 60 divisions, led the 4th campaign against Kurdish insurgents in the 1970s, became minister of defense 1989 to 1991, served as military advisor until the 2003 US invasion of Iraq.

== Family background ==
His family descended from the Hanbali scholar of Baghdad Ibn al-Jawzi who in turn descended from Abu Bakr As-Siddiq's youngest son Muhammad ibn Abu Bakr.

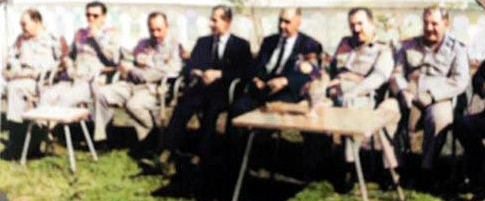
Mosul senior officers 1966, Khalil Jassim, Abduljabar Shanshal, Abd Alrazak, Saed Al sheik, Saed Qatan, Kanan Al Malah
