= Naji Talib =

Prime Minister of Iraq from 1966 to 1967

- ناجي طالب
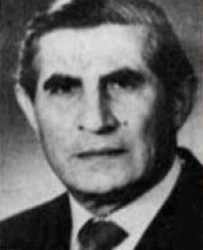

Prime Minister of Iraq
- In office 9 August 1966 – 10 May 1967
- President: Abdul Rahman Arif
- Preceded by: Abd ar-Rahman al-Bazzaz
- Succeeded by: Abdul Rahman Arif

Foreign Minister of Iraq
- In office 14 November 1964 – 6 November 1965
- President: Abdul Salam Arif
- Preceded by: Subhi Abdul Hamed
- Succeeded by: Abd al-Rahman al-Bazzaz

Personal details
- Born: 1 July 1917 Nasiriyah, Ottoman Empire
- Died: 23 March 2012 (aged 94) Baghdad, Iraq

Naji Talib (Note: Arabic: ناجي طالب, romanized: Nājī Ṭālib) (1 July 1917 – 23 March 2012) was an Iraqi politician who served as the prime minister of Iraq from 1966 to 1967, replacing Abd ar-Rahman al-Bazzaz.

== Early life ==
Talib was born in 1917 in Nasiriyah, Iraq. His family were from the landowning class in Iraq; his father was a landowner in and mayor of Nasiriyah and a member of parliament.

== Military career ==
Talib was educated at the British Military Academy from 1936 to 1939. During 1954 and 1955, he was stationed in London as a military attaché. In 1958, Talib's rank and post was that of Staff brigadier, commander, 15th Infantry Brigade, 1st Division, Basrah, and upon retirement from the army he had reached the rank of Major General.

== Political career ==
In 1956, Staff Colonel Naji Talib was the commandant of the Senior Officers School in Baghdad. During this year he proposed the immediate union of Iraq with the United Arab Republic upon an antagonistic intervention by any of the parties to the Baghdad Pact, The Supreme committee committed itself unanimously to the proposal. In 1957 Naji Talib became the second deputy chairman of the Free Officers Movement in Iraq. Naji Talib's role in government included taking up the positions of Minister of Social Affairs 14 July 1958 – 7 February 1959, Minister of Industries 1963, Minister of Foreign Affairs 1964–1965, and finally Prime Minister 9 August 1966 – 9 May 1967. Naji Talib later became a middle-of-the-roader after holding ministerial portfolios under Qasim and in the days of the Ba'th. While politically he wavered between an independent nationalist attitude and Nasserism, he had succeeded in remaining in all the good graces of all the contending military factions.

== Later activities ==
On 7 November 2004, a proposal was sent to then Secretary General of the United Nations, Kofi Annan, to form an Iraqi committee initiative on Falluja. The proposal stated that Talib was willing to become a member of an initiative which planned to start a series of visits to the town of Falluja, to conduct meetings with its inhabitants, combatants, and official police there to find a just solution to safeguard the town and its people from harm as well save the lives of occupation troops.

On 22 October 2005, Talib was acting as a negotiator for the Sunnis in Iraq.

He died on 23 March 2012, aged 94 in Baghdad.

== Notes ==
Political offices
Preceded by Abd ar-Rahman al-Bazzaz	Prime Minister of Iraq; 1966-1967	Succeeded by Abdul Rahman Arif
