= Tahir Yahya =

Iraqi politician and prime minister (1916–1986)

- طاهر يحيى
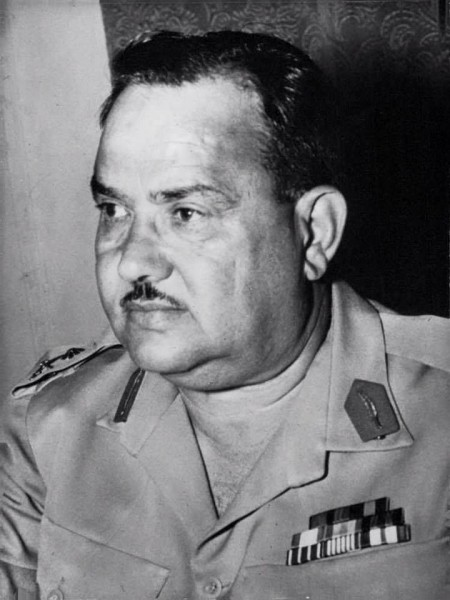
- Yahya in 1963

Prime Minister of Iraq
- In office 10 July 1967 – 17 July 1968
- President: Abdul Rahman Arif
- Preceded by: Abdul Rahman Arif
- Succeeded by: Abd ar-Razzaq an-Naif
- In office 20 November 1963 – 6 September 1965
- President: Abdul Salam Arif
- Preceded by: Ahmed Hassan al-Bakr
- Succeeded by: Arif Abd ar-Razzaq

Personal details
- Born: 1916 Tikrit, Ottoman Empire
- Died: 1986 (aged 69–70) Mansour district, Baghdad, Ba'athist Iraq
- Party: Arab Socialist Union
- Spouse: Ameena Rasheed
- Children: 7
- Profession: Military officer Teacher

Military service
- Allegiance: Iraq
- Branch/service: Iraqi Army
- Years of service: 1946–1968
- Rank: Lieutenant General
- Battles/wars: First Arab-Israeli War 14 July Revolution Six Day War

Tahir Yahya (Arabic: طاهر يحيى; 1916–1986) was Prime Minister of Iraq twice, from 1963 to 1965 and a short term in 1967 to 1968. He was educated at the Baghdad Military College and the Staff College. Born in Tikrit 1916, he was the 4th child to Mulla Yahya el-ogaily, a prominent tobacco merchant between North and Central Iraq. At the age of sixteen, he joined the Baghdad Teachers College, then became a teacher in Baghdad for one year after graduation. He then pursued further education in military sciences. He was a cavalry officer and played polo for the Iraqi army. He led the Iraqi armored company where he was wounded in the battle at the Kfar Masaryk, earning two medals bestowed by Crown Prince Abd al-Ilāh.

In November 1963 he was appointed as prime minister by President Abdul Salam Arif.

At the end of his term, Yahya warned president Arif of the upcoming Ba'ath coup d'état and their plans to overthrow his government, but Arif did not take any action. This led to Yahya submitting his resignation on 8 July 1968, one week before the coup d'état took place. That same morning Yahya was arrested and Arif was deported to London.

Yahya spent three years in prison, torture, and health neglect. In 1971 he was released, only to be put under house arrest until dying in his house in Mansur, Baghdad, in 1986.

Political offices
Preceded by Ahmed Hassan al-Bakr	Prime Minister of Iraq; 1963-1965	Succeeded by Arif Abd ar-Razzaq
Preceded by Abdul Rahman Arif	Prime Minister of Iraq; 1967-1968	Succeeded by Abd ar-Razzaq an-Naif
