= Abdul-Rahman al-Bazzaz =

Iraqi politician, academic and pan-Arab nationalist (1913–1973)

Abdul Rahman al-Bazzaz
- عبد الرحمن البزاز
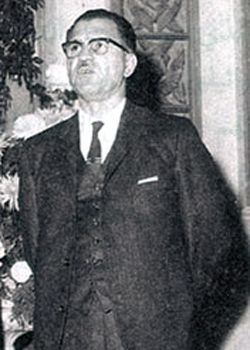
- Al-Bazzaz in 1960

Acting President of Iraq
- In office 13 April 1966 – 16 April 1966
- Prime Minister: Himself
- Preceded by: Abdul Salam Arif
- Succeeded by: Abdul Rahman Arif

Prime Minister of Iraq
- In office 21 September 1965 – 9 August 1966
- President: Abdul Salam Arif; Himself (acting); Abdul Rahman Arif
- Preceded by: Arif Abd ar-Razzaq
- Succeeded by: Naji Talib

Foreign Minister of Iraq
- In office 6 November 1965 – 11 December 1965
- President: Abdul Salam Arif
- Preceded by: Naji Talib
- Succeeded by: Adnan Pachachi

2nd Secretary General of OPEC
- In office 1 May 1964 – 30 April 1965
- Preceded by: Fuad Rouhani
- Succeeded by: Ashraf T. Lutfi

Personal details
- Born: 20 February 1913 Baghdad, Ottoman Iraq
- Died: 28 June 1973 (aged 60) Baghdad, Ba'athist Iraq
- Party: Iraqi Arab Socialist Union
- Education: University of Baghdad; King's College London
- Occupation: Dean of Baghdad Law College

Abdul Rahman al-Bazzaz (Arabic: عبد الرحمن البزاز; 20 February 1913 – 28 June 1973) was an Iraqi politician, reformist and writer who served as prime minister of Iraq from 1965 to 1966 and as the interim president in 1966.

A pan-Arab nationalist politician, Al-Bazzaz served as the Dean of Baghdad Law College prior to his appointment as prime minister. His main political project was the professionalization of the government through increasing access to civilian expertise. That civic agenda came at the expense of the military. Following the 1968 coup in Iraq, Al-Bazzaz was charged by the Ba'athist government for participating in dissident activities against the government, and he was tortured and imprisoned for fifteen months. Al-Bazzaz was released because of illness in 1970 and moved to London for treatment. He died in Baghdad on 28 June 1973.

== Early life and education ==
Abd al-Rahman al-Bazzaz was born to a Sunni Muslim family in Baghdad. His brother was the plant ecologist, Fakhri A. Bazzaz.

He completed both elementary school and high school in Baghdad. Al-Bazzaz graduated from the Baghdad Law College in 1934. In 1938 Al-Bazzaz completed his law studies at King's College London. During the 1930s, he became an affiliate of the Muthanna and Jawwal clubs, the academic focus of which was pan-Arabism and encouraging Arab nationalism. The Muthanna Club was established in Baghdad in 1935 and was an influential radical pan-Arab and pan-Islamist fascist society which collapsed with the Rashid Ali al-Gaylani rebellion. In 1941, al-Bazzaz supported the 1941 Iraqi coup d'état. After the coup failed, al-Bazzaz was incarcerated during the Second World War but he was released at the end of the war.

== Academic career ==
After the war, al-Bazzaz was chosen as the dean of the Baghdad Law College. In 1956 he was forced out of this role by the government for protesting against the invasion of Egypt by France, Britain and Israel. He signed a petition that was very critical of the Iraqi government's stand during the Suez crisis under the premiership of Nuri as-Said, a staunch opponent of Egyptian president Gamal Abdel Nasser. Al-Bazzaz returned to the Baghdad Law College as the dean after the revolution in 1958. Al-Bazzaz's interest in the pan-Arab movement again put him into disagreement with the government, this time with the new government of Abd al-Karim Qasim (1958–1963), an Iraqi nationalist aligned with communist forces. In 1959 Colonel ‘Abd al-Wahhab al-Shawwaf, who was the Commander of the Mosul Garrison, instigated a rebellion. After four days of fighting, he was killed and the uprising was crushed. Following the collapse of the Shawwaf uprising, al-Bazzaz was arrested and tortured. After his release, al-Bazzaz went to Egypt, where he became the dean of the Institute of Arab Studies at the Arab League.

Al-Bazzaz was a prolific writer. He published more than twelve books about law, Iraq's history, Arab nationalism and Islam. In his writings, he saw no obvious contradiction between Arab nationalism and Islam. Arab nationalism was not based on race or solidarity of blood. It was based on ties of language, history, spirituality and basic interests in life. In addition to being a religious belief, Islam was viewed as a social system, a philosophy of life, a system of economics and of government.

Al-Bazzaz strongly promoted the rule of law and wanted to see an end to military officers dominating Iraq's politics as they had since the revolution in July 1958.

== Political career ==
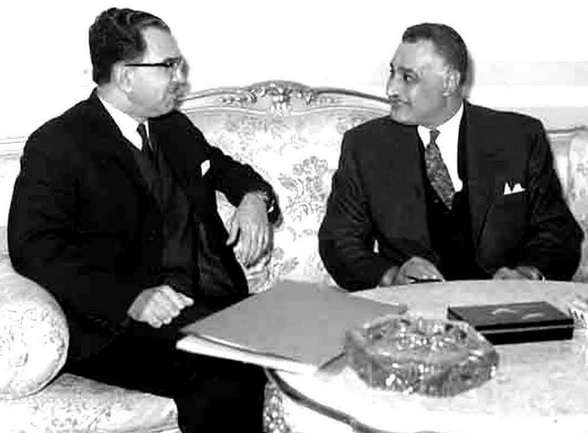
Al-Bazzaz (left) with Egyptian president Gamal Abdel Nasser in Cairo, February 1966

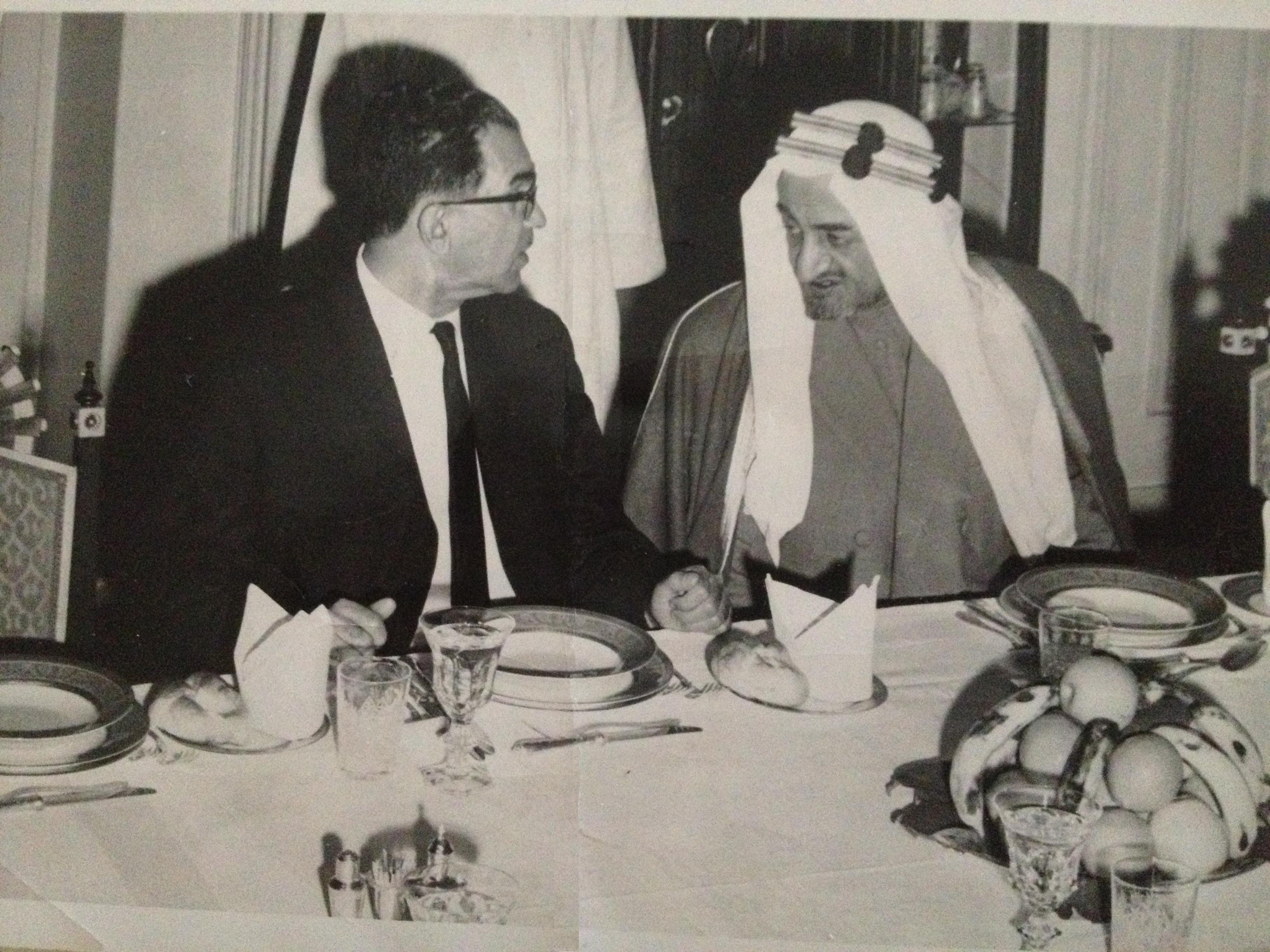
Al-Bazzaz (left) with Faisal of Saudi Arabia, Ramadan 1966

Al-Bazzaz returned to Iraq after the military overthrew the Qasim administration in 1963. From 1963 to 1966, President Abd al-Salam Arif appointed al-Bazzaz to several government positions. He was selected as ambassador to the United Arab Republic and later he became the ambassador to England. In 1964 and 1965, he was the secretary-general of the Organization of Petroleum Exporting Countries. In September 1965, he was appointed as deputy prime minister. The then prime minister, Arif Abd ar-Razzaq, tried to start a revolt and seize power. However he was unsuccessful and President Arif invited al-Bazzaz to form a new government. Al-Bazzaz was the first civilian prime minister of Iraq.

During his time as prime minister, Al-Bazzaz's government became increasingly controlled by civilian politicians. He replaced the Revolutionary Military Council with the National Defence Council and limited its functions to defence and internal security. The political system was open compared with previous regimes. As prime minister, Al-Bazzaz held numerous news conferences and appeared on radio and television. Constructive criticism was encouraged, and he promised to restore parliamentary life and hold elections as soon as possible.

Al-Bazzaz announced the First Five Year Plan which advocated prudent socialism and attempted to balance the public and private sectors. He advocated joint ventures between the public and private sectors as well as between foreign and domestic investors. He favoured a theory of prudent socialism which sought to increase production without abandoning equal distribution.

Another policy that al-Bazzaz tried to institute was the formal recognition of the Kurds. This was to be achieved through a twelve-point agreement whose purpose was to provide constitutional recognition to the Kurds and to recognize Kurdish as an official language of Iraq. The plan was to hold a parliamentary election within the period mandated in the provisional constitution of 1964. It provided for representation of the Kurds in all branches of the government. It gave the Kurds the right to organise their own political parties and publish their own newspapers. However, al-Bazzaz was forced to resign in August 1966 so the agreement was never signed.

President Arif died suddenly in April 1966 in a plane crash, and al-Bazzaz became acting president for three days. A power struggle for the presidency occurred. In the first meeting of the Defence Council and Cabinet to elect a president, Al-Bazzaz needed a two-thirds majority to win the presidency. Al-Bazzaz was unsuccessful in achieving this goal and Abd al-Rahman Arif was elected as president. He asked al-Bazzaz to form a new cabinet in April 1966. However, al-Bazzaz was then pressured to resign by various political groups, including the Ba'athists. The leaders of these groups were military officers who were against al-Bazzaz's goal to reduce military salaries, privileges and power.

The Ba'athists and Nasserists accused al-Bazzaz of being an adversary of Arab socialism and being against the proposed union of Egypt and Iraq. In January 1969, he was charged by the Ba'athist government with participation in activities against the government. He was tortured and imprisoned for fifteen months. In 1970, he was released from jail because he became ill and he went to London for treatment. He later died in Baghdad on 28 June 1973.

== Sources ==
- Historical Dictionary of Iraq by Edmund A. Ghareeb
- The Modern History of Iraq by Phebe Marr
- A History of Iraq 3rd edition by Charles Tripp
- On Arab Nationalism by Abd al-Rahman al-Bazzaz translated by Edward Atiyah
- Republican Iraq: A Study in Iraqi Politics since the Revolution of 1958 by Majid Khadduri
- Time (magazine)

Political offices
Preceded by Abd as-Salam Arif	Temporary President of Iraq acting; April 13, 1966 – April 16, 1966	Succeeded by Abd ar-Rahman Arif
Preceded by Arif Abd ar-Razzaq	Prime Minister of Iraq; 1965 – 1966	Succeeded by Naji Talib
