= Abdul Rahman Arif =

President of Iraq from 1966 to 1968

- عبد الرحمن عارف
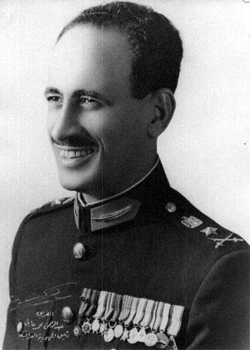
- Arif in 1966

3rd President of Iraq
- In office 16 April 1966 – 17 July 1968
- Prime Minister: Abd ar-Rahman al-Bazzaz; Naji Talib; Himself; Tahir Yahya
- Preceded by: Abdul Salam Arif
- Succeeded by: Ahmed Hassan al-Bakr

Prime Minister of Iraq
- In office 10 May 1967 – 10 July 1967
- President: Himself
- Preceded by: Naji Talib
- Succeeded by: Tahir Yahya

Personal details
- Born: 14 April 1916 Baghdad, Ottoman Iraq
- Died: 24 August 2007 (aged 91) Amman, Jordan
- Party: Arab Socialist Union
- Spouse: Faika Abdul-Mageed Faris Alanee
- Children: 5
- Relatives: Abdul Salam Arif (brother)

Military service
- Allegiance: Kingdom of Iraq (1939–1958); Iraqi Republic (1958–1968)
- Branch/service: Iraqi Ground Forces
- Years of service: 1939–1968
- Rank: Lieutenant general
- Battles/wars: Second World War; Middle Eastern theatre; Anglo-Iraqi War; 1948 Arab-Israeli War; 1958 Iraqi coup d'état; First Iraqi–Kurdish War; Six-Day War

Abdul Rahman Mohammed ʿArif al-Jumayli (Arabic: عبد الرحمن محمد عارف الجميلي, romanized: ʿAbd al-Raḥmān ʿĀrif; 14 April 1916 – 24 August 2007), better known as Abdul Rahman Arif, was an Iraqi military officer and politician who served as the third president of Iraq from 16 April 1966 to 17 July 1968. He was the older brother of the second president of Iraq, Abdul Salam Arif, whom he succeeded after his brother died in an airplane crash in 1966.

== Biography ==
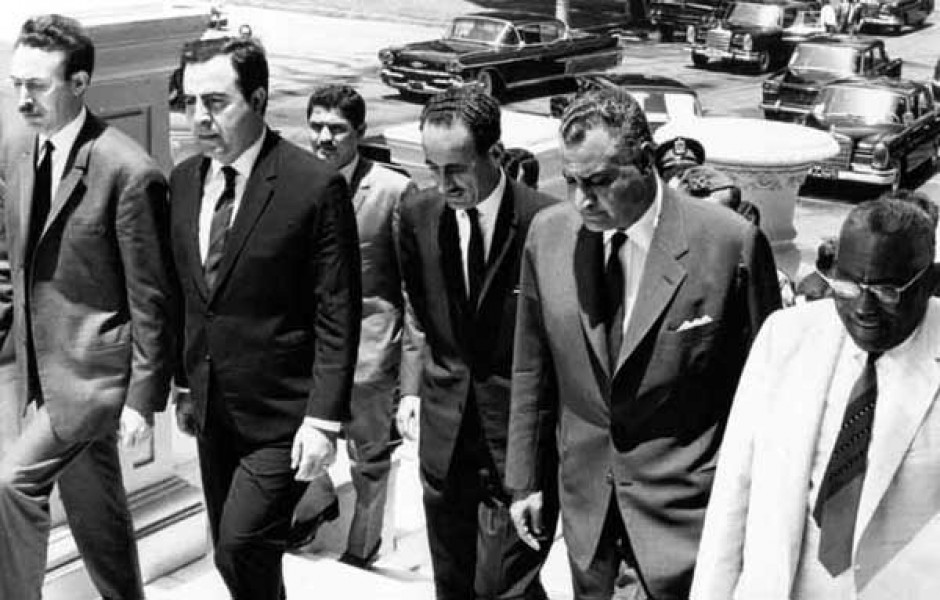
From left to right, Houari Boumediene of Algeria, Nureddin al-Atassi of Syria, Abdul Rahman Aref of Iraq, Gamel Abdel Nasser of Egypt, and Ismail al-Azhari of Sudan in 1968

Abdul Rahman Arif was a career soldier in the Iraqi Army. He supported the military coup in 1958 that overthrew the monarchy, and also supported the coup that brought his brother, Abdul Salam, to power in 1963. His brother appointed him head of the army following the coup, and when the younger Arif died in an aircraft crash in April 1966, Prime Minister Abdul Rahman al-Bazzaz ("a Western-oriented lawyer" and the first civilian to head an Iraqi government since the 1958 revolution) became acting president. Three days later, al-Bazzaz was chosen to become president, but al-Bazzaz immediately relinquished the presidency to Abdul Rahman Arif. It is speculated that the transfer of power possibly occurred because the Iraqi military thought that Abdul Salam should be succeeded by his weak and easier to manipulate brother instead. Arif was appointed president by the Iraqi Revolutionary Command Council. He continued his brother's policies, but with a more nationalistic profile.

Like his brother Abdul Salam, he was an overt supporter of Egypt's pan-Arabist president Gamal Abdel Nasser. Arif Abdul Razzak, another pro-Nasser Air Force Commander, attempted a coup d'état on Arif, and lightly bombed the Presidential Palace with Soviet MiG-17 jets, but the coup failed and he was arrested. It was his second failed coup attempt on the Arif government. President Arif went on television to declare that on this occasion, Abdul Razzak would definitely be punished, only to then release him with a pardon.

His presidency was widely believed to be slack and indecisive. However, there are historical clues that he was not corrupt. The ill-advised law that he passed to absolve himself from paying income tax was probably an indication that he was not capable of getting wealth otherwise. Shortly after Arif came to power, the Iraqi military launched a major offensive against Kurdish rebels led by Mustafa Barzani in the First Iraqi–Kurdish War, pitting 40,000 Iraqi troops against Barzani's 3,500-strong Peshmerga. Iranian and Israeli support contributed to a decisive Kurdish victory at the Battle of Mount Handren on 11 May 1966, where a battle plan devised by IDF military officer Zuri Sagy resulted in the killing of 1,400-2,000 Iraqi troops and the capture of hundreds more. Regime hard-liners were discredited by the debacle, and on 29 June 1966, Bazzaz announced a Twelve Point Plan for peace, which included "administrative decentralisation" in Iraqi Kurdistan and "Kurdish representation in Parliament".

Throughout July 1966, Bazzaz began implementing the agreement by "approving a massive rehabilitation program, lifting the economic blockade, releasing hundreds of Kurdish prisoners, removing Arab tribes from former Kurdish lands, and passing a general amnesty law", but opposition within the military forced Arif to dismiss Bazzaz in favour of General Naji Talib on 6 August 1966. Regardless, American officials in the Lyndon B. Johnson administration welcomed Iraq's brief return to civilian rule under Bazzaz as well as Arif's thwarting of Razzak's second coup attempt on 30 June. Arif was considered "one of the few forces of moderation" in Iraq, having previously established a friendship with U.S. ambassador Robert Strong and making a number of friendly gestures to the United States between April 1966 and January 1967.

At Arif's request, President Johnson met five Iraqi generals and Iraqi ambassador Nasir Hani in Washington, D.C., on 25 January 1967, reiterating his "desire to build an ever closer relationship between [the] two governments." According to Johnson's National Security Adviser, Walt Rostow, the U.S. National Security Council even contemplated welcoming Arif on a state visit to Washington, although this proposal was ultimately rejected due to concerns about the stability of Arif's government.

Prior to the outbreak of the Six-Day War, Iraqi foreign minister Adnan Pachachi met with a number of U.S. officials to discuss the escalating Middle East crisis on 1 June, including the U.S. ambassador to the UN Arthur Goldberg, Under Secretary of State for Political Affairs Eugene V. Rostow, Secretary of State Dean Rusk, and President Johnson himself. The political atmosphere engendered by the costly Arab defeat prompted Iraq to break relations with the U.S. on 7 June, and ultimately ensured the collapse of Arif's relatively moderate government.

On 17 July 1968, while Arif was sleeping, his own assistants along with members of the Ba'ath Party, Ahmed Hassan al-Bakr, overthrew him in a bloodless coup. As Arif and his brother had done in the 1963 coup against Qasim, the coalition declared victory once they had captured the radio station and the Ministry of Defence. It was accomplished when the defence minister, Hardan al-Tikriti, phoned Arif informing him that he was no longer president. Arif was exiled to Turkey.

Arif returned to Iraq in 1979 when Saddam Hussein came to power, and largely stayed out of the public and political spotlight afterwards. He was allowed to leave the country once to undertake the Hajj. Arif left Iraq permanently after Hussein was removed from power by the U.S.-led invasion, and lived in Amman, Jordan from 2004. He died in Amman on 24 August 2007, He was married to Faika Abdul-Mageed Faris Alanee.

== Quotes ==
- "The existence of Israel is an error which we must put right. This is our opportunity to wipe out the disgrace which is Israel which has been with us since 1948. Our goal is clear – to wipe Israel off the map", speaking on the Radio, 1 June 1967
- "I hope there will be stability and security in all parts of Iraq and neighbouring Arab countries", he said. "I hope there will be national unity in Iraq by forgetting the past and looking for the future."

Political offices
Preceded by Abd ar-Rahman al-Bazzaz	President of Iraq; 16 April 1966 – 17 July 1968	Succeeded by Ahmed Hassan al-Bakr
Preceded by Naji Talib	Prime Minister of Iraq; 1967	Succeeded by Tahir Yahya
