= Abdul Salam Arif =

President of Iraq from 8 February 1963 to 13 April 1966

- عبد السلام عارف
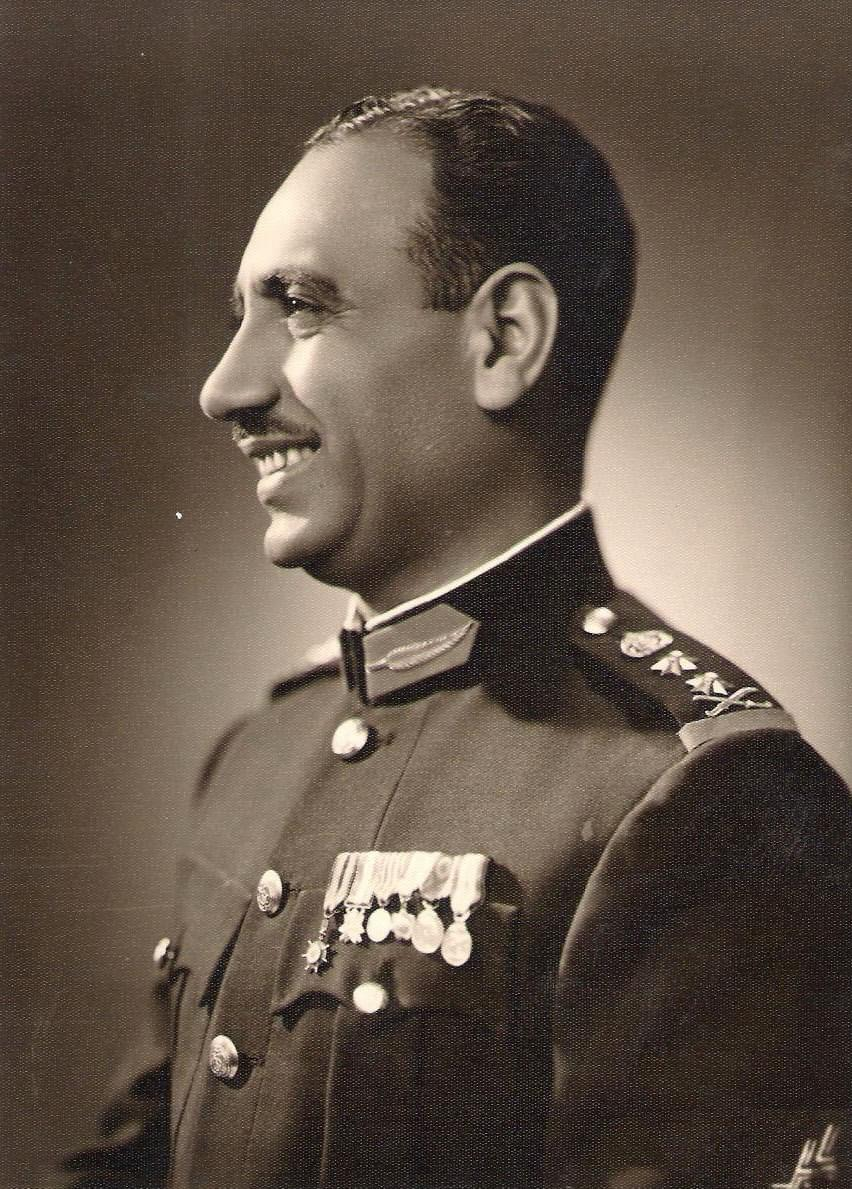
- Arif in the 1960s

2nd President of Iraq
- In office 8 February 1963 – 13 April 1966
- Prime Minister: Ahmed Hassan al-Bakr; Tahir Yahya; Arif Abd ar-Razzaq; Abd ar-Rahman al-Bazzaz
- Preceded by: Muhammad Najib ar-Ruba'i
- Succeeded by: Abdul Rahman Arif

Deputy Prime Minister of Iraq
- In office 14 July 1958 – 30 September 1958

Minister of Interior of Iraq
- In office 14 July 1958 – 30 September 1958
- Preceded by: Muhammad Saeed Effendi bin Mirza Majeed bin Al-Hajj Ahmad Al-Qazzaz
- Succeeded by: Ahmed Mohammed Yahya

Ambassador of the Republic of Iraq to the Federal Republic of Germany
- In office 30 September 1958 – 9 November 1958

Supreme Commander of the Iraqi Armed Forces
- In office 8 February 1966 – 13 April 1966

Chairman of the National Council for the Leadership of the Revolution
- In office 8 February 1958 – 13 April 1966

Personal details
- Born: 21 March 1921 Baghdad, Mandatory Iraq
- Died: 13 April 1966 (aged 45) Basra Governorate, Iraqi Republic
- Cause of death: Airplane crash
- Party: Arab Socialist Union
- Spouse: Nahida Hussein Farid Al-Rayyis
- Children: 7
- Relatives: Abdul Rahman Arif (brother)

Military service
- Allegiance: Kingdom of Iraq (1939–1958); Iraqi Republic (1958–1966)
- Branch/service: Iraqi Ground Forces
- Years of service: 1939–1966
- Rank: Colonel
- Battles/wars: Second World War; Middle Eastern theatre; Anglo-Iraqi War; First Arab-Israeli War; Battle of Jenin; First Iraqi–Kurdish War; Ramadan Revolution

Abdul Salam Mohammed ʿArif Al-Jumaili (Arabic: عبد السلام محمد عارف الجميليʿAbd al-Salām Muḥammad ʿĀrif al-Jumaylī; 21 March 1921 – 13 April 1966) was an Iraqi military officer and politician who served as the second president of Iraq from 1963 until his death in a plane crash in 1966. He played a leading role in the 14 July Revolution, in which the Hashemite Kingdom of Iraq was overthrown on 14 July 1958.

== 1958 coup and conflict with Qasim ==
Along with Abdel Karim Qasim and other Iraqi military officers, Arif was a member of the clandestine organisation, the Free Officers of Iraq. Like Qasim, Arif served with distinction in the otherwise unsuccessful 1948 Arab–Israeli War, where he captured Jenin in what is now the West Bank part of Palestine from Israeli Defence Forces. During the summer of 1958, Prime Minister Nuri al-Said ordered Iraqi troops under Arif to aid Jordan, as part of an agreement of the Arab Federation. Instead, however, he led his army units into Baghdad and on 14 July launched a coup against the Hashemite monarchy. Qasim formed a government under the newly proclaimed republic and Arif, his chief aide, was appointed deputy prime minister, interior minister, and deputy commander-in-chief of the armed forces.

Almost immediately however, tensions rose between the pan-Arabist Arif and Iraqi nationalist Qasim who also had the support of the Iraqi Communist Party. The former supported a union with the United Arab Republic (UAR) — composed of Egypt and Syria — under president Gamal Abdel Nasser, but the latter opposed merging with the UAR. As a result, the two leaders engaged in a power struggle, ending in Qasim prevailing and the removal of Arif from his positions on 12 September. He was appointed the low-ranking post of ambassador to Bonn. Arif refused to take up the post and upon returning to Baghdad on 4 November, he was promptly arrested for plotting against the state. He was sentenced to death along with Rashid Ali al-Gaylani in February 1959. Qasim had him released in November 1961.

== President of Iraq ==
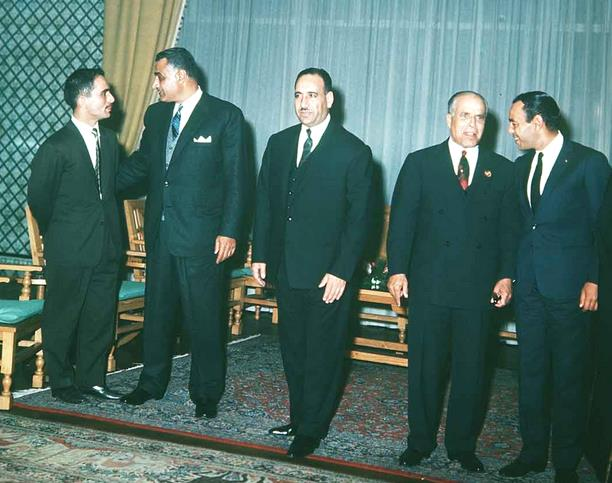
Arab leaders at the 1964 Arab League summit in Alexandria. From left to right: Hussein of Jordan, Gamal Abdel Nasser, Arif, Habib Bourguiba and Hassan II of Morocco

Qasim was overthrown on 8 February 1963, by a coalition of Ba'athists, army units, and other pan-Arabist groups. Arif had previously been selected as the leader of the Iraqi Revolutionary Command Council and after the coup he was elected president of Iraq due to his popularity. Qasim pleaded with Arif to be exiled instead of executed and reminded Arif that he had commuted his death sentence two years before. Nonetheless, Arif demanded that Qasim swear to the Qur'an that it was he, Arif, who had been the real leader of the 1958 coup. Qasim refused and was consequently executed.

Arif was a Pan-Arabist who advocated for Arab-Islamic nationalism, which caused conflicts between him and Qasim. He had criticized Qasim for excluding Iraq from Pan-Arab efforts and pursuing an Iraqi policy instead. However, Arif also held fairly liberal views on Kurds, and supported Iraq's alignment with the Soviet Union.

Although he was chosen as president, more power was held by the Ba'athist secretary general Ali Salih al-Sa'di and Ba'athist prime minister, Ahmed Hassan al-Bakr. Following a Ba'athist-led coup in Syria in March 1963, Arif entered his country into unification talks with Syria and Egypt (which had split from the UAR in 1961). After a falling out with Nasser in July, the Ba'athist government of Iraq removed all non-Ba'athist members from the cabinet, despite Arif's support for Nasser. Arif also was critical of Sa'di's hardline anti-Sovietism and pro-American stance. 18 November Arif, with the support of disaffected elements in the military, took advantage of a split between the Ba'ath—which weakened the party—and ousted their members from the government. Arif formed a new cabinet, retaining a few Ba'athists, but mostly made up of Nasserist army officers and technocrats. He maintained his presidency and appointed himself chief-of-staff. A month later he handed the latter post to his brother General Abdul Rahman Arif, and the premiership to his confidant Lieutenant-General Tahir Yahya. In the fall of 1964, the Ba'ath attempted to depose Arif but failed when their plot was unveiled. Arif had the conspirators, including Saddam Hussein, arrested.

On 26 May 1964, Arif established the Joint Presidency Council with Egypt. On 14 July the anniversary of the revolution, he declared the establishment of the Arab Socialist Union (ASU) of Iraq, commending it as the "threshold of the building of the unity of the Arab nation under Arab socialism." It was nearly identical in structure the ASU of Egypt and like in Egypt, many of the Arab nationalist parties were dissolved and absorbed by the ASU. Also, all banks and over thirty major Iraqi businesses were nationalised. Arif undertook these measures in an effort to bring Iraq closer with Egypt and the Soviet bloc to help foster unity and on 20 December plans for union were announced. Despite this, in July 1965, the Nasserist ministers resigned from the Iraqi cabinet.

President Arif played a major role in encouraging construction in Iraq and developing the country's infrastructure.

== Death ==
On 13 April 1966, Arif was killed in the crash of Iraqi Air Force de Havilland DH.104 Dove 1, RF392, in southern Iraq about 10 kilometres from Basra Airport, and was replaced as president by his brother Abdul Rahman. Reports at the time said Arif had died in a helicopter accident. Abd al-Rahman al-Bazzaz became acting president for three days, and a power struggle for the presidency occurred. In the first meeting of the Defense Council and cabinet to elect a president, Al-Bazzaz needed a two-thirds majority to win the presidency. Al-Bazzaz was unsuccessful, and Abdul Rahman Arif was elected president. He was viewed by army officers as weaker and more easy to manipulate than his brother.

== Family ==
On 13 December 2004, Arif's daughter, Sana Abdul Salam, and her husband, Wamith Abdul Razzak Said Alkadiry, were shot dead in their home in Baghdad by unknown assailants. Rafal Alkadiry, their 22-year-old son, was kidnapped, and later killed.

== Bibliography ==
- Fouad Ajami (2006), The Foreigner's Gift: The Americans, the Arabs, and the Iraqis in Iraq, University Press of Florida, ISBN 0-7432-3667-X
- Tareq Y. Ismael; Jacqueline S. Ismael; Kamal Abu Jaber (1991), Politics and Government in the Middle East and North Africa, Simon and Schuster, ISBN 0-8130-1043-8
- Bernard Reich (1990), Political Leaders of the Contemporary Middle East and North Africa: A Biographical Dictionary, Greenwood Publishing Group, ISBN 0-313-26213-6

Political offices
| Preceded by Muhammad Najib ar-Ruba'i | President of Iraq; February 8, 1963 – April 13, 1966 | Succeeded by Abd ar-Rahman al-Bazzaz |
