= List of members of the Revolutionary Command Council under Ahmed Hassan al-Bakr =

The following is a list of members of the Revolutionary Command Council under Ahmed Hassan al-Bakr. The tables are ordered after the Iraqi-Ba'athist order of precedence.

== Members ==
=== 1968–1969 ===
| Member | Position | Took office | Left office |
|---|---|---|---|
| Ahmed Hassan al-Bakr | Chairman of the Revolutionary Command Council | 17 July 1968 | November 1969 |
| Salih Mahdi Ammash | Deputy Chairman of the Revolutionary Command Council | July 1968 | November 1969 |
| Hardan al-Tikriti | | July 1968 | November 1969 |
| Saadoun Ghaydan | | July 1968 | November 1969 |
| Hammad Shihab | | July 1968 | November 1969 |

=== 1969–1977 ===
| Member | Position | Took office | Left office |
|---|---|---|---|
| Ahmed Hassan al-Bakr | Chairman of the Revolutionary Command Council | November 1969 | March 1977 |
| Saddam Hussein | Deputy Chairman of the Revolutionary Command Council | November 1969 | March 1977 |
| Salih Mahdi Ammash | | November 1969 | 1971 |
| Hardan al-Tikriti | | November 1969 | 1970 |
| Saadoun Ghaydan | | November 1969 | March 1977 |
| Hammad Shihab | | November 1969 | 1973 |
| Abd al-Karim Abd al-Sattar al-Shaykhli | | November 1969 | 1971 |
| Abdullah Sallum al-Samarra'i | | November 1969 | 1970 |
| Murdatha al-Hadithi | | November 1969 | June 1974 |
| Abd al-Khaliq al-Samarra'i | | November 1969 | 1973 |
| Izzat Ibrahim ad-Douri | | November 1969 | March 1977 |
| Salah Omar al-Ali | | November 1969 | 1970 |
| Taha Yassin Ramadan | | November 1969 | March 1977 |
| Shafiq 'Abd al-Jabbar al-Kamali | | November 1969 | 1970 |
| Izzat Mustafa | | November 1969 | March 1977 |

=== 1977 ===
| Member | Position | Took office | Left office |
|---|---|---|---|
| Ahmed Hassan al-Bakr | Chairman of the Revolutionary Command Council | March 1977 | September 1977 |
| Saddam Hussein | Deputy Chairman of the Revolutionary Command Council | March 1977 | September 1977 |
| Saadoun Ghaydan | | March 1977 | September 1977 |
| Izzat Ibrahim ad-Douri | | March 1977 | September 1977 |
| Taha Yassin Ramadan | | March 1977 | September 1977 |

=== 1977–1979 ===
| Member | Position | Took office | Left office |
|---|---|---|---|
| Ahmed Hassan al-Bakr | Chairman of the Revolutionary Command Council | September 1977 | July 1979 |
| Saddam Hussein | Deputy Chairman of the Revolutionary Command Council | September 1977 | July 1979 |
| Saadoun Ghaydan | | September 1977 | July 1979 |
| Izzat Ibrahim ad-Douri | | September 1977 | July 1979 |
| Taha Yassin Ramadan | | September 1977 | July 1979 |
| Na'im Haddad | | September 1977 | July 1979 |
| Tayih Abd al-Karim | | September 1977 | July 1979 |
| Mohammed Mahjoub al-Douri | | September 1977 | Executed 1979 |
| Muhammad Ayish Hamad | | September 1977 | Executed 1979 |
| Adnan al-Hamdani | | September 1977 | Executed 1979 |
| Ghanim 'Abd al-Jalil | | September 1977 | Executed 1979 |
| Muhyi Abdul-Hussein Mashhadi | | September 1977 | Executed 1979 |
| Tahir al-Ani | | September 1977 | July 1979 |
| Abd al-Fattah al-Yasin | | September 1977 | July 1979 |
| Hasan Ali | | September 1977 | July 1979 |
| Sa'dun Shakir | | September 1977 | July 1979 |
| Ja'far Qasim Hammudi | | September 1977 | July 1979 |
| Abdullah Fadhil Abbas | | September 1977 | July 1979 |
| Tariq Aziz | | September 1977 | July 1979 |
| Adnan Khairallah | | September 1977 | July 1979 |
| Hikmat Mizban Ibrahim | | September 1977 | July 1979 |
| Burhan Mustafa | | September 1977 | July 1979 |
