= List of ministers of defence of Iraq =

This is a list of Iraqi defence ministers from 1921 till present.

== List of ministers of defence ==
=== Kingdom of Iraq (1921–1958) ===
Name	Portrait	Term of office		Political party	Prime Minister
Jafar al-Askari		23 October 1920	16 November 1922		Abd Al-Rahman Al-Gillani
Nuri as-Said		20 November 1922	2 August 1924		
Yasin al-Hashimi		2 August 1924	2 June 1925		
Nuri as-Said		26 June 1925	8 January 1928		
Abd al-Muhsin as-Sa'dun		14 January 1928	20 January 1929		
Muhammad Amin Zaki		28 April 1929	25 August 1929		
Nuri al-Sa’id		19 September 1929	19 March 1930		
Jafar al-Askari		23 March 1930	27 October 1932		
Rashid al-Khawja		3 November 1932	18 March 1933		
Jalal Baban		20 March 1933	28 October 1933		

=== Iraqi Republic (1958–1968) ===
Name	Portrait	Term of office		Political party	President
Abd al-Karim Qasim		14 July 1958	8 February 1963	Independent	Muhammad Najib ar-Ruba'i
Salah Mahdi Ammash		8 February 1963	10 November 1963	Ba'ath Party (Iraq Region)	Abdul Salam Arif
Hardan al-Tikriti		10 November 1963	2 March 1964		Abdul Salam Arif
Tahir Yahya		2 March 1964	3 September 1965	Arab Socialist Union	Abdul Salam Arif
Arif Abd ar-Razzaq		6 September 1965	16 September 1965	Arab Socialist Union	Abdul Salam Arif
Abd al-'Aziz al-'Uqaili		21 September 1965	18 April 1966		Abdul Salam Arif
Shakir Mahmud Shukri		18 April 1966	17 July 1968		Abdul Rahman Arif

=== Ba'athist Iraq (1968–2003) ===
Name	Portrait	Term of office		Political party	President
Ibrahim Abdel Rahman Dawoud		17 July 1968	30 July 1968	Independent	Ahmed Hassan al-Bakr
Hardan al-Tikriti		30 July 1968	April 1970	Iraqi Ba'ath Party (Iraq Region)	Ahmed Hassan al-Bakr
Hammad Shihab		April 1970	30 June 1973	Iraqi Ba'ath Party (Iraq Region)	Ahmed Hassan al-Bakr
Abdullah al-Khadduri (acting)		30 June 1973	11 November 1974	Iraqi Ba'ath Party (Iraq Region)	Ahmed Hassan al-Bakr
Ahmed Hassan al-Bakr		11 November 1974	15 October 1977	Iraqi Ba'ath Party (Iraq Region)	Ahmed Hassan al-Bakr
Adnan Khairallah		15 October 1977	4 May 1989	Iraqi Ba'ath Party (Iraq Region)	Saddam Hussein
Abdul Jabbar Shanshal		4 May 1989	1990	Iraqi Ba'ath Party (Iraq Region)	Saddam Hussein
Saadi Toma		12 December 1990	6 April 1991	Iraqi Ba'ath Party (Iraq Region)	Saddam Hussein
Ali Hassan al-Majid		1991	1995	Iraqi Ba'ath Party (Iraq Region)	Saddam Hussein
Sultan Hashim		1995	2003	Iraqi Ba'ath Party (Iraq Region)	Saddam Hussein

=== Republic of Iraq (2004–present) ===
Name	Portrait	Term of office		Political party	Prime Minister
Ali Allawi		April 2004	June 2004	Independent	Ayad Allawi
Hazim al-Shaalan		June 2004	1 June 2005	Iraqi National Congress	Ayad Allawi
Saadoun al-Dulaimi		1 June 2005	6 March 2006	Independent	Ibrahim al-Jaafari
Abdul Qadir Obeidi		6 March 2006	21 December 2010	Independent	Nouri al-Maliki
Nouri al-Maliki		21 December 2010	17 August 2011	State of Law Coalition	Nouri al-Maliki
Saadoun al-Dulaimi		17 August 2011	18 October 2014	Unity Alliance of Iraq	Nouri al-Maliki
Khaled al-Obaidi		18 October 2014	19 August 2016	Unity Alliance of Iraq	Haider al-Abadi
Othman al-Ghanmi (interim)		19 August 2016	30 January 2017	State of Law Coalition	Haider al-Abadi
Erfan al-Hiyali		30 January 2017	24 June 2019	State of Law Coalition	Haider al-Abadi
Najah al-Shammari		24 June 2019	6 May 2020		Adil Abdul-Mahdi
Juma Inad		6 May 2020	Incumbent		Mustafa Al-Kadhimi; Mohammed Shia' Al Sudani
