= Abu Ghraib (disambiguation) =

Abu Ghraib is a city in the Baghdad Governorate of Iraq.

Abu Ghraib or Abu Gharib may also refer to:

- Abu Ghraib District, Iraq
- Abu Ghraib prison, Abu Ghraib, Iraq
  - Abu Ghraib torture and prisoner abuse
- Abu Ghraib (Botero series), a series of artworks by Fernando Botero

== See also ==
- Al Gharbiyah (disambiguation)
- Abu Gorab, Egypt
