= Directorate of General Security =

Former Iraqi government intelligence agency

- al-Amn al-‘Amm
- Former DGS logo

Agency overview
- Formed: 1921, under the Ministry of the Interior
- Dissolved: 2003
- Superseding agency: Iraqi national security service
- Jurisdiction: Government of Iraq
- Headquarters: Baghdad, Iraq
- Agency executive: Rafi abd al-Latif Tilfah al-Tikriti (1997–2003), Last Director
- Parent agency: Independent

The Directorate of General Security (DGS) (Arabic: مديرية الأمن العام, romanized: Mudiria al-Amn al-‘Amm, lit. 'Public Security Directorate') also known as Internal State Security was the national civilian security agency of the Ba'athist Iraq tasked with advancing domestic security including clandestine and covert operations, counterinsurgency, counterintelligence, counter-revolutionary, creation of domestic security network intelligence, executive protection (especially the Arab Socialist Ba'ath Party – Iraq Region high-ranking members, Prime Minister of Iraq, Revolutionary Command Council members, and Saddam Hussein and his family), intelligence assessment, protects classified domestic security information, psychological warfare, political warfare, support irregular warfare operations, surveillance and suppression of those who disagree with the government, and threat assessment to domestic security.

== History ==
The DGS was founded in 1921 during the Iraqi monarchy, and it operated under the Ministry of the Interior until 1968. Its police and military officers were charged with the "general security of the state and its property", which included the use of torture and monitoring of dissent. It was trained by Egypt’s State Security Investigations Service (Mabahith Amn El Dawla) in the 1960’s.

=== Kzar coup ===
Nadhim Kzar was named director by Saddam Hussein in 1969 after the DGS had deteriorated under 10 years (1958–1968) of army rule. Kzar was known for his sadism, and during his term the DGS tortured and killed thousands. Much of this violence was directed against the Iraqi Communist Party and Iraqi Kurdistan; Kzar twice attempted to assassinate Kurdish leader Mustafa Barzani.

Kzar was a Shia Muslim and angered by the Sunni hold on power in Iraq. He led an ultimately unsuccessful coup in 1973 against President Ahmed Hassan al-Bakr, including taking hostage both Minister of the Interior Saadoun Ghaidan and Army Chief of Staff and Minister of Defense General Hamid Shehab.

Bakr was to be assassinated when his plane landed in Baghdad, but a flight delay caused Kzar to abort the assassination and flee with his hostages. As Kzar's convoy attempted to escape to Iran, it was attacked by Iraqi helicopter gunships, leading to Kzar's capture, General Shehab's death, and Gheidan's bodily injury. Kzar was judged for his actions and found guilty on July 7 by the Iraqi Revolutionary Command Council under Izzat Ibrahim ad-Douri, then executed that same month.

=== Reorganization ===
As a result of the attempted 1973 coup, Saddam Hussein sought a secret agreement with KGB head Yuri Andropov late that same year, leading to a close relationship that included intelligence exchange, Iraqi training in KGB and Main Intelligence Directorate (GRU) schools, thorough DGS reorganization under KGB guidance, provision of counterintelligence, interrogation, and surveillance equipments, and Iraqi embassy support of Soviet agents in countries without Soviet relations.

A 1974 Political Report of the Arab Socialist Baath Party' acknowledged the failings of the government in controlling the DGS:

"The State security service, though reinforced throughout by Party members and independent patriots, was an immense machine which, under previous regimes, had used blackmail against the party and other national movements, and thus had evolved a peculiar psychology. To reform it, to make it adopt new values and practices was therefore very difficult. It has indeed made serious mistakes during the period under review [1968–1973], to the detriment of the Party's reputation and policy in various fields. The leadership was at fault in allowing this sensitive organisation to operate without rigorous and careful control. Some officers of this service abused the confidence placed in them by the Party, to the extent of conspiring against the Party, as in the plot of 30 June 1973. This criminal enterprise alerted the Party to the dangers of inadequate control, and extensive changes were made."

=== Saddam Hussein era ===
The Directorate of General Security (DGS) was re-established as an independent entity reporting directly to President Saddam Hussein in the late 1970s or 1989. In 1980, Hussein decided to expand Ba'athist ideology within the ranks by appointing as DGS Director his first cousin Ali Hassan al-Majid. Majid led the DGS throughout the Iran–Iraq War

During the 1991 uprisings in Iraq, the DGS was targeted by insurgents, including a battle at its Sulaymaniyah headquarters. Tons of documents were seized by Kurdish guerrilla forces and civilians, and while much was shipped to the United States, some were kept by Kurdish parties and individuals. The uprising led Saddam Hussein to create the Emergency Forces (Qawat al-Tawaria), a new paramilitary branch of the agency. The DGS also began to solicit greater information on foreigners in Iraq, with reports coming in from taxi drivers like those around the Al-Rashid Hotel and from Ministry of Culture and Information guides and translators, who were a journalist's only option when visiting Iraq.

In 2002, Jane's Intelligence Review reported that the DGS employed 10,000 personnel, mainly Ba'ath Party members.

In April 2002, a defector who had been a lieutenant colonel in the DGS stated that 40% of the rank-and-file DGS personnel were not showing up for work, instead preparing forged papers to exchange for dollars and euros.

The last director of DGS before the American-led invasion, Rafi Abd al-Latif Tilfah al-Tikriti, was the jack of hearts in the U.S. military's most-wanted Iraqi playing cards. According to the U.S. Defense Intelligence Agency, he was a leader in the insurgency against Coalition forces. As of 2020, he remained wanted by the Iraqi government and is still at large.

The DGS was officially dissolved on May 23, 2003, per Order Number 2 of the Coalition Provisional Authority under L. Paul Bremer.

== Directors ==
- Alwan Hussein (1940–1946)
- Bahjat Daoud Salman Al-Attiyah (1946–1958)
- Abdul Majeed Jalil (1958–1963)
- Jamil Sabry Al-Bayati (1963)
- Anwar Thamer Al-Ani (1963–1964
- Rashid Mohsen (1964–1965)
- Abdul Jalil Ahmed Al-Ubaidi (1965–1966)
- Ismail Shahin (1966–1968)
- Nadhim Kzar (1968–1973)
- Abdul Khaliq Abdul Aziz Saeed (1973–1976)
- Fadhel Barak Hussein Al-Nasiri (1976-1984)
- Ali Hassan al-Majid (1984–1987)
- Abdul Rahman al-Duri (1987–1991)
- Sabawi Ibrahim al-Tikriti (1991–1996)
- Taha Abbas al-Ahbabi (1996–1997)
- Tahir Jalil al-Habbush (1997–1999)
- Rafi abd al-Latif Tilfah al-Tikriti (1997–2003)

== See also ==
- Law enforcement in Iraq
- Iraqi Intelligence Service – external Iraqi security agency
- Directorate of General Military Intelligence – Iraqi military intelligence agency
- Iraqi Special Security Organization – Former security agency responsible for security of VIPs
- U.S. list of most-wanted Iraqis
