= 1979 Ba'ath Party purge =

Public purge of the Iraqi Ba'ath Party by Saddam Hussein

1979 Ba'ath Party Purge Comrades Massacre
- Part of Assadist–Saddamist conflict
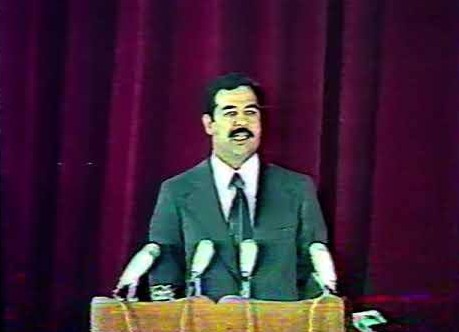
- Saddam Hussein speech during the purge
- Date: 22 July 1979
- Location: Baghdad, Iraq
- Also known as: Comrades Massacre
- Type: Purge
- Cause: Failure of unity talks between Syrian and Iraqi Ba'ath Parties; Saddam's claim that he has discovered a fifth column in the Revolutionary Command Council plotting to overthrow the party leadership in co-ordination with Hafez al-Assad
- Organised by: Saddam Hussein
- Outcome: Killing of former Secretary Muhyi Abdul-Hussein Mashhadi on 8 August 1979; Saddam Hussein's domination of the Ba'ath Party; Arrests and subsequent killings of Ba'athist opponents accused of Syrian collaboration; Deepening rift between Iraq-based and Syrian-based Ba'ath movements; Hafez al-Assad's support to Iran during the Iran–Iraq War
- Deaths: 21 executed
- Arrests: 68

A public purge of the Iraqi Ba'ath Party was orchestrated on 22 July 1979 by then-president Saddam Hussein, six days after his accession to the presidency of the Iraqi Republic.

Six days after the resignation of President Ahmed Hassan al-Bakr and Hussein's accession to Presidency of the Iraqi Republic, Regional Secretary of the party, and Chairman of the Revolutionary Command Council on 16 July 1979, he organized a Ba'ath conference on 22 July in Al-Khuld Hall in Baghdad to carry out a campaign of arrests and executions that included Ba'athist comrades, who were accused of taking part in a pro-Syrian plot to overthrow Saddam.

The list included most of the comrades who opposed Saddam Hussein's rise to power after Al-Bakr, and among these was the former president's secretary, Muhyi Abdul-Hussein Mashhadi. Names of people were announced and they were taken outside the hall and into custody; 21 of them were later executed. Ba'athist propaganda at the time showed that they were convicted of conspiracy and high treason to the party. Iraq subsequently cut off diplomatic relations with its fellow Ba'athist regime in Syria, accusing Hafez al-Assad of organizing the plot.

== Background ==
=== Syria–Iraq unification talks ===
Various rounds of unification talks were ongoing between the two Ba'athist parties at the official level, with the Iraqi vice-president, Saddam Hussein, publicly endorsing the merger of Iraq and Syria in 1978. By then, Saddam had become the effective leader of the Iraqi Ba'ath Party due to the Iraqi president, Ahmed Hussein Al-Bakr's health issues. A major demand of Saddam was the unification of both the Syrian and Iraqi wings of the Ba'ath Party, as the first step to integrate Syria with Iraq. He also sought the rehabilitation of Michel Aflaq who was on the kill-list of the Syrian Ba'ath party, and to make Aflaq the head of a re-unified Ba'ath Party. It was reported that the Syrian president, Hafez al-Assad, objected to these demands and was strongly opposed to the idea of a unified military command.

=== Resignation of al-Bakr ===
On 11 July 1979, an ailing al-Bakr announced his resignation before a meeting of the Revolutionary Command Council (RCC) and his intention to transfer the presidency to Saddam Hussein. It has been stated (such Radio Free Europe, established by act of the US congress, would state in 2003), that it was a coup orchestrated by Saddam who compelled the ailing president to retire "for health reasons".

Muhyi Abdul-Hussein Mashhadi, an RCC member, fiercely objected to al-Bakr's resignation during the session and urged al-Bakr to take a temporary vacation without transferring power to his successor, a proposition that was declined by al-Bakr. This had raised the suspicion of Saddam Hussein, the Iraqi second-in-command who became president on 16 July 1979. In an assembly of the party leadership convened on 22 July, Saddam staged a purge against the military wing of the Ba'ath Party whom he accused of collaborating with Syria to topple the regime in Iraq.

== Event ==
External videos
- BBC News "Saddam's 1979 Baath Party purge", Footage of the purge from a Ba'ath Party video

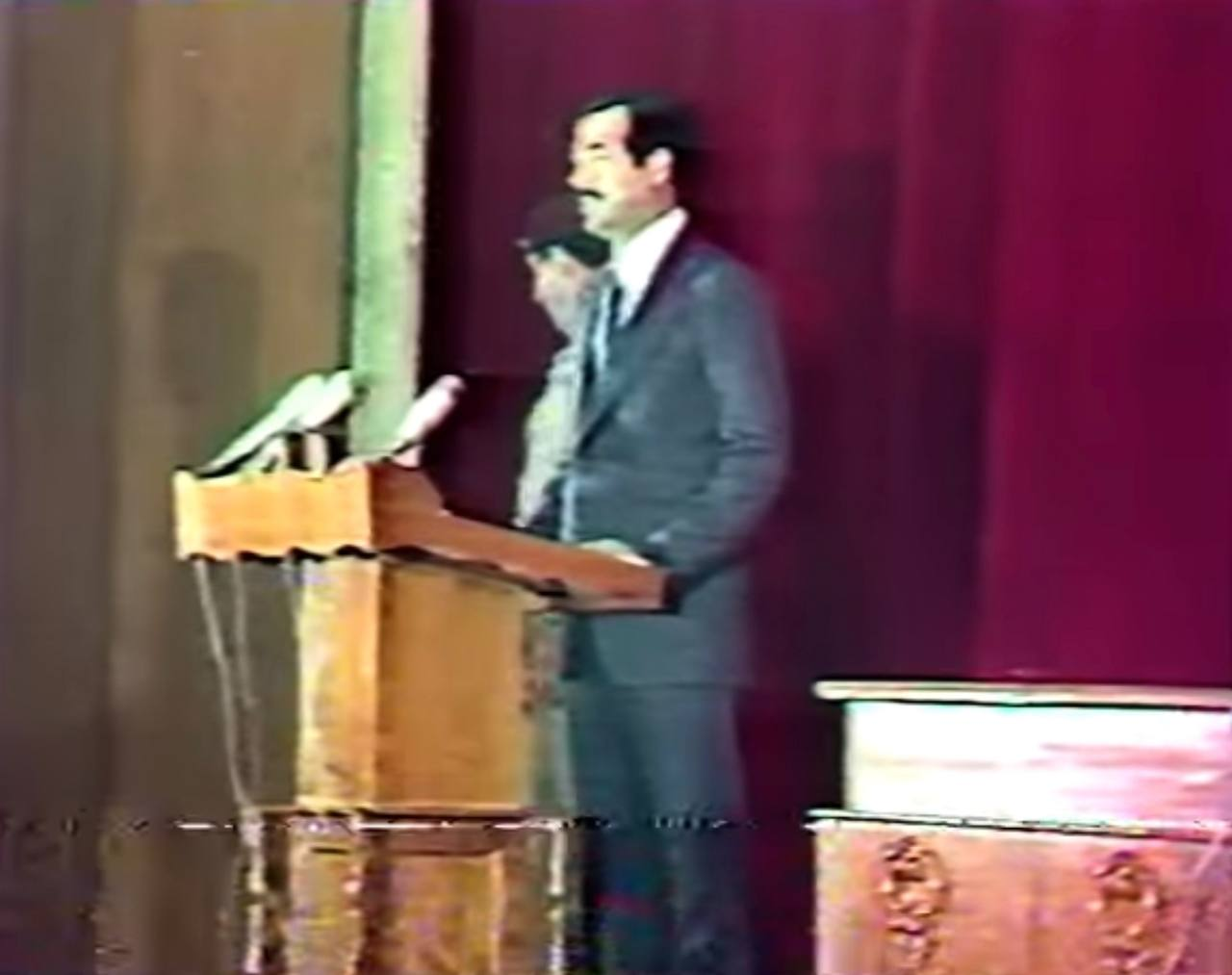
Still from an off-air recording of Saddam's speech during the purge

Saddam hurriedly convened an "emergency session" of party leaders on 22 July. During the assembly, which he ordered to be videotaped, he claimed to have uncovered a fifth column within the party. Abdul-Hussein "confessed" to be part of a Syrian-financed faction established in 1975 that played a major role in the Syrian-backed plot against the Iraqi government. He also gave the names of 68 alleged co-conspirators. These were removed from the room one by one as their names were called and taken into custody. After the list was read, Saddam congratulated those still seated in the room for their past and future loyalty. Those arrested at the meeting were subsequently tried together and found guilty of treason. Twenty-two of the accused, including five members of the RCC, were sentenced to death while thirty-three were given prison sentences and thirteen were released. Some party members were given weapons and directed to execute their comrades.

Some of the victims are listed below:

Name	Position
Mohammed Mahjoub al-Douri	
Muhammad Ayish Hamad	
Adnan al-Hamdani	
Ghanim Abdul-Jalil	Member of the Regional Command from 1974 to 1979
Muhyi Abdul-Hussein Mashhadi	Member of the Regional Command from 1974 to 1979; Secretary of president al-Bakr.

== Aftermath ==
Details of the events were publicised on 28 July 1979, and Iraqi media began accusing Syria of backing the alleged plot. Syrian Ba'athists responded by denying any relations to the coup plotters. On 8 August, the Iraqi News Agency announced that twenty-one of the twenty-two Iraqis were executed by firing squad for "their part in a plot to overthrow Iraq's new president". The twenty-second man was condemned to death in absentia because he was "nowhere to be found", the agency said. A tape of the assembly and of the executions was distributed throughout the country. Shortly thereafter, in early August 1979, Hussein took to the balcony of the presidential mansion in Baghdad to inform “a chanting crowd of 50,000 supporters that he had just witnessed the punishment the state court had ordered for 21 of those men: They had been executed by a firing squad. The crowd cheered.”

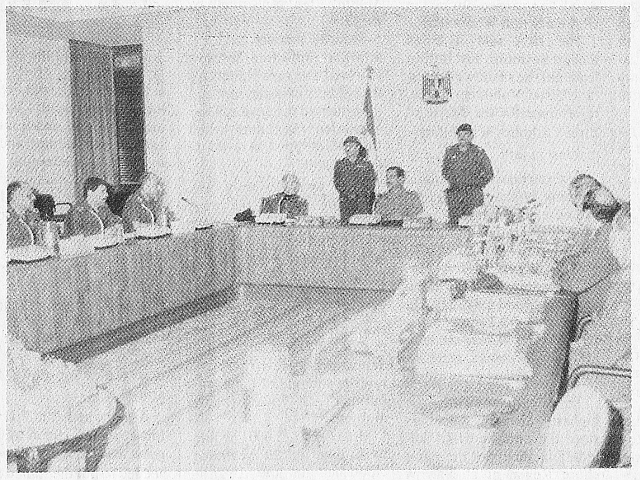
Joint meeting of the Revolutionary Command Council (RCC) and the Regional Command of the Arab Socialist Ba'ath Party – Iraq Region in Baghdad – Iraq, on 16 June 1988, presided by Iraqi President Saddam Hussein; on his right side is RCC deputy chairman Izzat Ibrahim ad-Duri.

The events led to a complete rupture of ties between the Ba'athist governments of Syria and Iraq. Hussein's personal conclusion, which he conveyed to Syrian president Assad, was that Syrian Ba'athists "were deep in the plot,” though he continued to provide Syria with the financial support originally offered during the 1978 Arab League summit. This agreement was eventually halted in 1980 with the outbreak of the Iran–Iraq War, during which Assad overtly aligned with Iran, spurring Iraq to accuse him of betraying Pan-Arabism. A 1981 secret memo issued to Syrian Ba'ath Party members by Assad further demonstrated the division between the two nations, with Assad declaring that Syria's policy was to prolong "the war to a degree that will facilitate the replacement of Saddam" and install the pro-Syrian Iraqi Nationalist Front in Iraq. Syria would go on to support Iraqi opposition parties for decades, including the pro-Iranian Shia Islamic Dawa Party. Iraq in turn supported the National Alliance for the Liberation of Syria, a coalition of Syrian opposition factions that included pro-Iraqi Syrian Ba'athists and Syrian Muslim Brotherhood, which opposed the Alawite-dominated Ba'ath Party rule in Syria. It also supported the Islamist revolts in Syria after 1980. Relations between the two countries remained strained until Saddam Hussein's overthrow in the invasion in 2003.

== See also ==
- The Great Purge, a purge in the Soviet Union orchestrated by General Secretary Joseph Stalin between 1936 and 1938.
- The Night of the Long Knives, a purge that took place in Nazi Germany from 30 June to 2 July 1934.
- January 13 massacre
