= Al-Karkh Islamic cemetery =

Second largest cemetery in Iraq

Coordinates: 33°18′50″N 44°02′28″E

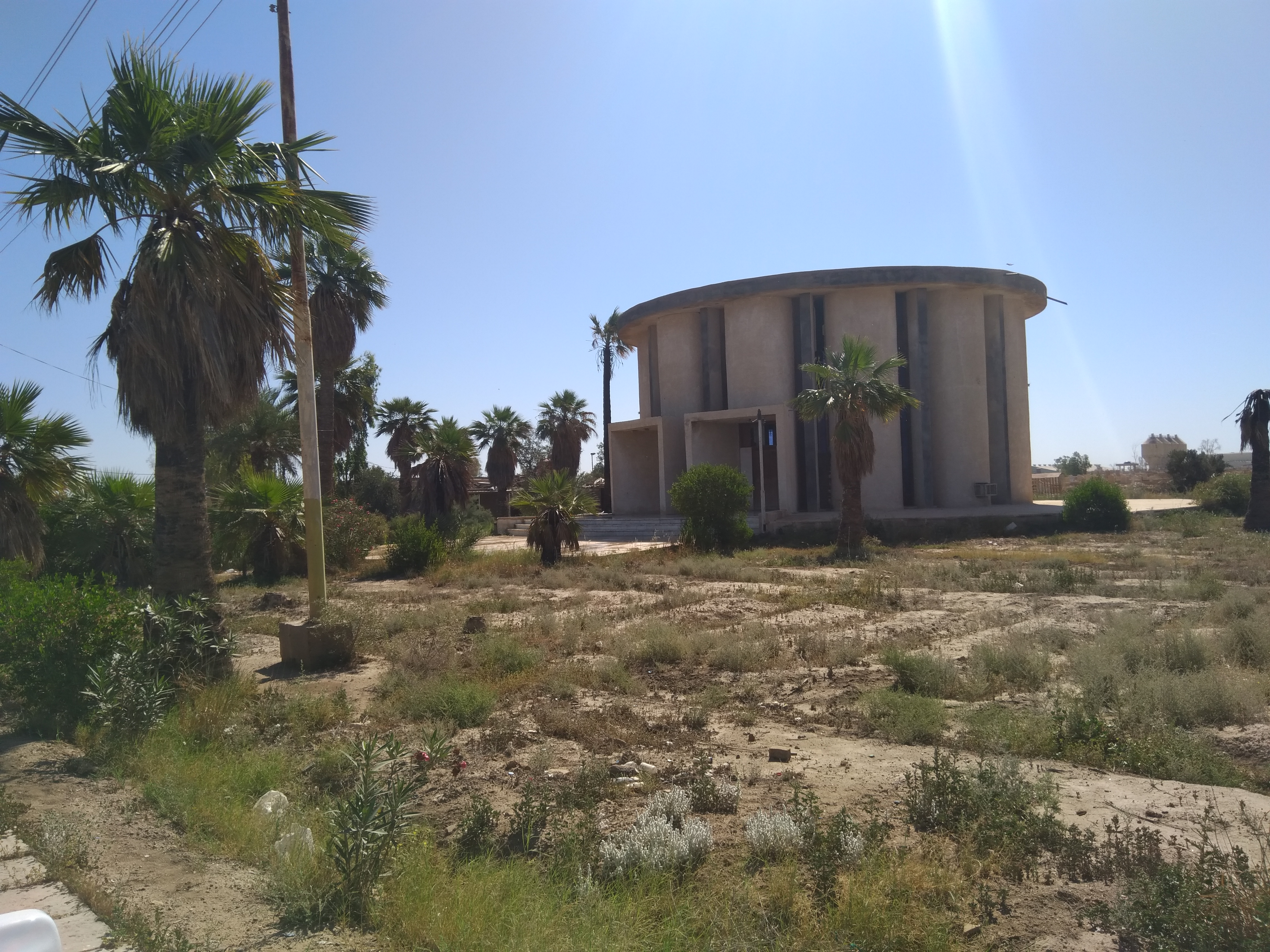
- The mausoleum over the graves of Hassan al-Bakr's family

Details
- Established: 1970
- Country: Iraq

Al-Karkh Islamic cemetery (Arabic: مقبرة الكرخ الإسلامية) is a cemetery located in the Nasr Wal-Salam town of Abu Ghraib, Iraq. It is located on the road that links Baghdad to al-Anbar, and is widely visited by families of those interred there. It is the location of former Iraqi president Ahmed Hassan al-Bakr's tomb.

== Notable burials ==
- Ahmed Hassan al-Bakr (1914–1982)
- Tahir Yahya (1916–1986)
- Abu Nidal (1937–2002)
