= Abdullah Sallum al-Samarra'i =

20th-century Iraqi Ba'athist politician

Minister of State
- In office 31 December 1969 – 15 May 1972
- Prime Minister: Ahmed Hassan al-Bakr

Minister of Culture and Information
- In office 30 July 1968 – 31 December 1969
- Prime Minister: Ahmed Hassan al-Bakr
- Preceded by: Taha Haj Elias
- Succeeded by: Hamid Alwan al-Juburi

Member of the Revolutionary Command Council
- In office November 1969 – 1970

Member of the Regional Command of the Iraqi Regional Branch
- In office 1964–1970

Personal details
- Born: 1932 Samarra, Kingdom of Iraq
- Died: 1996 (aged 63–64)
- Party: Iraqi Regional Branch of the Arab Socialist Ba'ath Party

Abdullah Sallum al-Samarra'i (Arabic: عبد الله سلوم السامرائي; 1932–1996) was an Iraqi Ba'athist politician and leading member of the Arab Socialist Ba'ath Party in Iraq. He was a member of the Regional Command from 1964 to 1970, when he was expelled.

== Biography ==
He was born in the city of Samarra in 1932 to a lower middle class family. He graduated from Baghdad University with a B.A. and an M.A. in Islamic history. Early on he was an active member of the Independence Party, but became a member of the Arab Socialist Ba'ath Party in Iraq in 1956. He was an associate of Saddam Hussein since the 1950s.

al-Samarra'i was one of the leading members of the Ba'ath Party following its November 1963 ousting from power, and became a member of the Iraqi Regional Command in 1964. At the 1969 Regional Congress of the Ba'ath Party in Iraq al-Samarra'i was re-elected as a member of the Iraqi Regional Command, and appointed to a seat in the Revolutionary Command Council (RCC). However, shortly after he was demoted from his post as Minister of Culture and Information to become Minister of State. The following year, in March 1970, al-Samara'i was removed from his seat in the RCC and the Iraqi Regional Command and became the Iraqi Ambassador to India. Al-Samarra'i was the first victim in a purge against the civilian wing of the party by Hussein.
