= Ghanim Abdul-Jalil =

Iraqi politician (1938–1979)

Member of the Revolutionary Command Council
- In office September 1977 – August 1979
- RCC Chairman: Ahmed Hassan al-Bakr

Member of the Regional Command of the Iraqi Regional Branch
- In office January 1974 – 16 July 1979
- RC Secretary: Ahmed Hassan al-Bakr

Personal details
- Born: 1938 Baghdad, Kingdom of Iraq
- Died: 8 August 1979 (aged 41) Ba'athist Iraq
- Cause of death: Execution by firing squad
- Party: Iraqi Regional Branch of the Arab Socialist Ba'ath Party

Ghanim Abdul-Jalil (1938 – 8 August 1979) was an Iraqi Ba'athist politician and leading member of the Arab Socialist Ba'ath Party in Iraq. He was a member of the Regional Command from 1974 to 1979.

== Career ==
Ghanim joined the Ba'ath party in 1954. He was imprisoned in the case of the 1959 attempted assassination of Abdul-Karim Qasim for 7 years and was pardoned in 1962, although he was not a participant in that attempt.

He graduated from the Faculty of Law and Politics in 1965. He was fired twice and arrested several times because of his political activities. He was appointed governor of Kirkuk in 1970, then Diyala in 1971, and then director general of Iraqi ports in 1971 as well. He was assigned to manage the operations of the Iraqi Company for Oil Operations after the decision to nationalize oil on 1 June 1972.

He was elected as a member of the regional leadership of the Baath Party at the beginning of 1974, then was appointed director of the office of the Vice-President of the Revolutionary Command Council Saddam Hussein in March 1974, and then took over the Ministry of Higher Education and Scientific Research on 11 November 1974 until 23 January 1977. After that, he continued as Minister of State. He was a member of the Revolutionary Command Council.

== Ba'ath Party purge ==
On 16 July 1979, President Saddam Hussein announced that his government had foiled a conspiracy between members of the Iraqi Ba'ath party and the Syrian Ba'athist government against the Iraqi Ba'athist government. At an emergency meeting at al-Khild Hall in Baghdad, Saddam ordered Mashhadi to confess that he had conspired against the Iraqi government. He identified 68 co-conspirators, who were all led out of the hall and executed afterwards in August.

A special court was formed to try the 68 defendants, and Ghanim was announced among the executed on 8 August 1979.
