= Abdul Khaliq al-Samarra'i =

Iraqi politician and Ba'ath Party official

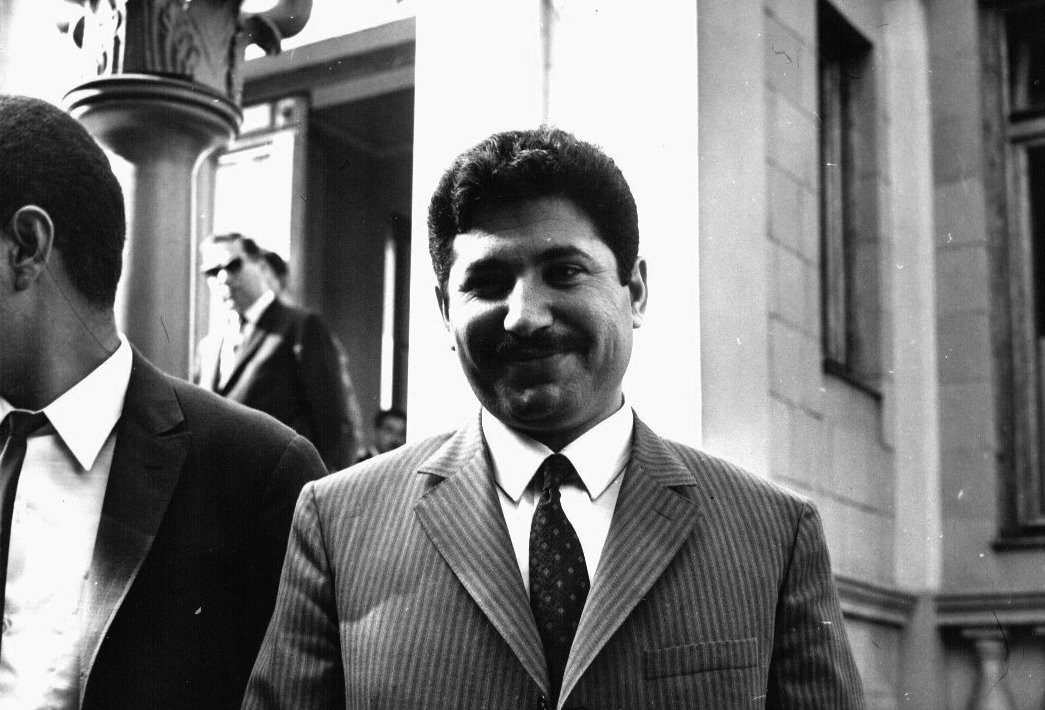

Member of the Revolutionary Command Council
- In office November 1969 – July 1973
- RCC Chairman: Ahmed Hassan al-Bakr

Member of the Regional Command of the Iraqi Regional Branch
- In office 1964 – July 1973
- RC Secretary: Ahmed Hassan al-Bakr

Personal details
- Born: 1935 Samarra, Kingdom of Iraq
- Died: 1979 (aged 44) Ba'athist Iraq
- Party: Iraqi Regional Branch of the Arab Socialist Ba'ath Party

Abdul Khaliq al-Samarra'i (Arabic: عبد الخالق السامرائي) was an Iraqi politician and leading member of the Ba'ath Party in Iraq. He was a member of the Regional Command from 1964 to 1973, and considered a serious rival of Saddam Hussein for leadership of the civilian faction of the Ba'ath Party. He was arrested in 1973 for his alleged involvement in a plot to overthrow the government, and executed in 1979 by Hussein.

== Biography ==
He was born in the city of Samarra into a wealthy family in 1935 and received a secondary education there. His father sent him to finish high school and university in Baghdad. He became a member of the Arab Socialist Ba'ath Party in Iraq in 1952, the Iraqi Regional Command in 1964, the National Command in 1968 and the Revolutionary Command Council (RCC) in 1969. In 1972, he was Chairman of the Cultural Bureau of the RCC. During the 1966 Ba'ath Party split, al-Samarra'i sided with Michel Aflaq. Throughout his tenureship, he was Saddam Hussein's most notable contender for the leadership of the civilian faction, and was considered the third most powerful man in Iraq by observers. By 1973, al-Samarra'i had become a focal point for those Ba'athists who still believed in the tenets of Ba'athism, and did not wish to follow blindly the rule of Ahmed Hassan al-Bakr.

In 1973, he became implicated in Nazim Kazzar's plot to overthrow the government. Following the failed coup attempt al-Samarra'i was found guilty of anti-state activities and arrested. There are several who doubt al-Samarra'i's involvement in the failed coup. Even so, al-Bakr never ratified his death sentence, and al-Samarra'i lived in solitary confinement until 1979. The reason that his execution was stayed was that Aflaq and Kamal Jumblatt, the leader of Lebanon’s National Front, campaigned actively against giving him a death sentence. Even so, in August 1979, Saddam executed al-Samarra'i along with others who Saddam claimed were members of a conspiracy to overthrow the government.
