= Abu Tubar =

Iraqi robber and serial killer

Hatem Kadhim "'Abu Tubar" al-Hadham
- "حاتم كاظم الهضم "أبو طبر
- Born: 1932; Hillah, Iraq
- Died: June 18, 1976 (age 43–44); Abu Ghraib Prison, Baghdad
- Cause of death: Execution by hanging
- Years active: 1973–1974
- Criminal charges: Murder; Burglary

Details
- Victims: 10+ known
- Country: Iraq

'Abu Tubar (Arabic: أبو طبر, lit. 'Father of the Hatchet') or ('The Hatchet Man') was the name given to the perpetrator of a series of robberies and murders committed in Baghdad, Iraq, during the early years of the Ba'ath Party rule with assistance. Although eventually ascribed to former members of Nadhim Kzar's (chief of the Directorate of General Security) police force, at the time there was widespread fear amongst the Baghdad population about the nature of the crimes. 'Abu Tubar was given the laqab "Father of the Hatchet" in the early 1970s.

It was later confirmed that 'Abu Tubar's real name was Hatem Kadhim al-Hadham (Arabic: حاتم كاظم الهضم); born 1932 in the city of Hillah in the Iraqi governorate of Babylon. During his criminal activities, Abu Tubar was known for bringing fears and terror among Iraqi civilians. He had a reputation for murdering families by chopping them with his hatchet. 'Abu Tubar usually began his crimes with a strange phone call, usually when the victim was alone at home. The call consisted of a useless conversation, threats, and cursing. After the phone call, there was a knock on the door, after which the crime began.

== Early life and career ==
Hatem Kadhim al-Hadham was born and raised in Babylon, Hilla, and came from a very well-known and generous family in Iraq. He graduated elementary school in 1946 and graduated middle school in 1949. After that, he went to a police school in Hillah and ended up graduating in 1951 with a commissioner rank of police of Hillah but was fired in 1952 for professional reasons. He immediately returned to college to study the Air Force; however, he was expelled in 1956 due to purposely fooling around in the air with the training planes. Al-Hadham knew multiple languages, including Arabic, English, German, Persian, and even Kurdish. After getting expelled, he traveled to Kuwait to study free business in 1957 and then returned to Iraq in 1959 to work as a collections accountant in Kirkuk. He was sentenced to two and a half years in jail due to allegedly damaging the company's state funds. After serving the time, al-Hadham left to travel around Europe, spending most of his time in West Germany, Munich. Hatem began to smuggle weapons and cars from Belgium, Germany, Greece, Syria, and Turkey.

== Murder spree ==
Al-Hadham usually began his crimes with a random phone call, either started by him or one of his assistants, usually when the victim was alone at home. The call consisted of a useless conversation, threats, and cursing towards the caller. After the phone call, there was a knock on the door, and once a person opened the door, the crime began. He usually brought a towel, iron rod, and a pistol into his crimes. After he was done, he would loot the houses and take back the loot using the family's car, which he would leave in a random spot.

Al-Hadham's first known murder was that of an unnamed Jewish person and his wife in Baghdad. He thought the household's family was wealthy but discovered that it was middle class. On 4 August 1973, he killed the retired police brigadier Bashir Ahmed al-Salman, alongside his family, while they were asleep on the rooftop of the house. Al-Hadham entered the house with his nephew Hussein by climbing the wall to the neighboring house and stayed in the garden of the house from one o'clock in the afternoon until two o'clock after midnight. From the neighbor's house, Hatem climbed the wall via the heater and then the cooling hole to the roof of the family's house. After the family was killed, the youngest being a 12-year-old named "Ahmed", their bodies were put into a bathtub and a bed. They transported the stolen goods in the victim's car to their house and then left the car near a hospital in Yarmouk.

One of al-Hathom's most well-known murders was the killing of the family of Jean-Ernest Hakim and a man who was identified to be a merchant named Murad Rashid. The Jean-Ernest family lived in Karrada district, and in late September 1937, al-Hadham, side by side with Hussein, entered the house by taking advantage of the family's hospitality. When a woman in the house was suspicious of him, he hit her with an iron rod, then proceeded to kill their family with their equipment and loot their house. Although Hussein was injured in the event. One of the final murders committed by al-Hadham took place in the area of al-Nuairiyya on an unidentified barber. Al-Hadham looted gold, money, furniture, and carpets from the house and escaped in a car, which he then left in al-Sha'al area. Al-Hadham's family helped him in covering up his crimes.

Ironically, during a widespread search of every Baghdadi household to find a person that matched the details of 'Abu Tubar', al-Hadham was among the many officials who were participating in the search. Which made co-workers doubt the discovery of 'Abu Tubar's identity when al-Hadham was captured and identified.

=== Public reaction in Iraq ===
During 'Abu Tubar's spree, his activities created an atmosphere of worry and fear among Iraqi citizens. Specifically, people in Baghdad reportedly became more cautious in their daily lives; they became very protective. Individuals no longer went out alone, began to trim any trees and bushes around the neighborhood to have a clear view of any potential hiding areas, and added more lights to keep them on all night for security. Being used to the safe environment in Iraq, these acts of 'Abu Tubar created tension and anxiety among the public, which paralyzed the country. People reportedly began to create curfews for themselves and locked their homes more regularly. Television programs began to give safety instructions to viewers, and so did call-in shows to train the citizens on what to do if they saw him or any suspicious acts being found. The scare continued for many months among Iraqis.

Then-Iraqi vice president Saddam Hussein touched on the subject in a speech he delivered during that time, referring to al-Hadham's crime spree as "the recent crimes that took place in Baghdad." A wide search was also conducted in Baghdad, searching the homes of Baghdadis and obtaining information on houses near the Republican Palace.

Following the US-led invasion of Iraq in 2003, 'Abu Tubar became the subject of legends and portrayals in Iraqi pop culture.

== Capture, confessions, and execution ==
On 30 March 1974, at 2:55 p.m., there was a report of a thief entering a neighbor's house that belonged to Dr. Joseph Paul Pedros Chadirji. The police came in time to catch the thief, but their records showed al-Hadham as one of the air forces. This allowed him to keep lying about what he had done until they asked him to show them his house. They found many stolen items in his home, from expensive radios to jewelry and clothing. Al-Hadham confessed on national television to the crimes he committed, as well as the help he received from his two brothers, Galib and Hazim, his nephew Hussein, and his wife.

When questioned about his motivations, 'Abu Tubar said he had two reasons why he killed people. The first was to move freely in houses and enable him to steal anything; the second was his enjoyment of murder. He admitted to having a psychological issue that sometimes he enjoyed killing, even drinking some of the victims' blood at times. Al-Hadham was executed in 1976 by being sentenced to death by hanging in Abu Ghraib prison.

== Connections to the Ba'ath Party ==
After 'Abu Tubar was captured, rumors started to emerge that he was somehow connected to the ruling Ba'ath Party and was created by the party to justify home searching and data collection of ordinary Iraqis. This rumor was revived by opponents of the former Ba'ath Party rule in recent years who claim that 'Abu Tubar was the creation of the Ba'ath Party. Some people don't believe that 'Abu Tubar was real and that he was instead a creation of security forces to cover up assassination attempts and dangerous attempts to overthrow the government.

Furthermore, the rumor was popularized by a television series that depicted 'Abu Tubar being paid by the Ba'ath Party to commit crimes. Karim Abd al-Razzaq al-Mashehdani, a writer who was involved in the case of 'Abu Tubar, wrote in the Iraq online cultural magazine al-Gardeniyya that there's no evidence that supports these claims and are simply fabrications motivated by political and ideological purposes to further demonize the previous Ba'ath rule.
