= Muhyi Abdul-Hussein Mashhadi =

Iraqi politician (1935–1979)

- محيي الدين عبد الحسين مشهدي

Member of the Revolutionary Command Council
- In office 4 September 1977 – 1 August 1979
- RCC Chairman: Ahmed Hassan al-Bakr; Saddam Hussien

Member of the Regional Command of the Iraqi Regional Branch
- In office 2 January 1974 – 16 July 1979
- RC Secretary: Ahmed Hassan al-Bakr

Personal details
- Born: 1935 Baghdad, Kingdom of Iraq
- Died: 8 August 1979 (aged 44) Ba'athist Iraq
- Party: Iraqi Regional Branch of the Arab Socialist Ba'ath Party

Muhyiddin Abdul-Hussein Mashhadi (Arabic: محيي الدين عبد الحسين مشهدي الشمري; 1935 – 8 August 1979) was an Iraqi Ba'athist politician and leading member of the Arab Socialist Ba'ath Party in Iraq. He was a member of the Regional Command and the Revolutionary Command Council and also was the secretary of President Ahmed Hassan al-Bakr. He was executed as part of the 1979 Ba'ath Party Purge.

== Ba'ath Party Purge ==
Mashhadi was the secretary of President Ahmed Hassan al-Bakr. Then-vice president Saddam Hussein had been monitoring him since the early months of his work as a secretary to the President. On 18 July 1979, President Saddam Hussein announced that his government had foiled a conspiracy between members of the Iraqi Ba'ath party and the Syrian Ba'athist government against the Iraqi Ba'athist government. Four days later, an emergency meeting at al-Khild Hall in Baghdad was set in motion by president Saddam and he ordered the event be recorded to set fear in the hearts of all members of the party and set an example out of Mashhadi for future members who will think about betraying Saddam or his ruling party. Mashhadi was ordered by Saddam to confess in front of all senior members that he had conspired against the Iraqi government and name some of his accomplices. Mashhadi, after having spent nearly two years as a member of the Revolutionary Command Council, was identified and tried as one of the 68 conspirators, who were all led out of the hall and 21 of whom were executed on 8 August 1979.

A special court was formed to try the 68 defendants, and Mashhadi's name was announced among the executed on 8 August 1979.
