= Torture Central =

2007 memoir of Michael Keller

Torture Central: E-mails From Abu Ghraib
- Author: Michael Keller
- Language: English
- Genre: Memoir
- Publication date: October 29, 2007
- Publication place: United States
- ISBN: 9781935278061

Torture Central: E-mails From Abu Ghraib is the title of the memoir of Michael Keller, an American soldier stationed in Abu Ghraib, Iraq during 2005-2006. It was published on October 29, 2007, and chronicles many events previously unreported in the news media, including torture that continued at Abu Ghraib over a year after the abuse photos were published.
