= Nadhim Kzar =

Iraqi politician

Personal details
- Born: 1940 Amarah, Iraq
- Died: July 8, 1973

Nadhim Kzar (1940 - July 8, 1973) was an Iraqi engineer and intelligence official. He was the first head of the Iraqi Directorate of General Security.

== Biography ==
Kzar was born in 1940 in Amarah, Iraq. He studied engineering at the Technical Institute in Baghdad, and joined the Arab Socialist Ba'ath Party – Iraq Region in 1959 as a student. He was one of the first Shia to hold a position of power in the regime. He was briefly imprisoned by Abdul Salam Arif in 1964/5.

Kzar was appointed first head of Directorate of General Security in 1969. According to author Con Coughlin, "Hundreds if not thousands of people perished at the hands of Kazzar's security forces, many of them tortured to death at the Palace of the End." Coughlin also described him as "the Beria of the Baath Party."

Kzar is reputed to have personally beaten to death Islamic scholar and government opponent Abd al-Aziz al-Badri.

In July 1973, allegedly motivated by the dominance of Sunnis in Iraq, he led an unsuccessful coup against President Ahmed Hassan al-Bakr. He took hostage the minister of interior Saadoun Ghaidan and minister of defense Hamid Shehab. He had intended to assassinate Bakr when his plane landed in Baghdad, but the flight was late and the assassination attempt was aborted. He shot dead Shehab (Gheidan was injured, but feigned death and survived) and then was captured as he attempted to flee to Iran.

On July 7 Kzar was tried over the coup by the Iraqi Revolutionary Command Council under Izzat Ibrahim al-Douri. He was executed the following day, on July 8, 1973.
