= Hardan al-Tikriti =

Iraqi military officer and politician (1925–1971)

- حردان عبدالغفار التكريتي
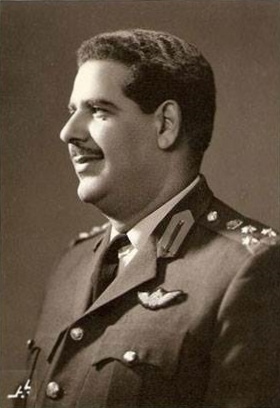

Vice President of Iraq
- In office 3 April 1970 – 15 October 1970 Serving with Saddam Hussein and Salih Mahdi Ammash
- President: Ahmed Hassan al-Bakr
- Preceded by: Saddam Hussein
- Succeeded by: Salih Mahdi Ammash

Minister of Defence
- In office 30 July 1968 – 15 October 1970
- Preceded by: Ibrahim Abdel Rahman Dawoud
- Succeeded by: Hammad Shihab

Member of the Revolutionary Command Council
- In office 17 July 1968 – 15 October 1970

Member of the Regional Command of the Iraqi Regional Branch
- In office February 1964 – October 1966

Personal details
- Born: 1925 Tikrit, Mandatory Iraq
- Died: 30 March 1971 (aged 45–46) Kuwait
- Cause of death: Assassination
- Party: Iraqi Regional Branch of the Arab Socialist Ba'ath Party

Military service
- Allegiance: Iraq
- Branch/service: Iraqi Air Force
- Years of service: 1946–1969
- Rank: Air Marshal or Lieutenant General
- Battles/wars: 1948 Arab-Israeli War; Ramadan Revolution; November 1963 Iraqi coup d'état

Hardan Abdul Ghaffar al-Tikriti (Arabic: حردان عبدالغفار التكريتي; 1925 – 30 March 1971) was an Iraqi military officer and politician. A senior commander in the Iraqi Air Force, he was a high-ranking official in the Ba'ath Party and Ba'athist government during the late 1960s. He also served as Iraq's minister of defence from 1968 to 1970 and as vice president–serving alongside Saddam Hussein–in 1970. Al-Tikriti was assassinated in 1970, in Kuwait, on the orders of Saddam Hussein.

== Early life ==
Hardan was born in 1925 in Tikrit. His father was a police officer, a Sunni Arab and a member of the tribe of Al-Shiyasha.

== Military and political career ==
As an officer in the Iraqi Air Force, he was educated at the flight academy in Baghdad and was commissioned as a Flying Officer in 1946. In 1961, Hardan joined the Baath Party and played a key role in both the 1963 and 1968 revolutions in Iraq.

By the start of 1963, Hardan was the commander of the Iraqi Air Force base near Mosul. On 8 March 1963, with the Baath Party fighting to gain control of Syria, Hardan ordered an air attack on the part of the Syrian air base at Aleppo that was in the hands of supporters of the old government. However, whilst the strike aircraft were en route, the Syrian Baathists took the air base and the attack was cancelled.

During the period in 1963 when the Baathists were in power in Iraq, Hardan was appointed as commander of the entire Iraqi Air Force. However, when the President Abdul Salam Arif withdrew his support from the Baath Party in late 1963, Hardan followed suit. Hardan then relinquished his command and was appointed Defence Minister in which capacity he served from November 1963 until March 1964.

== Role in the 1963 February coup d'etat (Ramadan Revolution) ==
Prior to the coup, Hardan came together with other major political figures in the Ba'ath Party and Nationalist officers to carry out the plans made for the change in government. Military officials felt that too many civilians and important leaders had been wrongfully killed under Abdul Karim Qasim, the head of state at the time. Qasim has also aligned himself with some militias of the Iraqi Communist Party (ICP) who were imposing violence on the public in Iraq. Key players in this coup attempt included Ahmed Hassan al-Bakr, Salih Mahdi Ammash, Abdul Sattar, Abdul Latif, Mundhir al-Wandawi, Makki al-Hashimi, Tahir Yahya, and Hardan al-Tikriti. Abdul Karim Qasim was to be removed from his position in office and to do this the commander of the Air Force, Jalal al-Awqati, who was aligned with the ICP, was to be assassinated. They also believed that the capture of Qasim and his sentencing to death was necessary for the transfer of power to take place. On 8 February, after Qasim's seat was captured by members of the coup, he was killed and his body was displayed on television for all of Iraq to see. Abdul Salam Arif was the person placed into the presidential seat by the National Command of the Revolutionary Council (NCRC) after the coup. He appointed Ahmad Hasan al-Bakr, a devoted Ba'athists, to be his vice president and Ali Salih al-Sa'di as his minister of the interior. Although Arif was the president, al-Sa'di managed to maintain most power among the three because he was the leader of the Ba'ath Party at the time. Bakr was also a member of the Ba'ath Party; Arif, on the other hand, was not. The government setup with Arif, Sa'di, and Bakr had no firm foundation because of the way that these men assumed their positions (the coup) of power. There was also an inability to find stability and common agreement among the three men. Opposing views began to surface as a result of unresolved opinions regarding the direction of the state of Iraq and an imbalance of power between Arif, Bakr, and Sa'di.

On 18 November 1963, Hardan would once again assist in a power transfer. This time, it was in collusion with the current President of Iraq, Abdul Salam Arif. Arif wanted to regain control of the state that was handed to him by the NCRC, so he brought Hardan and Tahir Yahya together to launch an attack on the National Guard currently residing in Baghdad. Arif managed to regain his control over the state after the attack, also making the decision to remove Sa'di from the government because he had become a threat to Arif and the Iraqi people. Sa'di was accused of attempts to spread socialism throughout the state, corrupting the government setup that Arif had in play. On November 11, after being asked to step down from his position in government as Minister of Interior, Sa'di refused and went on with his plans to attend the Extraordinary Regional Conference. At the conference, he planned to have Hardan al-Tikriti, along with others who threatened his power and intentions, removed from their political positions. Instead, Sa'di was met by the National Guard who arrested him and the rest of his supporters, forcing them onto a plane set to leave the state and land in Madrid.

== Role in the July 1968 coup d'etat ==
Hardan played the major role in this coup by delivering the final blow. During the 1968 coup, in the early hours of 17 July 1968, Hardan telephoned the sitting prime minister Abdul Rahman Arif to inform him that he had been removed from office. Hardan then escorted Arif to the airport where the deposed prime minister was flown out of the country.

== Minister of Defence (1968 to 1970) ==
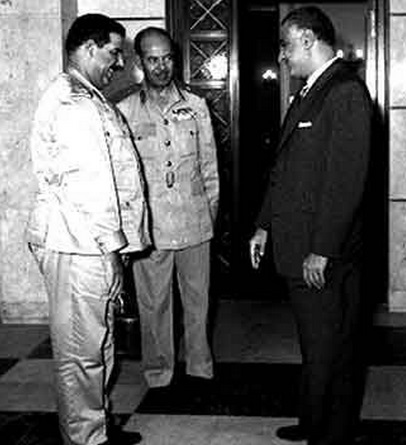
Al-Tikriti (left) meeting with Egyptian president Gamal Abdel Nasser (right) and Egyptian defense minister Mohamed Fawzi in Cairo, 1969

Hardan was re-appointed minister of defence in the aftermath of the 1968 coup. During his time as defence minister, Hardan was instrumental in securing large-scale military aid for Iraq from the Soviet Union.

Although Hardan was promoted in office, there was still one remaining man ahead of him with the power to control him – Saadoun Ghaidan. In order to change this, Hardan needed to gain the favor of Ghaidan, which he managed to do with the help of Hasan al-Bakr. Ghaidan decided to join the two members of the Ba'athist Party by helping overthrow al-Dawud and his Republican Guard. After that was done, the Ba'athist Party was fully restored to power in Iraq on July 30, 1968.

With Hasan al-Bakr assuming the position as the president of Iraq, Hardan as the defence minister and premier deputy, and Salih Mahdi Ammash as the minister of interior, the Ba'athist regime was on its way to successfully controlling the country. After some time in their respective offices, the men began to grow concerned with each man's next move. Ammash, Bakr, and Hardan al-Tikriti had helped each other make their way to the top with the 1968 coup. The positions they held in government were very powerful and each one of them was only looking for a way to increase that power and extend his control and influence within the government. Hasan al-Bakr had managed to gain the support of Saddam Hussein, who helped boost his own career and popularity, placing him a few steps above Ammash and Hardan. Saddam needed a way into a higher position in government. Because he didn't have a strong military background, it would have been a little harder for him to gain power. He thought strategically that Bakr was his key to that power. He aligned himself with Bakr by supporting his policies. Slowly he started to work through Bakr, making him his puppet. By aligning himself with Hasan al-Bakr and other powerful figures within the state, he was in a safety zone. In order to keep making advancements, Saddam had to recognize that most of the power in the state lay within the hands of military forces and the men controlling it; those men happened to have been Bakr, Hardan, and Ammash. Since Saddam had already aligned himself with Bakr, the only two threats remaining were Hardan and Ammash. Both men also recognized the threat that Saddam posed to their careers. Hardan was the biggest political challenge because the military had become his stronghold where he controlled almost all if not everything that concerned the military.

== Fall from power and assassination ==
Because Hardan recognized what Saddam Hussein's intentions had been, he started to set up a strategy of his own. In 1969, Hardan tried to show his power and authority by convincing Bakr to send Saddam into exile for having questioned his power and motives in front of the council. Saddam was sent away on a plane just as several other exiled Iraqis in the past had been, but he was to return just one week later with vengeance in his heart. After having returned to Iraq, Saddam set out to destroy Hardan right away. First, he had his Deputy Premier Position taken away by merging the title into the president's position. Saddam did this by simply convincing Bakr that Hardan was after his presidential seat. Listening to what Saddam suggested, Bakr started to implement a plan that would strip Hardan of actual controlling power. Hardan al-Tikriti was soon given the position as vice president, but this meant nothing because he no longer had the power to control cabinet meetings. Finally, on 15 October 1970, Hardan was dismissed from all the positions he carried because he was accused of disregarding the efforts of the Ba'athist Party to help the Arabs. These posts included the Minister of Defence and Deputy Premier of Iraq. He was also dismissed from the Revolutionary Command Council. The charge against him meant that he wasn't helping the Ba'ath live up to their oath to help protect the Palestinians. This charge was based on his opposition to Saddam Hussein's plans to use an Iraqi brigade located in Jordan to support Palestinians against the Jordanian government in the Black September uprising. Hardan was later sent into exile and like all others he was put on a plane and flown out of the state. He was sent to Madrid initially. He returned weeks later to Iraq to try to clear his record. However, he was unsuccessful and was turned around right away and sent to Algeria to be the Iraqi Ambassador. He wasn't accepted there, so he later left. After a period of exile in London, Hardan was appointed as Iraqi Ambassador to Sweden. However, Hardan disliked being away from the Iraqi political scene, and he traveled to Kuwait from where he attempted to organize a coup against Ahmed Hassan al-Bakr and Saddam Hussein. On 30 March 1971, Hardan was killed in a car belonging to the Iraqi Embassy during a medical checkup at a hospital in Kuwait.

== Place of burial ==
Hardan was buried in Tikrit, and his burial site was destroyed by ISIS on 11 February 2014 when they planted IEDs in it.

Political offices
Preceded by Ibrahim Abdel Rahman Dawoud	Defence Minister of Iraq; 1968–1970	Succeeded by Hammad Shihab
