= Al-Tikriti =

The Arabic nisba al-Tikriti refers to people who were either born in or whose family were from the Iraqi town of Tikrit. In particular it may refer to:

- Abu Raita al-Takriti, 8th century Christian theologian
- Ali Hassan Abd al-Majid al-Tikriti, former Ba'athist Iraqi Defense Minister and military commander
- Barzan Ibrahim al-Tikriti, half-brother of Saddam Hussein and leader of the Iraqi Intelligence Service, hanged in 2007
- Hardan al-Tikriti, Iraqi Air Force commander, politician and ambassador
- Omar al-Tikriti, son of Barzan Ibrahim al-Tikriti wanted in Iraq for committing acts of terror
- Rafi' Daham Al-Tikriti, director of the Iraqi Intelligence Service, former Iraqi Ambassador to Turkey and former Head of the Iraqi Secret Services
- Sabawi Ibrahim al-Tikriti, half brother of Saddam Hussein, leader of the Iraqi Intelligence Service and presidential advisor
- Saddam Hussein Abd al-Majid al-Tikriti, President of Iraq from 1979 to 2003
