= Abdul Razzaq an-Naif =

Iraqi military officer and general (1934–1978)

Abdul Razzaq al-Naif
- عَبْد الرَّزَّاق سَعِيد النَّايِف

Prime Minister of Iraq
- In office 17 July 1968 – 30 July 1968
- President: Ahmed Hassan al-Bakr
- Preceded by: Tahir Yahya
- Succeeded by: Ahmed Hassan al-Bakr

Personal details
- Born: 1934 Fallujah, Al Anbar, Kingdom of Iraq (present-day Iraq)
- Died: 10 July 1978 (aged 43–44) London, England
- Cause of death: Assassination
- Party: Independent
- Occupation: Military officer
- Profession: Military officer, civil servant

Military service
- Allegiance: Kingdom of Iraq (1954–1958); Iraqi Republic (1958–1968)
- Branch/service: Iraqi Ground Forces
- Years of service: 1954–1968
- Battles/wars: First Iraqi–Kurdish War; Six-Day War

Abdul Razzaq Said al-Naif (Arabic: عَبْد الرَّزَّاق سَعِيد النَّايِف; 1934 – 10 July 1978) was an Iraqi military officer and politician who briefly served as the Prime Minister of Iraq in July 1968 until he was deposed in the same month of that year. He was assassinated in 1978 under the orders of Saddam Hussein.

== Early life and military career ==
Al-Naif graduated from the Iraqi Military Academy in 1954. He served as second lieutenant in the Iraqi Army's 9th Infantry Brigade until 1956. He graduated from the Iraqi Military Staff College in 1960 and was promoted to Staff Captain. He then became instructor in the Iraqi Military Staff College in the same year. In 1963, he attended the Sandhurst Military Intelligence Academy in Britain. In 1964, then President of Iraq Abdul Salam Arif appointed then Staff Major Al-Naif as Deputy Director Military Intelligence.

== Political career ==
After the death of Abdul Salam Arif in a helicopter crash in 1966, Al-Naif was appointed Senior Advisor to President Abdul Rahman Arif, and then National Security Advisor, but remained Deputy Director of Military Intelligence. From 1966 to 1968, Al-Naif played a major role in negotiating peace with the Kurdish nationist leader, Mustafa Barzani, who had a close relationship with Al-Naif. It was reported that during the Kurdish revolt in Northern Iraq in the 1960s, Al-Naif convinced the Iraqi government to negotiate with the Kurdish separatist leadership rather than resort to military confrontation with them. He held regular secret meetings with Barzani and was instrumental in bringing the First Iraqi-Kurdish War to a peaceful end.

In 1968, Al-Naif became the youngest Prime Minister of Iraq, at the age of 34. He appointed the first and last inclusive cabinet in Iraq. His cabinet, which he called a coalition cabinet was the largest cabinet in Iraqi history. It included representatives from all ethnic and religious members of the Iraqi population, with several Ministers appointed without portfolios. For the first time in Iraqi history, the Vice Prime Minister and Vice President were both Kurds. But soon after his appointment he was deposed by a Ba’ath Party coup d'état, and exiled to Morocco as Ambassador to Rabat.

People closest to Al-Naif spoke of him as being an independent politician with revolutionary ideas. He did not hesitate to express his opposition to communism and Soviet expansion, and was inspired by the American political system. He had read the biography of John F Kennedy in Arabic several times and was inspired by Kennedy's courage and revolutionary ideas of human rights and equality. He focused on Iraqi domestic issues and did not get involved in regional Arab issues outside of Iraq. He remained independent throughout his political career but when he formed his cabinet in 1968, he included members of every Iraqi political party.

== Exile ==
After the Ba'ath deposition, Al-Naif was then exiled to Switzerland, where he served as Representative to the United Nations in Geneva. It was reported that while he served as Ambassador of Iraq to Switzerland, he secretly headed the opposition movement to the Ba’ath government in Iraq, then led by Saddam Hussein.

In 1969, Al-Naif secretly returned to Northern Iraq and was welcomed back and protected by the Barzani, and also by the Iraqi troops that were sent to fight the Kurdish militants. He was considered a well-respected officer of the Iraqi military.

He remained in Northern Iraq until 1972, when he left Iraq and moved to Britain with his family. As he arrived in Britain, the Iraqi Government of Saddam Hussein sentenced Al-Naif to death in absentia. It is unknown why he decided to leave Northern Iraq, but he maintained close relationships with the Kurdish leaders and Iraqi opposition to the Ba’ath Party. There are reports that he became concerned that his anti Ba’ath coalition movement was infiltrated by Saddam Hussein's secret Mukhabarat apparatus and he was informed of attempts to assassinate him in Northern Iraq by them.

Al-Naif enjoyed a good relationship with the Shah of Iran Mohammed Reza Pahlavi, Jordan's King Hussein and Saudi Arabia's King Faisal bin Abdul Aziz, who supported his opposition to Saddam Hussein's Ba’ath Party Government in Iraq.

== 1972 assassination attempt ==
In 1972, the Ba'athist government in Iraq sent assassins disguised as Iraqi diplomats to assassinate Al-Naif in London, but that attempt was foiled by Al-Naif's wife Lamia, who stood in the line of fire and shielded him. She recovered from her injuries after surgery at London's Middlesex Hospital.

== Death ==
Al-Naif then moved to Jordan, where he enjoyed a close friendship with Jordan's King Hussein.

Al-Naif was assassinated, while visiting Britain on 9 July 1978, under the orders of Saddam Hussein. He was critically injured from multiple gunshot wounds as he left the Intercontinental Hotel in London's Park Lane and died the following day.

His body was transported to Jordan where he was buried on the orders of Jordan's King Hussein. As the evidence showed the Iraqi government's involvement in Al-Naif's assassination, Britain cut off diplomatic relations with Iraq and ordered all Iraqi diplomats out of Britain. This was immediately reciprocated by Iraq. Two men were quickly arrested in Britain and accused of the killing. The assassins were named as Salem Ahmed Hassan, a Palestinian belonging to the Abu Nidal terrorist group, who was charged and sentenced to life in prison in 1979, and Sadoun Shakir, the head of the Iraqi Intelligence Service, who entered Britain under a false name using an Iraqi diplomatic passport. Shakir was exchanged for two British hostages arrested in Iraq after Al-Naif's assassination.

King Hussein of Jordan hosted Al-Naif's family in Jordan after Al-Naif's assassination and personally attended to their security and well-being.

Political offices
Preceded by Tahir Yahya	Prime Minister of Iraq; 1968	Succeeded by Ahmed Hassan al-Bakr
