= Qasr al-Nihayah =

For the former prison in Tehran, Iran, see Museum of the Qasr Prison.

Qasr al-Nihayah, also known as the Palace of the End, was a building in Baghdad, Iraq which housed a prison used for interrogations, sometimes referred to as "torture", by the Baath Party under Saddam Hussein. It was bombed and destroyed by the United States in March 2003. It was described as "perhaps the most feared destination in Iraq until its demolition" by Martin Amis in The Guardian.

According to author Con Coughlin, "Hundreds if not thousands of people perished at the hands of Kazzar's security forces, many of them tortured to death at the Palace of the End."
