= Ali Salih al-Sa'di =

Iraqi politician (1928–1977)

- علي صالح السعدي
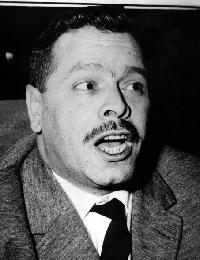

De facto leader of the Iraqi Republic
- In office 8 February 1963 – 18 November 1963
- Preceded by: Abd al-Karim Qasim (as Prime Minister of Iraq)
- Succeeded by: Abdul Salam Arif (as President of Iraq)

Ministry of Interior (Iraq)
- In office February 1963 – 9 June 1963

Minister of Guidance
- In office June 1963 – November 1963

Deputy Prime Minister
- In office 8 February 1963 – 18 November 1963
- Prime Minister: Ahmed Hassan al-Bakr

Personal details
- Born: 1928
- Died: September 19, 1977 (aged 48–49)
- Party: Arab Socialist Ba'ath Party – Iraq Region (Ba'ath Party (Iraqi-dominated faction))
- Other political affiliations: Arab Socialist Ba'ath Party
- Education: Baghdad University

Ali Salih al-Sa'di (Arabic: علي صالح السعدي; 1928 – September 19, 1977) was an Iraqi politician. He was General Secretary of the Iraqi branch of the Ba'ath Party from the late 1950s until the November 1963 Iraqi coup d'état. From February 8, 1963 (Ramadan Revolution) until the November 1963 Iraqi coup d'état, he was deputy prime minister under Ahmed Hassan al-Bakr, minister of the interior and as commander of the National Guard (Al-Haras al-Watani).

== Career ==
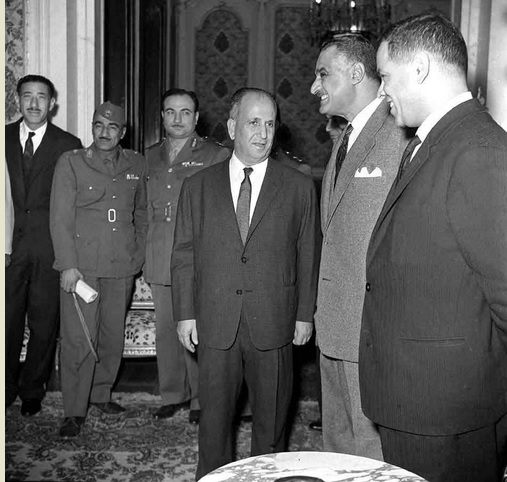
Delegations attending the 1963 unity talks between Egypt, Syria and Iraq in Cairo. From left to right: Kamel el-Din Hussein of Egypt, N/A, Anwar Sadat of Egypt, Abdel Hakim Amer of Egypt, an Iraqi officer, Ziad al-Hariri of Syria, Nahid al-Qasim of Syria, Gamal Abdel Nasser of Egypt, and Ali Salih al-Saadi of Iraq

Ali Salih as-Sa'di was born into the Shia Arab tribe of Banu Sa'd from Diyala. In 1955 he graduated from Baghdad University with a degree in economics and joined the Ba'ath Party in Iraq. On July 14, 1958, military leaders under Abd al-Karim Qasim overthrew the Hashemite monarchy. Prominent members of the Ba'ath Party violently opposed Qasim, forcing them into exile. In 1959, Saddam Hussein was injured in an attempt to assassinate Qasim and went into exile via Syria (then part of the United Arab Republic) to Cairo, Egypt. Ali al-Sa'di remained in Baghdad as General Secretary of the Iraqi branch of the Ba'ath Party.

== Ramadan Revolution ==
The Iraqi Ba'ath Party overthrew and executed Qasim in a violent coup on February 8, 1963; long suspected to be supported by the United States Central Intelligence Agency (CIA), however pertinent contemporary documents relating to the CIA's operations in Iraq have remained classified by the U.S. government, although the Ba'athists are documented to have maintained supportive relationships with U.S. officials before, during, and after the coup. Al-Sa'di himself is quoted as saying that the Ba'athists "came to power on a CIA train." Initially, many of Qasim's Shi'ite supporters believed that he had merely gone into hiding and would appear like the Mahdi to lead a rebellion against the new government; to counter this sentiment and terrorize his supporters, Qasim's dead body was displayed on television in a five minute long propaganda video called The End of the Criminals that included close-up views of his bullet wounds amid disrespectful treatment of his corpse, which is spat on in the final scene.

As the secretary general of the Ba'ath Party, al-Sa'di was effectively the new leader of Iraq; through his control of the National Guard militia (commanded by Mundhir al-Wanadawi), al-Sa'di exercised more power than the prime minister—prominent Ba'athist general Ahmed Hassan al-Bakr—or the largely ceremonial president, Abdul Salam Arif. The nine-month rule of al-Sa'di and his civilian branch of the Ba'ath Party has been described as "a reign of terror" as the National Guard, under orders from the Revolutionary Command Council (RCC) "to annihilate anyone who disturbs the peace," detained, tortured, or executed thousands of suspected Qasim loyalists. Furthermore, the National Guard—which developed from a core group of perhaps 5,000 civilian Ba'athist partisans but increased to 34,000 members by August 1963, with members identified by their green armbands—was poorly disciplined, as militiamen engaged in extensive infighting, creating a widespread perception of chaos and disorder. Marion Farouk-Sluglett and Peter Sluglett describe the Ba'athists as having cultivated a "profoundly unsavory image" through "acts of wanton brutality" on a scale without prior precedent in Iraq, including "some of the most terrible scenes of violence hitherto experienced in the post-war Middle East".

It has long been suspected that the CIA (and other U.S. government agencies) provided the Ba'athist government with lists of communists and other leftists, who were then arrested or killed by the National Guard under al-Wanadawi's and al-Sa'di's direction. Gibson emphasizes that the Ba'athists compiled their own lists, citing Bureau of Intelligence and Research reports. On the other hand, Citino and Wolfe-Hunnicutt consider the allegations plausible because the U.S. embassy in Iraq had actually compiled such lists, were known to be in contact with the National Guard during the purge, and because National Guard members involved in the purge received training in the U.S. Furthermore, Wolfe-Hunnicutt, citing contemporary U.S. counterinsurgency doctrine, notes that the assertions "would be consistent with American special warfare doctrine" regarding U.S. covert support to anti-communist "Hunter-Killer" teams "seeking the violent overthrow of a communist dominated and supported government", and draws parallels to other CIA operations in which lists of suspected communists were compiled, such as Guatemala in 1954 and Indonesia in 1965-66. Between 300 and 5,000 communist sympathizers were killed in street fighting in Baghdad, along with 80 Ba'ath Party members.

Al-Sa'di was in favor of a radical socialist course, which was not universally accepted in the Iraqi branch of the Ba'ath party. In the first decade of its existence, it focused on pan-Arab slogans, only vaguely mentioning socialism. Such a policy was also opposed by those officers who supported the new government, although they did not belong to the Ba'ath party, but opted for pan-Arabism and the union with Egypt.

== Partisan maneuvers and overthrow ==
In October 1963, at the all-Arab Sixth Congress (National Congress) of the Ba'ath Party in Damascus, al-Sa'di managed to get founders Michel Aflaq and Salah al-Din al-Bitar voted out of office. On November 11, al-Sa'di and his supporters called an "extraordinary party conference" to expel al-Bakr and other rivals from the party. Bakr-loyal Ba'ath officers arrested them, after which on November 13 National Guard members loyal to al-Sa'di bombed targets in Baghdad and rampaged through the capital for five days. al-Bakr summoned President Arif, who as commander-in-chief of the army restored peace and order with the military coup of November 18, 1963. Despite having collaborated with al-Bakr to remove al-Sa'di, Arif purged Ba'athists, including al-Bakr, from his new government.
