= Rafi Daham al-Tikriti =

Iraqi politician (1937–1999)

Rafi Daham Mejwel Al-Tikriti رافع دحام مجول التكريتي
- In office 17 June 1976 – 11 October 1999
- Preceded by: Unknown
- Succeeded by: Unknown

Member of the Iraqi Revolutionary Command Council

Chief of the Iraqi Intelligence Service

Iraqi Ambassador to Turkey

Director of the Iraqi Secret Services

Iraqi Ambassador to Spain

Personal details
- Born: 24 April 1937; Tikrit
- Died: 11 October 1999 (aged 62); Al-Jadriya
- Political party: Ba'ath Arab Socialist Party

Rafi' Dahham Mejwel Al-Hazza Al-Tikriti (Arabic: رافع دحام مجول الهزاع التكريتي; 24 April 1937 – 11 October 1999) was Saddam Hussein’s second cousin, member of the Iraqi Revolutionary Command Council, Director of the Iraqi Intelligence Service, the former Iraqi Ambassador to Turkey, and former Head of the Iraqi Secret Services, which is equivalent to the Federal Bureau of Investigation (FBI) of the United States when conducting domestic activities. He was one of the well known political figures in Iraq. The former Iraqi Government during Saddam Hussein era announced his official death date as 11 October 1999, whereupon he was buried in Tikrit, Salah ad Din, which is the home town of many senior members of the Iraqi government during the Saddam era.
