= Al Nasr Wal Salam =

Coordinates: 33°18′17″N 44°01′39″E

Al Nasr Wal Salam or Nasser Wa Salaam (Arabic: النصر والسلام, also known as Al-Hasuah) is a city in the Abu Ghraib district of Baghdad Governorate, about 30 km (18.6 mi) west of Baghdad. It has 208,506 inhabitants..
