= Abu Ghraib District =

District in Baghdad Governorate, Iraq

Coordinates: 33°17′30.98″N 44°4′9.08″E

Abu-Ghraib (Arabic: قضاء أبي غريب) is a district in Baghdad Governorate, Iraq. Its hub is the city of Abu Ghraib. The population of the district was 189,000 as of 2003 100,000 people in the city of victory and peace and 89,000 people distributed to the rest of the judiciary.

== Cities ==
- Al Nasr Wal Salam
- Abu Ghraib
- Sadr al Yusufiyah
- Al Radwaniyah
