= Abu Ghraib (Botero series) =

Painting series by Fernando Botero

Abu Ghraib is a series of 131 paintings and 31 drawings, 162 artworks by Colombian artist Fernando Botero, created in 2004 and 2005. These artworks were inspired by the events that took place at the Abu Graib prison in late 2003 after the United States of America invaded Iraq. Botero used his distinctive style to represent the dehumanization that took place then. Botero's series is a collection of nearly one-hundred paintings and drawings, focused on the torture and suffering committed by the American soldiers on Iraqi prisoners that happened in this Iraqi prison.

== Background ==
=== Abu Ghraib scandal ===
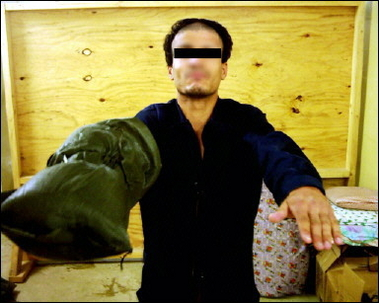
Abu Ghraib 33

Abu Ghraib was a prison in Iraq which become known for the acts of torture and violence that took place there during the Invasion of Iraq in 2003. Upon invading Iraq, the United States Military overtook the prison and then used it to house Iraqi prisoners during the war. By the end of the year 2003, through the press, the prison had become known throughout the world as a place of torture and dehumanization. In November, 2003 the first press release was published by the Associated Press revealing what was taking place in the prison.

At this time in Colombia, Botero first heard the news and saw the pictures of the horrific scenes which were leaked by a whistle-blower who had himself spent time in the prison. As Botero read the news daily, he was greatly astonished. Botero then decided to draw and paint those same scenes in his own style, allowing for the viewers to better understand the dehumanization that was occurring in the prison during the Iraq war.

=== Botero's response ===
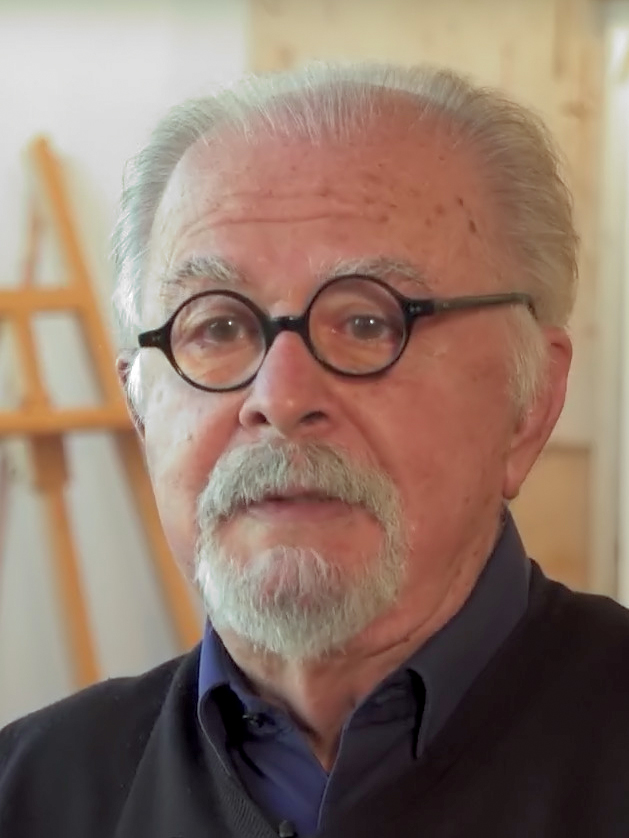
Fernando Botero (2018)

Botero explained himself when he saw the images of the torturous imprisonment: "I was... in shock like everyone else in the world was, the more I read about it". "Somehow I was more and more upset with the situation."

In its aftermath, Botero decided to created a painting series inspired by the event, and would took 14 months for that purpose. During this time, Botero drew and painted what he felt concerning the tragic events. His Abu Ghraib Series was made up of about 100 art pieces, both drawings and paintings.

Botero chose to focus his inspiration for the artworks on the news articles which were published about what the event. He refrained from referring to or using the famous photographic images published by the press and decided to seek inspiration solely from the written works.

When asked about his reason for including details and even adding his own ideas, Botero suggested, "Some people think that this is more dramatic than the photos, and perhaps it is true, because, when you paint, everything that is not necessary, you let out. You go to the essence of... the subject."

Upon publishing his artworks, Botero was thought by many to be condemning the United States Military for the mistreatment of the Iraqi prisoners. Botero plainly stated that his intent was simply to refute dehumanization and in no way was criticizing the United States. Botero always insisted that the Abu Ghraib series was not meant to be anti-american, rather a support to the Geneva Convention - which stands for humanitarian law.

"Anti-American it's not. Anti-brutality, anti-inhumanity, yes." Botero then continued to explain his stance on the matter, "I follow politics very closely. I read several newspapers every day. And I have a great admiration for this country. I'm sure the vast majority of people here don't approve of this. And the American press is the one that told the world this is going on. You have freedom of the press that makes such a thing possible". "Art is important," said Botero, "because when people start to forget, art reminds them what happened."

Botero believed that the significant importance of his paintings of Abu Ghraib was in bearing witness of the political events taking place. In 2006 after his completed series had been released, Botero stated, “I am not making [politically] committed art — art that aspires to change things.” He continued, “I do not believe in that because I know very well that art does not change anything.”

== The Artworks ==
=== Style and composition ===
As seen in his general body of work, the voluminous people make up the story of the events of the Abu Ghraib scandal.

He created 171 oil on canvas paintings. Many of the paintings show blood on the prisoner's faces and arms. One of his paintings depicts a human's foot with a tight rope tied around their ankle. In his 31 drawings, graphite and sanguine on paper, a naked man is seen hanging from his hands, tied together above his head. The man is falling perhaps due to fainting or pain. Although this drawing is done with graphite on paper, red marks of blood were added to the surrounding walls.

Botero used his style of inflated persons as the focus of this pieces of art. Hardly any weapons are shown in any of the paintings and drawings, instead, Botero quite largely represents the suffering of the inmates in a way that focuses solely on their facial expressions, grief, and discomfort.

== Reception ==
=== Public and critical responses ===
The media went in a frenzy with the public imagery of the scandal of Abu Ghraib. For many it even reminded them of 9-11 when the United States of America received a terrorist attack in New York City.

Daniel Rey wrote, in the Americas Quarterly: "Botero’s rounded forms stoke the viewer’s pathos because their tender composition contrasts so starkly with the scene’s brutality."

According to the Americas Quarterly article, "The Abu Ghraib series was an artistic departure for Botero. Whereas his characters usually have inscrutable faces, Botero gives the prisoners expressions of pain, anguish and humanity. What is more, he hides the torturers from view, granting the prisoners the dignity of being the paintings’ subjects."

Joseph Boone describes that the way he forms and paints the bodies enhances the ideas on the torture that was done in Iraq. In his book The Homoerotics of Orientalism he wrote, “Botero links the degradation of the prisoners to violations of their culture’s gender and sexual taboos; thus, in some tableaux, the prisoners are “feminized” by being forced to wear women’s undergarments glaringly unsuited to their oversized and hirsute bodies, and in others they are coerced into bodily contact suggestive of sexual acts.”

=== Exhibits ===
For two years after Botero's Aby Ghraib series was released, no North American museums offered to display it. Finally, in 2006 the Marlborough Gallery, in New York became the first venue to host the series. Later that year the University of California, in Berkeley, became the first exhibit of the series. Most of Botero's series is kept in the gallery in the University of California, as part of their Latin American Studies Program.
