= Salih Mahdi Ammash =

Iraqi historian, writer, author, poet and politician (1924–1985)

- صالح مهدي عماش

Vice President of Iraq
- In office April 1970 – December 1971 Serving with Saddam Hussein and Hardan al-Tikriti
- President: Ahmed Hassan al-Bakr
- Preceded by: Hardan al-Tikriti
- Succeeded by: Taha Muhie-eldin Marouf

Member of the Regional Command of the Iraqi Regional Branch
- In office 11 November 1963 – September 1971

Personal details
- Born: 1924 Baghdad, Kingdom of Iraq
- Died: 30 January 1985 (aged 60–61) Helsinki, Finland
- Party: Iraqi Regional Branch of the Arab Socialist Ba'ath Party
- Education: Baghdad Military College and Baghdad Staff College

Salih Mahdi Ammash (Arabic: صالح مهدي عماش; 1924 – 30 January 1985) was an Iraqi historian, writer, author, poet and Iraqi Regional Branch politician and Iraqi army officer who sat on the Regional Command from 1963 to 1971.

== Life ==
He was born into a peasant family in Baghdad, 1924. Ammash attended the Baghdad Military College and the Baghdad Staff College. He joined the Ba'ath Party in 1952 and become one of the first military Ba'athists in the Iraqi Regional Branch. Ammash was a member of the Free Officers Movement which toppled the Iraqi monarchy.

Ammash was elected to the Regional Command for three separate terms. He also served as one of the vice presidents of Ahmed Hassan al-Bakr.

In 1975, Ammash became the first ambassador of Iraq to Finland. In January 1985, while still in Helsinki, he suddenly became ill and died of natural causes, there was a theory that he was poisoned on the orders of Iraqi leader Saddam Hussein. But this accusation is poorly backed-up, and there is no proof Saddam Hussein had ever ordered it, and the average life expectancy in Iraq in 1985 was 60 years old, which was the age Ammash passed at, so it is most likely he died of natural causes. In Finland, Ammash invited the notorious neo-Nazi Pekka Siitoin to the Iraqi embassy on one occasion due to shared antisemitic views.

His daughter Huda became the first and only female member of the Regional Command on 18 May 2001.

== Sources ==
- Devlin, John (1975). The Baath Party: a History from its Origins to 1966 (2nd ed.). Hoover Institute Press. ISBN 978-0-8179-6561-7.
- Ghareeb, Edmund A.; Dougherty, Beth K. (2004). Historical Dictionary of Iraq. Lanham, Md: Scarecrow Press. ISBN 978-0-8108-4330-1.
- Pohjola, Mike, ed. (2015). Mitä Pekka Siitoin tarkoittaa?. Savukeidas. ISBN 978-952-268-155-3.
