= Adnan al-Hamdani =

Iraqi politician

Adnan al-Hamdani (died 1979) was an Iraqi official. He was appointed as the Minister of Planning in late 1975, and as the Deputy Prime Minister five days before his execution in 1979 as part of the 1979 Ba'ath Party Purge. He was reportedly shot dead by Barzan al-Tikriti.
