= Saadoun Ghaidan =

Iraqi politician (1930–1985)

Saadoun Ghaidan (born in Baghdad in 1930, died in 1985) is an Iraqi politician and military with the rank of Major General and was a member of the Arab Socialist Ba'ath Party, a member of the Revolutionary Command Council and held various ministerial positions in the Iraqi government, such as the Minister of Interior and Minister of Transportation.

== Career ==
He was a commander of the Tanks Brigade in the Republican Palace, who sent down his tanks and took control of the palace and the radio during the July 1968 coup. He joined the Revolutionary Command Council since the July 17, 1968 revolution for his main role in it, then became vice president of the Revolutionary Command Council when Saddam Hussein assumed the position of president on July 16, 1979. He held the position of Minister of Interior from April 1970 until November 11 1974. On June 30, 1973, he was wounded during an attempt by Nadhim Kzar to overthrow the government, and the Minister of Defense, Hammad Shihab, was killed. On November 11, 1974, he held the position of Minister of Transportation, then Minister of Transport and Communications, starting in May 1978 after the merger of the two ministries. On July 16, 1979, when Saddam Hussein assumed the presidency, he held the position of Deputy Prime Minister while continuing to hold the position of Minister of Transport and Communications. He was removed from his post on 27 June 1982, and died in 1985.
