= Salah Omar al-Ali =

Iraqi politician (1938–2024)

- صلاح عمر العلي

Member of the Regional Command of the Iraqi Regional Branch
- In office October 1966 – 1970

Minister of Culture and Information
- In office 1968–1970

Iraqi Ambassador to the United Nations
- In office 1978–1981
- Succeeded by: Ismat T. Kittani

Iraqi Ambassador to Spain
- In office 1976–1978

Iraqi Ambassador to Sweden
- In office 1973–1976

Personal details
- Born: 17 July 1938 Tikrit, Iraq
- Died: 27 May 2024 (aged 85) Istanbul, Turkey
- Party: Iraqi Regional Branch of the Arab Socialist Ba'ath Party

Salah Omar al-Ali (17 July 1938 – 27 May 2024) was a member of the Iraqi Revolutionary Command Council, Iraqi Minister of Culture and Information from 1968 to 1970, and subsequently ambassador to Sweden, Spain and the United Nations from 1973 to 1981. He was a leading member of the Iraqi opposition.

He was formerly a leading member of the Ba'ath Party, and was therefore very close to individuals such as Saddam Hussein who were subsequently accused of having committed a number of atrocities. Al-Ali was popular in Iraq, he resigned twice from high ranking governmental positions in protest.

== Early years ==
Al-Ali was born in Salah ad Din Governorate, in a village near the city of Tikrit. His father, Omar, was a small landowner who was involved in agricultural production. Al-Ali eventually migrated to Baghdad where he attended law school and became active in politics. At the time, the two major political parties that were popular amongst Iraqi youth were the Iraqi Communist Party and the Ba'ath Party, both of which expounded leftist principles relating to the redistribution of wealth and the eradication of the old social classes that dominated Iraqi society at the time, and both of which were violently opposed to the British. In that context, Al-Ali joined the Ba'ath party. His activism generated a certain amount of hostility from the government. As noted in a 2026 publication by the Lebanese author Suleiman Ferzoli: "Salah Omar Al-Ali joined the Ba'ath Party in the late 1950s, around the same time that Saddam Hussein joined it. He became one of the most prominent leaders of the second generation of Iraqi Ba'athists. Because he was an eloquent interlocutor, genuinely open to other political currents and willing to cooperate with them, he quickly rose to prominence both within and outside the party. Michel Aflaq drew him close and regarded him as one of his trusted associates."

== Years in government ==
By 1968, Al-Ali was a leading member of the Ba'ath Party. When the Ba'ath seized power in the July Revolution of 1968, Al-Ali was appointed to the Iraqi Revolution Command Council (the "RCC"), a group of six leading Baath party officials who held joint executive authority over the entire country. Each member of the RCC also held governmental posts; Al-Ali was appointed Minister of Culture and Information. As such, Al-Ali was responsible for cultural affairs and for managing the government's official information campaign.

== Exile in Lebanon ==
A number of differences emerged between Al-Ali and the rest of his ministerial colleagues, in 1970, Al-Ali resigned from his governmental positions as a result of these differences, and was sent into exile to Egypt. Al-Ali remained in Egypt for some time and eventually moved to Lebanon, where he remained until 1973.

== Years in diplomacy ==
In 1972 and 1973, two major events greatly affected Iraq's geopolitical position. Firstly, in 1972, the Ba'athist government decided to put an end to British interests in Iraq's oil industry and nationalised all oil interests owned by British companies throughout the country. Secondly, the 1973 oil crisis caused the price of oil to quadruple in international markets overnight. The combination of these two events greatly reinforced the position of the Ba'ath, which was then able to invest vast amounts of capital into Iraq's economy and into its military.

At that point the Iraqi government, confident of its position, invited a number of dissidents to return to Iraq. Al-Ali returned to Baghdad after he was promised safe passage. Shortly after his arrival he was offered the position of Ambassador to Sweden, which he initially refused but was soon appointed as Ambassador to Sweden, where he served from 1973 to 1976. He subsequently was Ambassador to Spain from 1976 to 1978, and was then appointed as Permanent Representative to the United Nations in New York, where he served from 1978 to 1981.

== Years in opposition ==
Saddam Hussein assumed the presidency in 1979, and later that year attended the Conference of the Non-Aligned Movement in Cuba, which Al-Ali also attended and met with representatives from the new Islamic Republic of Iran. Al-Ali later recalled that he initially viewed the discussions as a promising opportunity to avoid an impending conflict with Iran. However, following a private conversation with Saddam after the meeting, it became clear to Al-Ali that the Iraqi leader was simply using the talks as a tactical exercise, and had no intention in pursuing a diplomatic settlement. According to Al-Ali, Saddam believed Iran's post-revolutionary weakness presented Iraq with a rare opportunity to reclaim the disputed Shatt-al-arab river.

A few months after the Iran–Iraq War commenced, Al-Ali resigned his position once again. As a result of this decision, Al-Ali was banned from returning to his home country, and was only able to return to Iraq after the 2003 Invasion of Iraq.

After the 1991 Gulf War, Al-Ali decided to formally join the Iraqi opposition, and with Iyad Allawi formed the short-lived Al-Wifaq party. He began publishing a weekly political newspaper from London that adopted an anti-Saddam and staunchly patriotic line. The paper rejected any foreign influence in the country and was fiercely opposed to the international sanctions that had been imposed against Iraq by the international community.

== Return to Iraq ==
As the war commenced in March 2003, Al-Ali was interviewed on a number of occasions on Al-Jazeera in which he condemned both the US-led invasion and Saddam Hussein's government. As the Iraqi government began to fall, Al-Ali entered the country through the Syrian-Iraqi border and this event was captured on an Al-Arabiya documentary that was aired shortly after the war.

In 2003 Al-Ali lived in Baghdad for some months, where he published his weekly newspaper, which adopted an anti-occupation and opposition stance. He stopped publication of his weekly newspaper after some months to settle abroad.

== Death ==
Al-Ali died in Istanbul on 27 May 2024, at the age of 86.
