= Abu Ghraib =

City in the Baghdad Governorate, Iraq

Abu Ghraib أبو غريب
- Town
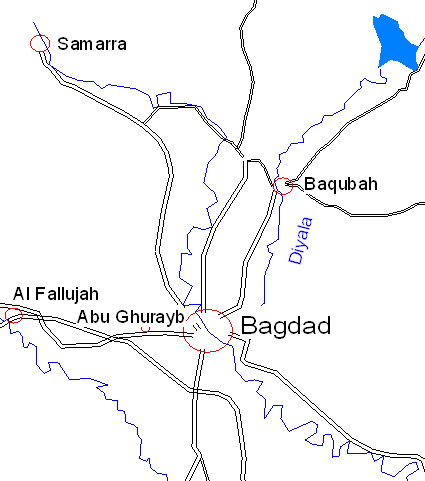
- Map showing Abu Ghraib near Baghdad

- Abu Ghraib location inside Iraq
- Coordinates: 33°17′31″N 44°3′56″E
- Country: Iraq
- Governorate: Baghdad Governorate

Population (2025)
  - Total: 900,000

Abu Ghraib (/ˈɑːbuː ˈɡrɛb/ or /ˈɡreɪb/; Arabic: أبو غريب, romanized: Abū Ghurayb) is a city in the Baghdad Governorate of Iraq, located just west of Baghdad's city center, or northwest of Baghdad International Airport. It has a population of 900,000 (2025). The old road to Jordan passes through Abu Ghraib. The government of Iraq created the city and Abu Ghraib District in 1944.

The placename has been translated as "father of little crows" (in the sense of "place abundant in small crows"), but this translation has been suspected of being a folk etymology, and the name may be related to gharb ("west"), or ghariib ("strange, foreign") instead.

Abu Ghraib was known for the Abu Ghraib Infant Formula Plant, which Western intelligence agencies perennially claimed to be a biological weapons production facility. The plant was built in 1980 and painted with a dappled camouflage pattern during the Iran–Iraq War. It was bombed during the Gulf War, and the Iraqi government allowed CNN reporter Peter Arnett to film the destroyed building along with a conspicuous hand-painted sign that read, "baby milk factory". Iraq partially rebuilt the facility afterward, and US Secretary of State Colin Powell falsely cited it again as a weapons production plant in the run-up to the Iraq War, even though the CIA's own investigation had concluded that the site had been bombed "in the mistaken belief that it was a key BW [Biological Weapon] facility." Also, an examination of suspected weapons facilities by the Iraq Survey Group later determined that the plant, in disuse for some time, housed discarded infant formula, but found no evidence of weapons production.

The city is also the site of Abu Ghraib prison, which was one of the sites where political dissidents were incarcerated under former ruler Saddam Hussein. Thousands of these dissidents were tortured and executed. After Saddam Hussein's fall, the Abu Ghraib prison was used by American forces in Iraq. In 2003, Abu Ghraib prison earned international notoriety for the torture and abuses by members of the United States Army during the post-invasion period.
