= Hammad Shehab =

Hammad Shihab (died 1973) was an Iraqi official. A general, he also served as the defense minister. He was assassinated in 1973.

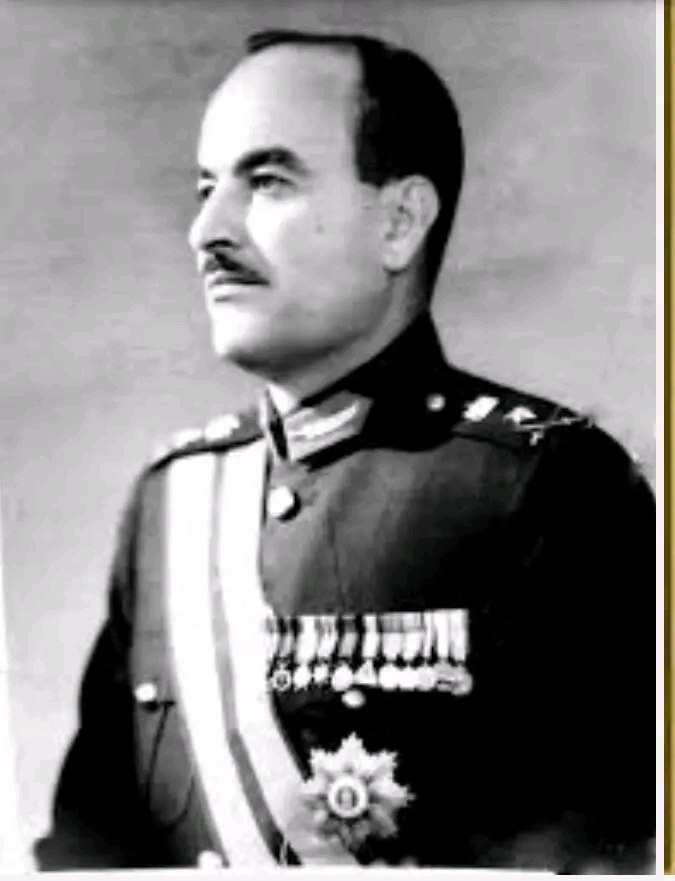
