= Ahmed Hassan al-Bakr =

President of Iraq from 1968 to 1979

Field Marshal Ahmed Hassan al-Bakr
- أَحْمَد حَسَن الْبَكْر
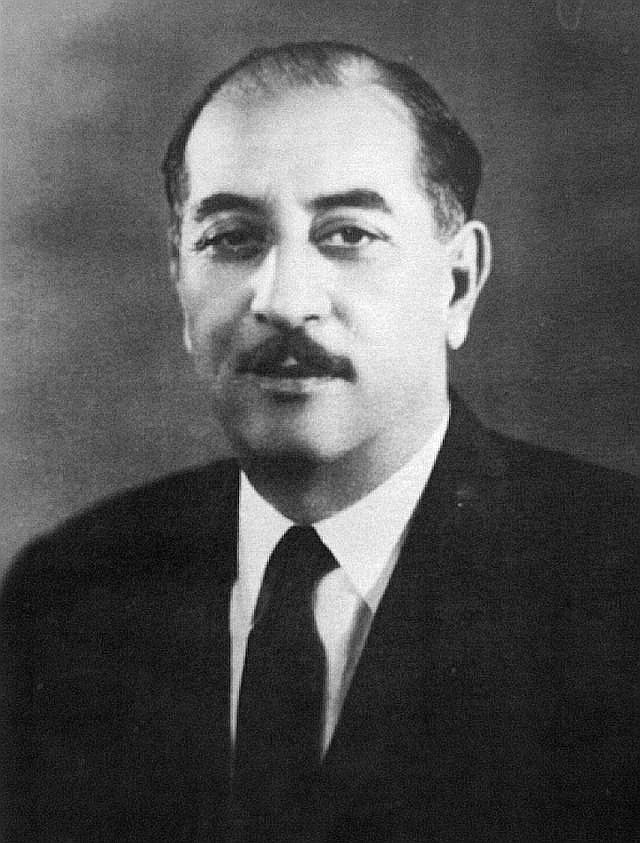
- Official portrait, c. 1974

4th President of Iraq
- In office 17 July 1968 – 16 July 1979
- Prime Minister: Abd ar-Razzaq an-Naif; Himself
- Vice President: Saddam Hussein
- Preceded by: Abdul Rahman Arif
- Succeeded by: Saddam Hussein

Prime Minister of Iraq
- In office 31 July 1968 – 16 July 1979
- President: Himself
- Preceded by: Abd ar-Razzaq an-Naif
- Succeeded by: Saddam Hussein
- In office 8 February 1963 – 18 November 1963
- President: Abdul Salam Arif
- Deputy: Ali Salih al-Sa'di
- Preceded by: Abdul-Karim Qasim
- Succeeded by: Tahir Yahya

Minister of Defence
- In office 11 November 1974 – 15 October 1977
- Prime Minister: Himself
- Preceded by: Hammad Shihab (died in office); Abdullah al-Khadduri (acting from July 1973)
- Succeeded by: Adnan Khayr Allah

1st Chairman of the Revolutionary Command Council
- In office 17 July 1968 – 16 July 1979
- Deputy: Saddam Hussein
- Preceded by: Post established
- Succeeded by: Saddam Hussein

Regional Secretary of the Regional Command of the Iraqi Regional Branch
- In office October 1966 – 16 July 1979
- National Secretary: Michel Aflaq
- Preceded by: Saddam Hussein
- Succeeded by: Saddam Hussein
- In office 11 November 1963 – February 1964
- Preceded by: Hamdi Abd al-Majid
- Succeeded by: Saddam Hussein

Member of the Regional Command of the Iraqi Regional Branch
- In office 11 November 1963 – 16 July 1979

Vice-President of Iraq
- In office 18 November 1963 – 4 January 1964
- Preceded by: Office established
- Succeeded by: Office abolished

Personal details
- Born: 1 July 1914 Tikrit, Ottoman Iraq
- Died: 4 October 1982 (aged 68) Baghdad, Ba'athist Iraq
- Party: Arab Socialist Ba'ath (1940s–1966); Baghdad-based Ba'ath (1966–1982) (NPF)
- Spouse: Ghaida al-Nada
- Children: 3, including Abd al-Salam
- Relatives: Adnan Khairallah (son-in-law); Lo'uay Khairallah (son-in-law)
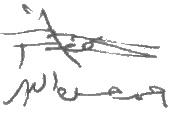
- Signature

Military service
- Allegiance: Iraq
- Branch/service: Iraqi Army
- Years of service: 1938–1982
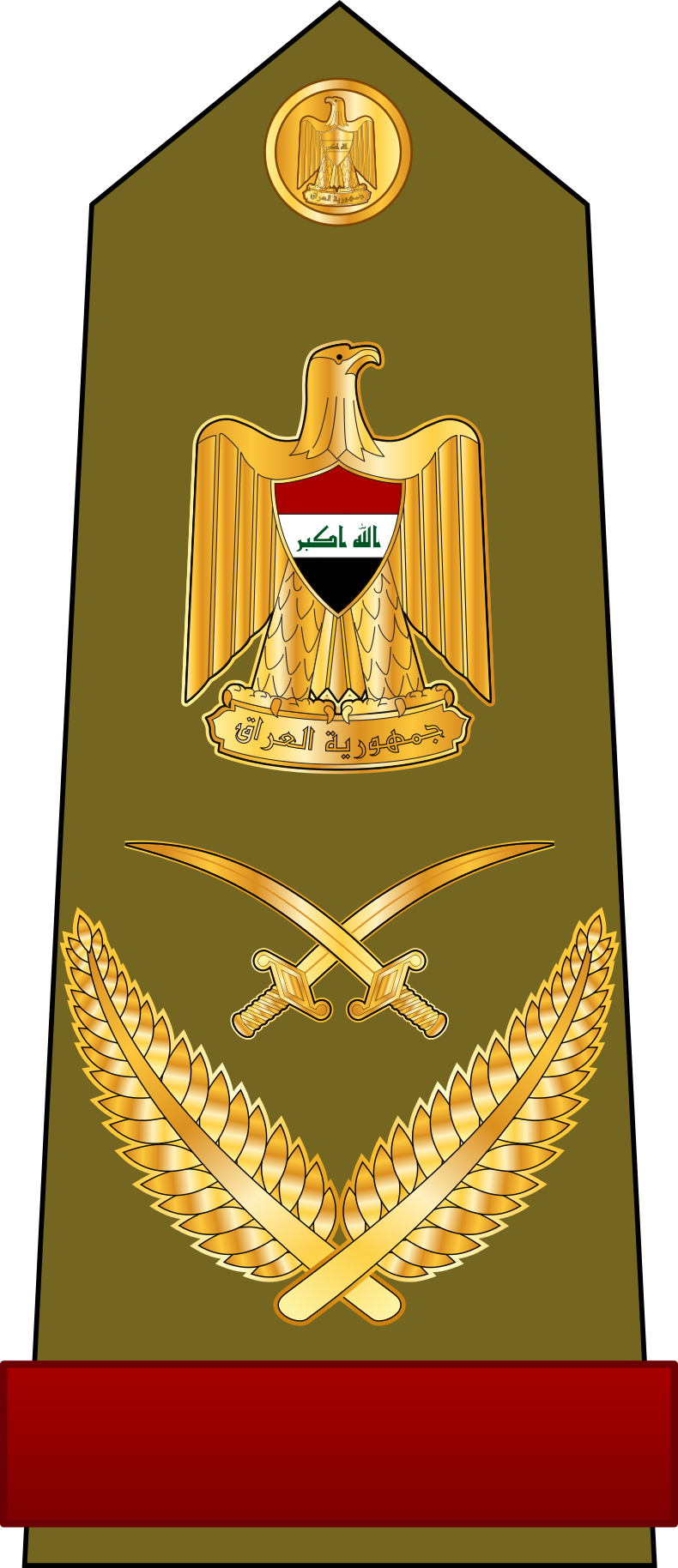
- Rank: Field Marshal
- Battles/wars: Second World War; Middle Eastern theatre; Anglo-Iraqi War; Ramadan Revolution; 17 July Revolution

Ahmed Hassan al-Bakr (Note: Arabic: أَحْمَد حَسَن الْبَكْر 'Aḥmad Ḥasan al-Bakr) (1 July 1914 – 4 October 1982) was an Iraqi military officer and politician who served as the fourth president of Iraq from 1968 to 1979. He was a leading member of the revolutionary Arab Socialist Ba'ath Party and later the Baghdad-based Ba'ath Party and its regional organisation Ba'ath Party – Iraq Region (the Ba'ath Party's Iraqi branch), which espoused Ba'athism, a mix of Arab nationalism and Arab socialism.

Al-Bakr first rose to prominence after the 14 July Revolution, which overthrew the monarchy. In the newly established government, he was involved in improving Iraqi–Soviet relations. In 1959 al-Bakr was forced to resign from the Iraqi military; the then Iraqi government accused him of anti-government activities. Following his forced retirement, he became the chairman of the Ba'ath Party's Iraqi branch's Military Bureau. Through this office he recruited members to the Ba'athist cause through patronage and cronyism. Prime Minister Abd al-Karim Qasim was overthrown in the Ramadan Revolution (8 February); al-Bakr was appointed prime minister, and later, Vice President of Iraq in a Ba'ath-Nasserist coalition government. The government lasted for less than a year, and was ousted in November 1963.

Al-Bakr and the party then pursued underground activities and became vocal critics of the government. During this period, al-Bakr was elected the Ba'ath Party's Iraqi branch's Secretary General (the head), and appointed his cousin, Saddam Hussein, the party cell's deputy leader. Al-Bakr and the Ba'ath Party regained power in the coup of 1968, later called the 17 July Revolution. In the coup's aftermath, he was elected the chairman of the Revolutionary Command Council and the president; he was later appointed the prime minister. Saddam, the Ba'ath Party's deputy, became the deputy chairman of the Revolutionary Command Council and vice president, and was responsible for Iraq's security services.

Under al-Bakr's rule, Iraq grew economically due to high international oil prices, which strengthened its position in the Arab world and increased Iraqis' standard of living. Land reforms were introduced, and wealth was distributed more equally. A sort of socialist economy was established in the late 1970s under Saddam's direction. Al-Bakr gradually lost power to Saddam in the 1970s, as the latter strengthened his position within the party and the state through security services. In 1979, al-Bakr resigned from all public offices for "health reasons". He died in 1982 of unreported causes.

== Early life and career ==
Al-Bakr was born 1 July 1914 in Tikrit, Ottoman Iraq. He belonged to the Abu Bakr clan of the al-Bejat branch of the Al-Bu Nasir tribe. His father Hassan Bakr Omar died in 1938. That same year he entered the Iraqi Military Academy after spending six years as a primary-school teacher. During his early military career, he took part in the Rashid Ali al-Gaylani's failed revolt against the British in 1941, and was imprisoned and expelled from the army. After 15 years of trying to rehabilitate himself al-Bakr was reinstated in the Iraqi Army in 1956, the same year he became a member of the Arab Socialist Ba'ath Party's Iraqi branch. In 1957, he was promoted to brigadier. Around this time al-Bakr got into contact with the Free Officers and Civilians Movement. He helped bring down the Hashemite Monarchy and bring Abd al-Karim Qasim to power during the 14 July Revolution. He had a short stint in the public limelight during Qasim's rule, and withdrew Iraq from the Baghdad Pact and was a key player in improving Iraq's bilateral relations with the Soviet Union. In 1959, a year following the coup, al-Bakr was again forced to retire from the military under allegations that he led an anti-government rebellion in Mosul by officers who favoured closer ties with the United Arab Republic. During this period he became a member of the Ba'ath Party. Even so, al-Bakr retained his prominence within the Arab Socialist Ba'ath Party's Iraqi branch.

In the late 1950s, when Saddam became a member of the Ba'ath Party, the two established a bond. Their future close relationship became possible because of Saddam's uncle, Khairallah Talfah. At the very beginning, Saddam was only a Ba'ath Party member, not a party activist.

Because of Qasim's government's repressive policy towards the opposition, Ali Salih al-Sa'di, Secretary (leader) of the Arab Socialist Ba'ath Party's Iraqi branch, reorganised the party's rank and file, and on 24 December 1962 launched a nationwide protest against Qasim's government. The government's treatment of dissent did not soften and by 1963 several leading Iraqi Ba'athists had travelled to Beirut to plan a coup against Qasim. The plan was simple: to build a support network in the military. A Military Bureau was established to set these plans in motion. Al-Bakr was elected its chairman. The bureau managed to recruit increasing numbers of officers, most often through personal attachments to certain people; for instance, some officers attached themselves to the bureau because of their relationship with al-Bakr. Al-Bakr led the February 1963 Iraqi coup d'état, later called the Ramadan Revolution, and overthrew Qasim's government.

== On the road to power ==
=== Prime Ministership: 1963 ===
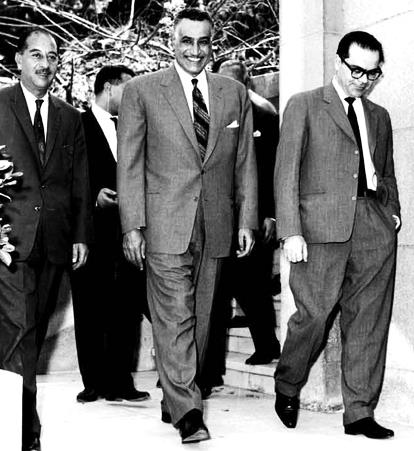
Tripartite unity talks between Iraqi Prime Minister al-Bakr (left), Egyptian President Gamal Abdel Nasser (center) and Syrian President Lu'ay al-Atassi (right), 16 April 1963

In the coup's aftermath, Abdul Salam Arif, an independent, was installed as president, al-Bakr was installed as prime minister and vice president, al-Sadi was chosen as deputy prime minister, and Minister of Interior and Tahir Yahya was chosen as chief of staff. Soon after taking power, two factions were established; the radicals, mostly military men, who wished for socialist policies, and the moderates, led by Talib El-Shibib, who wanted to broaden the government's traditional base of support by including non-Ba'athists in government. Al-Bakr was a moderate and spent much of his time trying to seek a compromise between the two factions.

To solve the ideological differences between the party factions, al-Bakr called a meeting of the National Command, the leading organ of the Ba'ath Party. The meeting did not go as al-Bakr planned, and Michel Aflaq, the Secretary General of the National Command (the Ba'ath Party leader), suggested that the National Command should take over the Iraqi Ba'ath Party cell. The meeting led Arif, the President, to lead the November 1963 Iraqi coup d'état.

=== Underground and the 17 July Revolution: 1964–1968 ===
Following his and the party's ouster, al-Bakr was jailed. The November coup had the effect of strengthening al-Bakr's position within the party as well as that of his close associates. After a couple of years, al-Bakr was elected as the Iraqi branch's Secretary General of the Regional Command. Simultaneously with al-Bakr's rise to power, Saddam's position within the party also strengthened. During this time period, Saddam became one of al-Bakr's closest associates, and he was trusted with important tasks. Saddam was tasked with establishing the party's security apparatus. Al-Bakr consolidated his hold on the Ba'ath Party's Iraqi branch by appointing supporters to important offices. By appointing fellow Tikritis and by appointing family members to top offices, al-Bakr was ensuing a policy of nepotism.

Ali Salih al-Sa'di, the Secretary General of the Iraqi branch's Regional Command, was expelled from the party in 1964, and al-Bakr succeeded him in office. The remaining members of the Military Bureau were given high offices within the Regional Command. The Ba'ath Party tried unsuccessfully to oust the Arif government in 1964. In the failed coup's aftermath, both al-Bakr and Saddam, were sentenced to jail for two years. In 1966, when Saddam was released from prison, al-Bakr appointed him Deputy Secretary of the Regional Command. Saddam, who would prove to be a skilled organiser, revitalised the party. In 1967, al-Bakr called for the establishment of a national unity government between ba'athist and nasserist forces. Al-Bakr's call for a unity government should be taken with a grain of salt; by this time the Military Bureau and the Regional Command were already planning a coup to oust the government.

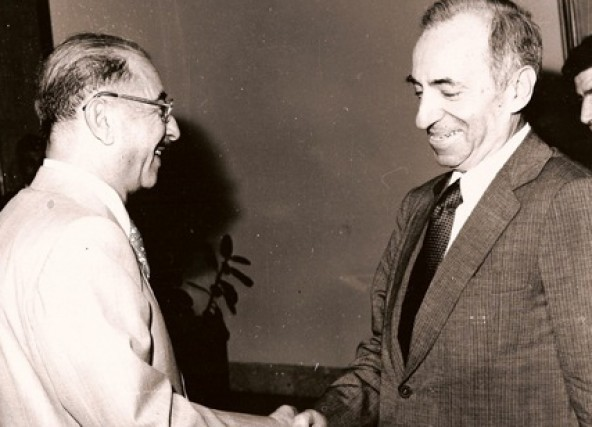
al-Bakr (left) shaking hands with Michel Aflaq, the founder of ba'athist thought, in 1968

Following the 1966 Syrian coup d'état against the leadership of Michel Aflaq, the Arab Socialist Ba'ath Party split in two; a Damascus-based (Syrian-led) Ba'ath Party and a Baghdad-based (Iraqi-led) Ba'ath Party. In February 1968, the Iraqi-led Ba'ath Party convened the Ninth National Congress and elected Aflaq as the Secretary General of the National Command of the Iraqi-led Ba'ath Party. This decision worsened the already bad relations with the Syrian-led Ba'ath Party. Al-Bakr was elected to the National Command as a member at the Ninth National Congress.

The coup of 1968, later referred to as the 17 July Revolution, brought al-Bakr and the Arab Socialist Ba'ath Party to power in Iraq. Saddam and Salah Omar al-Ali led the coup on the ground, but it was al-Bakr who masterminded it. From his military headquarters, al-Bakr contacted Abdul Rahman Arif, the President, and asked him to surrender. Arif asked for time to consider; he wanted to find out if he had any loyal troops left. He phoned al-Bakr back later that evening and surrendered. Al-Bakr, in return, guaranteed his safety. Later, when the situation was secure, the Ba'ath Party announced it had taken power. Before taking power, the Arab Socialist Ba'ath Party tried successfully to recruit military officers for the cause; some, such as Hardan al-Tikriti were already Ba'ath Party members, others, such as Abd ar-Razzaq an-Naif, the deputy head of the military intelligence and Ibrahim Daud, the commander of the Republican Guard, were not members.

Immediately after the coup, a power struggle broke out between Arab Socialist Ba'ath Party led by al-Bakr and the military wing, led predominantly by an-Naif and Daud. an-Naif and Daud had been appointed prime minister and Minister of Defence respectively, while al-Bakr was appointed president and chairman of the Revolutionary Command Council, which had been established the morning after the coup and had become the highest executive and legislative branch of government. While an-Naif and Daud, according to Con Coughlin, should have had the upper hand because of their support within the military, they lost the power struggle to al-Bakr due to his political skills and the Arab Socialist Ba'ath Party's organisational structure. An-Naif was removed from office on 30 July 1968, and Daud lost his position shortly after. They were both exiled. Their removal was later referred to by the government as the "correctional coup". Al-Bakr consolidated his position in government by appointing himself prime minister and by appointing his close associate, Hardan al-Tikriti, as Minister of Defence in the aftermath of the "corrective coup".

== Presidency: 1968–1979 ==
=== Economics ===
==== Economic system ====
Despite al-Bakr's and the Iraqi-led Ba'ath Party's radical rhetoric, their economic policies were neither radical nor very socialist. Al-Bakr's policy can be divided into two parts: the first being a largely populist economic policy, and the second, an economic policy based on cronyism, patronage and nepotism. By the late-1970s, Saddam had de facto control over Iraq's economic development by being chairman of the most important economic committees. A shift happened under Saddam's command; a socialist economy, according to Con Coughlin, with government ownership of natural resources and the means of production was established. Saddam also started a diversification programme to ensure that Iraq would not be dependent on its oil revenues in the future. Even before the Ba'ath takeover, the Iraqi government set economic growth targets through economic planning. The Revolutionary Command Council (RCC), the highest legislative and executive organ of party and state, implemented and decided the goals of the plan. It was the political elite, and not the economic elite, which decided the content of an economic plan; before the Ba'ath took power, it was the other way around. The RCC convened every year to set up a budget for each year to come.

==== Agricultural policy ====
From the very beginning, al-Bakr's handling of Iraqi agriculture was handled with a populist touch. For instance, in 1969 the government cancelled all compensation for sequestered lands. This decree relieved the beneficiaries of the reform by removing the financial burden. Investments in agriculture increased, and by May 1970 the government had introduced a new land reform. This land reform tried to revitalise Iraqi agriculture by resolving some of the issues of the previous land reforms, such as by paying more attention to the relationship to the type of land and irrigation system, and limits on how much land could be owned. Co-operatives were established, and cultivators were obliged to join them if they wanted to benefit from government subsidies and investments. At around this time, the government also established several collective farms to placate the party's left-wing faction; the establishment of collective farms soon halted. Other measures were also introduced which benefited the landholding peasants, but these reforms were never able to counter the decline in agricultural production. Because of this, and the high population growth at the time, Iraq became a net importer of food grains; imports of food grain increased twelvefold from the early 1960s.

The introduction of subsidies and the removal of financial burdens from the peasantry were populist, but were also part of al-Bakr's plan of creating a patrimonial system with himself at the top. This system gave the economic levers of powers to the political elite, which it used to confiscate the properties of its political opponents. The continued sequestration of land increased the strength of the patrimonial system; members of the political elite could bestow lands to people to increase the support for the government. The government could do this because the government was Iraq's biggest landowner. The co-operatives which had been established provided a means of social control through their regulation. Corruption also proved to be a problem, and the acquisition of land of people close to the political leadership was repeated on a scale not seen since the time of the monarchy. This patrimonial system also favoured those who already owned land; roughly one-third of agricultural land was owned by the estimated 3 percent of landowners. Instead of confiscating their property, and evening out the distribution of land, the government kept the system in place.

By the mid-to-late 1970s, the Arab Socialist Ba'ath Party's land reform was beginning to have an effect. By 1976, 71 percent of state-owned land was given 222,000 new farmers. These farmers were also given up-to-date agricultural equipment. Co-operatives increased from a low 473 in 1968 to 1,852 in 1976.

==== Oil industry ====
The government, which was still embroiled in a conflict with the Iraqi Petroleum Company (IPC), a private enterprise, on Law 80 of 1961. Iraq was later able to negotiate a treaty with the Soviet Union, whereby the later built an oil pipeline to an oil refinery and oil export facility at al-Faw, in the Persian Gulf, to improve Iraq's oil producing capabilities. This agreement would signal the end of the IPC's dominance over Iraq's oil resources; it also reinforced al-Bakr's belief that the company needed to be nationalised. Negotiations between the Iraqi government and the IPC began in December 1971 and ended in March 1972 when the government was given shares in the IPC's equity. However, relations soon soured; the IPC cut its own production at the Kirkuk Field by half. The government saw this as proof of the company's arrogance, and the government also began to see the danger of a private company controlling such a vital source of the government's revenues. The IPC was nationalised in June 1972.

The nationalisation of the IPC proved to be the last important element of foreign control over Iraq's control, and Iraq as a whole. Austerity measures were introduced in anticipation of the loss of revenue. Even so, the nationalisation proved highly popular with the people. In addition, al-Bakr and Saddam had taken steps to make the anticipated loss less severe on the people and the economy; Saddam visited Moscow and negotiated a treaty whereby the Soviet Union would buy some of Iraq's oil, and second, the government did not nationalise the IPC subsidiaries and gave French members "special treatment". These French members bought nearly a quarter of Iraq's oil production. This policy proved highly successful, and there was a massive increase in the price of oil in the aftermath of the 1973 Arab–Israeli War. The oil revenues strengthened the political elite's patrimonial system; the means of patronage exceeded "anything available" to previous rulers.

Following the nationalisation of the IPC, Iraq's oil revenue increased from 219 million ID in 1972 1.7 billion ID in 1974 to 3.7 billion ID in 1978 to 8.9 billion ID in 1980. In short, Iraq increased its oil revenue by over 40 times in less than a decade. With the success of the Iranian revolution, Iraq became the second largest oil exporter in the world. The increase in oil export rejuvenated the country's economy; nearly all economic indexes increased to unprecedented levels. From 1970 to 1980 Iraq's economy grew by 11.7 percent. The growth rates of the 1970s were not sustainable; economic growth depended on high oil prices and Iraq's oil exporting capabilities, and once oil was cut out of the picture, Iraq's growth would decrease dramatically.

==== Standard of living ====
On taking power, the Arab Socialist Ba'ath Party promised wealth distribution and a more equal society; the government's effort to implement this was hampered by the government's lack of revenue. The government was able to fulfill this promise with the increase in oil revenues in the 1970s. Immediately after taking power, Al-Bakr introduced subsidies on basic commodities, and introduced tax relief and a limited social welfare programme. These programmes were not properly developed until the mid-1970s, when increasing oil revenue allowed the government to invest more in such areas. According to Con Coughlin, the author of Saddam: His Rise and Fall, one of the Ba'ath Party's main goals was the elimination of both the Iraqi upper and middle classes. The standard of living increased due to the nationalisation of the IPC. The country's electricity grid was expanded, and for the first time in Iraq's history, it reached the countryside.

=== Domestic policy ===
==== The Kurds ====
Under Bakr conflicts intensified between the government and the Kurds. In early 1974 heavy fighting erupted in northern Iraq between government forces and Kurdish nationalists, who rejected as inadequate a new Kurdish autonomy law based on a 1970 agreement. The Kurds, led by Mustafa Barzani, received arms and support from Iran. Around this same time he founded the National Progressive Front in an effort to broaden the support base for his government.

==== Repression ====
In July 1978 a decree was passed which made all non-Ba'thist political activity illegal and membership of any other political party punishable by death for all those who were members or former members of the Armed Forces.

=== Foreign policy ===
His government initially supported closer ties with Nasser, and under his rule Iraq almost joined the United Arab Republic. The flag of Iraq was modified in preparation for this goal. However, the relationship with Nasser eventually deteriorated.

Bakr's government also strengthened Iraq's ties with the Soviet Union. On 9 April 1972, Iraq and the Soviet Union signed a treaty of friendship. The two countries agreed to cooperate in political, economic, and military affairs. The Soviet Union also agreed to supply Iraq with arms.

According to historian Charles R. H. Tripp, the Ba'athist coup of 1968 upset "the US-sponsored security system established as part of the Cold War in the Middle East. It appeared that any enemy of the Baghdad government was a potential ally of the United States." From 1973 to 1975, the Central Intelligence Agency colluded with Shah Mohammad Reza Pahlavi of Iran to finance and arm Kurdish rebels in the Second Iraqi–Kurdish War in an attempt to weaken al-Bakr. When Iran and Iraq signed the Algiers Agreement in 1975, the support ceased.

== Death ==
Al-Bakr died in October 1982 of unreported causes. He was given a state funeral, attended by Michel Aflaq (father of the Ba'athist ideology), who was reported to have led his funeral procession, and King Hussein of Jordan. He was buried in Baghdad's al-Karkh cemetery.

== See also ==
- List of presidents of Iraq

== Notes ==
Political offices
Preceded by Abd al-Karim Qasim	Prime Minister of Iraq; 1963	Succeeded by Tahir Yahya
Preceded by Office created	Vice President of Iraq; 1963–1964	Succeeded by Saddam Hussein
Preceded by Abd ar-Razzaq an-Naif	Prime Minister of Iraq; 1968–1979	Succeeded by Saddam Hussein
Preceded by Abd ar-Rahman Arif	President of Iraq; 1968–1979	Succeeded by Saddam Hussein
Preceded by Office created	Chairman of the Revolutionary Command Council; 1968–1979	Succeeded by Saddam Hussein
