= Revolutionary Command Council (Iraq) =

Governing body in Ba'athist Iraq

- مجلس قيادة الثورة; Majlis al-Qiyadah al-Thawrah
- Seal of the Revolutionary Command Council

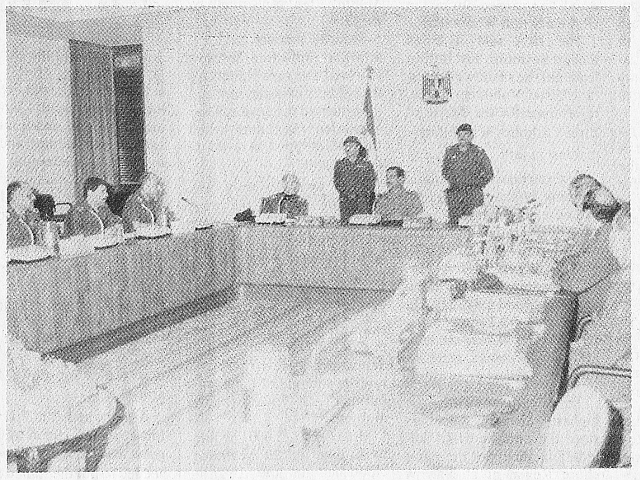
- A session of the Revolutionary Command Council. Saddam Hussein can be seen seated at the end of the table, in the middle.

Government overview
- Formed: 17 July 1968
- Dissolved: 9 April 2003
- Jurisdiction: Ba'athist Iraq
- Headquarters: Baghdad
- Government executives: Ahmed Hassan al-Bakr, First Chairman; Saddam Hussein, Last Chairman

The Revolutionary Command Council (Arabic: مجلس قيادة الثورة- قطر العراق) was the supreme legislative and executive body in Ba'athist Iraq. Established after the 1968 Iraqi coup, it consists of several high-ranking members of the at the time ruling Ba'ath Party headed by a chairman and vice chairman, whom are appointed via approval from two-thirds of the council. The chairman also held the position of the President of Iraq and was allowed to select a Vice President.

After Saddam Hussein became President of Iraq in 1979, the council was led by deputy chairman Izzat Ibrahim ad-Douri, deputy Prime Minister Tariq Aziz, and Taha Yassin Ramadan, who had known Saddam since the 1960s.

The legislature was composed of the RCC itself, the National Assembly and a 50-member Kurdish Legislative Council which governed the country. During his presidency, Saddam was Chairman of the RCC and President of the Republic. Other members of the RCC included Salah Omar Al-Ali who held the position between 1968 and 1970, Abd al-Khaliq al-Samarra'i who was a Council member between 1968 and 1973, one of Saddam's half-brothers, Barzan Ibrahim al-Tikriti, Taha Yasin Ramadan, Adnan Khairallah, Sa'adoun Shaker Mahmoud, Tariq Aziz Isa, Hasan Ali Nassar al-Namiri, Naim Hamid Haddad and Taha Muhyiddin Maruf. It was officially dissolved in 2003 by Paul Bremer per Order Number 2 of the Coalition Provisional Authority.

== History ==
=== Origins ===
The Iraqi Revolutionary Command Council (RCC) was established as the de facto ruling power in Iraq after the military coup of 1968. However, its foundation materialized much earlier. The Revolution of 1958 mobilized a small group of young military officers known as the Free Officers. The Free Officers, headed by 'Abd al-Karim Qasim, agreed that Iraq should become a republic and that army officers should occupy all senior posts in the administration in hopes of keeping civilians subordinate to the officers. As Charles R. H. Tripp explains "the officers' power would be institutionalized in a Revolutionary Command Council, formed from the membership of the Supreme Committee [an organization of eleven ranking officers who helped plan the coup], and this body would wield supreme executive power in the wake of the overthrow of the monarchy." The capture of power by the military in 1958 greatly altered the political landscape in Iraq's government as military officers gained massive control over civilian and governmental affairs. 'Abd al-Karim Qasim formed a popular government that consolidated its power and redirected oil revenues. However, Qasim was overthrown in 1963 as the Ba’ath Party attempted to gain control. The Ba’thist contingent formed the National Council of the Revolutionary Command which exercised supreme power replacing the RCC. This regime's power was short-lived as new Ba’thists regained the upper hand and brothers Abd al-Salam ‘Arif and ‘Abd al-Rahman ruled Iraq for the next five years.

The coup in 1968 led to the rise of the Ba’ath Party as it regained control. The coup in 1968 led to the establishment of the Iraqi Revolutionary Command Council which became the ultimate decision-making body in Iraq during the Ba’ath’s rule from 1968 to 2003. Accordingly "under a provisional constitution adopted by the party in 1970, Iraq was confirmed as a republic, with legislative power theoretically vested in an elected legislature but also in the party-run RCC, without whose approval no law could be promulgated." Furthermore, "second to the council in political importance was the Regional Command of the Baath, the party executive, and third was the Council of Ministers." The legislature also included the National Assembly and a 50-member Kurdish Legislative Council.

The RCC was composed of a selective group of legislative leaders. The Ba’ath Party supported the RCC but it was not completely Ba’ath led. Under the Provisional Constitution, "article 43 assigns to the RCC, by a vote of two-thirds of its members, authority to promulgate laws and regulations, to deal with national security, to declare war and conclude peace, and to approve the government's budget. Article 38 stipulates that all newly elected members of the RCC must be members of the Baath Party Regional Command. The Constitution also provides for an appointed Council of Ministers that has responsibility for carrying out the executive decisions of the RCC.

"The chief executive of the RCC is the president, who serves as the commander in chief of the armed forces and as the head of both the government and the state." Ahmed Hassan al-Bakr became president, prime minister, chairman of the RCC and secretary-general of the Ba’ath Party, all these positions gave Bakr immense powers of patronage at his disposal. Al-Bakr maintained power until 1979 and then Saddam became the president of Iraq.

=== Leaders ===
Ahmed Hassan al-Bakr, President and Prime Minister of Iraq from 1968 to 1979, also held the position of Chairman of the Revolutionary Command Council. Al-Bakr's role as Chairman of the RCC strengthened and maintained his power and control of the decision-making process. Hassan al-Bakr's involvement in the RCC led to legislation that greatly reinforced the power of the Ba’ath party as he created a strong Ba’ath base within the government.

Charles Tripp makes the point that "in 1969, Saddam was appointed Vice-Chairman of the RCC, arguably the second most powerful office in the state." Al-Bakr and Saddam's political positions helped them consolidate their power and control. The RCC was mostly composed of Ba’ath leaders and their control limited the input from other groups. However, Shi‘i Iraqis were later accepted into the RCC to help appease the unrest among the Shi‘a in the 1970s. Many scholars argue that the powerful positions held by al-Bakr and Saddam in the RCC reinforced their supreme control of the Iraqi government. Saddam promoted an agenda of modernization as vice chairman of the RCC that included literacy and education.

In 1979, Saddam became President of Iraq and Chairman of RCC, with deputy chairman Izzat Ibrahim ad-Douri, and deputy Prime Ministers Tariq Aziz and Taha Yassin Ramadan. Izzat Ibrahim ad-Douri played an important role in leading the RCC during Saddam's rule. The council was led by the deputy chairman, ad-Douri. Through their leadership positions in the council, the deputy chairman and deputy prime minister worked on behalf of Saddam in the RCC to advance the Ba’ath Party's interests. The RCC was the supreme policy making force in Iraq until the American-led invasion in 2003 dissolved the council and replaced it with Coalition Provisional Authority. The power of the Coalition Provisional Authority (CPA) was transferred to newly appointed Iraqi Interim Government in 2004 and the CPA was dissolved in 2008.

=== Power and controversies ===
There is a debate among scholars regarding the true power of Hassan al-Bakr and Saddam Hussein in their relation to the Revolutionary Command Council. Some scholars argue that early on the RCC "functioned as a genuine collective decision-making body, and was often the arena for heated debates." Many argue it was Saddam who greatly changed and controlled the RCC by eliminating any manifestations of pluralism. The government under Saddam was often seen as a brutal dictatorship. In 1979, Saddam "accused dozens of party officers and party officials, including five of the RCC’s twenty-two members, of taking part in a Syrian plot against the regime. The accused were put on trial and sent to death. Saddam’s actions at the beginning of his presidency greatly limited the plurality in the RCC with his accusations against the Syrian plot "conspirators." This action consolidated his power in the RCC.

The Revolutionary Command Council passed a multitude of controversial legislation that advanced only the interests of the Ba’ath Party in Iraq. For example, "Article 200, and the Penal Code of 1969 and its various amendments, provide the death penalty for anyone joining the Ba’ath Party while concealing any previous political affiliation, or who resigns from it to join another party."

During the Iraq-Iran War, Saddam used the Revolutionary Command Council as his personal headquarters; Saddam maintained tight control of war operations. Saddam's tight control limited the power of field commanders and this resulted in an intense conflict between the highest command and the commanders fighting the war. The military showed signs of discontent in 1982, and Saddam responded by executing some three hundred high-ranking officers.

=== Final years ===
Subsequently, in the 1990s, "reports in the BMJ drew attention to a series of decrees of the RCC introducing amputation of the right hand as judicial punishment for theft, with amputation of the left foot for a second offence, amputation of one ear for evasion of the draft, military desertion, or harbouring deserters." Amnesty International received reports that confirmed the governmental judicial acts of amputation. After the Gulf War, the United Nations Special Commission (UNSCOM) was created to ensure Iraq's compliance with policies regarding the production of WMDs. The commission conducted weapons inspections in Iraq. The U.S. used Iraq's failure to comply with weapons inspections to prompt the American-led invasion of Iraq in 2003. Finally, Saddam's regime ended as the U.S. invaded and captured him.

Many scholars such as Charles Tripp argue that Saddam's complete control of both the executive and legislative components of the government led to the rise of a brutal dictatorship that crushed any forms of opposition.Saddam used his vast powers to strengthen the Ba’ath Party and his control. Groups in opposition to the Ba’ath Party increasingly became disconnected from the political process and victimized for their differences.
