= CIA activities in Iraq =

The United States (U.S.) Central Intelligence Agency (CIA) has been involved in covert actions and contingency planning in Iraq ever since the 1958 overthrow of the Iraqi monarchy, although the historiography of Iraq–United States relations prior to the 1980s is considered relatively underdeveloped, with the first in-depth academic studies being published in the 2010s.

The CIA is alleged to have sponsored an unsuccessful Ba'athist assassination plot against Iraqi leader Abd al-Karim Qasim in 1959, although several scholars have disputed this. The CIA is documented to have planned to "incapacitate" a high-ranking member of Qasim's government with a poisoned handkerchief in 1960, and began plotting to remove Qasim from power since mid-1962, cultivating supportive relationships with Iraqi opposition groups including the Ba'ath Party.

It has long been suspected that the CIA collaborated with the Ba'ath Party in planning and carrying out its 1963 coup against Qasim, supported by a considerable amount of circumstantial evidence and testimony from both contemporary Ba'athists and some U.S. government officials. Scholars have only begun to understand the extent of the CIA's role in the 1963 coup, however they remain divided in their interpretations of U.S. foreign policy, specifically regarding the extent of direct CIA involvement. After the 1968 Ba'athist coup appeared to draw Iraq into the Soviet sphere of influence, the CIA colluded with the then-monarchial government of Iran to destabilize Iraq by arming Kurdish rebels, who suffered a total defeat after Iran and Iraq resolved their border dispute. Beginning in 1982, the CIA began providing Iraq intelligence during the Iran–Iraq War. The CIA was also involved in the failed 1996 coup against Saddam Hussein.

Intelligence played an important and generally effective role in the Gulf War in the early 1990s, but was much more controversial with respect to justifying and planning the invasion of Iraq in 2003. See the appropriate chronological entries below.

== 1958: Intelligence analysis: 14 July Revolution ==
Relations between the United States (U.S.) and Iraq became strained following the overthrow of the Iraqi monarchy on July 14, 1958, which resulted in the declaration of a republican government led by Brigadier Abd al-Karim Qasim. Qasim planned the operation, but it was led on the ground by Colonel Abdul Salam Arif. Longtime Central Intelligence Agency (CIA) officer Harry Rositzke recounted that "rumors of army plotting had been circulating for months in Baghdad," but "neither CIA agents nor the Iraqi plotters could tell when the coup would take place, for the timing depended on a fluke." In addition, a subsequent State Department investigation noted that "while Iraqi and U.S. intelligence agencies knew of Qasim, he was never believed to be a cause for concern." Director of Central Intelligence Allen Dulles told President Dwight D. Eisenhower the CIA "lacked hard evidence implicating" Egypt's Gamal Abdel Nasser in the coup, though it was Nasser-inspired. On July 15, Eisenhower responded to the upheaval in Iraq by sending U.S. marines to Lebanon at the request of Lebanese President Camille Chamoun, with the goal of helping Chamoun's pro-Western government restore order after months of civil unrest. The Eisenhower administration initially worried about "Ba'athist or Communist exploitation of the situation," but recognized the new Iraqi government on July 30.

Qasim styled himself the "sole leader" of Iraq and rejected any association with Nasser, whereas Arif publicly advocated that Iraq join the United Arab Republic (UAR)—a short-lived union of Egypt and Syria. On September 30, Qasim attempted to neutralize Arif by sending him to West Germany as an ambassador; yet on October 2, Dulles predicted: "In all probability, we have not heard the last of [him]." Egyptian agents in Bonn worked with Arif on a conspiracy to depose Qasim, but Arif was arrested not long after he returned to Baghdad on November 4. The United Kingdom (U.K.), which "hoped ... [to] cultivate him as an Iraqi alternative to Nasser," alerted Qasim to another failed Egyptian coup attempt in December. "Nasser's meddling soon forced Qasim to turn to the communists to secure a base of support to protect his regime from the nationalists."

== 1959: Special Committee on Iraq; Egyptian covert actions ==
Concerned about the influence of Iraqi Communist Party (ICP) members in Qasim's administration, Eisenhower began questioning if "it might be good policy to help [Nasser] take over in Iraq," recommending that Nasser be provided with "money and support." Secretary of State, John Foster Dulles, warned against this, stating that it was "essential to keep our hands off Iraq" because the U.S. was not "sufficiently sophisticated to mix into this complicated situation," ultimately however, the U.S. "moved into increasingly close alignment with Egypt with regard to Qasim and Iraq." On March 24, Iraq—to the consternation of U.S. officials—withdrew from an anti-Soviet alliance, the Baghdad Pact. In April, the United States National Security Council (NSC) established a Special Committee on Iraq (SCI) to reexamine the situation, propose various contingencies for preventing a communist takeover of the country, and "soon developed a detailed plan for assisting nationalist elements committed to the overthrow of Qasim." The U.S. also "approached Nasser to discuss 'parallel measures' that could be taken by the two countries against Iraq." Both covert and military intervention was contemplated, but this "horrified" the U.S. ambassador in Baghdad, John Jernegan, who "eventually persuaded the administration to instead press Nasser into modifying his propaganda against Iraq to focus not on Qasim but the communists." Nasser agreed, and Qasim soon undertook numerous repressive measures against the communists, temporarily leading some U.S. officials to believe that communist influence in Iraq was diminishing by August 1959.

U.S. perturbation was renewed shortly thereafter on August 25, after an Iraqi court sentenced to death nationalist conspirators involved in the unsuccessful 1959 Mosul coup, and climaxed on September 20 when "Qasim approved the executions of a senior Free Officer and 12 other nationalist officers involved" in the attempted coup, "in addition to 4 civilian members of the monarchy." U.S. intelligence also asserted that although Qasim limited the activities of the ICP, he "continued and even expanded" his ties to the Soviet Union. These events lead the SCI to meet on September 24 to assess the situation. During this meeting, two representatives from the State Department urged a cautious approach, while the other twelve representatives, namely from the CIA and Department of Defense, "strong[ly] pitch[ed] for a more active policy toward Iraq." One CIA representative noted that there is a "small stockpile [of weapons] in the area," and that the CIA "could support elements in Jordan and the UAR to help Iraqis filter back to Iraq." That same day, the SCI would also prepare a study titled "Preventing a Communist Takeover in Iraq" which called for "covert assistance to Egyptian efforts to topple Qasim," and for "grooming political leadership for a successor government."

Bryan R. Gibson writes that "there is no documentation that ties the United States directly to any of Nasser's many covert attempts to overthrow the Qasim regime." On the other hand, Brandon Wolfe-Hunnicutt states that the U.S. issued its "tacit support for Egyptian efforts to bring [Qasim's government] down." The SCI was finally shut down in January 1961.

=== UPI report ===
Richard Sale of United Press International (UPI), citing former U.S. diplomat and intelligence officials, Adel Darwish, and other experts, reported that the unsuccessful October 7, 1959 assassination attempt on Qasim involving a young Saddam Hussein and other Ba'athist conspirators was a collaboration between the CIA and Egyptian intelligence. Pertinent contemporary records relating to CIA operations in Iraq have remained classified or heavily redacted, thus "allow[ing] for plausible deniability." Gibson has disputed Sale and Darwish's account, citing available declassified documents which Gibson states indicate that the NSC "had just reaffirmed [its] nonintervention policy" on October 1, while Dulles predicted six days prior to the incident that an attempt on Qasim's life might be made "in the next two months," which Gibson suggests is indicative of "a lack of concrete intelligence." Considering that U.S. officials sought to dissuade Jordan and Iran from militarily intervening in Iraq during Qasim's hospitalization, Gibson surmised that "while the United States was aware of several plots against Qasim, it had still adhered to its nonintervention policy." Wolfe-Hunnicutt observes: "I am unaware of any evidence of covert relations between the CIA and the Ba'ath prior to the October 7 [assassination attempt]. ... It seems more likely that it was October 7 that brought the Ba'ath to the attention of the US government." However, Kenneth Osgood—while acknowledging that there is "little direct documentary proof" of American participation in the plot—comments that because it is widely accepted that Egypt "was involved on some level" and that "The United States was working with Nasser on some level ... the circumstantial evidence is such that the possibility of US–UAR collaboration with Ba'ath Party activists cannot be ruled out." Moreover, the CIA was engaged in contingency planning against Qasim's government during the time period in question: "Whatever the validity of [Sale's] charges, at the very least currently declassified documents reveal that US officials were actively considering various plots against Qasim and that the CIA was building up assets for covert operations in Iraq."

Eisenhower publicly expressed hope that Qasim quickly recover from his injuries, although privately U.S. officials "expressed growing interest in the Ba'th and its effort to topple Qasim." The assassins, including Saddam, escaped to Cairo, Egypt "where they enjoyed Nasser's protection for the remainder of Qasim's tenure in power." Hazim Jawad—one of the conspirators involved in the assassination attempt, who would also later become minister of state in the Ba'athist regime that overthrew and executed Qasim in 1963—"received training from the UAR intelligence service in clandestine wireless telegraphy," before returning to Iraq in 1960 to coordinate "clandestine radio operations for the UAR." Wolfe-Hunnicutt writes that in the 1959-1960 period—during the "peak of US-UAR intelligence collaboration"—that "[i]t is quite possible that Jawad became familiar to US intelligence," as a 1963 State Department cable described Jawad as "one of our boys."

The assassination attempt failed after Saddam (who was only supposed to provide cover) opened fire on Qasim, it led to widespread exposure for Saddam and the Ba'ath within Iraq, where both had previously languished in obscurity, and later became a crucial part of Saddam's public image during his tenure as president of Iraq. It is possible that Saddam visited the U.S. embassy in Cairo during his exile, and some evidence suggests that he was "in frequent contact with US officials and intelligence agents." A former high-ranking U.S. official told Marion Farouk–Sluglett and Peter Sluglett that Iraqi Ba'athists, including Saddam, "had made contact with the American authorities in the late 1950s and early 1960s." Saddam would remain exiled from Iraq until 1963, after Qasim's overthrowal and execution by the Ba'athists, becoming a key organizer within the Iraqi Ba'ath Party's civilian wing upon his return.

== 1960: "Incapacitation" plot considered ==
According to the Church Committee report:

In February 1960, CIA's Near East Division sought the endorsement of what the Division Chief [James H. Critchfield] called the "Health Alteration Committee" for its proposal for a "special operation" to "incapacitate" an Iraqi Colonel believed to be "promoting Soviet bloc political interests in Iraq." The Division sought the Committee's advice on a technique, "which while not likely to result in total disablement would be certain to prevent the target from pursuing his usual activities for a minimum of three months," adding: "We do not consciously seek subject's permanent removal from the scene; we also do not object should this complication develop." ... In April [1962], the [Health Alteration] Committee unanimously recommended to the DDP [Deputy Director for Plans, Richard M. Bissell Jr.] that a "disabling operation" be undertaken, noting that the Chief of Operations advised that it would be "highly desirable." Bissell's deputy, Tracy Barnes, approved on behalf of Bissell ... The approved operation was to mail a monogrammed handkerchief containing an incapacitating agent to the colonel from an Asian country. [James] Scheider [Science Advisor to Bissell] testified that, while he did not now recall the name of the recipient, he did remember mailing from the Asian country, during the period in question, a handkerchief "treated with some kind of material for the purpose of harassing that person who received it." ... During the course of this Committee's investigation, the CIA stated that the handkerchief was "in fact never received (if, indeed, sent)." It added that the colonel: "Suffered a terminal illness before a firing squad in Baghdad (an event we had nothing to do with) not very long after our handkerchief proposal was considered."

Iraq was not a central focus of the Church Committee, and the Committee did not further examine the case. Details and documentation about the operation remain scarce. "James Scheider"—an alias for Sidney Gottlieb, a CIA field agent specializing in assassinations via poisoning and head of the MKUltra program—would testify that he mailed the poisoned handkerchief "for the purpose of harassing" its recipient, but that "he did not now recall the name of the recipient." Although some sources state that Qasim was the intended recipient of the poisoned handkerchief, circumstantial evidence indicates that Colonel Fahdil Abbas al-Mahdawi—Qasim's cousin who headed the Special High Military Court (colloquially known as the "People's Court")—was the more likely target. Qasim did not openly promote Soviet interests in Iraq, on the other hand, al-Mahdawi, while not a communist, sympathized with the ICP leading U.S. officials to view al-Mahdawi's activities as "Soviet penetration into Iraqi society," and "used his prominence at any given moment as a barometer of communist influence on Qasim." Also, Qasim—unlike al-Mahdawi—was not a colonel but a brigadier general. Qasim pointedly refused to license the ICP as a legal party in January 1960, but al-Mahdawi remained a crucial conduit between Qasim's government and several communist-front groups—including the "Peace Partisans," which was allowed to operate in public despite being formally outlawed in May 1961—and was known for his outspoken praise for Fidel Castro as well as his trips throughout the Soviet Union, the Eastern Bloc, and China. In 1991, former high-ranking U.S. diplomat Hermann Eilts told journalist Elaine Sciolino that al-Mahdawi had been the target.

== 1961: Intelligence analysis: Ba'ath Party ==
In 1961 and 1962, we increased our interest in the Ba'ath—not to actively support it—but politically and intellectually, we found the Ba'ath interesting. We found it particularly active in Iraq. Our analysis of the Ba'ath was that it was comparatively moderate at that time, and that the United States could easily adjust to and support its policies. So we watched the Ba'ath's long, slow preparation to take control. They planned to do it several times, and postponed it.

— James H. Critchfield, head of the CIA's Near East Division from 1959—1969.

By 1961, the CIA had cultivated at least one high-level informant within the Iraqi wing of the Ba'ath Party, enabling it to monitor the Party's activities.

== 1962: Planning for regime change ==
A CIA cable reveals that the Ba'ath Party "first approached Arif about a coup in April 1962."

In mid-1962, alarmed by Qasim's threats to invade Kuwait and his government's expropriation of 99.5% of the British- and American-owned Iraq Petroleum Company's (IPC) concessionary holdings, President John F. Kennedy ordered the CIA to make preparations for a military coup that would remove him from power. Archie Roosevelt, Jr. was tasked with leading the operation. A high-ranking CIA officer stationed in Iran at the time told Gibson that "while the CIA was interested in the Ba'ath Party, the military was in fact its primary focus." Around the same time, the CIA penetrated a top-secret Iraqi-Soviet surface-to-air missile project, which yielded intelligence on the Soviet Union's ballistic missile program.

Also in 1962, al-Mahdawi and some of his family members were stricken with a serious case of what al-Mahdawi dubbed "influenza." It is unknown whether this ailment was related to the CIA's plan to poison al-Mahdawi in April 1962; Nathan J. Citino observes that "the timing of the illness does not correspond exactly to that of the 'incapacitating' operation as described in the cited testimony."

== 1963: Involvement in the Ramadan Revolution ==
While it's still early, the Iraqi revolution seems to have succeeded. It is almost certainly a net gain for our side. ... We will make informal friendly noises as soon as we can find out whom to talk with, and ought to recognize as soon as we're sure these guys are firmly in the saddle. CIA had excellent reports on the plotting, but I doubt either they or UK should claim much credit for it.

— Robert Komer to President John F. Kennedy, February 8, 1963.

On February 7, 1963 State Department executive secretary William Brubeck wrote that Iraq had become "one of the more useful spots for acquiring technical information on Soviet military and industrial equipment and on Soviet methods of operation in nonaligned areas." U.S. officials were instructed not to respond to Qasim's claims that the U.S. was supporting Kurdish rebels out of a desire to preserve the remaining U.S. presence in Iraq, following an earlier downgrade in relations to the chargé d'affaires level caused by the U.S. accepting the credentials of a new Kuwaiti ambassador in June 1962. According to Bryan R. Gibson, with access to an "intelligence bonanza" hanging in the balance, U.S. officials were showing "great reluctance about aggravating Qasim."

The Iraqi Ba'ath Party overthrew and executed Qasim in a violent coup on February 8, 1963. al-Mahdawi was executed along with Qasim: "Their bodies were then exhibited on state television in a gruesome, five-minute film called The End of the Criminals that aired immediately following prayers and a Felix the Cat cartoon." It has long been suspected that the Ba'ath Party collaborated with the CIA in planning and carrying out the coup. Pertinent contemporary documents relating to the CIA's operations in Iraq have remained classified and as of 2021, "[s]cholars are only beginning to uncover the extent to which the United States was involved in organizing the coup," but are "divided in their interpretations of American foreign policy." Bryan R. Gibson, writes that although "[i]t is accepted among scholars that the CIA ... assisted the Ba’th Party in its overthrow of [Qasim's] regime," that "barring the release of new information, the preponderance of evidence substantiates the conclusion that the CIA was not behind the February 1963 Ba'thist coup." Peter Hahn argues that "[d]eclassified U.S. government documents offer no evidence to support" suggestions of direct U.S. involvement. On the other hand, Brandon Wolfe-Hunnicutt cites "compelling evidence of an American role," and that publicly declassified documents "largely substantiate the plausibility" of CIA involvement in the coup. Eric Jacobsen, citing the testimony of contemporary prominent Ba'athists and U.S. government officials, states that "[t]here is ample evidence that the CIA not only had contacts with the Iraqi Ba'th in the early sixties, but also assisted in the planning of the coup." Nathan J. Citino writes that "Washington backed the movement by military officers linked to the pan-Arab Ba‘th Party that overthrew Qasim," but that "the extent of U.S. responsibility cannot be fully established on the basis of available documents," and that "[a]lthough the United States did not initiate the 14 Ramadan coup, at best it condoned and at worst it contributed to the violence that followed."

Ba'athist leaders maintained supportive relationships with U.S. officials before, during, and after the coup. According to Wolfe-Hunnicutt, declassified documents at the Kennedy Library suggest that the Kennedy administration viewed two prominent Ba'athist officials—Ba'ath Party Army Bureau head, Lt. Col. Salih Mahdi Ammash, whose arrest on February 4 served as the coup's catalyst, and Hazim Jawad, "responsible for [the Ba'ath Party's] clandestine printing and propaganda distribution operations"—as "assets." Ammash was described as "Western-oriented, anti-British, and anti-Communist," and known to be "friendly to the service attaches of the US Embassy in Baghdad," while future U.S. Ambassador to Iraq, Robert C. Strong, would refer to Jawad as "one of our boys." According to a March 1964 State Department memorandum, U.S. "officers assiduously cultivated" a "Baathi student organization, which triggered the revolution of February 8, 1963 by sponsoring a successful student strike at the University of Baghdad." Jamal al-Atassi—a cabinet member of the Ba'athist regime that took power in Syria that same year—would tell Malik Mufti that the Iraqi Ba'athists, in conversations with their Syrian counterparts, argued "that their cooperation with the CIA and the US to overthrow Abd al-Karim Qasim and take over power" was comparable "to how Lenin arrived in a German train to carry out his revolution, saying they had arrived in an American train." Similarly, then secretary general of the Iraqi Ba'ath Party, Ali Salih al-Sa'di, is quoted as saying that the Iraqi Ba'athists "came to power on a CIA train." Former U.S. Ambassador to Saudi Arabia, James E. Akins, who worked in the Baghdad Embassy's political section from 1961 to 1964, would state that he personally witnessed contacts between Ba'ath Party members and CIA officials, and that:

The [1963 Ba'athist] revolution was of course supported by the U.S. in money and equipment as well. I don't think the equipment was terribly important, but the money was to the Ba'ath Party leaders who took over the revolution. It wasn't talked about openly—that we were behind it—but an awful lot of people knew.

Conversely, according to Gibson, the CIA official working to instigate a military coup against Qasim, and who later became the head of the CIA's operations in Iraq and Syria, has "denied any involvement in the Ba'ath Party's actions," stating instead that the CIA's efforts against Qasim were still in the planning stages at the time: "I was still engaged in contacting people who could play a role in a coup attempt against [him]." Nevertheless, U.S. officials were undoubtedly pleased with the coup's outcome, ultimately approving a $55 million arms deal with Iraq and urging America's Arab allies to oppose a Soviet-sponsored diplomatic offensive accusing Iraq of genocide against its Kurdish minority at the United Nations (UN) General Assembly.

=== Aftermath ===
In its ascension to power, the Ba'athists "methodically hunted down Communists" thanks to "mimeographed lists [...] complete with home addresses and auto license plate numbers." While it is unlikely that the Ba'athists would've needed assistance in identifying Iraqi communists, it is widely believed that the CIA provided the National Guard with lists of communists and other leftists, who were then arrested or killed under al-Wanadawi's and al-Sa'di's direction. This claim first originated in a September 27, 1963 Al-Ahram interview with King Hussein of Jordan, who declared:

You tell me that American Intelligence was behind the 1957 events in Jordan. Permit me to tell you that I know for a certainty that what happened in Iraq on 8 February had the support of American Intelligence. Some of those who now rule in Baghdad do not know of this thing but I am aware of the truth. Numerous meetings were held between the Ba'ath party and American Intelligence, the more important in Kuwait. Do you know that ... on 8 February a secret radio beamed to Iraq was supplying the men who pulled the coup with the names and addresses of the Communists there so that they could be arrested and executed? ... Yet I am the one accused of being an agent of America and imperialism!

Similarly, Qasim's former foreign minister, Hashim Jawad, would state that "the Iraqi Foreign Ministry had information of complicity between the Ba'ath and the CIA. In many cases the CIA supplied the Ba'ath with the names of individual communists, some of whom were taken from their homes and murdered." Gibson emphasizes that the Ba'athists compiled their own lists, citing Bureau of Intelligence and Research reports stating that "[Communist] party members [are being] rounded up on the basis of lists prepared by the now-dominant Ba'th Party" and that the ICP had "exposed virtually all its assets" whom the Ba'athists had "carefully spotted and listed." On the other hand, Wolfe-Hunnicutt, citing contemporary U.S. counterinsurgency doctrine, notes that assertions of CIA involvement in the Ba'athist purge campaign "would be consistent with American special warfare doctrine" regarding U.S. covert support to anti-communist "Hunter-Killer" teams "seeking the violent overthrow of a communist dominated and supported government", and "speaks to a larger pattern in American foreign policy," drawing parallels to other instances where the CIA compiled lists of suspected communists targeted for execution, such as Guatemala in 1954 and Indonesia in 1965-66. Also, Citino and Wolfe-Hunnicutt note that two officials in the U.S. embassy in Baghdad—William Lakeland and James E. Akins—"used coverage of the July 1962 Moscow Conference for Disarmament and Peace in Iraq's leftist press to compile lists of Iraqi communists and their supporters ... Those listed included merchants, students, members of professional societies, and journalists, although university professors constituted the largest single group." Wolfe-Hunnicutt comments that "it’s not unreasonable to suspect [such a] list – or ones like it – would have been shared with the Ba‘ath." Lakeland, a former SCI participant, "personally maintained contact following the coup with a National Guard interrogator," and may have been influenced by his prior interaction with then-Major Hasan Mustafa al-Naqib, the Iraqi military attaché in the U.S. who defected to the Ba'ath Party after Qasim "upheld Mahdawi's death sentences" against nationalists involved in the 1959 Mosul uprising. Furthermore, "Weldon C. Mathews has meticulously established that National Guard leaders who participated in human rights abuses had been trained in the United States as part of a police program run by the International Cooperation Administration and Agency for International Development."

The attacks on the people's freedoms carried out by the ... bloodthirsty members of the National Guard, their violation of things sacred, their disregard of the law, the injuries they have done to the state and the people, and finally their armed rebellion on November 13, 1963, has led to an intolerable situation which is fraught with grave dangers to the future of this people which is an integral part of the Arab nation. We have endured all we could. ... The army has answered the call of the people to rid them from this terror.

— President Abdul Salam Arif, 1963.

The Ba'athist government collapsed in November 1963 over the question of unification with Syria (where a rival branch of the Ba'ath Party had seized power in March) and the extremist and uncontrollable behavior of al-Sa'di's National Guard. President Arif, with the overwhelming support of the Iraqi military, purged Ba'athists from the government and ordered the National Guard to stand down; although Bakr had conspired with Arif to remove al-Sa'di, on January 5, 1964, Arif removed Bakr from his new position as vice president, fearful of allowing the Ba'ath Party to retain a foothold inside his government. Throughout the Party's brief time in power, British and Israeli officials as well as the representatives of Western oil companies were generally skeptical of the Ba'ath, but U.S. officials including ambassador Robert C. Strong had what Wolfe-Hunnicutt characterizes as a "romantic" conception of the Ba'athist ability to modernize Iraq, and attributed reports of the National Guard's cruelty and fanaticism to what Lakeland dubbed "the well-known Arab tendency to exaggerate." After the November coup, however, mounting evidence of Ba'athist atrocities emerged, and Lakeland authored "a devastating postmortem on the Ba'athist regime" in which he concluded: "The popular revulsion against the Ba'ath for this particular reason is largely justified, and therefore will have a more or less permanent effect on the political developments in the country—particularly on the prospects of a Ba'athi revival." Similarly, the Slugletts describe the Ba'athists as having cultivated a "profoundly unsavory image" through "acts of wanton brutality" on a scale without prior precedent in Iraq, including "some of the most terrible scenes of violence hitherto experienced in the postwar Middle East": "As almost every family in Baghdad was affected—and both men and women were equally maltreated—the Ba'athists' activities aroused a degree of intense loathing for them that has persisted to this day among many Iraqis of that generation."

== 1968: Intelligence analysis: Ba'athist coup ==
Under the presidencies of Arif, and, especially, his brother Abdul Rahman Arif, the U.S. and Iraq developed closer ties than at any point since the 1958 revolution. The Lyndon B. Johnson administration favorably perceived Arif's willingness to partially reverse Qasim's expropriation of the IPC's concessionary holding in July 1965 (although the resignation of six cabinet members and widespread disapproval among the Iraqi public forced him to abandon this plan), as well as pro-Western lawyer Abd al-Rahman al-Bazzaz's brief tenure as prime minister (which straddled the presidencies of both Arif brothers); Bazzaz attempted to implement a peace agreement with the Kurdish rebels following a decisive Kurdish victory at the Battle of Mount Handren in May 1966. (Under Qasim, Law 80 did not impact the IPC's ongoing production at Az Zubair and Kirkuk, but all other territories were returned to Iraqi state control. The July 1965 draft agreement between the IPC and oil minister Abdul Aziz al-Wattari would have allowed the IPC to regain majority control of North Rumaila.) Having established a friendship with ambassador Strong prior to assuming the presidency and making a number of friendly gestures to the U.S. between April 1966 and January 1967, Western analysts regarded Rahman Arif (hereinafter referred to as "Arif") as an Iraqi moderate. At Arif's request, President Lyndon B. Johnson met five Iraqi generals and Iraqi ambassador Nasir Hani in the White House on January 25, 1967, reiterating his "desire to build an ever closer relationship between [the] two governments." According to Johnson's National Security Adviser, Walt Whitman Rostow, the NSC even contemplated welcoming Arif on a state visit to the U.S., although this proposal was ultimately rejected due to concerns about the stability of his government. Prior to the outbreak of the Six-Day War, Iraqi Foreign Minister Adnan Pachachi met with a number of U.S. officials to discuss the escalating Middle East crisis on June 1, including U.S. ambassador to the UN Arthur Goldberg, Under Secretary of State for Political Affairs Eugene V. Rostow, Secretary of State Dean Rusk, and President Johnson himself. The political atmosphere engendered by the costly Arab defeat prompted Iraq to break relations with the U.S. on June 7, and ultimately ensured the collapse of Arif's relatively moderate government.

Like his brother, Arif previously tried to balance radical and moderate elements in Iraq, but this balancing act was upended by the war as Arif moved to placate the ascendant Iraqi nationalists, notably by reappointing Tahir Yahya to the position of prime minister. Yahya had announced his intention to create a national oil company during his first premiership in late 1963, laying the groundwork for the founding of the Iraq National Oil Company (INOC) in February 1964. During his second term as prime minister from July 1967 to July 1968, Yahya moved to revitalize the INOC and sought to work with France and the Soviet Union to develop the technical capacity to nationalize the IPC outright, pledging to use Iraq's "oil as a weapon in the battle against Israel." Yahya's government concluded deals with the French to develop fields near Amarah in October–November 1967 and the INOC commenced drilling in North Rumaila in May 1968, bringing Iraq to the brink of nationalization.

Until things sort themselves out, and until we get better information—we have no representation in Baghdad—it's impossible to tell what the effect of last night's coup will be. ... The intelligence community's initial reading is that the new group—apparently Baathists—will be more difficult than their predecessors, but at this point no one knows how radical they will be. So far, their communiques have taken a fairly moderate line by Iraqi standards, promising economic reforms, honest government, a 'wise' solution of the Kurdish problem, and Arab unity against the Zionist and Imperialist threats. On the other hand, if these people are Baathists, their tendencies will be towards moving Iraq even closer to Fatah, the Syrians and the Soviets.

— NSC official John W. Foster to Walt Whitman Rostow, July 17, 1968.

In May 1968, the CIA produced a report titled "The Stagnant Revolution," stating that radicals in the Iraqi Armed Forces posed a threat to the Arif government, and while "the balance of forces is such that no group feels power enough to take decisive steps," the ensuing gridlock had created "a situation in which many important political and economic matters are simply ignored." In June 1968, Belgian officials relayed a message from the U.S. State Department to Iraqi officials, offering to resume normal relations if Iraq agreed to provide compensation for damage to the U.S. embassy and consulate incurred during an earlier protest and met other conditions, including an end to the Iraqi boycott of U.S. goods and services imposed after Israel's 1967 victory; although U.S. officials were hoping to prevent a coup, there is no indication of any Iraqi response to this overture.

On July 17, the Iraqi Ba'ath Party—led by Bakr as president, in collaboration with the non-Ba'athists Abd ar-Rahman al-Dawud as defence minister and Abd ar-Razzaq an-Naif as prime minister—seized power in a bloodless coup, placing Arif on a plane to London. Remembering the collapse of the short-lived coalition government in 1963, Bakr quickly ordered Naif and Dawud to be removed from their posts and exiled on July 30, cementing the Ba'ath Party's control over Iraq until the U.S.-led invasion in March 2003. Bakr was then named prime minister and commander-in-chief of the army. Many details of the coup remain unclear to historians. The U.S. embassy in Beirut (which became the major American source for intelligence on Iraq after the U.S. embassy in Baghdad was closed) speculated that Naif and Dawud—who were, respectively, in charge of President Arif's military intelligence and personal security—initiated the plot, and that Ba'athist conspirators including Bakr, Hardan al-Tikriti, and Salih Mahdi Ammash were only asked to participate in order to establish a broader coalition of support for a new government. However, Wolfe-Hunnicutt states: "Though executed by Nayef, the coup was organised by Bakr and his deputy Saddam Hussein." On August 2, Iraqi Foreign Minister Abdul Karim Sheikhli announced that Iraq would seek close ties "with the socialist camp, particularly the Soviet Union and the Chinese People's Republic." By late November, the U.S. embassy in Beirut reported that Iraq had released many leftist and communist dissidents, although "there [was] no indication ... [they had] been given any major role in the regime." As the Arif government had recently signed a major oil deal with the Soviets, the Ba'ath Party's rapid attempts to improve relations with Moscow were not a complete shock to U.S. policymakers, but they "provided a glimpse at a strategic alliance that would soon emerge."

Behind the scenes, Tikriti (now Iraqi minister of defence) attempted to open a discreet line of communication with the U.S. government through a representative of the American oil company Mobil, but this overture was rebuffed by the Johnson administration as it had come to perceive the Ba'ath Party, in both Iraq and Syria, as too closely associated with the Soviet Union. In December, Iraqi troops based in Jordan began shelling Israeli settlers in the Jordan Valley, which led to a strong response by the Israeli Air Force. Bakr claimed that a "fifth column of agents of Israel and the U.S. was striking from behind," and, on December 14, the Iraqi government alleged it had discovered "an Israeli spy network" plotting to "bring about a change in the Iraqi regime," arresting dozens of individuals on fabricated espionage charges.

== 1970: Iran backs coup attempt against the Ba'ath ==
Estimates on the size of the crowds that came to view the dangling corpses spread seventy meters apart in Liberation Square—increasing the area of sensual contact between mutilated body and mass—vary from 150,000 to 500,000. Peasants streamed in from the surrounding countryside to hear the speeches. The proceedings, along with the bodies, continued for twenty-four hours, during which the President, Ahmed Hassan al-Bakr, and a host of other luminaries gave speeches and orchestrated the carnival-like atmosphere.

— Kanan Makiya describing the 1969 Baghdad hangings.

The Richard Nixon administration was confronted with an early foreign policy crisis when Iraq publicly executed 14 people, including 9 Iraqi Jews on fabricated espionage charges at the end of January 1969. The Nixon administration initially sought to stay the executions by convincing American allies with close ties to Iraq—such as France, Spain, and India—to apply pressure on the government, but Iraqi officials responded "in no uncertain terms, to stay out of [Iraq's] domestic affairs." The U.S. also urged UN Secretary General U Thant to intervene, but he was unable to influence Baghdad's decision. Nixon's Secretary of State, William P. Rogers, condemned the executions as "repugnant to the conscience of the world," while U.S. ambassador to the UN Charles Yost took the matter to the UN Security Council, stating that Iraq's actions were "designed to arouse emotions and to intensify the very explosive atmosphere of suspicion and hostility in the Middle East."

In early 1968, the United Kingdom had announced its intention to withdraw its forces from "East of Suez"—including the Persian Gulf region—thus alarming U.S. officials and prompting the Johnson administration to formulate what became known as the "twin pillar policy," in which the U.S. would support Iran and Saudi Arabia in their efforts to maintain the Gulf's stability. The Nixon administration would ultimately revise this policy by focusing on building up Iran, then ruled by Nixon's old friend Shah Mohammad Reza Pahlavi (hereinafter referred to as "the Shah"), as the dominant regional power. The Shah distrusted the Ba'athist government in Iraq, which he considered a "bunch of thugs and murderers." Following Iraq's provocative actions in January 1969, the Shah sought to "punish" Iraq, and possibly win partial Iranian sovereignty over the Shatt al-Arab waterway—which a 1937 treaty had given Iraq almost complete control over—through a series of coercive measures: At the beginning of March, he arranged for Iran's Kurdish allies to attack IPC installations around Kirkuk and Mosul, causing Iraq millions of dollars in damage; in April, he unilaterally abrogated the 1937 treaty; and in January 1970, he sponsored a failed coup attempt against the Iraqi government. The Shah knew that most of Iraq's army was deployed in Kurdistan—while an additional three Iraqi brigades were stationed in Jordan—thus Iraq was in no position to retaliate militarily, but he offered to "break off supplies to the Kurds in return for concessions in the Shatt," a proposal Iraq rejected.

The Shah's aggressive actions convinced Iraq to seek an end to the Kurdish War. In late December 1969, Bakr sent Saddam to negotiate directly with Kurdistan Democratic Party (KDP) leader Mustafa Barzani and his close aide Dr. Mahmoud Othman. The Shah was outraged when he learned of these negotiations, and sponsored a coup against the Iraqi government, which was scheduled for the night of January 20–21, 1970. However, Iraq's security forces had "complete recordings of most of the meetings and interviews that took place," foiling the plot, expelling the Iranian ambassador to Iraq, and executing "at least 33 conspirators" by January 23. On January 24, Iraq announced its support for Kurdish autonomy, and on March 11, Saddam and Barzani reached an agreement (dubbed the "March Accord") "to recognize the binational character of Iraq ... [and] allow for the establishment of a self-governing region of Kurdistan," which was to be implemented by March 1974, although U.S. officials were skeptical that the agreement would prove binding.

There were allegations of American involvement in the failed 1970 coup attempt, which involved a coalition of Iraqi factions, including Kurdish opponents of the Ba'ath Party. Edmund Ghareeb claimed that the CIA reached an agreement to help the Kurds overthrow the Iraqi government in August 1969, although there is little evidence to support this claim, and the CIA officer in charge of operations in Iraq and Syria in 1969 "denied any U.S. involvement with the Kurds prior to 1972." The State Department was informed of the plot by Iraqi businessman Loufti Obeidi on August 15, but strongly refused to provide any assistance. Iraqi exile Sa'ad Jabr discussed the coup planning with officials at the U.S. embassy in Beirut on December 8; embassy officials reiterated that the U.S. could not involve itself in the conspiracy, although on December 10 the State Department authorized the embassy to tell Jabr "we would be prepared to consider prompt resumption of diplomatic relations and would certainly be disposed to cooperate within the limits of existing legislation and our overall policy" if the "new government prove[d] to be moderate and friendly." In late August 1970, the CIA was informed of another plot to overthrow the Ba'athist government, which was being organized by Shia dissidents.

== 1972–1975: Kurdish intervention ==
In the aftermath of the March Accord, Iranian and Israeli officials tried to persuade the Nixon administration that the agreement was part of a Soviet plot to free up Iraq's military for aggression against Iran and Israel, but U.S. officials refuted these claims by noting that Iraq had resumed purging ICP members on March 23, 1970, and that Saddam was met with a "chilly" reception during his visit to Moscow on August 4–12, during which he requested deferment on Iraq's considerable foreign debt. Iraqi–Soviet relations improved rapidly in late 1971 in response to the Soviet Union's deteriorating alliance with Egyptian leader Anwar Sadat, who succeeded Nasser following the latter's death on September 28, 1970.

However, even after Iraq signed a secret arms deal with the Soviets in September 1971, which was finalized during Soviet Defense Minister Andrei Grechko's December trip to Baghdad and "brought the total of Soviet military aid to Iraq to above the $750 million level," the State Department remained skeptical that Iraq posed any threat to Iran. On April 9, 1972, Soviet Prime Minister Alexei Kosygin signed "a 15-year treaty of friendship and cooperation" with Bakr, but U.S. officials were not "outwardly perturbed" by this development, because, according to the NSC staff, it was not "surprising or sudden but rather a culmination of existing relationships."

It has been suggested that Nixon was initially preoccupied with pursuing his policy of détente with the Soviet Union and with the May 1972 Moscow Summit, but later sought to assuage the Shah's concerns about Iraq during his May 30–31 trip to Tehran. In a May 31 meeting with the Shah, Nixon vowed that the U.S. "would not let down [its] friends," promising to provide Iran with sophisticated weapons ("including F-14s and F-15s") to counter the Soviet Union's agreement to sell Iraq Mig-23 jets. According to Nixon's National Security Adviser and later Secretary of State, Henry Kissinger, and numerous scholars, Nixon also agreed to a covert operation to assist the KDP while in Tehran. (Barzani had resumed his alliance with Iran and Israel after a December 1970 assassination attempt on his son Idris, which he held the Ba'ath Party responsible for.) There is, however, no official record that this occurred, with the only record that Nixon approved the operation being an August 1 memo from Kissinger to 40 Committee principals. It is therefore plausible that two additional factors ultimately convinced Nixon to approve the operation, despite widespread opposition to supporting the Kurds within the State Department and CIA: Iraq's complete nationalization of the IPC on June 1, after Iraq began exporting oil from North Rumaila to the Soviet Union in April; and the July 18 withdrawal of 15,000 Soviet military personnel from Egypt, which Kissinger's deputy, General Alexander Haig, predicted on July 28 "will probably result in more intense Soviet efforts in Iraq."

From October 1972 until the abrupt end of the Kurdish intervention after March 1975, the CIA "provided the Kurds with nearly $20 million in assistance," including 1,250 tons of non-attributable weaponry. The main goal of U.S. policy-makers was to increase the Kurds's ability to negotiate a reasonable autonomy agreement with the government of Iraq. To justify the operation, U.S. officials cited Iraq's support for international terrorism and its repeated threats against neighboring states, including Iran (where Iraq supported Baluchi and Arab separatists against the Shah) and Kuwait (Iraq launched an unprovoked attack on a Kuwaiti border post and claimed the Kuwaiti islands of Warbah and Bubiyan in May 1973), with Haig remarking: "There can be no doubt that it is in the interest of ourselves, our allies, and other friendly governments in the area to see the Ba'thi regime in Iraq kept off balance and if possible overthrown." After Nixon's resignation in August 1974, President Gerald Ford was briefed about the Kurdish intervention on a "need-to-know" basis—leaving Kissinger, former CIA director and ambassador to Iran Richard Helms, Arthur Callahan (chief of the CIA Station in Tehran), and Callahan's deputy—to actually implement the U.S. policy.

To prevent leaks, the State Department was not informed of the operation. In fact, the State Department had dispatched Arthur Lowrie to establish a U.S. Interests Section in Baghdad shortly prior to Nixon's decision to support the Kurds; the Interests Section officially opened on October 1, 1972. Lowrie repeatedly warned that there was a power struggle between moderates and extremists within the Iraqi Ba'ath Party, and that the Shah's aggressive posture towards Iraq, combined with the Ba'ath Party's belief that the U.S. sought to overthrow it, empowered the extremists while forcing Iraq to turn towards the Soviet Union for arms resupply. Helms and the CIA rejected Lowrie's analysis and his proposal that the U.S. try to improve relations with Iraq, with Helms stating "[We] are frankly skeptical that in practice we could help the moderates without building up our extremist enemies." The CIA went further, producing a report that cautioned "the level of political violence is very high ... This is not a happy situation nor a happy government for the US to try to do business with." After a failed coup attempt on June 30, 1973, Saddam consolidated control over Iraq and made a number of positive gestures towards the U.S. and the West, such as refusing to participate in the Saudi-led oil embargo following the Yom Kippur War, but these actions were largely ignored in Washington.

On March 11, 1974, the Iraqi government gave Barzani 15 days to accept a new autonomy law, which "fell far short of what the regime had promised the Kurds in 1970, including long-standing demands like a proportional share of oil revenue and the inclusion of the oil-rich and culturally significant city of Kirkuk into the autonomous region" and "gave the regime a veto over any Kurdish legislation." Barzani allowed the deadline to lapse, triggering the outbreak of the Second Iraqi–Kurdish War in April. Although the CIA had stockpiled "900,000 pounds of non-attributable small arms and ammunition" to prepare for this contingency, the Kurds were in a weak position due to their lack of anti-aircraft and anti-tank weapons. Moreover, Soviet advisers contributed to a change in Iraq's tactics that decisively altered the trajectory of the war, allowing the Iraqi army to finally achieve steady gains against the Kurds where it had failed in the past. To prevent a collapse of the Kurdish resistance, Kissinger negotiated a deal with Israel to provide the Kurds with $28 million in heavy weaponry, but all assistance came to a sudden end shortly after the Shah and Saddam embraced one another at a press conference in Algiers on March 6, 1975: Saddam had agreed to a concession on the border of the Shatt al-Arab waterway in return for an end to "all subversive infiltration from either side." The increasingly overt Iranian involvement necessary to stave off a Kurdish defeat—including the presence of Iranian soldiers dressed in Kurdish uniforms, who participated in combat for as long as 10 days at a time, thus raising the possibility that further escalation might lead to "open war" between Iran and Iraq—combined with assurances from Arab leaders including Sadat, King Hussein, and Algeria's Houari Boumédiène that "Saddam Hussein was ready to pull Iraq out of [the] Soviet orbit if Iran would take away the [Kurdish revolt] which was forcing them into the arms of the Soviets"—also helped convince the Shah that an accommodation with Iraq was necessary and desirable. In the aftermath, over 100,000 Kurds fled to Iran, while the Iraqi government brutally consolidated its control over Iraqi Kurdistan—destroying as many as 1,400 villages by 1978, imprisoning 600,000 Kurds in resettlement camps, and ultimately waging a campaign of genocide against the Kurds in 1988.

A leaked Congressional investigation led by Otis G. Pike and a February 4, 1976 The New York Times article written by William Safire have heavily influenced subsequent scholarship regarding the conduct of the Kurdish intervention. As a result, there is a widespread belief that U.S. officials prodded Barzani into rejecting the Iraqi government's initial offer of autonomy, cynically agreed to "sell out" the Kurds at the Shah's behest, refused to provide any humanitarian assistance for Kurdish refugees, and failed to respond to "a heartbreaking letter" Barzani sent Kissinger on March 10, 1975, in which he stated: "Our movement and people are being destroyed in an unbelievable way with silence from everyone." In fact, declassified documents reveal that U.S. officials warned Barzani against his proposal to declare autonomy unilaterally, as they knew doing so would provoke the Iraqi government, even as the goal of permanently dividing Iraq and maintaining an autonomous Kurdish government would require massive resources irreconcilable with plausible deniability. However, Barzani could never have accepted Iraq's "watered-down autonomy law," as it was inconsistent with the terms of the March Accord and ignored outstanding Kurdish demands. The Shah's "sell-out" blindsided American and Israeli officials, as well as his own advisers; Kissinger had personally lobbied the Shah against reaching any agreement with Iraq, and questioned the logic of "trad[ing] a valuable coercive asset ... for a modest border concession." The U.S. provided $1 million in aid to Kurdish refugees—and, on March 17, Kissinger responded to Barzani's letter: "We can understand that the difficult decisions which the Kurdish people now face are a cause of deep anguish for them. We have great admiration for the courage and dignity with which those people have confronted many trials, and our prayers are with them." With neither Iran nor Turkey willing to allow their territory to be used to support the Kurds, the U.S. and Israel were forced to abandon their assistance.

According to Gibson, "The Pike Report ignored inconvenient truths; misattributed quotes; falsely accused the United States of not providing the Kurds with any humanitarian assistance; and, finally, claimed that Kissinger had not responded to Barzani's tragic plea, when in fact he had ... This was not the 'textbook case of betrayal and skulduggery' that the Pike Report had led many people to believe." Gibson concedes that U.S. involvement was self-serving and "advanced America's Cold War interests, though not entirely at the expense of the Kurds." Joost Hiltermann offers a contrasting analysis: "The exoneration shouldn't go unqualified. Kissinger cared for the Kurds only to the extent that they could be used in the pursuit of US interests, and he would surely have abandoned them sooner or later."

== 1979: Cave's warning to Tehran ==
Longtime CIA officer George W. Cave met with the Iranian Deputy Prime Minister Abbas Amir-Entezam and Foreign Minister Ebrahim Yazdi on October 15, 1979 as part of an intelligence-sharing liaison approved by Assistant Secretary of State for Near Eastern Affairs Harold H. Saunders; this preceded the initiation of the Iran hostage crisis on November 4. Cave told Mark J. Gasiorowski that he "warned Iran's leaders of Iraqi invasion preparations and told them how they could monitor these preparations and thus take steps to counter them." However, while Entezam and Yazdi corroborated Cave's account of the briefing, neither man seems to have shared this information with other Iranian officials, perhaps out of fear that their relationship with a CIA officer would be misconstrued. Owing largely to extensive post–revolutionary purges of its armed forces, Iran was in fact grossly unprepared for Iraq's invasion of Iran in September 1980. The veracity of the underlying intelligence supporting Cave's warning, and its implications with regard to allegations that the U.S. gave Saddam a "green-light" to invade Iran, have been debated. Gasiorowski contended that "If Iran's leaders had acted on the information provided in Cave's briefings ... the brutal eight–year [Iran–Iraq War] might never have occurred."

== 1982: U.S. "tilts" toward Baghdad ==
On July 27, 1982, at the direction of the Reagan administration's NSC, Thomas Twetten arrived in Baghdad to share CIA satellite imagery on Iranian troop movements with the Iraqi Mukhabarat. This was "the first U.S. provision of intelligence to Iraq" during the Iran–Iraq War, and sparked a short-lived debate over whether Iraq would tolerate a CIA presence in the country: Mukhabarat head Barzan Tikriti told Twetten to "get the hell out of Iraq," but Iraqi military intelligence—"having already drooled over it and having said repeatedly how valuable it was"—subsequently informed Twetten, "we'll continue to look at your information, and we'll assess whether it is of use to us in any way." This intelligence may have played a crucial role in blocking the Iranian invasion of Iraq in 1982. According to Twetten: "One of our officers met one of the Iraqi military intelligence officers in Kurdistan about three years ago. He said that the intelligence we provided to them made all the difference. It prevented an Iraqi collapse."

== 1984: Mukhabarat liaison ==
In 1984, the CIA "established a formal intelligence liaison" with the Mukhabarat, which provided the CIA with information on terrorist groups including the Abu Nidal Organization. However, there was a delay between the CIA's provision of intelligence to the Mukhabarat and that intelligence being received and analyzed by the Iraqi military, which resulted in much of it not being actionable. Therefore, the CIA eventually began working directly with Iraqi military intelligence, thereby negating its leverage on Iraqi-sponsored terrorism.

== 1991: Gulf War ==
The CIA provided intelligence support to the U.S. military in Operation Desert Shield and Operation Desert Storm.

Mohammed Abdullah Shawani's "saga illustrates a little-understood part of the Iraq story—the CIA's attempt to mobilize Iraqi officers [against Hussein's regime]. At the center was Shahwani, a Sunni from Mosul and a charismatic commander who made his reputation in 1984 with a helicopter assault on Iranian troops atop a mountain in Iraqi Kurdistan. His popularity made him dangerous to Saddam Hussein, and he was arrested and interrogated in 1989. He fled the country in May 1990, just before Iraq invaded Kuwait." In 1991, Shahwani began efforts to organize a military coup utilizing former members of the special forces, which Hussein had disbanded.

== 1992 ==
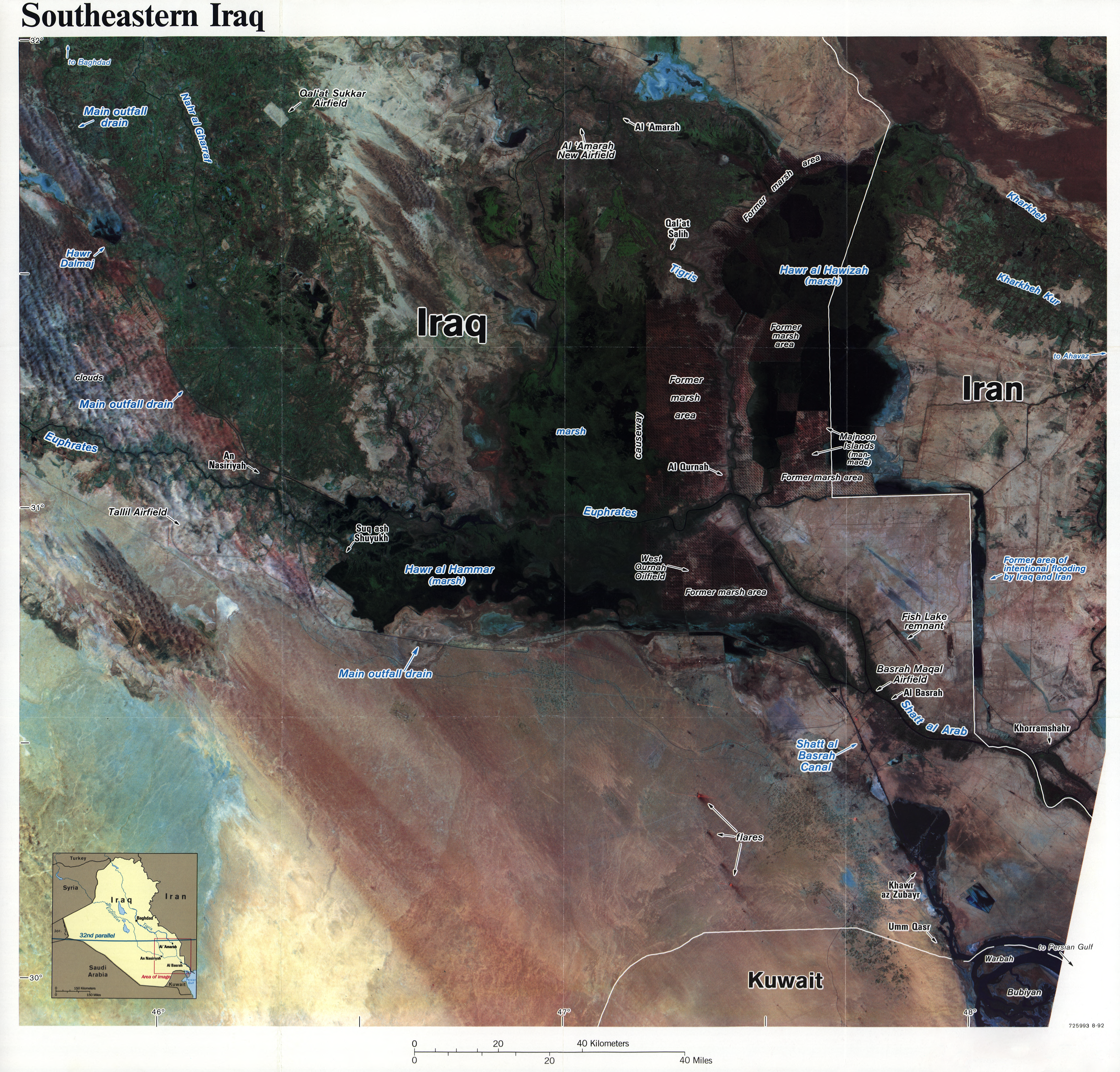
A 1992 CIA map of southeastern Iraq with oilfields, airfields, and other strategic locations identified.

After the Gulf War, CIA took steps to correct the shortcomings identified during the Gulf War and improve its support to the US military, beginning improved communications with major US military commands. In 1992, CIA created the Office of Military Affairs (OMA) to enhance cooperation and increase information flow between the CIA and the military. OMA is subordinate to the Associate Director of Central Intelligence for Military Support and is jointly staffed by CIA officers from all directorates and military personnel from all the services.

According to former U.S. intelligence officials interviewed by The New York Times, the CIA indirectly supported a bomb and sabotage campaign between 1992 and 1995 in Iraq conducted by the Iraqi National Accord insurgents, led by Iyad Allawi. The campaign had no apparent effect in toppling Saddam Hussein's rule.

According to former CIA officer Robert Baer, various rebel groups were attempting to oust Hussein at the time. No public records of the CIA campaign are known to exist, and former U.S. officials said their recollections were in many cases sketchy, and in some cases contradictory. "But whether the bombings actually killed any civilians could not be confirmed because, as a former CIA official said, the United States had no significant intelligence sources in Iraq then." In 1996, Amneh al-Khadami, who described himself as the chief bomb maker for the Iraqi National Accord, recorded a videotape in which he talked of the bombing campaign and complained that he was being shortchanged money and supplies. Two former intelligence officers confirmed the existence of the videotape. Mr. Khadami said that "we blew up a car, and we were supposed to get $2,000" but got only $1,000, as reported in 1997 by the British newspaper The Independent, which had obtained a copy of the videotape. The campaign was directed by CIA asset Dr. Iyad Allawi, later installed as interim prime minister by the U.S.-led coalition that invaded Iraq in 2003.

== 1993 ==
Funding Kurdish organizations, the CIA worked to create a new Kurdish-led intelligence agency in Iraq called Asayesh (Kurdish for "security").

== 1994 ==
After Saddam had been deposed in 2003, U.S. and Iraqi sources provided an account of the unsuccessful strategy of deposing Saddam by a coup d'état during the 1990s, an effort reportedly known within CIA by the cryptonym "DBACHILLES".

According to The Washington Post, the CIA appointed a new head of its Near East Division, Stephen Richter, who assumed that large parts of the Iraqi army might support a coup. A team met with Gen. Mohammed Abdullah Shawani, a former commander of Iraqi Special Forces, and a Turkmen from Mosul. As the CIA was drafting its plans, the British encouraged the agency to contact an experienced Iraqi exile named Ayad Alawi, who headed a network of current and former Iraqi military officers and Ba'ath Party operatives known as wifaq, the Arabic word for "trust."

== 1996: Failed coup against Saddam ==
The CIA was involved in the failed 1996 coup against Saddam Hussein.

== 2002 ==
CIA Special Activities Division (SAD) paramilitary teams were the first teams in Iraq arriving in July 2002. Once on the ground they prepared the battle space for the subsequent arrival of US military forces. SAD teams then combined with US Army Special Forces (on a team called the Northern Iraq Liaison Element or NILE). This team organized the Kurdish Peshmerga for the subsequent US-led invasion. They combined to defeat Ansar al-Islam, an ally of Al-Qaeda. They operated on the belief that failure would have created a considerable hostile force behind the US/Kurdish force in the subsequent assault on Saddam's Army. The US side was carried out by Paramilitary Operations Officers from SAD/SOG and the Army's 10th Special Forces Group.

SAD teams also conducted high risk special reconnaissance missions behind Iraqi lines to identify senior leadership targets. These missions led to the initial strikes against Saddam Hussein and his key generals. Although the initial strike against Hussein was unsuccessful in killing the dictator, it was successful in effectively ending his ability to command and control his forces. Other strikes against key generals were successful and significantly degraded the command's ability to react to and maneuver against the US-led invasion force.

NATO member Turkey refused to allow its territory to be used by the US Army's 4th Infantry Division for the invasion. As a result, the SAD, US Army Special Forces joint teams and the Kurdish Peshmerga were the entire northern force against Saddam's Army during the invasion. Their efforts kept the 1st and 5th Corps of the Iraqi Army in place to defend against the Kurds rather than their moving to contest the coalition force coming from the south. This combined US Special Operations and Kurdish force soundly defeated Saddam's Army, a major military success, similar to the victory over the Taliban in Afghanistan. Four members of the SAD/SOG team received the CIA's rare Intelligence Star for their "heroic actions".

== 2003: Iraq War; WMD rationale under scrutiny ==
U.S. intelligence on Iraqi weapons of mass destruction (WMD) had been the focus of intense scrutiny in the U.S. Successive chronological entries deal with the resistance in Iraq.

Richard Kerr, a 32-year CIA veteran who served three years as deputy director for intelligence, was commissioned to lead a review of agency analysis of Iraqi WMD claims, and produced a series of reports, one of which is unclassified. Kerr told journalist Robert Dreyfuss that CIA analysts felt intimidated by the Bush administration, saying, "A lot of analysts believed that they were being pressured to come to certain conclusions … . I talked to a lot of people who said, 'There was a lot of repetitive questioning. We were being asked to justify what we were saying again and again.' There were certainly people who felt they were being pushed beyond the evidence they had."

In a January 26, 2006 interview, Kerr acknowledged this had resulted in open antagonism between some in the CIA and the Bush White House, saying, "There have been more leaks and discussions outside what I would consider to be the appropriate level than I've ever seen before. And I think that lack of discipline is a real problem. I don't think an intelligence organization can kind of take up arms against politics, or a policy-maker. I think that will not work, and it won't stand."

Evidence against Iraq having a WMD program included information from CIA officer Valerie Plame, who, in a July 14, 2003 The Washington Post newspaper column by Robert Novak, was identified publicly as "an agency operative on weapons of mass destruction."

Plame's husband, Ambassador Joseph C. Wilson IV had been sent by CIA to the African nation of Niger to investigate claims that Iraq intended to purchase uranium yellowcake from that country, which was incorporated in President George W. Bush's 2003 State of the Union address to support waging a preventive war against Iraq. See Iraq 2007 investigations for the aftermath of this claims and disclosures about them.

Kenneth Pollack, a former National Security Council expert on Iraq, who generally supported the use of force to remove Saddam Hussein, told Seymour Hersh that what the Bush administration did was

"... dismantle the existing filtering process that for fifty years had been preventing the policymakers from getting bad information. They created stovepipes to get the information they wanted directly to the top leadership.... They always had information to back up their public claims, but it was often very bad information," Pollack said.

Some of the information used to justify the U.S. invasion of Iraq came from a discredited informant codenamed "Curveball" by CIA, who falsely claimed that he had worked as a chemical engineer at a plant that manufactured mobile biological weapon laboratories as part of an Iraqi weapons of mass destruction program. Despite warnings to CIA from the German Federal Intelligence Service regarding the authenticity of his claims, they were incorporated into President Bush's 2003 State of the Union address and Colin Powell's subsequent presentation to the UN Security Council.

=== Capture of Saddam Hussein ===
The mission that captured Saddam Hussein was called "Operation Red Dawn". It was planned and carried out by the JSOC's Delta Force and SAD/SOG teams (together called Task Force 121). The operation eventually included around 600 soldiers from the 1st Brigade of the 4th Infantry Division. Special operations troops probably numbered around 40. Much of the publicity and credit for the capture went to the 4th Infantry Division soldiers, but CIA and JSOC were the driving force. "Task Force 121 were actually the ones who pulled Saddam out of the hole" said Robert Andrews, former deputy assistant Secretary of Defense for special operations and low-intensity conflict. "They can't be denied a role anymore."

== 2004 ==
The lack of finding WMD, the continuing armed resistance against the U.S. military occupation of Iraq, and the widely perceived need for a systematic review of the respective roles of the CIA, the FBI, and the Defense Intelligence Agency.

On July 9, 2004, the Senate Report of Pre-war Intelligence on Iraq of the Senate Intelligence Committee reported that the CIA exaggerated the alleged danger presented by weapons of mass destruction in Iraq, an accusation largely unsupported by the available intelligence.

=== New Iraqi intelligence forms ===
In February 2004, the new Iraqi National Intelligence Service, or INIS, was established in February 2004 "as a nonsectarian force that would recruit its officers and agents from all of Iraq's religious communities. Its chief, Gen. Mohammed Shahwani, is a Sunni from Mosul. He is married to a Shiite and his deputy is a Kurd. Shahwani, a commander of Iraqi special forces during the Iran–Iraq War, has worked closely with the CIA for more than a decade – first in trying to topple Saddam Hussein, then in trying to build an effective intelligence organization."

There is a competing intelligence service "called the Ministry of Security, was created last year under the direction of Sheerwan al-Waeli. He is a former colonel in the Iraqi army who served in Nasiriyah under the old regime. He is said to have received training in Iran and to be maintaining regular liaison with Iranian and Syrian intelligence officers in Baghdad. His service, like Shahwani's organization, has about 5,000 officers."

The CIA had hoped that Shahwani's INIS could be an effective national force and a deterrent to Iranian meddling. To mount effective operations against the Iranians, Shahwani recruited the chief of the Iran branch of the Saddam Hussein-era Mukhabarat. That made the Iranians and their Shiite allies nervous.

Shahwani's operatives discovered in 2004 that the Iranians had a hit list, drawn from an old Defense Ministry payroll document that identified the names and home addresses of senior officers who served under the former regime. Shahwani himself was among those targeted for assassination by the Iranians. To date, about 140 officers in the INIS have been killed.

Though many in Maliki's government regard Shahwani with suspicion, his supporters say he has tried to remain independent of the sectarian battles in Iraq. He has provided intelligence that has led to the capture of several senior al-Qaeda operatives, according to U.S. sources, as well as regular intelligence about the Sunni insurgency. Several months ago, Shahwani informed Maliki of an assassination plot by a bodyguard who secretly worked for Shiite militia leader Moqtada al-Sadr. Shahwani's service uncovered a similar plot to assassinate Iraq's deputy prime minister, Barham Salih, a Kurd.

Shahwani's coup plans suffered a setback in June 1996, when the Mukhabarat killed 85 of his operatives, including three of his sons. But he continued plotting over the next seven years, and on the eve of the American invasion in March 2003, Shahwani and his CIA supporters were still hoping to organize an uprising among the Iraqi military. Shahwani's secret Iraqi network was known as "77 Alpha," and later as "the Scorpions."

The Pentagon was wary of the Iraqi uprising plan, so it was shelved, but Shahwani encouraged his network in the Iraqi military not to fight—in the expectation that the soldiers would be well treated after the American victory. Then came the disastrous decision in May 2003 by L. Paul Bremer and the Coalition Provisional Authority to disband the Iraqi military and cut off its pay. The rest, as they say, is history.

Instead of the one good intelligence service it needs, Iraq today has two—one pro-Iranian, the other anti-Iranian. That's a measure of where the country is: caught between feuding sects and feuding neighbors, with a superpower ally that can't seem to help its friends or stop its enemies.

=== Abu Ghraib ===
Also in 2004, reports of Abu Ghraib torture and prisoner abuse surfaced. In the subsequent investigation by MG Antonio Taguba, he stated, "I find that contrary to the provision of AR 190-8, and the findings found in MG Ryder's Report, Military Intelligence (MI) interrogators and Other US Government Agency's (OGA) interrogators actively requested that MP guards set physical and mental conditions for favorable interrogation of witnesses." OGA is a common euphemism for the CIA. Further, "The various detention facilities operated by the 800th MP Brigade have routinely held persons brought to them by Other Government Agencies (OGAs) without accounting for them, knowing their identities, or even the reason for their detention. The Joint Interrogation and Debriefing Center (JIDC) at Abu Ghraib called these detainees 'ghost detainees.' On at least one occasion, the 320th MP Battalion at Abu Ghraib held a handful of "ghost detainees" (6–8) for OGAs that they moved around within the facility to hide them from a visiting International Committee of the Red Cross (ICRC) survey team. This maneuver was deceptive, contrary to Army Doctrine, and in violation of international law."

At the Abu Ghraib prison, a prisoner named Manadel al-Jamadi died.

== 2006 ==
Tyler Drumheller, a 26-year CIA veteran and former head of covert operations in Europe, told CBS News 60 Minutes correspondent Ed Bradley in an April 23, 2006 interview that there was widespread disbelief within the agency about the Bush administration's public claims regarding Iraqi weapons of mass destruction. According to Drumheller, the CIA had penetrated Saddam Hussein's inner circle in the fall of 2002, and this high-level source told CIA "they had no active weapons of mass destruction program." Asked by Bradley about the apparent contradiction with Bush administration statements regarding Iraqi WMDs at that time, Drumheller said, "The policy was set. The war in Iraq was coming. And they were looking for intelligence to fit into the policy, to justify the policy."

== 2007–2008 ==
As of June 2007, "Shahwani is now in the United States. Unless he receives assurances of support from Maliki's government, he is likely to resign, which would plunge the INIS into turmoil and could bring about its collapse.

=== 2007 investigations ===
The disclosure of Mrs. Wilson's then-still-classified covert CIA identity as "Valerie Plame" led to a grand jury investigation and the subsequent indictment and conviction of Vice President Cheney's former chief of staff, Lewis Libby, on charges of perjury, obstruction of justice, and making false statements to federal investigators.

=== "The Surge" ===
CIA paramilitary units continued to team up with the JSOC in Iraq and in 2007 the combination created a lethal force many credit with having a major impact in the success of "the Surge". They did this by killing or capturing many of the key al-Qaeda leaders in Iraq. In a 60 Minutes interview, Pulitzer Prize-winning journalist Bob Woodward described a new special operations capability that allowed for this success. This capability was developed by the joint teams of CIA and JSOC. Several senior U.S. officials stated that the "joint efforts of JSOC and CIA paramilitary units was the most significant contributor to the defeat of al-Qaeda in Iraq".

On October 26, 2008, CIA's Special Activities Division Special Operations Group (SAD/SOG) and JSOC conducted an operation in Ba'athist Syria targeting the "foreign fighter logistics network" bringing al-Qaeda operatives into Iraq (See 2008 Abu Kamal raid). A U.S. source told CBS News that "the leader of the foreign fighters, an al-Qaeda officer, was the target of Sunday's cross-border raid." He said the attack was successful, but did not say whether or not the al-Qaeda officer was killed. Fox News later reported that Abu Ghadiya, "al-Qa'ida's senior coordinator operating in Syria", was killed in the attack. The New York Times reported that during the raid U.S. forces killed several armed males who "posed a threat".

== See also ==
- Iraq–United States relations
- Operation Avarice
- JSOC Task Force in the Iraq War
- U.S. list of most-wanted Iraqis

== Bibliography ==
- Gibson, Bryan R. (2015). Sold Out? US Foreign Policy, Iraq, the Kurds, and the Cold War. Palgrave Macmillan. ISBN 978-1-137-48711-7.
- Citino, Nathan J. (2017). "The People's Court". Envisioning the Arab Future: Modernization in US-Arab Relations, 1945–1967. Cambridge University Press. ISBN 9781108107556.
