= Iraq–United States relations =

- Iraq: United States

Diplomatic mission
- Iraqi Embassy, Washington, D.C.: United States Embassy, Baghdad

Diplomatic relations between Iraq and the United States began when the U.S. first recognized Iraq on January 9, 1930, with the signing of the Anglo-American-Iraqi Convention in London by Charles G. Dawes, U.S. ambassador to the United Kingdom. The historiography of Iraq—United States relations prior to the 1980s is considered relatively underdeveloped, with the first in-depth academic studies being published in the 2010s. Today, the United States and Iraq both consider themselves as strategic partners, given the American political and military involvement after the invasion of Iraq and their mutual, deep-rooted relationship that followed. The United States provides the Iraqi security forces hundreds of millions of dollars of military aid and training annually as well as uses its military bases.

In January 2020, Iraq voted to ask the U.S. and its coalition members to withdraw all of their troops from the country after the assassinations of Iranian major general Qasem Soleimani (the second most powerful figure in Iran) and PMF commander Abu Mahdi al-Muhandis (one of Iraq's most powerful men). Following the vote, U.S. president Donald Trump initially refused to withdraw from Iraq, but began withdrawing forces in March 2020. On 26 July 2021, U.S. president Joe Biden announced that the American combat mission in Iraq would conclude by the end of 2021 and the remaining U.S. troops in the country would shift to an advisory role.

== History ==
=== Ottoman Empire ===
American commercial interaction with the Ottoman Empire (which included the area that later became modern Iraq) began in the late 18th century. In 1831, Chargé d'Affaires David Porter became the first American diplomat in the Ottoman Empire, at the capital city of Constantinople. With the dissolution of the Ottoman Empire after World War I, the United States supported Great Britain's administration of Iraq as a mandate, but insisted that it be groomed for independence, rather than remain a colony. U.S. first became involved in Iraq in the 1920s as part of an effort to secure a role for American companies in Iraq's emerging oil industry. As part of the 1928 Red Line Agreement, UK, US, France and the Netherlands effectively agreed to share out Iraq's oil, with American oil companies gaining a 23.75 percent ownership share of the Iraq Petroleum Company.

=== U.S. recognizes Iraq ===
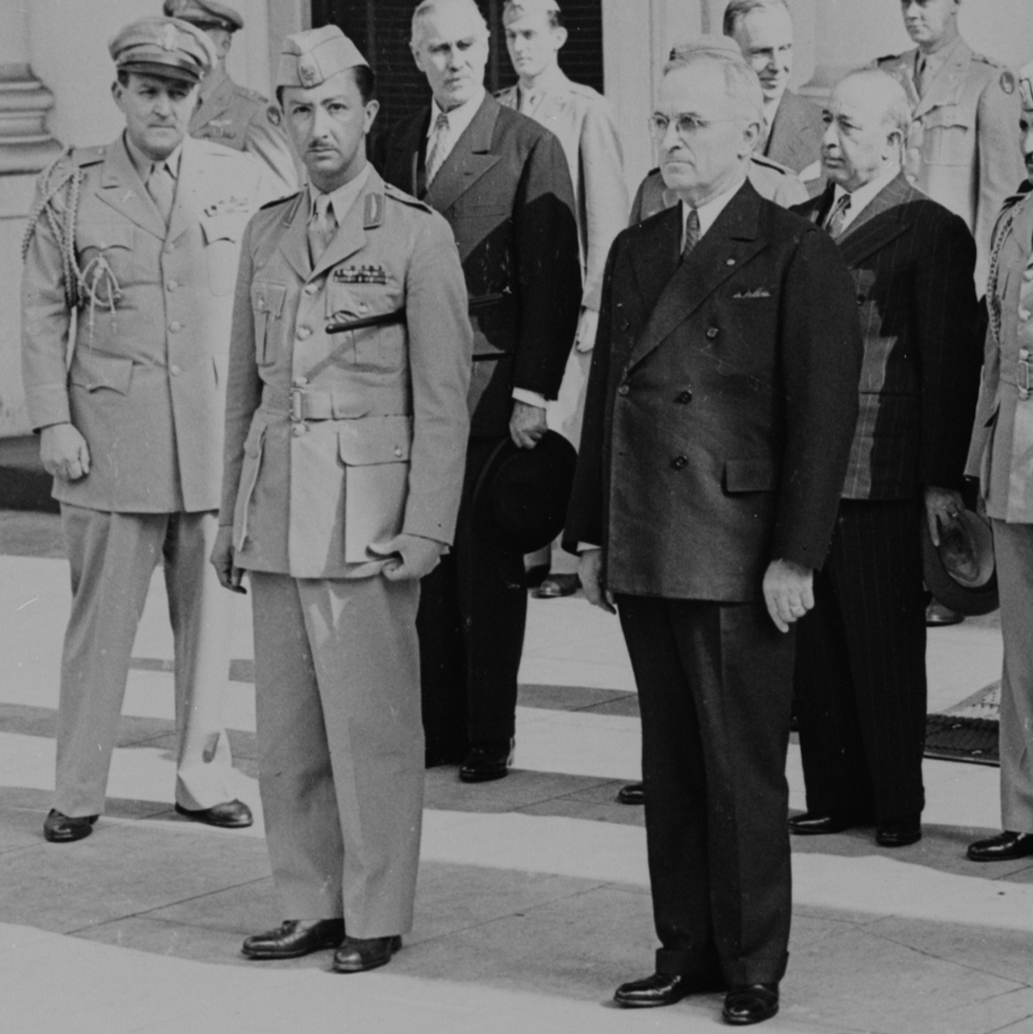
Abd al-Ilah (left), Regent of Iraq, with U.S. President Harry S. Truman at the White House in 1945

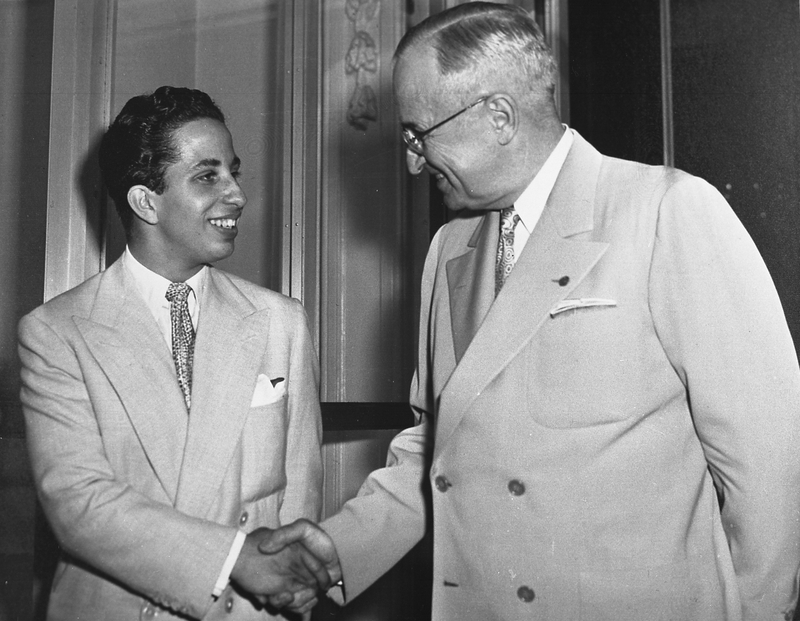
President Truman (right) greeting King Faisal II of Iraq at the White House in 1952

The U.S. recognized Iraq on January 9, 1930, when Charles G. Dawes, U.S. ambassador to the United Kingdom, signed the Anglo-American-Iraqi Convention in London. According to the preamble of the convention, "the United States of America recognizes Iraq as an independent State." In this treaty, the U.S. also acknowledged that "special relations" existed between the U.K. and Iraq because the latter was a mandate under British protection according to the Treaty of Versailles. In 1932, Iraq terminated its mandate status. Diplomatic relations and the American Legation in Iraq were established on March 30, 1931, when Alexander K. Sloan (then serving as Consul in Iraq) was appointed Chargé d'Affaires of the American Legation at Baghdad. In early 1941, the United States, not yet engaged in the war and only peripherally involved in the Middle East, had not developed a clear and coherent policy toward Iraq. Nevertheless, the U.S. played a significant role in the events leading to the overthrow of Rashid Ali, the Iraqi prime minister (1933, 1940–41) as the British saw him as an Arab nationalist, and preferred Iraq to be ruled by a more 'pro-British' leader. The U.S. upgraded its diplomatic representation in Iraq from a Legation to an Embassy on December 28, 1946.

=== Arab Union ===
On May 28, 1958, the U.S. recognized the Arab Union that formed between Iraq and the Hashemite Kingdom of Jordan. U.S. recognition of the new state was accorded in an exchange of notes between the American Embassy at Baghdad and the Ministry of Foreign Affairs of the Arab Union. In announcing U.S. recognition, the Department of State noted that the Arab Union's constitution stipulated that "external affairs will remain as they are at the present time" with the two Kingdoms that had joined to form the new state. Consequently, formal diplomatic relations were not established between the U.S. and the Arab Union, and diplomatic relations continued uninterrupted between the U.S. and Iraq, and the U.S. and Jordan.

=== Relations with Qasim's government, 1958–1963 ===
Relations between the U.S. and Iraq became strained following the overthrow of the Iraqi monarchy on July 14, 1958, which resulted in the declaration of a republican government led by Brigadier Abd al-Karim Qasim. Concerned about the influence of Iraqi Communist Party (ICP) members in Qasim's administration, and hoping to prevent "Ba'athist or Communist exploitation of the situation," President Dwight D. Eisenhower had established a Special Committee on Iraq (SCI) in April 1959 to monitor events and propose various contingencies for preventing a communist takeover of the country. Qasim undertook numerous repressive measures against the communists throughout 1960, and this—combined with the John F. Kennedy administration's belief that Iraq was not important to the broader Cold War—resulted in the disestablishment of the SCI within days of Kennedy's inauguration as president. However, subsequent events would return Iraq to the attention of American officials.

On June 25, 1961, Qasim mobilized troops along the Iraq–Kuwait border, declaring the latter nation "an indivisible part of Iraq" and causing a short-lived "Kuwait Crisis." The U.K.—which had just granted Kuwait independence on June 19 and whose economy was heavily dependent on Kuwaiti oil supplies—responded on July 1 by dispatching 5,000 troops to the country to deter any Iraqi invasion. At the same time, Kennedy briefly dispatched a U.S. Navy task force to Bahrain, and the U.K. (at the urging of the Kennedy administration) brought the dispute to United Nations Security Council, where the proposed resolution was vetoed by the Soviet Union. The situation was finally resolved in October, when the British troops were withdrawn and replaced by a 4,000-strong Arab League force. The Kennedy administration's initially "low-key" response to the stand-off was motivated by the desire to project an image of the U.S. as "a progressive anti-colonial power trying to work productively with Arab nationalism" as well as the preference of U.S. officials to defer to the U.K. on issues related to the Persian Gulf.

Following Kurdish leader Mustafa Barzani's 1958 return to Iraq from exile in the Soviet Union, Qasim had promised to permit autonomous rule in the Kurdish region of northern Iraq, but by 1961 Qasim had made no progress towards achieving this goal. In July 1961, following months of violence between feuding Kurdish tribes, Barzani returned to northern Iraq and began retaking territory from his Kurdish rivals. Although Qasim's government did not respond to the escalating violence, the Kurdistan Democratic Party (KDP) sent Qasim a list of demands in August, which included the withdrawal of Iraqi government troops from Kurdish territory and greater political freedom. For the next month, U.S. officials in Iran and Iraq predicted that a war was imminent. Faced with the loss of northern Iraq after non-Barzani Kurds seized control of a key road leading to the Iran–Iraq border in early September and ambushed and massacred Iraqi troops on September 10 and September 12, Qasim finally ordered the systematic bombing of Kurdish villages on September 14, which caused Barzani to join the rebellion on September 19. As part of a strategy devised by Alexander Shelepin in July 1961 to distract the U.S. and its allies from the Soviet Union's aggressive posture in Berlin, the Soviet KGB revived its connections with Barzani and encouraged him to revolt, although Barzani had no intention to act as their proxy. By March 1962, Barzani's forces were in firm control of Iraqi Kurdistan, although Barzani refrained from taking major cities out of fear that the Iraqi government would launch reprisals against civilians. The U.S. refused Kurdish requests for assistance, but Qasim nevertheless castigated the Kurds as "American stooges" while absolving the Soviets of any responsibility for the unrest.

In December 1961, Qasim's government passed Public Law 80, which restricted the British- and American-owned Iraq Petroleum Company (IPC)'s concessionary holding to those areas in which oil was actually being produced, effectively expropriating 99.5% of the IPC concession. U.S. officials were alarmed by the expropriation as well as the recent Soviet veto of an Egyptian-sponsored UN resolution requesting the admittance of Kuwait as a UN member state, which they believed to be connected. Senior National Security Council (NSC) adviser Robert Komer worried that if the IPC ceased production in response, Qasim might "grab Kuwait" (thus achieving a "stranglehold" on Middle Eastern oil production) or "throw himself into Russian arms." At the same time, Komer made note of widespread rumors that a nationalist coup against Qasim could be imminent, and had the potential to "get Iraq back on [a] more neutral keel." Following Komer's advice, on December 30 Kennedy's National Security Advisor McGeorge Bundy sent the president a cable from the U.S. ambassador to Iraq, John Jernegan, which argued that the U.S. was "in grave danger [of] being drawn into [a] costly and politically disastrous situation over Kuwait." Bundy also requested Kennedy's permission to "press State" to consider measures to resolve the situation with Iraq, adding that cooperation with the British was desirable "if possible, but our own interests, oil and other, are very directly involved."

In April 1962, the State Department issued new guidelines on Iraq that were intended to increase American influence in the country. Around the same time, Kennedy instructed the Central Intelligence Agency (CIA)—under the direction of Archie Roosevelt Jr.—to begin making preparations for a military coup against Qasim. On June 2, Iraqi Foreign Minister Hashim Jawad ordered Jernegan to leave the country, stating that Iraq was also withdrawing its ambassador from Washington in retaliation for the U.S. accepting the credentials of a new Kuwaiti ambassador on June 1, which Iraq had repeatedly warned would result in a downgrading of diplomatic relations. Despite the Iraqi warnings, senior U.S. officials were stunned by the downgrade; Kennedy had not been informed of the likely consequences of accepting the Kuwaiti ambassador. By the end of 1962, a series of major defeats at the hands of Kurdish rebels had severely damaged both the Iraqi army's morale and Qasim's popular support. From September 1962 through February 1963, Qasim repeatedly blamed the "criminal activities" of the U.S. for the battlefield successes of the Kurds, but the State Department rejected requests from the U.S. Chargé d'Affaires in Baghdad, Roy Melbourne, to publicly respond to Qasim's allegations out of fear that doing so would jeopardize the remaining U.S. presence in Iraq. On February 5, 1963, Secretary of State Dean Rusk informed the U.S. embassy in Iraq that the State Department was "considering carefully whether on balance U.S. interests would be served [at] this particular juncture by abandoning [its] policy of avoiding public reaction to Qasim's charges," with the reluctance stemming from the desire to avoid compromising the CIA's "significant intelligence collecting operations": On February 7, State Department executive secretary William Brubeck informed Bundy that Iraq had become "one of the more useful spots for acquiring technical information on Soviet military and industrial equipment and on Soviet methods of operation in nonaligned areas." The CIA had earlier penetrated a top-secret Iraqi-Soviet surface-to-air missile project, which yielded intelligence on the Soviet Union's ballistic missile program. With access to crucial intelligence hanging in the balance, U.S. officials were showing "great reluctance about aggravating Qasim."

After reaching a secret agreement with Barzani to work together against Qasim in January, the anti-imperialist and anti-communist Iraqi Ba'ath Party overthrew and executed Qasim in a violent coup on February 8, 1963. It has long been suspected that the Ba'ath Party collaborated with the CIA in planning and carrying out the coup. Pertinent contemporary documents relating to the CIA's operations in Iraq have remained classified, and modern academia have "remain[ed] divided in their interpretations of American foreign policy toward the February 1963 coup in Iraq." Bryan R. Gibson and Peter Hahn (in separate works) argue that although the U.S. had been notified of two aborted Ba'athist coup plots in July and December 1962, publicly declassified documents do not support claims of direct American involvement in the 1963 coup. On the other hand, Brandon Wolfe-Hunnicutt cites "compelling evidence of an American role," and that publicly declassified documents "largely substantiate the plausibility" of CIA involvement in the coup. Eric Jacobsen, citing the testimony of contemporary prominent Ba'athists and U.S. government officials, states that ample evidence exists of the CIA having assisted the Ba'athists in planning the coup.

Qasim's former deputy Abdul Salam Arif (who was not a Ba'athist) was given the largely ceremonial title of president, while prominent Ba'athist general Ahmed Hassan al-Bakr was named prime minister. The most powerful leader of the new government was the secretary of the Iraqi Ba'ath Party, Ali Salih al-Sa'di, who controlled the militant National Guard and organized a massacre of hundreds—if not thousands—of suspected communists and other dissidents in the days following the coup. The Kennedy administration viewed the prospect of an Iraqi shift in the Cold War with cautious optimism. However, U.S. officials were worried that a renewal of conflict with the Kurds could threaten the Iraqi government's survival. While Barzani had released 1,500 Arab prisoners of war as a gesture of good faith, Iraqi Foreign Minister Talib El-Shibib told Melbourne on March 3 that the government was unwilling to consider any concessions beyond cultural autonomy and was prepared to use anti-Barzani Kurds and Arab tribes in northern Iraq to co-opt the Kurds's guerrilla methods. On May 4, Melbourne delivered a message warning Shibib of the U.S. government's "serious apprehensions at [the] trend of events" and urging Iraqi officials to make "serious counter-proposals." Nevertheless, on May 22 al-Bakr bluntly told Melbourne he "could not permit this Kurdish challenge to Iraqi sovereignty to continue [for] much longer." The fighting resumed on June 10, when the Iraqi government—which had amassed 45,000 troops in Iraqi Kurdistan—arrested members of the Kurdish negotiating delegation and declared martial law throughout northern Iraq. Meanwhile, the Soviet Union actively worked to undermine the Ba'athist government, suspending military shipments to Iraq in May, convincing its ally Mongolia to sponsor charges of genocide against Iraq at the UN General Assembly from July to September, and sponsoring a failed communist coup attempt on July 3. The Kennedy administration responded by urging Arab allies of the U.S. to oppose the genocide charge at the UN and by approving a $55 million arms deal for Iraq. Furthermore, "Weldon C. Mathews has meticulously established that National Guard leaders who participated in human rights abuses had been trained in the United States as part of a police program run by the International Cooperation Administration and Agency for International Development." Because, in the words of State Department official James Spain, the "policy of the nationalist Arabs who dominate the Baghdad government does in fact come close to genocide"—as well as a desire to eliminate the Soviets' "Kurdish Card"—the new U.S. ambassador to Iraq, Robert C. Strong, informed al-Bakr of a Barzani peace proposal delivered to the U.S. consul in Tabriz (and offered to convey a response) on August 25. While a Barzani-initiated ceasefire would have allowed the government to claim victory, al-Bakr "expressed astonishment" over American contacts with the Kurds, asking why the message had not been delivered through the Soviets. Wolfe-Hunnicutt argues that the Kennedy administration's provision of military aid to the Ba'athist government, including napalm weapons, emboldened Iraqi hardliners and was counter-productive to the administration's stated preference for a diplomatic settlement to the First Iraqi–Kurdish War. An offer by Iraqi general Hasan Sabri al-Bayati to reciprocate this gesture by sending a Soviet T-54 tank in Iraq's possession to the U.S. embassy in Baghdad for inspection became something of a "scandal" as Bayati's offer had not been approved by al-Bakr, Shibib, or other senior Iraqi officials and was rescinded by the Ba'ath Party leadership after they became aware of it.

The Ba'athist government collapsed in November 1963 over the question of unification with Syria (where a different branch of the Ba'ath Party had seized power in March) and the extremist and uncontrollable behavior of al-Sa'di's National Guard. President Arif, with the overwhelming support of the Iraqi military, purged Ba'athists from the government and ordered the National Guard to stand down; although al-Bakr had conspired with Arif to remove al-Sa'di, on January 5, 1964, Arif removed al-Bakr from his new position as Vice President, fearful of allowing the Ba'ath Party to retain a foothold inside his government. On November 21, 1963, the Kennedy administration determined that because Arif remained the Iraqi head of state, diplomatic relations with Iraq would continue unimpeded.

=== Lyndon Johnson administration ===
Under the Presidencies of Arif, and, especially, his brother Abdul Rahman Arif, the U.S. and Iraq developed closer ties than at any point since the 1958 revolution. The Lyndon B. Johnson administration favorably perceived Arif's proposal to partially reverse Qasim's nationalization of the IPC's concessionary holding in July 1965 (although the resignation of six cabinet members and widespread disapproval among the Iraqi public forced him to abandon this plan), as well as pro-Western lawyer Abdul Rahman al-Bazzaz's tenure as prime minister; Bazzaz attempted to implement a peace agreement with the Kurds following a decisive Kurdish victory at the Battle of Mount Handren in May 1966. Abdul Rahman Arif (hereinafter referred to as "Arif") was considered "one of the few forces of moderation" in Iraq, having established a friendship with ambassador Strong prior to assuming the presidency and making a number of friendly gestures to the U.S. between April 1966 and January 1967. At Arif's request, President Johnson met five Iraqi generals and Iraqi ambassador Nasir Hani in the White House on January 25, 1967, reiterating his "desire to build an ever closer relationship between [the] two governments." According to Johnson's National Security Adviser, Walt Whitman Rostow, the NSC even contemplated welcoming Arif on a state visit to the U.S., although this proposal was ultimately rejected due to concerns about the stability of his government. Prior to the outbreak of the Six-Day War, Iraqi foreign minister Adnan Pachachi met with a number of U.S. officials to discuss the escalating Middle East crisis on June 1, including U.S. ambassador to the UN Arthur Goldberg, Under Secretary of State for Political Affairs Eugene V. Rostow, Secretary of State Dean Rusk, and President Johnson himself. The political atmosphere engendered by the costly Arab defeat prompted Iraq to break relations with the U.S. on June 7, and ultimately ensured the collapse of Arif's relatively moderate government. Like his brother, Arif previously tried to balance radical and moderate elements in Iraq, but this balancing act was upended by the war as Arif moved to placate the ascendant Iraqi nationalists, notably by reappointing Tahir Yahya to the position of prime minister. Yahya had announced his intention to create a national oil company during his first premiership in late 1963, laying the groundwork for the Iraq National Oil Company (INOC). During his second term as prime minister from July 1967 to July 1968, Yahya moved to revitalize the INOC and sought to work with France and the Soviet Union to develop the technical capacity to nationalize the IPC outright, pledging to use Iraq's "oil as a weapon in the battle against Israel."

Before leaving Baghdad on June 10, 1967, U.S. ambassador Enoch S. Duncan handed over the keys to the U.S. embassy to Belgian ambassador Marcel Dupret. Belgium became the protecting power for the U.S. in Baghdad, where lower-ranking American diplomats remained in the old embassy compound as the U.S. Interests Section of the Belgian Embassy. India agreed to serve as the protecting power for Iraq in Washington. Following the break in diplomatic relations, there were very few contacts between American and Iraqi officials until early 1972. In May 1968, the CIA produced a report titled "The Stagnant Revolution," stating that radicals in the Iraqi military posed a threat to the Arif government, and while "the balance of forces is such that no group feels power enough to take decisive steps," the ensuing gridlock had created "a situation in which many important political and economic matters are simply ignored." In June, the Belgians relayed a message from the U.S. State Department to Iraqi officials, offering to resume normal relations if Iraq agreed to provide compensation for damage to the U.S. embassy and consulate incurred during an earlier protest and met other conditions, including an end to the Iraqi boycott of U.S. goods and services imposed after Israel's 1967 victory; although U.S. officials were hoping to prevent a coup, there is no indication of any Iraqi response to this overture. On July 17, the Iraqi Ba'ath Party—led by al-Bakr as president, Abd ar-Rahman al-Dawud as defense minister, and Abd ar-Razzaq an-Naif as prime minister—seized power in a bloodless coup, placing Arif on a plane to London. Remembering the collapse of the short-lived coalition government in 1963, al-Bakr quickly ordered Naif and Dawud (neither of whom were Ba'athists) to be removed from their posts and exiled on July 30, cementing the Ba'ath Party's control over Iraq until the U.S.-led invasion in March 2003. al-Bakr was then named prime minister and commander-in-chief of the army.

On August 2, Iraqi foreign minister Abdul Karim Sheikhli announced that Iraq would seek close ties "with the socialist camp, particularly the Soviet Union and the Chinese People's Republic." By late November, the U.S. embassy in Beirut reported that Iraq had released many leftist and communist dissidents, although "there [was] no indication ... [they had] been given any major role in the regime." As the Arif government had recently signed a major oil deal with the Soviets, the Ba'ath Party's rapid attempts to improve relations with Moscow were not a complete shock to U.S. policymakers, but they "provided a glimpse at a strategic alliance that would soon emerge." In December, Iraqi troops based in Jordan "made international headlines" when they began shelling Israeli settlers in the Jordan Valley, which led to a strong response by the Israeli Air Force. al-Bakr claimed that a "fifth column of agents of Israel and the U.S. was striking from behind," and, on December 14, the Iraqi government alleged it had discovered "an Israeli spy network" plotting to "bring about a change in the Iraqi regime," arresting dozens of individuals and eventually executing 9 Iraqi Jews in January 1969. U.S. officials found the charges improbable, as Iraqi Jews were "under constant surveillance [and therefore] would make poor recruits for any Israeli espionage or sabotage net." Contributing to the growing atmosphere of crisis, the Ba'ath Party also escalated the conflict with Barzani by providing aid to Jalal Talabani's rival Kurdish faction. From the beginning, Johnson administration officials were concerned about "how radical" the Ba'athist government would be—with John W. Foster of the NSC predicting immediately after the coup that "the new group ... will be more difficult than their predecessors"—and, although initial U.S. fears that the coup had been supported by the "extremist" sect of the Ba'ath Party that seized control of Syria in 1966 quickly proved unfounded, by the time President Johnson left office there was a growing belief "that the Ba'ath Party was becoming a vehicle for Soviet encroachment on Iraq's sovereignty."

=== Alleged U.S. support for 1970 anti-Ba'athist coup attempt ===
The Richard Nixon administration was confronted with an early foreign policy crisis when Iraq publicly executed 9 Iraqi Jews on fabricated espionage charges at the end of January 1969. The Nixon administration initially sought to stay the executions by convincing American allies with close ties to Iraq—such as France, Spain, and India—to apply pressure on the government, but Iraqi officials responded "in no uncertain terms, to stay out of [Iraq's] domestic affairs." The U.S. also urged UN secretary general U Thant to intervene, but he was unable to influence Baghdad's decision. Nixon's secretary of state, William P. Rogers, condemned the executions as "repugnant to the conscience of the world," while U.S. ambassador to the UN Charles Yost took the matter to the UN Security Council, stating that Iraq's actions were "designed to arouse emotions and to intensify the very explosive atmosphere of suspicion and hostility in the Middle East." In early 1968, the U.K. had announced its intention to withdraw its forces from "East of Suez"—including the Persian Gulf region—thus alarming U.S. officials and prompting the Johnson administration to formulate what became known as the "twin pillar policy," in which the U.S. would support Iran and Saudi Arabia in their efforts to maintain the Gulf's stability. The Nixon administration would ultimately revise this policy by focusing on building up Iran, then ruled by Nixon's old friend Shah Mohammed Reza Pahlavi (hereinafter referred to as "the Shah"), as the dominant regional power. The Shah distrusted the Ba'athist government in Iraq, which he considered a "bunch of thugs and murderers." Following Iraq's provocative actions in January 1969, the Shah sought to "punish" Iraq, and possibly win partial Iranian sovereignty over the Shatt al-Arab waterway—which a 1937 treaty had given Iraq almost complete control over—through a series of coercive measures: At the beginning of March, he arranged for Iran's Kurdish allies to attack IPC installations around Kirkuk and Mosul, causing Iraq millions of dollars in damage; in April, he unilaterally abrogated the 1937 treaty; and in January 1970, he sponsored a failed coup attempt against the Iraqi government. The Shah knew that most of Iraq's army was deployed in Kurdistan—while an additional three Iraqi brigades were stationed in Jordan—thus Iraq was in no position to retaliate militarily, but he offered to "break off supplies to the Kurds in return for concessions in the Shatt," a proposal Iraq rejected.

The Shah's aggressive actions convinced Iraq to seek an end to the Kurdish War. In late December 1969, al-Bakr sent his deputy, Saddam Hussein, to negotiate directly with Barzani and his close aide Dr. Mahmoud Othman. The Shah was outraged when he learned of these negotiations, and sponsored a coup against the Iraqi government, which was scheduled for the night of January 20–21, 1970. However, Iraq's security forces had "complete recordings of most of the meetings and interviews that took place," foiling the plot, expelling the Iranian ambassador to Iraq, and executing "at least 33 conspirators" by January 23. On January 24, Iraq announced its support for Kurdish autonomy, and on March 11, Saddam and Barzani reached an agreement (dubbed the "March Accord") "to recognize the binational character of Iraq ... [and] allow for the establishment of a self-governing region of Kurdistan," which was to be implemented by March 1974, although U.S. officials were skeptical that the agreement would prove binding.

There were allegations of American involvement in the failed 1970 coup attempt, which involved a coalition of Iraqi factions, including Kurdish opponents of the Ba'ath Party. Edmund Ghareeb claimed that the CIA reached an agreement to help the Kurds overthrow the Iraqi government in August 1969, although there is little evidence to support this claim, and the CIA officer in charge of operations in Iraq and Syria in 1969 "denied any U.S. involvement with the Kurds prior to 1972." The State Department was informed of the plot by Iraqi businessman Loufti Obeidi on August 15, but strongly refused to provide any assistance. Iraqi exile Sa'ad Jabr discussed the coup planning with officials at the U.S. embassy in Beirut on December 8; embassy officials reiterated that the U.S. could not involve itself in the conspiracy, although on December 10 the State Department authorized the embassy to tell Jabr "we would be prepared to consider prompt resumption of diplomatic relations and would certainly be disposed to cooperate within the limits of existing legislation and our overall policy" if the "new government prove[d] to be moderate and friendly."

=== Kurdish intervention, 1972–1975 ===
In the aftermath of the March Accord, Iranian and Israeli officials tried to persuade the Nixon administration that the agreement was part of a Soviet plot to free up Iraq's military for aggression against Iran and Israel, but U.S. officials refuted these claims by noting that Iraq had resumed purging ICP members on March 23, 1970, and that Saddam was met with a "chilly" reception during his visit to Moscow on August 4–12, during which he requested deferment on Iraq's considerable foreign debt. Iraqi–Soviet relations improved rapidly in late 1971 in response to the Soviet Union's deteriorating alliance with Egyptian leader Anwar Sadat, who succeeded Gamal Abdel Nasser following Nasser's death on September 28, 1970. However, even after Iraq signed a secret arms deal with the Soviets in September 1971, which was finalized during Soviet Defense Minister Andrei Grechko's December trip to Baghdad and "brought the total of Soviet military aid to Iraq to above the $750 million level," the State Department remained skeptical that Iraq posed any threat to Iran. On April 9, 1972, Soviet Prime Minister Alexei Kosygin signed "a 15-year treaty of friendship and cooperation" with al-Bakr, but U.S. officials were not "outwardly perturbed" by this development, because, according to the NSC staff, it was not "surprising or sudden but rather a culmination of existing relationships."

It has been suggested that Nixon was initially preoccupied with pursuing his policy of détente with the Soviet Union and with the May 1972 Moscow Summit, but later sought to assuage the Shah's concerns about Iraq during his May 30–31 trip to Tehran. In a May 31 meeting with the Shah, Nixon vowed that the U.S. "would not let down [its] friends," promising to provide Iran with sophisticated weapons ("including F-14s and F-15s") to counter the Soviet Union's agreement to sell Iraq Mig-23 jets. According to Nixon's National Security Adviser and later Secretary of State, Henry Kissinger, and numerous scholars, Nixon also agreed to a covert operation to assist Barzani's Kurdish rebels while in Tehran. (Barzani had resumed his alliance with Iran and Israel after a December 1970 assassination attempt on his son Idris, which he held the Ba'ath Party responsible for.) There is, however, no official record that this occurred, with the only record that Nixon approved the operation being an August 1 memo from Kissinger to 40 Committee principals. It is therefore plausible that two additional factors ultimately convinced Nixon to approve the operation, despite widespread opposition to supporting the Kurds within the State Department and CIA: Iraq's complete nationalization of the IPC on June 1, after Iraq began exporting oil from North Rumaila to the Soviet Union in April; and the July 18 withdrawal of 15,000 Soviet military personnel from Egypt, which Kissinger's deputy, General Alexander Haig, Jr., predicted on July 28 "will probably result in more intense Soviet efforts in Iraq."

From October 1972 until the abrupt end of the Kurdish intervention after March 1975, the CIA "provided the Kurds with nearly $20 million in assistance," including 1,250 tons of non-attributable weaponry. The main goal of U.S. policy-makers was to increase the Kurds's ability to negotiate a reasonable autonomy agreement with the government of Iraq. To justify the operation, U.S. officials cited Iraq's support for international terrorism and its repeated threats against neighboring states, including Iran (where Iraq supported Baluchi and Arab separatists against the Shah) and Kuwait (Iraq launched an unprovoked attack on a Kuwaiti border post and claimed the Kuwaiti islands of Warbah and Bubiyan in May 1973), with Haig remarking: "There can be no doubt that it is in the interest of ourselves, our allies, and other friendly governments in the area to see the Ba'thi regime in Iraq kept off balance and if possible overthrown." After Nixon's resignation in August 1974, President Gerald Ford was briefed about the Kurdish intervention on a "need-to-know" basis—leaving Kissinger, former CIA director and ambassador to Iran Richard Helms, Arthur Callahan (chief of the CIA Station in Tehran), and Callahan's deputy—to actually implement the U.S. policy. To prevent leaks, the State Department was not informed of the operation. In fact, the State Department had dispatched Arthur Lowrie to establish a U.S. Interests Section in Baghdad shortly prior to Nixon's decision to support the Kurds; the Interests Section officially opened on October 1, 1972. Lowrie repeatedly warned that there was a power struggle between moderates and extremists within the Iraqi Ba'ath Party, and that the Shah's aggressive posture towards Iraq, combined with the Ba'ath Party's belief that the U.S. sought to overthrow it, empowered the extremists while forcing Iraq to turn towards the Soviet Union for arms resupply. Helms and the CIA rejected Lowrie's analysis and his proposal that the U.S. try to improve relations with Iraq, with Helms stating "[We] are frankly skeptical that in practice we could help the moderates without building up our extremist enemies." The CIA went further, producing a report that cautioned "the level of political violence is very high ... This is not a happy situation nor a happy government for the US to try to do business with." After a failed coup attempt on June 30, 1973, Saddam consolidated control over Iraq and made a number of positive gestures towards the U.S. and the West, such as refusing to participate in the Saudi-led oil embargo following the Yom Kippur War, but these actions were largely ignored in Washington.

On March 11, 1974, the Iraqi government gave Barzani 15 days to accept a new autonomy law, which "fell far short of what the regime had promised the Kurds in 1970, including long-standing demands like a proportional share of oil revenue and the inclusion of the oil-rich and culturally significant city of Kirkuk into the autonomous region" and "gave the regime a veto over any Kurdish legislation." Barzani allowed the deadline to lapse, triggering the outbreak of the Second Iraqi–Kurdish War in April. Although the CIA had stockpiled "900,000 pounds of non-attributable small arms and ammunition" to prepare for this contingency, the Kurds were in a weak position due to their lack of anti-aircraft and anti-tank weapons. Moreover, Soviet advisers contributed to a change in Iraq's tactics that decisively altered the trajectory of the war, allowing the Iraqi army to finally achieve steady gains against the Kurds where it had failed in the past. To prevent a collapse of the Kurdish resistance, Kissinger negotiated a deal with Israel to provide the Kurds with $28 million in heavy weaponry, but all assistance came to a sudden end shortly after the Shah and Saddam embraced one another at a press conference in Algiers on March 6, 1975: Saddam had agreed to a concession on the border of the Shatt al-Arab waterway in return for an end to "all subversive infiltration from either side." The increasingly overt Iranian involvement necessary to stave off a Kurdish defeat—including the presence of Iranian soldiers dressed in Kurdish uniforms, who participated in combat for as long as 10 days at a time, thus raising the possibility that further escalation might lead to "open war" between Iran and Iraq—combined with assurances from Arab leaders including Sadat, King Hussein of Jordan, and Algeria's Houari Boumédiène that "Saddam Hussein was ready to pull Iraq out of [the] Soviet orbit if Iran would take away the [Kurdish revolt] which was forcing them into the arms of the Soviets"—also helped convince the Shah that an accommodation with Iraq was necessary and desirable. In the aftermath, over 100,000 Kurds fled to Iran, while the Iraqi government brutally consolidated its control over Iraqi Kurdistan—destroying as many as 1,400 villages by 1978, imprisoning 600,000 Kurds in resettlement camps, and ultimately waging a campaign of genocide against the Kurds in 1988.

A leaked Congressional investigation led by Otis Pike and a February 4, 1976 New York Times article written by William Safire have heavily influenced subsequent scholarship regarding the conduct of the Kurdish intervention. As a result, there is a widespread belief that U.S. officials prodded Barzani into rejecting the Iraqi government's initial offer of autonomy, cynically agreed to "sell out" the Kurds at the Shah's behest, refused to provide any humanitarian assistance for Kurdish refugees, and failed to respond to "a heartbreaking letter" Barzani sent Kissinger on March 10, 1975, in which he stated: "Our movement and people are being destroyed in an unbelievable way with silence from everyone." In fact, declassified documents reveal that U.S. officials warned Barzani against his proposal to declare autonomy unilaterally, as they knew doing so would provoke the Iraqi government, even as the goal of permanently dividing Iraq and maintaining an autonomous Kurdish government would require massive resources irreconcilable with plausible deniability. However, Barzani could never have accepted Iraq's "watered-down autonomy law," as it was inconsistent with the terms of the March Accord and ignored outstanding Kurdish demands. The Shah's "sell-out" blindsided American and Israeli officials, as well as his own advisers; Kissinger had personally lobbied the Shah against reaching any agreement with Iraq, and questioned the logic of "trad[ing] a valuable coercive asset ... for a modest border concession." The U.S. provided $1 million in aid to Kurdish refugees—and, on March 17, Kissinger responded to Barzani's letter: "We can understand that the difficult decisions which the Kurdish people now face are a cause of deep anguish for them. We have great admiration for the courage and dignity with which those people have confronted many trials, and our prayers are with them." With neither Iran nor Turkey willing to allow their territory to be used to support the Kurds, the U.S. and Israel were forced to abandon their assistance. According to Bryan R. Gibson, "The Pike Report ignored inconvenient truths; misattributed quotes; falsely accused the United States of not providing the Kurds with any humanitarian assistance; and, finally, claimed that Kissinger had not responded to Barzani's tragic plea, when in fact he had ... This was not the 'textbook case of betrayal and skullduggery' that the Pike Report had led many people to believe." Gibson concedes that U.S. involvement was self-serving and "advanced America's Cold War interests, though not entirely at the expense of the Kurds." Joost Hiltermann offers a contrasting analysis: "The exoneration shouldn't go unqualified. Kissinger cared for the Kurds only to the extent that they could be used in the pursuit of US interests, and he would surely have abandoned them sooner or later."

=== Iran-Iraq War and resumption of diplomatic ties ===
Ba'athist Iraq–United States relations

- Iraq: United States

Even though Iraqi interest in American technical expertise was strong, prior to 1980 the government did not seem to be seriously interested in re-establishing diplomatic relations with the United States. The Ba'ath Party viewed the efforts by the United States to achieve "step-by-step" interim agreements between Israel and the Arab countries and the diplomatic process that led to the Camp David Accords as calculated attempts to perpetuate Arab disunity. Consequently, Iraq took a leading role in organizing Arab opposition to the diplomatic initiatives of the United States. After Egypt signed a peace treaty with Israel in 1979, Iraq succeeded in getting members of the League of Arab States (Arab League) to vote unanimously for Egypt's expulsion from the organization.

A review of thousands of declassified government documents and interviews with former U.S. policymakers shows that the U.S. provided intelligence and logistical support, which played a role in arming Iraq during the Iran–Iraq War. Under the Ronald Reagan and George H. W. Bush administrations, the U.S. authorized the sale to Iraq of numerous dual-use technology (items with both military and civilian applications), including chemicals which can be used in manufacturing of pesticides or chemical weapons and live viruses and bacteria, such as anthrax and bubonic plague used in medicine and the manufacture of vaccines or weaponized for use in biological weapons.

A report of the U.S. Senate's Committee on Banking, Housing and Urban Affairs concluded that the U.S. under the successive presidential administrations sold materials including anthrax, and botulism to Iraq right up until March 1992. The chairman of the Senate committee, Don Riegle, said: "The executive branch of our government approved 771 different export licenses for sale of dual-use technology to Iraq. I think it's a devastating record." According to several former officials, the State and Commerce departments promoted trade in such items as a way to boost U.S. exports and acquire political leverage over Saddam.

Relations between the U.S. and Iraq were strained by the Iran–Contra affair.

Rumsfeld, Ronald Reagan's then-special envoy to the Middle East meeting Saddam Hussein on 19–20 December 1983 during a visit to Baghdad. Rumsfeld later became the U.S. Secretary of Defense who led the coalition forces in 2003 against him.

The U.S. provided critical battle planning assistance at a time when U.S. intelligence agencies knew that Iraqi commanders would employ chemical weapons in waging the war, according to senior military officers with direct knowledge of the program. The U.S. carried out this covert program at a time when Secretary of State George P. Shultz, United States Secretary of Defense Frank C. Carlucci and National Security Adviser General Colin L. Powell were publicly condemning Iraq for its use of poison gas, especially after Iraq attacked Kurdish villagers in Halabja in March 1988. U.S. officials publicly condemned Iraq's employment of mustard gas, sarin, VX and other poisonous agents, but sixty Defense Intelligence Agency officers were secretly providing detailed information on Iranian deployments, tactical planning for battles, plans for airstrikes and bomb-damage assessments for Iraq. It has long been known that the U.S. provided intelligence assistance, such as satellite photography, to Saddam's regime. Carlucci said: "My understanding is that what was provided" to Iraq "was general order of battle information, not operational intelligence." "I certainly have no knowledge of U.S. participation in preparing battle and strike packages," he said, "and doubt strongly that that occurred." "I did agree that Iraq should not lose the war, but I certainly had no foreknowledge of their use of chemical weapons." Secretary of State Powell, through a spokesman, said the officers' description of the program was "dead wrong," but declined to discuss it. His deputy, Richard L. Armitage, a senior defense official at the time, used an expletive relayed through a spokesman to indicate his denial that the United States acquiesced in the use of chemical weapons.

Concern about the 1979 Islamic Revolution in Iran and about the Soviet invasion of Afghanistan prompted Iraq to reexamine seriously the nature of its relationship with the United States. This process led to a gradual warming of relations between the two countries. In 1981 Iraq and the United States engaged in low level, official talks on matters of mutual interest such as trade and regional security. In March 1982 the USA decided to remove Iraq from its list of countries supporting terrorism in order to be able to help Saddam Hussein to win the Iraq-Iran war. Following, the United States extended credits to Iraq for the purchase of American agricultural commodities, the first time this had been done since 1967. More significant, in 1983 the Baathist government hosted a United States special Middle East envoy, the highest-ranking American official to visit Baghdad in more than sixteen years. In a U.S. bid to open full diplomatic relations with Iraq, the country was removed from the U.S. list of State Sponsors of Terrorism. Ostensibly, this was because of improvement in the regime's record, although former United States assistant secretary of defense Noel Koch later stated, "No one had any doubts about [the Iraqis'] continued involvement in terrorism ... The real reason was to help them succeed in the war against Iran." In 1984, when the United States inaugurated "Operation Staunch" to halt shipment of arms to Iran by third countries, no similar embargo was attempted against Iraq because Iraq had expressed its desire to negotiate an end to the war. All of these initiatives prepared the ground for Iraq and the United States to reestablish diplomatic relations in November 1984. Iraq was the last of the Arab countries to resume diplomatic relations with the U.S.

In early 1988, Iraq's relations with the United States were generally cordial. The relationship had been strained at the end of 1986 when it was revealed that the United States had secretly sold arms to Iran during 1985 and 1986, and a crisis occurred in May 1987 when an Iraqi pilot bombed an American naval ship in the Persian Gulf, a ship he mistakenly thought to be involved in Iran-related commerce. Nevertheless, the two countries had weathered these problems by mid-1987. Although lingering suspicions about the United States remained, Iraq welcomed greater, even if indirect, American diplomatic and military pressure in trying to end the war with Iran. For the most part, the Iraqi government believed the United States supported its position that the war was being prolonged only because of Iranian intransigence.

=== Gulf War ===
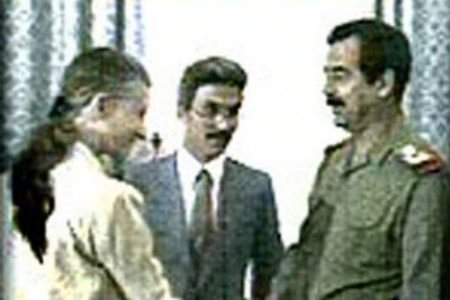
April Glaspie meets Saddam for an emergency meeting.

On July 25, 1990, following tensions with Kuwait, Saddam met with United States ambassador to Baghdad, April Glaspie, in one of the last high-level contacts between the two Governments before the Iraqi invasion of Kuwait on August 2, 1990. Iraqi Government officials published a transcript of the meeting, which also included the Iraqi foreign minister, Tariq Aziz. A copy was provided to The New York Times by ABC News, which was translated from Arabic. The U.S. State Department has declined to comment on its accuracy.

Glaspie is quoted saying to Saddam:

I have a direct instruction from the President to seek better relations with Iraq ... I know you need funds. We understand that and our opinion is that you should have the opportunity to rebuild your country. But we have no opinion on the Arab-Arab conflicts, like your border disagreement with Kuwait. I was in the American Embassy in Kuwait during the late 60s [during another Iraq-Kuwait border conflict]. The instruction we had during this period was that we should express no opinion on this issue and that the issue is not associated with America. James Baker has directed our official spokesmen to emphasize this instruction. We hope you can solve this problem using any suitable methods via Klibi or via President Mubarak. All that we hope is that these issues are solved quickly ... Frankly, we can see only that you have deployed massive troops in the south. Normally that would not be any of our business. But when this happens in the context of what you said on your national day, then when we read the details in the two letters of the Foreign Minister, then when we see the Iraqi point of view that the measures taken by the U.A.E. and Kuwait is, in the final analysis, parallel to military aggression against Iraq, then it would be reasonable for me to be concerned. And for this reason, I received an instruction to ask you, in the spirit of friendship—not in the spirit of confrontation—regarding your intentions.

However, Tariq Aziz told PBS Frontline in 1996 that the Iraqi leadership was under "no illusion" about America's likely response to the Iraqi invasion: "She [Glaspie] didn't tell us anything strange. She didn't tell us in the sense that we concluded that the Americans will not retaliate. That was nonsense you see. It was nonsense to think that the Americans would not attack us." And in a second 2000 interview with the same television program, Aziz said:

There were no mixed signals. We should not forget that the whole period before August 2 witnessed a negative American policy towards Iraq. So it would be quite foolish to think that, if we go to Kuwait, then America would like that. Because the American tendency ... was to untie Iraq. So how could we imagine that such a step was going to be appreciated by the Americans? It looks foolish, you see, this is fiction. About the meeting with April Glaspie—it was a routine meeting. There was nothing extraordinary in it. She didn't say anything extraordinary beyond what any professional diplomat would say without previous instructions from his government. She did not ask for an audience with the president. She was summoned by the president. He telephoned me and said, "Bring the American ambassador. I want to see her." She was not prepared, because it was not morning in Washington. People in Washington were asleep, so she needed a half-hour to contact anybody in Washington and seek instructions. So, what she said were routine, classical comments on what the president was asking her to convey to President Bush. He wanted her to carry a message to George Bush—not to receive a message through her from Washington.

Due to ongoing concerns over the security situation in Iraq, the U.S. State Department invalidated U.S. passports for travel to or through Iraq on February 8, 1991. The Gulf War cease-fire was negotiated at Safwan, Iraq on March 1, 1991, taking effect on April 11, 1991.

According to former U.S. intelligence officials interviewed by The New York Times, the CIA indirectly supported a bomb and sabotage campaign between 1992 and 1995 in Iraq conducted by the Iraqi National Accord insurgents, led by Iyad Allawi. The campaign had no apparent effect in toppling Saddam's rule, but the CIA was also involved in a failed 1996 coup against Saddam - and in October 1998, regime change became official U.S. policy with enactment of the "Iraq Liberation Act."

As a result of the war, Iraq and the United States broke off diplomatic relations for a second time. From 1990 to 2003, Algeria served as Iraq's protecting power in Washington, while Poland served as the protecting power for the United States in Baghdad. Diplomatic relations would not be restored until the United States overthrew Saddam Hussein in 2003 and established an American-aligned government.

=== 2003 U.S. invasion of Iraq ===
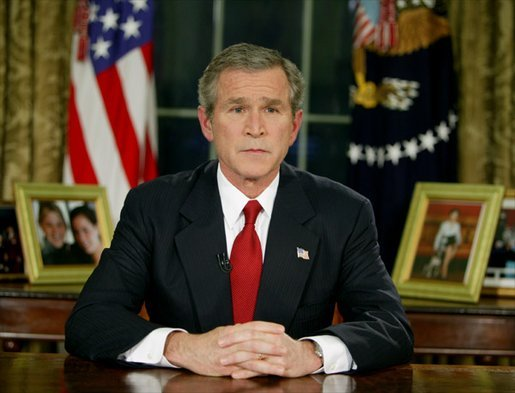
George W. Bush announces start to 2003 war in Iraq.

After the United Nations Security Council Resolution 687 and subsequent UN weapons inspectors inside Iraq there was a period of low-level hostilities between Iraq and the United States-led coalition from 1991.

In late 2001, Bush administration began actively pressing for military intervention in Iraq. The primary rationalization was articulated by a joint resolution of the U.S. Congress known as the Iraq Resolution, stating that the intent was to remove "a regime that developed and used weapons of mass destruction, that harbored and supported terrorists, committed outrageous human rights abuses, and defied the just demands of the United Nations and the world."

In the lead-up to the invasion, the U.S. and U.K. emphasized the argument that Saddam Hussein was developing weapons of mass destruction and that he thus presented a threat to his neighbors and to the global community. Throughout late 2001, 2002, and early 2003, the Bush Administration worked to build a case for invading Iraq, culminating in then Secretary of State Colin Powell's February 2003 address to the Security Council.

Accusations of faulty evidence and alleged shifting rationales became the focal point for critics of the war, who charge that the Bush Administration purposely fabricated evidence to justify an invasion that it had long planned to launch.

The invasion began on 20 March 2003, with the U.S., joined by the U.K. and several coalition allies, launching a "shock and awe" bombing campaign. Iraqi forces were quickly overwhelmed as U.S. forces swept through the country. The invasion led to the collapse of the Ba'athist government; Saddam was captured during Operation Red Dawn in December of that same year and executed by a military court three years later. However, the power vacuum following Saddam's demise and the mismanagement of the occupation led to a widespread civil war between Shias and Sunnis, as well as a lengthy insurgency against U.S. and coalition forces. The United States responded with a troop surge in 2007 to attempt to reduce the violence.

Shortly after the invasion, the Central Intelligence Agency, Defense Intelligence Agency, and other intelligence agencies largely discredited evidence related to Iraqi weapons as well as links to Al-Qaeda, and at this point the Bush and Blair Administrations began to shift to secondary rationales for the war, such as the Hussein government's human rights record and promoting democracy in Iraq.

UN Secretary-General Kofi Annan described the war as illegal, saying in a September 2004 interview that it was "not in conformity with the Security Council."

The U.S. began withdrawing its troops in the winter of 2007–08. The winding down of U.S. involvement in Iraq accelerated under President Barack Obama. The U.S. formally withdrew all combat troops from Iraq by December 2011.

=== Current status ===
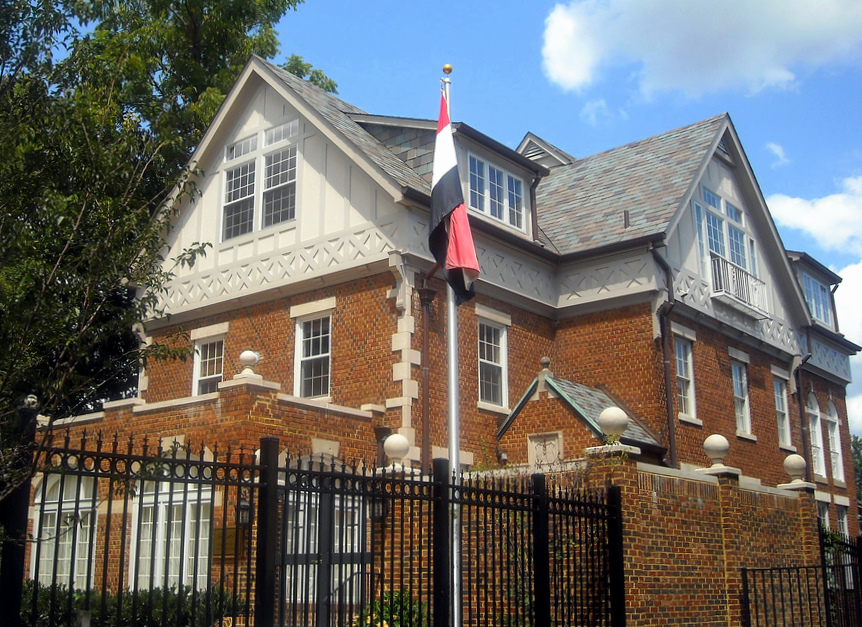
Embassy of Iraq in Washington, D.C.

The United States helped establish the Central Bank of Iraq in 2004, and for nearly two decades the U.S. dollar was commonly used in the country alongside Iraq's official currency. In January 2024, the Iraqi central bank banned dollar withdrawals and transactions to restore the status of the national currency.

The Iraqi insurgency, also referred to as the Iraq Crisis, escalated after the withdrawal of U.S. troops in 2011, resulting in violent conflict with the central government, as well as sectarian violence among Iraq's religious groups. This escalated into a civil war with the conquest of Fallujah and Mosul and major areas in northern Iraq by the Islamic State. This has resulted in airstrikes by Iran, Syria, and other countries – including the United States.

In January 2017, U.S. president Donald Trump issued an executive order banning the entry of all Iraqi citizens, as well as citizens of six other countries. After sharp criticism and public protests as well as lawsuits against the executive order, Trump relaxed the travel restrictions and dropped Iraq from the list of non-entry countries in March 2017.

As of October 2019, United States continued to use Iraqi bases for conducting operations such as the Barisha raid.

On 31 December 2019, the U.S. embassy in Baghdad was attacked by supporters of Popular Mobilization Forces militia in response to U.S. airstrikes on 29 December 2019.

After a 2020 attack near Baghdad International airport, outgoing prime minister Adil Abdul-Mahdi condemned America's assassination and stated that the strike was an act of aggression and a breach of Iraqi sovereignty which would lead to war in Iraq. He said the strike violated the agreement on the presence of U.S. forces in Iraq and that safeguards for Iraq's security and sovereignty should be met with legislation. The media office of the Iraqi military's joint operations forces posted a photo of a destroyed vehicle on fire after the attack. The speaker of Iraq's parliament Mohammed al Halbousi vowed to "put an end to the U.S. presence" in Iraq. In August 2020, United States returned the Ba'ath Party archives to Iraq, including more than 6 million pages, which were discovered in a basement under their headquarters in Baghdad in 2003, before being transferred to the United States in 2005, to be archived by the Hoover Institution.

As per two Iraqi government sources, U.S. secretary of state Mike Pompeo and Iraq's president Barham Salih held a conversation by phone in mid-September 2020. In the call Pompeo discussed recalling US diplomats from Iraq, followed by a threat to shut down the US Embassy in Iraq. Iraqi authorities feared the diplomatic withdrawal would lead to military confrontation with Iran, whom the U.S. blamed for missile and bomb attacks.

U.S. officials announced an agreement with the Iraqi government to conclude the military mission against the Islamic State group by 2025, which will involve U.S. troops leaving several bases that they have occupied for nearly two decades. In July 2026, U.S. and Iraqi officials announced that the U.S. military would fully exit Iraq by September 30.

In July 2026, the Islamic Resistance in Iraq, an umbrella group of Iran-backed militias, announced a $10 million reward for the assassination of U.S. president Donald Trump. The group claimed that the bounty was financed through donations from its members and supporters, and called on individuals or organizations to carry out or facilitate the killing. The announcement followed the collapse of a ceasefire between the United States and Iran, which had contributed to rising tensions across the region.

== See also ==
- 1991 Iraqi uprisings
- 1998 bombing of Iraq
- 2017 Mosul airstrike
- Casualties of the Iraq War
- CIA activities in Iraq
- Criticism of the Iraq War
- Cruise missile strikes on Iraq (June 1993)
- Embassy of the United States in Baghdad
- Gulf War
- Human rights in Saddam Hussein's Iraq
- Iraqi Americans
  - List of Iraqi Americans
- Iran–Iraq relations
- Iraq–Israel relations
- Iraq–Russia relations
- Iran–United States relations
- Legality of the Iraq War
- Opposition to the Iraq War
- Rationale for the Iraq War
- Saddam Hussein and al-Qaeda link allegations
- Sanctions against Iraq
- Timeline of the Iraq War
- United States Ambassador to Iraq
- United States support for Iraq during the Iran–Iraq War
- US-led intervention in Iraq (2014–2021)
- Occupation of Iraq (2003–2011)

== Bibliography ==
- Alnasrawi, Abbas (2001). "Iraq: Economic Sanctions and Consequences, 1990–2000". Third World Quarterly. 22 (2): 205–218. doi:10.1080/01436590120037036. ISSN 0143-6597.
- Avnerid, Netanel (2015). "The Iraqi Coups of July 1968 and the American Connection". Middle Eastern Studies. 51 (4): 649–663. doi:10.1080/00263206.2015.1014345. ISSN 0026-3206. JSTOR 44157666.
- Blackwell, Stephen (1999). "A desert squall: Anglo‐American planning for military intervention in Iraq, July 1958‐August 1959". Middle Eastern Studies. 35 (3): 1–18. doi:10.1080/00263209908701276. ISSN 0026-3206. JSTOR 4284021.
- Brigham, Robert K. (2013). The United States and Iraq Since 1990: A Brief History with Documents. John Wiley & Sons, Incorporated.
- Bozo, Frédéric (2016). A History of the Iraq Crisis: France, the United States, and Iraq, 1991-2003. Translated by Emanuel, Susan. Columbia University Press.
- Dodge, Toby (2010). "The failure of sanctions and the evolution of international policy towards Iraq, 1990–2003". Contemporary Arab Affairs. 3 (1): 83–91. doi:10.1080/17550910903525952. ISSN 1755-0912.
- Gibson, Bryan R. (2015). Sold Out? US Foreign Policy, Iraq, the Kurds, and the Cold War. Palgrave Macmillan.
- Gordon, Joy (2010). Invisible War: The United States and the Iraq Sanctions. Harvard University Press. doi:10.2307/j.ctv1mvw86c. JSTOR j.ctv1mvw86c.
- Hahn, Peter L. (2012). Missions accomplished? the United States and Iraq since World War I. Oxford University Press.
- Hurst, Steven (2009). The United States and Iraq since 1979: Hegemony, Oil, and War. Edinburgh University Press.
- Jacobsen, Eric (2013). "A Coincidence of Interests: Kennedy, U.S. Assistance, and the 1963 Iraqi Ba'th Regime". Diplomatic History. 37 (5): 1029–1059. doi:10.1093/dh/dht049. ISSN 0145-2096. JSTOR 44254343.
- Karam, Jeffrey G. (2017). "Missing revolution: the American intelligence failure in Iraq, 1958". Intelligence and National Security. 32 (6): 693–709. doi:10.1080/02684527.2016.1275138. ISSN 0268-4527.
- King, Brandon (2014). "In the eye of the storm: Ambassador James Richards' mission to Iraq in April 1957". Cambridge Review of International Affairs. 27 (3): 503–520. doi:10.1080/09557571.2012.678303. ISSN 0955-7571.
- Matthews, Weldon C. (2025). Iraqi Ba'thists in America's Cold War: Covert Action, Paramilitarism and Violence. Edinburgh University Press.
- Matthews, Weldon C. (2011). "The Kennedy Administration, Counterinsurgency, and Iraq's First Ba'thist Regime". International Journal of Middle East Studies. 43 (4): 635–653. doi:10.1017/S0020743811000882. ISSN 0020-7438.
- Mattox, Henry (2008). A Chronology of United States-Iraqi Relations, 1920-2006. McFarland & Company.
- O'Sullivan, Christopher; Damluji, Manaf (2009). "The Origins of American Power in Iraq, 1941–1945". Peace & Change. 34 (3): 238–259. doi:10.1111/j.1468-0130.2009.00553.x. ISSN 0149-0508.
- Petersen, Roger Dale (2024). Death, Dominance, and State-Building: The US in Iraq and the Future of American Military Intervention. Oxford University Press.
- Ryan, David; Kiely, Patrick, eds. (2009). America and Iraq: Policy-making, Intervention and Regional Politics. Routledge.
- Samuel, Annie Tracy (2014). "The Open Door and U.S. Policy in Iraq between the World Wars". Diplomatic History. 38 (5): 926–952. doi:10.1093/dh/dhu033. ISSN 0145-2096.
- Shareef, Mohammed (2018). The United States, Iraq and the Kurds: Shock, Awe and Aftermath. Routledge.
- Siracusa, Joseph M.; Visser, Laurens J. (2006). "George W. Bush, Diplomacy, and Going to War with Iraq, 2001 -2003" (PDF). The Journal of Diplomatic Research. 1 (1): 1–29.
- Williamson, Daniel C. (2006). "Understandable Failure: The Eisenhower Administration's Strategic Goals in Iraq, 1953–1958". Diplomacy & Statecraft. 17 (3): 597–615. doi:10.1080/09592290600867693. ISSN 0959-2296.
- Wolfe-Hunnicutt, Brandon (2015). "Embracing Regime Change in Iraq: American Foreign Policy and the 1963 Coup d'état in Baghdad". Diplomatic History. 39 (1). Oxford University Press: 98–125. doi:10.1093/dh/dht121. ISSN 0145-2096. JSTOR 26376642.
