= John D. Jernegan =

American diplomat (1911–1980)

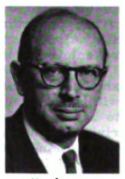

US Ambassador to Iraq
- In office December 11, 1958 – June 2, 1962
- President: Dwight D. Eisenhower; John F. Kennedy
- Preceded by: Waldemar J. Gallman
- Succeeded by: Robert C. Strong

2nd US Ambassador to Algeria
- In office July 22, 1965 – June 6, 1967
- President: Lyndon B. Johnson
- Preceded by: William J. Porter
- Succeeded by: Richard Bordeaux Parker

Personal details
- Born: June 12, 1911 Long Beach, California, US
- Died: November 6, 1980 (aged 69) Carmel Valley, California, US
- Spouse: Mary Margaret Brownrigg
- Education: Georgetown University; Stanford University

John Durnford Jernegan (June 12, 1911 – November 6, 1980) was an American career Foreign Service Officer who served as the Ambassador Extraordinary and Plenipotentiary to Iraq from 1958 until the Government of Iraq requested his departure on June 2, 1962. He left his post on June 11, 1962. Jernegan was also Ambassador Extraordinary and Plenipotentiary to Algeria from 1965 until Algeria severed diplomatic relations with the United States on June 6, 1967.

== Early life and career ==
Jernegan was born on June 12, 1911, in Long Beach, California. He attended the Georgetown University School of Foreign Service and has an AB and AM from Stanford University.

Before he was appointed as Ambassador, Jernegan worked as the Director of the Office of Greek, Turkish and Iranian Affairs (1949-1950) and Deputy Assistant Secretary for Near Eastern, South Asian and African Affairs (1952-1955). Jernegan also held the position of Faculty Advisor at the Air University at Maxwell Air Force Base.

He was considered Persona non Grata after siding with Britain when Britain planned to protect Kuwait when Abdul Karim Qasim, the Iraqi leader, laid claim to Kuwait. Qasim “designated the Kuwaiti monarch “qa’im maqam” – a subordinate to the governor of Basra – and threatened to “liberate” the country by force if the Kuwaiti monarch refused to accept this new designation.” .

== Death ==
Jernegan died in Carmel Valley, California, on November 6, 1980, at the age of 69.
