= Robert C. Strong =

American diplomat (1915-1999)

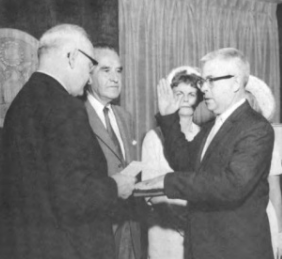
- Robert C. Strong sworn in as Ambassador to Iraq by William J. Tonask, Deputy Chief of Protocol. W. Averell Harriman, Undersecretary, looks on

US Ambassador to Iraq
- In office 1963–1967
- President: John F. Kennedy; Lyndon B. Johnson
- Preceded by: John D. Jernegan
- Succeeded by: Enoch S. Duncan

Personal details
- Education: Beloit College (B.A., 1938); University of Wisconsin

Robert Campbell Strong (September 29, 1915 – December 28, 1999) was a United States diplomat serving as head of U.S. missions in Baghdad, Iraq and Taipei, Taiwan.

== Biography ==
Born Robert Campbell Strong on September 29, 1915, in Chicago, Illinois, Strong eventually moved to Beloit, Wisconsin. He attended Beloit College where he was a member of Sigma Pi fraternity and graduated in 1938. He then studied at the University of Wisconsin-Madison.

Strong began his career in 1939 after passing a three day test to be admitted into the foreign service. He served as U.S. Vice Consul in Prague, Czechoslovakia and in Durban, South Africa. For a while, he was stationed at the U.S. Army War College in Carlisle, Pennsylvania. In 1949, he served as the U.S. Head of mission (Charge d’affaires) of the Embassy Office Taipei following the Retreat of the Republic of China to Taiwan. In April 1961, he was appointed Director of the Office of Near Eastern Affairs under Phillips Talbot. President Kennedy appointed him U.S. Ambassador to Iraq on May 13, 1963. He served in this capacity until 1967. On May 19, 1965, President Lyndon B. Johnson honored Strong with the National Civil Service League award.

He died on December 28, 1999, in Tucson, Arizona, and was buried at Beloit.

Strong's son, Gridley Barstow Strong, served in the United States Marine Corps during the Vietnam War and was killed during the Battle of Khe Sanh.

Diplomatic posts
Preceded by John D. Jernegan	United States Ambassador to Iraq; 1963–1967	Succeeded by Enoch S. Duncan
