= Edmund Ghareeb =

Lebanese-American academic

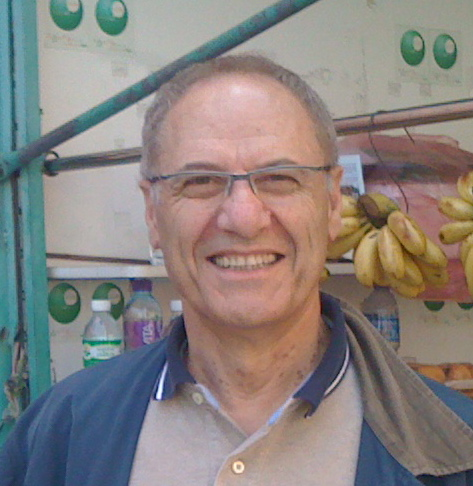
Edmund Ghareeb

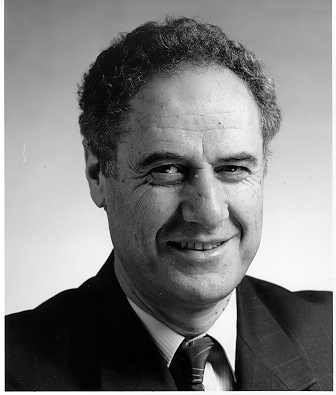
Edmund Ghareeb

Edmund Ghareeb (Born in Aita al-Foukhar; Arabic: إدموند غريب) is a Lebanese-American scholar at the American University in Washington and a professor at George Washington University's Elliott School of International Affairs. He earned a BA from the American International College and an MA and a PhD from Georgetown University.

Ghareeb has presented work on the potential revolutionary and transformational roles to be played by New Media in the Arab world; in a paper delivered at the Aseelah Forum in Morocco, and in two articles on the subject published by the Middle East Journal and Bahithat in 2000. His most recent work is a co-authored report entitled "Iraqi Refugees: Their History, cultures and Background Experiences". His most recent book is The Historical Dictionary of Iraq. In 2005, Library Journal described the book as one of the best reference works published in the United States in 2004. A new edition of the Iraq Dictionary is close to completion. He has also authored Split Vision: Portrayal of Arabs in the American Media and is co-author of War in the Gulf, recently issued in paperback by Oxford University Press. Dr. Ghareeb has lectured widely in the US, the Arab World and Europe. He has recently lectured in Brazil, Hong Kong, and Portugal. He has written articles about the Kurds, the Druze and Libya for The Encyclopedia of World Politics and Religion, and was interviewed for documentaries including: Al-Jazeera’s documentary on Kurdish leader Mulla Mustafa Barzani, Lucasfilm's upcoming documentary on Gertrude Bell, for a documentary on the history of the Arab American immigration to the US for the Voice of America, and was interviewed for a documentary on Arab Americans in the US for Alhurra TV and has appeared on C-SPAN multiple times.

== Publications ==
- Refugees from Iraq: Their History, Cultures, and Background Experiences. (With Donald Ranard and Jenab Tutunji). (The Center for Applied Linguistics' Cultural Orientation Resource Center, October 2008).
- Historical Dictionary of Iraq (co-author). (Scarecrow Press, 2004). ISBN 0-8108-4330-7.
- Al-Watan al-Arabi fi al-Siyassah al-Amrikiyyah {American Policies in the Arab World}. (Arab Studies Center, 2002).
- Thawrat al-Ma’lumat fi al-'Alam al- Alam al-Arabi {The Information Revolution in the Arab World}. (Jenin Research Center, 2001).
- Perspectives on the United Arab Emirates. (Trident Press, 1997).
- The Kurdish Nationalist Movement.
- War in the Gulf, 1990-91: The Iraq-Kuwait Conflict and Its Implications (with Majid Khadduri).
- The Kurdish Question in Iraq (Syracuse University Press, 1981)
- Split Vision: The Portrayal of Arabs in the American Media. (The Institute of Middle East and North African Affairs, 1977). (A new and expanded edition was published by the American-Arab Affairs Council in 1983.)
- Al-Harakah al-Qawmiyah al-Kurdiyyah {The Kurdish Nationalist Movement}. (Dar-al Nahar, 1973).
- Enemy of The Sun: Poetry of Palestinian Resistance (with Naseer Aruri) (Drum & Spear Press, 1970)
