= Bloc party =

Political party that is a constituent of an electoral bloc

A bloc party (German: Blockpartei), sometimes called a satellite party, is a political party that is a constituent member of an electoral bloc. However, the term also has a more specific meaning, referring to non-ruling but legal political parties in a one-party state (most notably communist states as auxiliary parties and members of a ruling coalition, differing such governments from pure one-party states such as Nazi Germany and the Soviet Union) although such minor parties rarely if ever constitute opposition parties or alternative sources of power. Other authoritarian regimes may also have multiple political parties which are nominally independent in order to give the appearance of political pluralism, but support or act in de facto cooperation with the government or ruling party.

== Background ==
The concept has its roots in the popular front idea where Marxist and non-Marxist political parties and other organisations would belong in an umbrella organisation. Following the end of World War II, elections were held in areas already under Soviet influence who would become members of the Eastern Bloc, that while giving voters a choice would be seen as a step towards a totalitarian, Communist-led regime. Bloc parties were able to retain their non-Marxist orientation, but in practice were always subordinate to the ruling Communist party, and were required to accept the Communists' "leading role" as a condition of their continued existence. All legal parties and civic organisations were required to be members of the official Communist-dominated coalition. Elections were not competitive as the composition of legislatures was generally pre-determined.

Parties only occasionally dissented from the line of the ruling party. Some parties were pre-existing, others had been newly formed, to appeal to specific sectors of society. However, during the fall of Communism, many hitherto subordinate bloc parties would begin to assert their independence and play a role in the democratisation process, while others would be unable to continue functioning either due to a loss of guaranteed yet artificial representation (granted to them by the ruling Communist Party), or due to the stigma of being associated with subservience to the Communists, and would either dissolve or fade into obscurity.

== Bloc parties under Communist regimes ==
East Germany, Czechoslovakia, Poland and Bulgaria operated bloc party systems where non-communist parties were constituent members of an official coalition. A similar system operates in China today.

=== East Germany ===
In the German Democratic Republic, the National Front was the umbrella organisation which included the ruling Socialist Unity Party of Germany, other political parties and various non-party organisations.

Germany was since 1945 divided into four occupation zones. Each occupying power decided which parties it allowed. Four parties were initially allowed in all four zones:

- Communist Party of Germany (KPD), which was built by a leadership group that survived the Second World War in Moscow.
- Social Democratic Party of Germany (SPD). In the Soviet zone, the Soviets forced it to unite with the KPD in 1946. This created the Socialist Unity Party of Germany (SED).
- Christian Democratic Union of Germany (CDU or CDUD). Although originally independent, in the Soviet Zone it was forced to follow Communist guidelines.
- Liberal Democratic Party of Germany (LDPD). In the East, it was also forced to follow Communist guiding principles; for this reason its western section split off in 1948 to form the Free Democratic Party (FDP).

The Soviet occupying government also allowed two other parties. They were both founded in 1948 on the initiative of the communists:

- Democratic Farmers' Party of Germany (DBD). It was supposed to take voters away from the CDU in rural areas.
- National Democratic Party of Germany (NDPD). It was supposed to take in National Socialists and former soldiers of the Wehrmacht.

All parties in the Soviet zone had to work together in the National Front under the leadership of the communists. This organisation also included so-called mass organisations, such as the communist-led trade union and the women's association or the youth association. The National Front determined the electoral list for the parliamentary elections: There was only one unified list of the entire National Front in a parliamentary election in the GDR.

As the Communists consolidated their power, the bloc parties all jettisoned their original programs. All of them nominally embraced "socialism", becoming loyal partners of the SED. With few exceptions, they voted unanimously for all government proposals. One of the few notable dissensions of a bloc party occurred in 1972 when members of the CDU in the Volkskammer took a stand against the legalisation of abortion, with the party's deputies either voting against the law or abstaining.

During the 'peaceful revolution' of 1989, the bloc parties began to assert themselves and emerge as independent parties, leading to the first and only free election to the Volkskammer in 1990. During the process of German reunification, the bloc parties merged with their western counterparts. Non-party organisations such as the Free German Youth, Kulturbund and the Democratic Women's League of Germany broke their formal affiliation with the former ruling party, but only the Free German Youth still operates today.

=== China ===
In China, under the premise of united front, eight democratic parties in the People's Republic of China have been recognized by the government. All the eight parties established in China date to before the creation of People's Republic of China, and are willing to collaborate with the Chinese Communist Party administration, have been recognized as "parties that can help joint administration of the country under Chinese Communist Party's lead". These parties are tasked to accept Chinese Communist Parties' leadership as well as political principle and direction.

=== North Korea ===
In North Korea, in addition to the ruling Workers' Party of Korea, there are also two other minor parties, the Korean Social Democratic Party (KSDP) and the Chondoist Chongu Party, that must accept the WPK's leading role as a condition of their existence.

=== Czechoslovakia ===
The 1946 elections saw only parties of the National Front, dominated by the Communist Party of Czechoslovakia, take part. However, elections were competitive, with the Communists and Social Democrats prevailing in the Czech lands, and the anti-Communist Democratic Party winning a comfortable majority in Slovakia. In 1948, however, the Communists seized power and non-Marxist parties were made subordinate to the Communists. During the Velvet Revolution, the parties became more assertive in pressuring for change, and transformed themselves for democratic politics. The Christian democratic Czechoslovak People's Party remains a player in Czech parliamentary politics.

=== Poland ===
The 1947 elections were blatantly rigged in favour of the Democratic Bloc, with Communist and Socialist parties being merged to form the Polish United Workers' Party (PZPR). In 1952 the Front of National Unity was formed, including the PZPR, the agrarian United People's Party (ZSL) and the centrist Democratic Party (SD), while up to three Catholic associations also had representation in the Sejm. Occasionally, deputies from these groups (most notably the Catholic Znak) offered limited criticism of government policies. A number of deputies from bloc parties also voted against the imposition of martial law in Poland, after which the Front of National Unity was replaced by the Patriotic Movement for National Rebirth which included the same as well as additional member organisations.

In 1989, partly free elections were held in which Solidarity won an overwhelming majority of freely contestable seats – only 35% of the Sejm – while the PZPR and bloc parties were reserved 65% of the seats. The ZSL and SD formed a coalition government with Solidarity, thus forming Poland's first non-Communist government since World War II. The SD continues today, whereas the ZSL eventually evolved into today's Polish People's Party. Two of the Catholic associations with Sejm representation continue today as lay Catholic organisations.

=== Bulgaria ===
During Communist rule in Bulgaria, the Bulgarian Agrarian National Union was the only other legal party than the Bulgarian Communist Party as a member of the Fatherland Front. A number of successor parties exist in post-Communist Bulgaria.

=== South Yemen ===
The rival FLOSY collapsed in 1967, leaving the National Liberation Front as the sole liberation front in South Yemen. It formed with the assadist People's Vanguard Party and the marxist Democratic Popular Union Party the "Unified Nationalist Front Political Organization" before merging into the Yemeni Socialist Party in 1978.

=== Other examples ===
In countries like Vietnam (until 1988), bloc parties also exist, playing a subordinate role to ruling Communist parties as constituent members of official coalitions.

In some countries, there were bloc parties before they were merged into the communist party. The members of the Hungarian National Independence Front were merged into the Hungarian Working People's Party in 1949. The People's Front of Yugoslavia originally had other party members. By 1953, the remaining bloc parties in the People's Democratic Front of Romania had been dissolved. The National United Front of Kampuchea included monarchist Khmer Rumdo and pro-North Vietnamese Khmer Issarak. The alliance between Khmer Rouge and monarchists was later revived in the Coalition Government of Democratic Kampuchea as the internally recognised government-in-exile against the likewise communist dominated People's Republic of Kampuchea.

== In non-communist regimes ==
A few examples of a bloc party system also exist in non-Communist regimes.

=== Austria ===
The Communist Party of Austria, while being in opposition, attempted to create bloc parties. The Socialist Workers' Party was meant to replace the Socialist Party of Austria as the main social democratic party while the Democratic Union was planned to replace the Austrian People's Party as the main conservative party. Together they formed the "Austrian People's Opposition" in the 1953 legislative election but only won 5.24%, crushing the plan.

=== Georgia ===
The People's Power party, a split-off of the ruling Georgian Dream, has been described as a satellite party by various observers.

=== Iran ===
Since the 1950s, Pahlavi Iran had a two party system, the ruling Nationalists' Party of PM Manouchehr Eghbal, which was later replaced by the Iran Novin Party, and the People's Party, which officially functioned as the opposition party. Effectively both parties were identical. In 1975, they were merged into the sole legal Rastakhiz Party.

=== Iraq ===
In the Republic of Iraq, the National Progressive Front was an umbrella organisation compromising the Ba'ath Party and several other pro-government parties, who in practice played a subordinate role to the Ba'ath Party. The Kurdistan Revolutionary Party, a faction of the Kurdistan Democratic Party and the Movement of Progressive Kurds were also accepted. The Ba'ath Party was overthrown and dissolved after the invasion of Iraq.

=== Israel ===
Up to the 1970s, Labor Zionist parties created so-called Arab satellite lists as Mapai only allowed Jewish members. These lists consisted of local politicians and clan leaders to secure wide support but they were loyal towards their patron and even voted to continue the Martial law over Arabs in Israel in 1961.

=== Mexico ===
In Mexico during the rule of the Institutional Revolutionary Party (PRI, 1929–2000), partidos paleros (satellite parties) included the Authentic Party of the Mexican Revolution and the Socialist Popular Party. These, alongside the National Action Party serving as a "controlled opposition", helped the PRI government give the superficial appearance of a competitive democratic system. In fact, both satellite parties fully supported the government and co-nominated the PRI candidates for the Presidency of Mexico until 1988.

=== Russia ===
The All-Russia People's Front includes the ruling United Russia, A Just Russia – For Truth, Rodina, New People, the Progressive Socialist Party of Ukraine, the Russian Union of Afghanistan Veterans, the Russian Union of Industrialists and Entrepreneurs, the Young Guard of United Russia, the Federation of Independent Trade Unions of Russia, and others.

=== Senegal ===
In 1976, the constitution was amended to allow three parties: a socialist party (the ruling Senegalese Progressive Union), a liberal party (the Senegalese Democratic Party) and a Marxist-Leninist party (the African Independence Party – Renewal).

=== Syria ===
In the Syrian Arab Republic, the National Progressive Front was an umbrella organisation comprising the Ba'ath Party and several other pro-government parties, who in practice played a subordinate role to the Ba'ath Party. Traditionally, legal political parties were required to follow the socialist and Arab nationalist or pan-Arabist orientation of the al-Assad regime. Later, parties were no longer required to do so in order to receive legal recognition and one such party, the Syrian Social Nationalist Party, was both legalised and admitted to the NPF. This gave rise to suggestions other parties that are neither socialist nor Arab nationalist would gain recognition, but ethnically based (Kurdish or Assyrian) parties continued to be repressed, and Islamist parties remained illegal. Following the victory of the Syrian revolution, the Front and all of its member parties were banned by the transitional government in January 2025.

=== Taiwan ===
Under martial law in Taiwan, only three parties were allowed: the Kuomintang, the China Democratic Socialist Party and the Young China Party. Until 1986, no opposition was allowed and they were barred from campaigning. Since the 1970s, there had been independent opposition candidates nicknamed Tangwai.

=== Turkmenistan ===
The country operated under a one-party system under the Democratic Party of Turkmenistan (TDP) from independence until 2008. However, the country remains totalitarian with the TDP not facing any competitive challenges in elections. The two other parties in the legislature as of 2018, the Agrarian Party and Party of Industrialists and Entrepreneurs, are seen as having only been created in order to give the impression of a multi-party system.

=== Uzbekistan ===
The country's ruling party, the Liberal Democratic Party, has never faced true opposition since its creation, with all other parliamentary parties seen as being allied with the government, only existing to give the impression of multi-party politics.

=== Venezuela ===
In 2020, the Supreme Tribunal of Justice imposed ad hoc leaderships on many opposition parties which either called to boycott the 2020 parliamentary election or joined the leftist opposition Popular Revolutionary Alternative alliance. Among them was Justice First of anti-president Juan Guaidó. Some described them as being turned into bloc parties.

== See also ==
- Parliamentary group
- Electoral alliance
- Fraternal party
- List of political groups by country
- Party of power
- Political groups, may be regarded as satellite parties of the leading party
- Decoy list
- Arab satellite lists
- Systemic opposition
- Uniparty
