= Kamal al-Hadithi =

Iraqi poet (1939–2018)

- كمال الحديثي
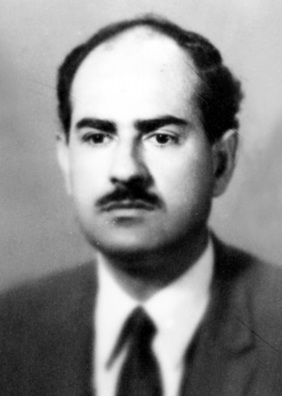
- Al-Hadithi, 1970s
- Born: Kamal Abdullah Zuwayd al-Hadithi; 1939; Haditha, Anbar, Kingdom of Iraq
- Died: February 12, 2018 (aged 79); Baghdad, Iraq
- Education: University of Baghdad
- Occupations: poet; journalist; teacher; politician
- Writing career
- Language: Arabic
- Genres: National poetry, Political poetry, Epic poetry

Kamal al-Hadithi (Arabic: كمال الحديثي, romanized: Kamāl al-Ḥadīthī; 1939 – 12 February 2018) was an Iraqi poet and journalist, best known for his Arab nationalist inclinations, who published about seventeen poetry collections between 1979 and 2001. He was born in Haditha in Anbar, graduated from University of Baghdad in 1960, then worked as a school teacher and head teacher in the 1960s and 1970s. One of the prominent culture-related figures of the Iraqi Ba'ath Party from 1978, he was elected as Member of the Iraqi National Assembly for two consecutive terms, 1980 and 1988. After 2003 deposing Ba'athist government, Al-Hadithi lived in silence and isolation for years until died in Baghdad at the age of 79.

== Biography ==
Kamal bin Abdullah bin Zuwaid al-Hadithi was born in 1939 in Haditha, Anbar Governorate, Kingdom of Iraq. He completed his primary studies there, middle school in Anah, and secondary school in Ramadi in 1956. He went to Baghdad, and joined the Department of Arabic Language, College of Arts in University of Baghdad, from which he graduated in 1960.

After graduation, he was assigned as an Arabic language teacher in various schools, including: Primary Teachers' House 1960–1963, Nasiriyah Preparatory School for Boys, Seleikh Intermediate and Suwis High School from 1963 to 1968. Since 1968, he has worked as an editor in Al-Thawra newspaper, then became its first deputy editor-in-chief after that, he has been also the director of the Culture and Information Office since 1977, and the Principal of the Ba'ath Party Preparation School. He entered politics in the 1980s and was a member of the National Assembly of [Baathist] Iraq for two consecutive terms between 1980 and 1988. He received a Certificate of Merit in 1984, and was awarded the High Merit in poetry and prose.

He held the position of Director of the Culture and Information Office in the National Command of the Baath Party since 1977, and was appointed in 1997 as an advisor in the Presidential Office, while retaining his position as Director of the Office of Culture and Information in the National Command. He was a member of the Union of Iraqi Writers, Iraqi Journalists Syndicat and the Iraqi Academy of Sciences.

Al-Hadithi died in Baghdad on 12 February 2018 at the age of 79. Regional Command of the Arab Socialist Ba'ath Party – Iraq Region remarked him and released an obituary notice.

== Works ==
Poetry collections:

- Arabic: أغاني الموسم الأخضر, romanized: Aghānī al-mawsim al-akhḍar, 1979
- Arabic: قصائدنا, romanized: Qaṣāʼidunā, 1980
- Arabic: ديوان رئة على القادسية, romanized: Dīwān Riʾah ʻalá al-Qādisīyah, 1981
- Arabic: حصحص الحق, romanized: Ḥaṣḥas̄a al-ḥaqq, 1981
- Arabic: في دروب الخيل, romanized: Fī durūb al-khayl, 1983
- Arabic: حصاد من أرض الطوفان, romanized: Ḥaṣād min arḍ al-ṭūfān, 1986
- Arabic: هنا الفاو, romanized: Hunā al-Fāw, 1988
- Arabic: طواف في ذكريات بغداد, romanized: Ṭawāf fī dhākirat Baghdād, 1988
- Arabic: البيان الاخير, romanized: al- Bayān al-aẖīr., 1988
- Arabic: استراحة محارب, romanized: Istirāḥat muḥārib, 1992
- Arabic: تداعيات في زمن الحب, romanized: Tadāʻīyāt fī zaman al-Ḥubb, 1992
- Arabic: في البدء كان العراق, romanized: Fī al-badʼ kān al-ʻIrāq, 1994
- Arabic: ىيوان خوالج في نشيد العبور, romanized: Dīwān khawālij fī nashīd al-ʻubūr, 1995
- Arabic: نجوى محب, romanized: Najwá muḥibb, 1996
- Arabic: عهد, romanized: ʻAhd, 1997
- Arabic: في الشموع الستين, romanized: Fī al-shumūʻ al-sittīn, 1998
- Arabic: تراتيل حب, romanized: Tarātīl ḥubb, 2001

Books:

- Arabic: الثورة؛ المنهج والإنسان, romanized: al-Thawrah-- al-manhaj wa-al-insān, 1979
- Arabic: معالجات في إطار الثورة العربية, romanized: Muʻālajāt fī iṭār al-thawrah al-ʻArabīyah, 1980
- Arabic: إيران، النظام الجديد، القديم, romanized: Īrān--al-niẓām al-jadīd-al-qadīm, 1981
- Arabic: رحلة مع صدام؛ انسانًا وقائدًا, romanized: Riḥlah maʻa Ṣaddām-- insānan wa-qāʼidan, 1983
