= 2002 Iraqi presidential referendum =

- October 16, 2002
- Turnout: 100%
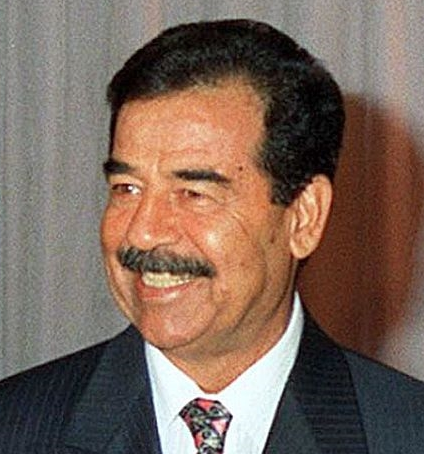
Nominee	Saddam Hussein
Party	Ba'ath Party
Alliance	NPF
Popular vote	11,445,638
Percentage	100%
- Results by governorate Hussein: 100%
President before election
Saddam Hussein
Ba'ath Party
Elected President
Saddam Hussein
Ba'ath Party

A presidential referendum took place in Iraq on October 16, 2002. It was the second presidential election under the rule of Saddam Hussein (the first having taken place in 1995). According to official statistics, the turnout was 100%, with all 11,445,638 Iraqis registered to vote having voted "yes" in a referendum whether to support another seven year-term for President Saddam Hussein, which would legally have ended in 2009.

The referendum is considered to have been fraudulent, and was dismissed as propaganda by the United States and Britain. White House Press Secretary Ari Fleischer said: "Obviously, it's not a very serious day, not a very serious vote and nobody places any credibility on it". United States State Department spokesman Richard Boucher called it "not even worthy of our ridicule". Foreign election observers were banned from observing the vote, and journalists were confined to a specific area; as such, actual voter turnout could not be estimated. The Washington Post noted that no explanation was given to explain how all the alleged votes were counted overnight. Top Iraqi deputy Izzat Ibrahim affirmed the vote's legitimacy, saying: "You may like it or not, but this is a truthful figure."

== Results ==
Choice	Votes	%
For	11,445,638	100.00
Against	0	0.00
Total	11,445,638	100.00
Valid votes	11,445,638	100.00
Invalid/blank votes	0	0.00
Total votes	11,445,638	100.00
Registered voters/turnout	11,445,638	100.00
