= National Progressive Front =

National Progressive Front may refer to:

- National Progressive Front (Iraq), a coalition of Iraqi political parties
- National Progressive Front (Syria), a coalition of Syrian political parties
