= 1996 Iraqi parliamentary election =

- 24 March 1996

All 250 seats in the National Assembly 126 seats needed for a majority
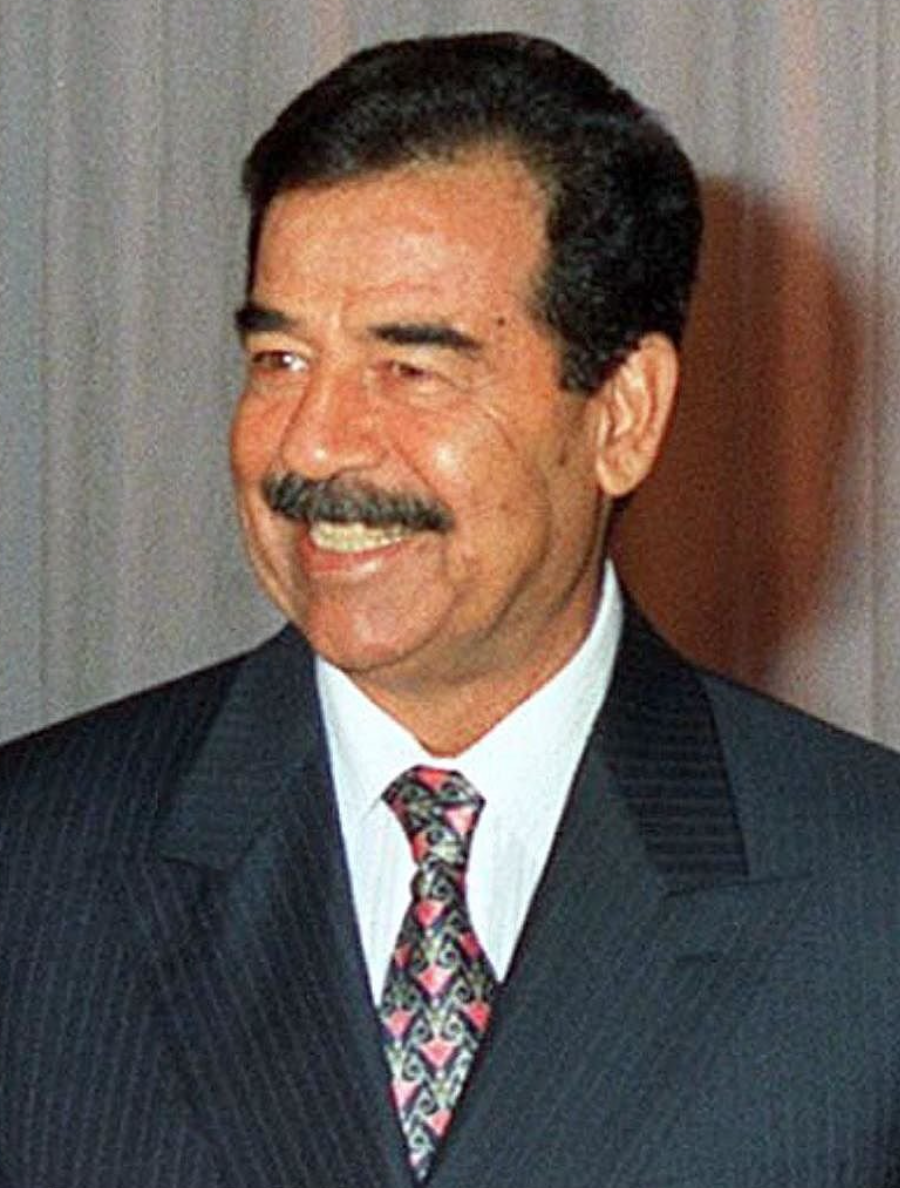
	First party
Leader	Saddam Hussein
Party	Ba'ath Party
Alliance	NPF
Last election	207
Seats won	161
Seat change	▼46
Prime Minister before election
Saddam Hussein
Ba'ath Party
Elected Prime Minister
Saddam Hussein
Ba'ath Party

Parliamentary elections were held in Iraq on 24 March 1996. The elections were contested by 689 candidates, although 30 MPs were appointed to represent Iraqi Kurdistan. The result was a victory for the Ba'ath Party, which won 161 of the 250 seats. Voter turnout was reported to be 93.5%.

All candidates "had been approved beforehand by a committee chaired by the Justice Minister".

== Results ==
Party	Votes	%	Seats	+/–
Ba'ath Party			161	–46
Kurdistan Democratic Party			3	New
Kurdistan Revolutionary Party			2	New
Communist Party of Iraq			1	New
Independents			83	+40
Total			250	0
Total votes	7,480,000	–		
Registered voters/turnout	8,000,000	93.50		
Source: IPU
