= 1995 Iraqi presidential referendum =

Referendum reconfirming Saddam Hussein as president of Iraq

- October 15, 1995
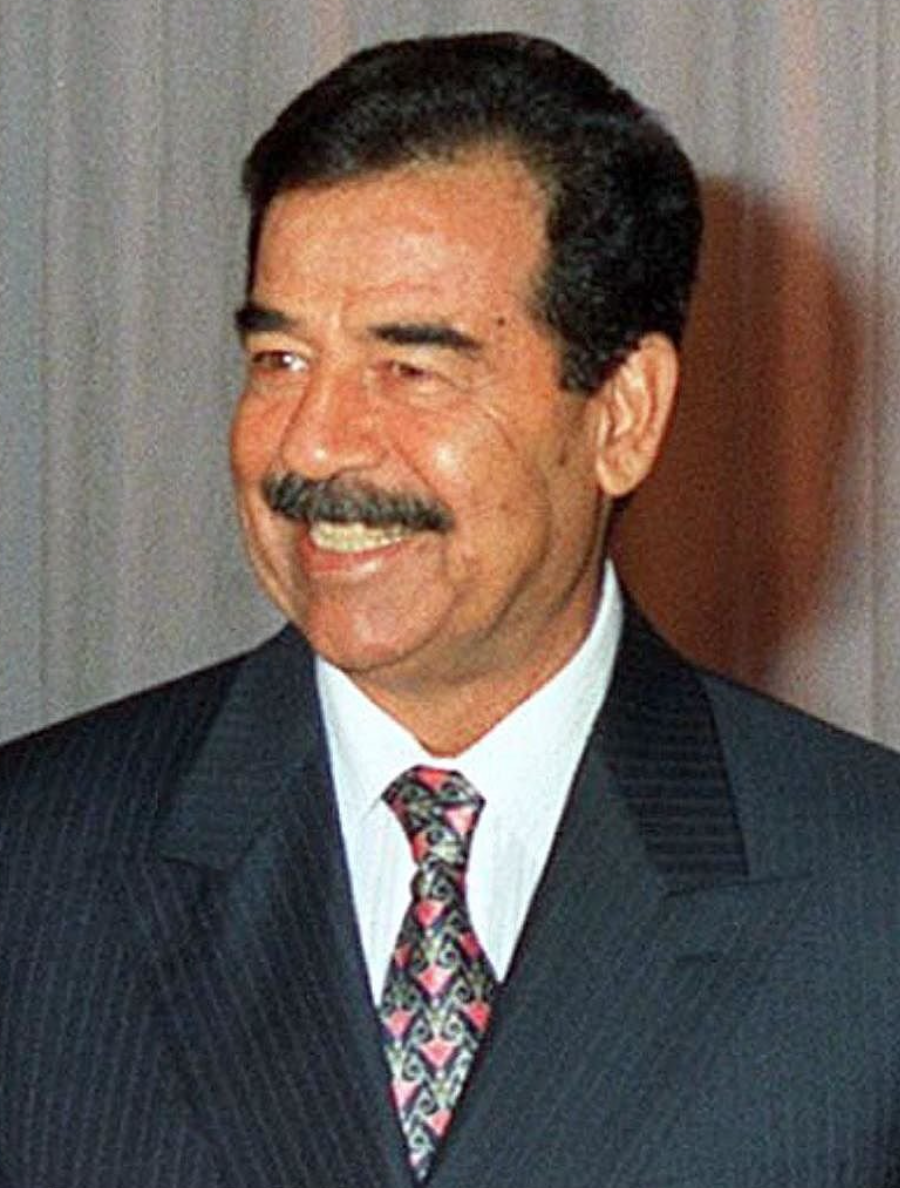
Nominee	Saddam Hussein
Party	Ba'ath Party
Alliance	NPF
Popular vote	8,348,700
Percentage	99.99%
- Results by governorate Hussein: 99–100%
President before election
Saddam Hussein
Ba'ath Party
Elected President
Saddam Hussein
Ba'ath Party

A presidential referendum was held in Iraq on October 15, 1995. It was the first direct presidential election in Ba'athist Iraq under the rule of Saddam Hussein, who had seized power through the Revolutionary Command Council (RCC) in 1979. Taking the form of a referendum with no other candidates, the election involved distributing to voters paper ballots that said: "Do you approve of President Saddam Hussein being the President of the Republic?" They then used pens to mark "yes" or "no". The next day, Izzat Ibrahim al-Douri, Hussein's deputy in the ruling RCC, announced the incumbent had won 99.96% of some 8.4 million valid votes cast. Officially, 3,052 people voted against him (45 of them in Baghdad), and turnout was 99.47%. The international community reacted with widespread incredulity to these figures.

== Background ==
The election was prompted by the August defection to Jordan of senior government officials Hussein Kamel al-Majid and Saddam Kamel and their wives. During the crisis that followed, Saddam took steps to control the damage; the referendum was an attempt to shore up his claim to legitimacy. At a September 7 meeting of the RCC, an interim amendment to the Constitution was approved whereby its chairman would automatically assume the presidency, subject to approval of the National Assembly and endorsement by national plebiscite. Parliament approved his candidacy on September 10, setting the stage for the meticulously organised election.

Prior to the election, Ba'ath Party members visited homes, making sure to ask if households had ration cards (at the time, food was scarce as a result of the Iraq sanctions); the clear implication was that the wrong kind of vote could mean no food. Voters were required to name relatives on their ballots and, according to some opposition reports, were threatened with punishment against their families if they voted "no". In a November report, the UN Special Rapporteur noted that because of the intrusiveness of the security apparatus "virtually no citizen would risk demonstrating any opposition to the Presidency or Government—or would do so at his mortal peril"; the notion that opponents would face some sort of retribution was shared by most observers. During the election, which served to emphasize that the Baath Party and the RCC were the country's true centres of power, loyal and tenacious party cadres brought voters in droves to the polling stations, themselves swamped with pro-Hussein propaganda. The result confirmed that Iraqis' fear of Saddam was greater than the severe hardship that had resulted from the sanctions.

== Preparations ==
The campaign involved unending glorification of Saddam; for instance, General Ali Hassan al-Majid declared, "O lofty mountain! O glory of Iraq! By God we have always found you in the most difficult conditions a roaring lion and a courageous horseman, one of the few true men". Saddam himself never appeared in public prior to the election, but paid supporters streamed through the streets, shouting "Naam, naam, Saddam" ("Yes, yes, Saddam"). A highlight came four days prior to the vote at an Iraq-Qatar football game, when a dejected, pensive-looking Uday Hussein (normally glamorized) was shown on television, upset by what the announcer claimed was a (probably fictitious) fire that Saddam had set to his expensive cars as punishment for attacking Watban Ibrahim al-Tikriti and for the defections; soon afterward, Uday's role was increased as he sought to lure the men and their wives back to Iraq.

Confident of popular participation, the government invited some 500 foreign journalists to witness the exercise; turnout (at least in Baghdad) was large enough to impress the visiting reporters, although the official figure was doubtless exaggerated. One Western ambassador was impressed by the show of force involved, including a unanimous vote from Karbala (centre of the 1991 Shiite uprising against Saddam): "If this referendum proves anything, it is that the party is firmly in control of Iraq and Saddam runs it with an iron fist. If they can organize a referendum like this in less than three weeks, mobilize party cadres in every village, hamlet, town and city, produce precise lists for eight million voters and march all of them to the polls to say 'yes' unanimously, it means they are not about to fall".

== Unfolding ==
The most common sentiment heard from ordinary voters was that Saddam had managed to keep the country together and provided strong leadership, implying his overthrow would lead to the sort of chaos seen in Bosnia and Herzegovina or Lebanon. The top foreign observer was Russian nationalist politician Vladimir Zhirinovsky, who was treated to a palace feast with Hussein, Tariq Aziz and other top officials shortly before voting began. Following the election, on October 17 Hussein was sworn into his new term in a televised ceremony; Aziz pledged political reforms, including parliamentary elections that took place the following year.

== Results ==
Choice	Votes	%
For	8,348,700	99.99
Against	984	0.01
Total	8,349,684	100.00
Valid votes	8,349,684	99.91
Invalid/blank votes	7,876	0.09
Total votes	8,357,560	100.00
Registered voters/turnout	8,402,321	99.47
Source: Direct Democracy
