= Progressive Socialist Organizations of the Mediterranean =

International bloc of socialist movements

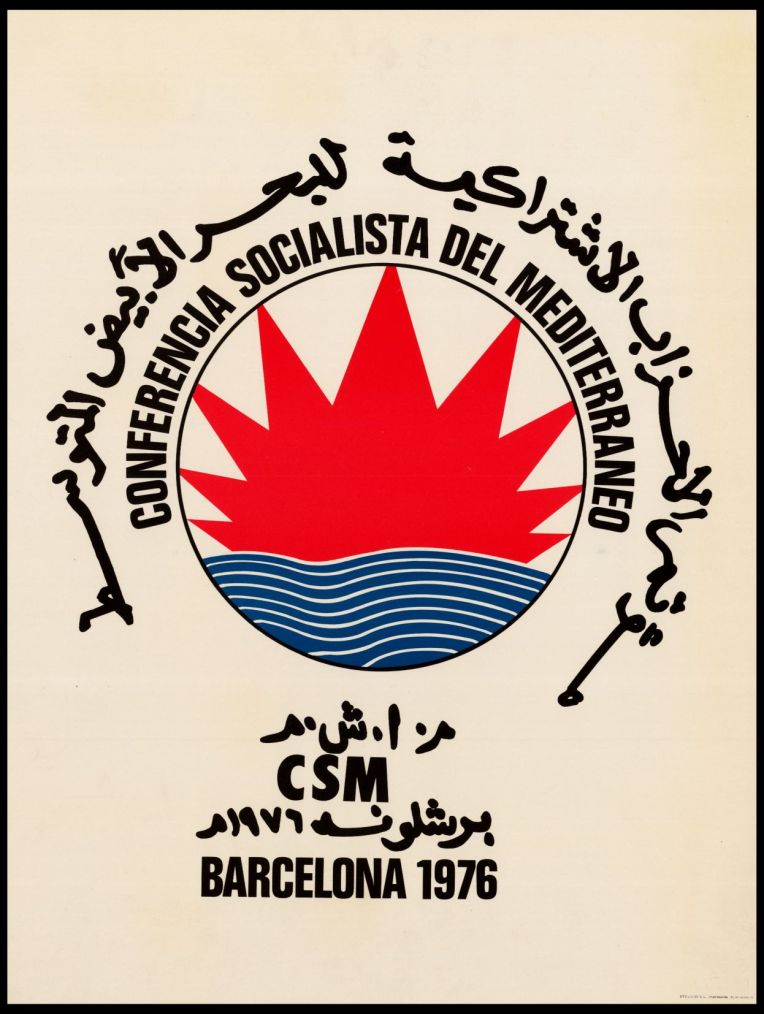

The Progressive Socialist Organizations of the Mediterranean (PSOM), (Arabic: مؤتمر الاحزاب الاشتراكية للبحر الأبيض المتوسط) also known as the Mediterranean Socialist Conference, was a bloc and gathering of socialist parties and movements of the Mediterranean region, conceived and planned by Andreas Papandreou of Greece and Dom Mintoff of Malta and mostly funded by Muammar Gaddafi’s Libya.

PSOM aimed to function as an alternative to the Socialist International (SI), which, PSOM members felt, was under the negative influence and hegemony of the West German SPD, which was considered an “almost conservative” party, and this despite the personal friendship of Willy Brandt and Papandreou. Dislike towards the SPD had mainly to do with its embrace of what PSOM members felt was West Germany’s “subservience” regarding NATO’s “inordinate hostility” towards the Soviet Union and anti-colonial left-wing movements.

PSOM was also notable for bringing together mutually hostile parties and trying to bridge their differences, such as with the case of the Syrian Ba'ath of Hafez al-Assad and the Iraqi Ba'ath of Ahmed Hassan al-Bakr and Saddam Hussein, or the Syrian Ba'ath and Yasser Arafat’s Fatah, that presided over the PLO, despite Syrian and Libyan opposition. The generally moderate ruling party of Tunisia (Socialist Destourian Party) also participated, and, after Hosni Mubarak rose to power in Egypt in 1981, he made sure to maintain some contacts with PSOM, but without officially joining. Andreas Papandreou eventually convinced François Mitterrand, Bettino Craxi and Felipe González to also join PSOM.

== Leadership ==
PSOM was coordinated by a Permanent Secretariat, headquartered in Tripoli, Libya (Gaddafi was the chief financial sponsor of PSOM) and presided over by the Secretary-General, Libyan diplomat Ahmed al-Shahati (1936-2006, a career diplomat who had joined the Libyan diplomatic service during the regime of King Idris). Karolos Papoulias, Secretary of PASOK’s International Relations Committee (later Foreign Minister and President of Greece) played a key organizing role for PSOM’s events and conferences.

== Activities ==
PSOM organized a series of conferences, of which the first took place in November 1976 in Barcelona, Spain. The next was in Valletta, Malta in June 1977, which led to the signing of the “Malta Document”, outlining the basic thrust of PSOM’s policies and officially establishing the Permanent Secretariat in Tripoli, Libya. In May 1979, the third conference took place in Greece, in the seaside Athenian suburb of Vouliagmeni. The fourth conference was in Algiers, Algeria (May 1982), the fifth in Belgrade, Yugoslavia (May 1984) and the sixth in Nicosia, Cyprus (October 1988).

== Member parties and organizations ==
In the first conference that took place in Barcelona (November 1976), the following parties (not all of them from the Mediterranean) were represented (in alphabetical order of countries):

- Algeria: National Liberation Front (ruling party)
- Cyprus: EDEK Socialist Party
- Denmark: Socialist People's Party
- France: Unified Socialist Party
- Greece: Panhellenic Socialist Movement (PASOK)
- Iraq: Arab Socialist Baath Party (ruling party)
- Italy: Italian Socialist Party
- Lebanon: Syrian Social Nationalist Party in Lebanon and Popular Nasserist Organization
- Libya: Arab Socialist Union (ruling party)
- Malta: Malta Labour Party (ruling party)
- Morocco: Socialist Union of Popular Forces
- Netherlands: Socialist Party
- Palestine: Palestine Liberation Organization (PLO), represented by Fatah
- Portugal: Socialist Party (in government) and Socialist Intervention Group
- Spain: People’s Socialist Party and Federation of Socialist Parties
- Syria: Arab Socialist Baath Party (ruling party)
- Tunisia: Socialist Destourian Party (ruling party)

Between 1977 and 1982, as a result of lobbying and development of contacts, more political parties and movements agreed to join PSOM, so that by the time of the 4th conference in Algiers (May 1982), the following parties and organizations had become members, in addition to those previously noted:

- Egypt: National Progressive Unionist Rally Party
- Italy: Italian Communist Party
- France: Socialist Party (in government), French Communist Party
- Lebanon: Lebanese National Movement
- Libya: General People’s Congress (as a representative of the ruling “Jamahiriya” following the abolition of all political parties in Libya decreed by Gaddafi in 1977)
- Sahrawi Arab Democratic Republic: Polisario Front (ruling party)
- Spain: Spanish Socialist Workers' Party (in government)
- Yugoslavia: League of Communists of Yugoslavia (ruling party), Socialist Alliance of Working People of Yugoslavia
