= 1984 Iraqi parliamentary election =

- 20 October 1984

All 250 seats in the National Assembly 126 seats needed for a majority
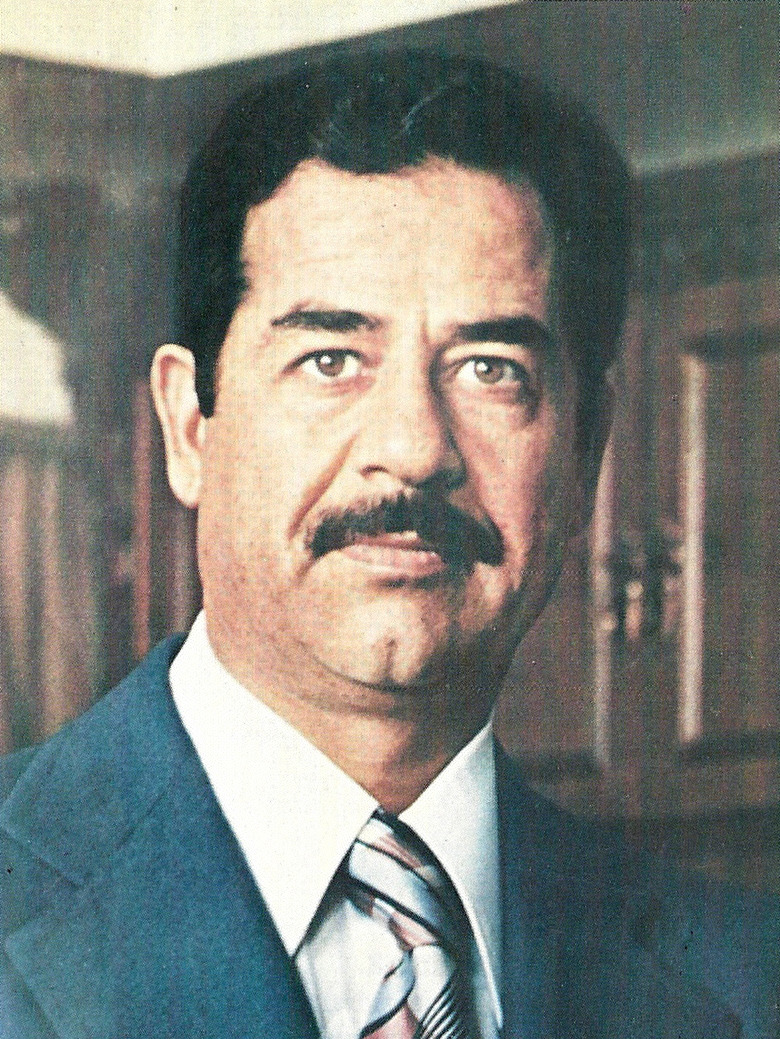
	First party
Leader	Saddam Hussein
Party	Ba'ath Party
Alliance	NPF
Last election	187
Seats won	183
Seat change	▼4
Prime Minister before election
Saddam Hussein
Ba'ath Party
Elected Prime Minister
Saddam Hussein
Ba'ath Party

Parliamentary elections were held in Iraq on 20 October 1984. The elections were contested by 782 candidates, and saw the Ba'ath Party win 183 of the 250 seats.

== Results ==
Party	Votes	%	Seats	+/–
Ba'ath Party			183	–4
Independents and bloc parties			67	+4
Total			250	0
Total votes	7,171,000	–		
Source: Nohlen et al.
