= Mohammed Younis al-Ahmed =

Iraqi politician

Younis al-Ahmed
- محمد يونس الأحمد
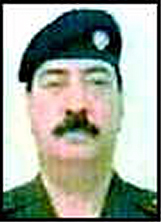

Regional Secretary of the Regional Command of the Iraqi Regional Branch
- Incumbent
- Assumed office 3 January 2007 (in opposition to Izzat Ibrahim al-Douri until 2020)
- Preceded by: Saddam Hussein

Leader of Al-Awda
- Incumbent
- Assumed office June 2003

Governor of the Al-Muthana Governorate
- In office Unknown–1990

Personal details
- Born: 1949 (age 76–77) al-Mowall, Mosul Province, Kingdom of Iraq
- Party: Iraqi Regional Branch of the Arab Socialist Ba'ath Party
- Profession: Military Officer

Military service
- Allegiance: Ba'athist Iraq (to 2003)
- Branch/service: Iraqi Ground Forces (until 2003)
- Rank: Major General
- Unit: Political Guidance Directorate
- Commands: al-Awda (from 2003)
- Battles/wars: Iran–Iraq War; Gulf War; Iraq War; Iraqi insurgency

Mohammed Younis al-Ahmed al-Muwali (Arabic: محمد يونس الأحمد), also known by his pseudonym Khadr al-Sabahi, is an Iraqi former military officer and former senior member of the Iraqi Ba'ath Party. Ahmed currently has a million-dollar bounty placed on his head as one of Iraq's most wanted men accused of funding and leading resistance operations.

He is the leader of al-Awda; an underground Ba'athist movement in Iraq.

== Early life and career in Ba'athist Iraq ==
Ahmed was born in 1949 in al-Mowall in the Kingdom of Iraq's Mosul Province, (Note: The followers of Izzat Ibrahim al-Douri have claimed that Ahmed was "of Shia origins and coming from Shia areas in Nineveh governorate".) and rose in the ranks of the Iraqi Ba'ath Party under the rule of Saddam Hussein. Initially serving in the Iraqi Army's Political Guidance Directorate, which was tasked with ensuring Ba'athist control of the military, Ahmed later became a senior member of the party's Military Bureau.

Though part of the Ba'ath Party's supreme command by the time of the 2003 invasion of Iraq, the United States did not prioritize his capture until months after the fall of the Ba'athist government, inadvertently giving Ahmed enough time to go into hiding.

== Iraqi insurgency ==
A former aide to former President of Iraq and leader Saddam Hussein and a regional Baath Party organizer who it appears was trained in Moscow, following the 2003 Iraq War, he was allegedly one of the leading figures among the Iraqi Insurgency and a major rival to Izzat Ibrahim al-Douri. By 2006, the Iraqi government alleged he was an "operational leader", "financial facilitator" and field commander of the Ba'athist insurgents.

Largely based in Syria since the war, Younis was accused by Iraqi Prime Minister Nouri al-Maliki of having access to substantial funds and that he has been disbursing funds and directing fighting of Sunni insurgents inside Iraq. According to journalists Michael Weiss and Hassan Hassan, Syrian President Bashar al-Assad attempted to make al-Ahmed the leader of the Iraqi Baathist insurgents at some point. However, others reported that his organization, al-Awda has many Shi'ites in the middle level and is attractive to some former Ba’athist Shi'ites from southern Iraq, and it is believed that Shi'ite followers of Younis are active in southern Iraq. Furthermore, it is reported that Younis' organization is focused on securing political rehabilitation, amnesties and the repatriation of Baathist exiles, unlike the Naqshbandi Army which wants to violently overthrow the Iraqi government. According to the United States Department of the Treasury, Younis has lived back and forth between Syria, Iraq and the United Arab Emirates.

On 23 August 2009, the Iraqi government aired a taped of an alleged conversation between two members of the Syria-based Iraqi Ba'athist movement, Sattam Farhan and al-Ahmed, linking them with the August 2009 Baghdad bombings which claimed more than 100 lives. The Syrian Foreign ministry denied Syrian involvement in the attack. On 25 August, Iraq summoned its ambassador to return from Syria, the Syrian government issued a similar order to its ambassador within hours in retaliation. When the Iraqi government demanded in November 2009 that Syria extradite al-Ahmed, President al-Assad refused to do so, claiming that he had already been expelled from Syria. Despite this, Iraqi and American security forces had reported no signs of Baathists illegally crossing the border in the recent months and responsibility for the August bombings was later claimed by the Islamic State of Iraq.

=== Ba'athist Rivalries ===
al-Ahmed was first mentioned in a report in the Iraqi government-owned al-Sabah newspaper, which reported on 6 December 2004 that a captured insurgent, Muayyad Yaseen Aziz, the leader of Jaysh Muhammad, had claimed that Ahmed had recently been elected Secretary of the Iraqi Ba'ath Party at a conference held by a group of Ba'athist fugitives in Al-Hasakah, Syria. Ahmed made another attempt for the party leadership following the death of Saddam Hussein, leading to condemnation from supporters of al-Douri who ordered the expulsion of Ahmed and 150 other members of the party. Ahmed issued a counter-order ordering the expulsion of al-Douri from the party, leading to the creation of two separate wings of the Iraqi Ba'ath Party. Al-Douri issued a statement criticizing Syria and Younis for what al-Douri claimed was an American-supported attempt to undermine the Iraqi Ba'ath party, although this statement was later downplayed.

Ahmed's wing of the party allegedly has contacts with former Republican Guard Commander Ra'ad al-Hamdani, and has also allegedly been in contact with Wafiq Al-Samarrai in an effort to legitimize the party.

Ahmed, in his attempts to reunite the party, and built a close working relationship with the Syrian government, unlike al-Douri, who distrusts the Syrians due to their alliance with the Iranians. The Syrian government is quietly supporting Ahmed in order to gain more control over the Iraqi Ba'ath party. In March 2009 several members representing Younis approached Coalition Forces and the Provincial Reconstruction Team in Saladin Governorate. They met with representatives of the Coalition, instead of representatives of the Iraqi Government, because they claimed the Iraqi government was under Iranian influence, and might seek revenge against any Ba'ath Party members.

Ahmed's attempts to recruit support in Syria from former Iraqi Ba'athists is meeting some success, particularly among the poorer Sunni Arab segment of the refugee population, due in part to Ahmed's ability to offer cash incentives and Syrian residency permits due to their closeness to the Syrian government.

== See also ==
- List of fugitives from justice who disappeared
