= 2000 Iraqi parliamentary election =

- 27 March 2000

All 250 seats in the National Assembly 126 seats needed for a majority
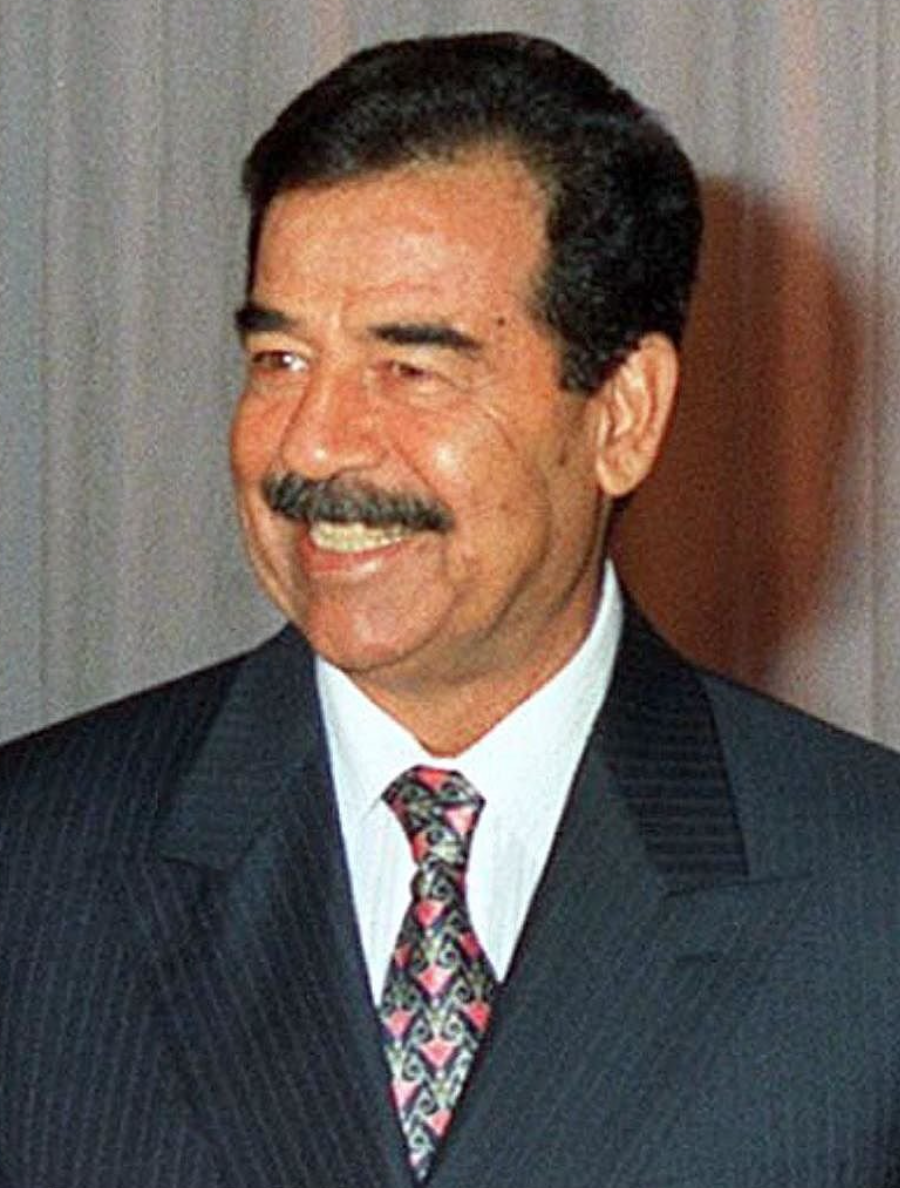
	First party
Leader	Saddam Hussein
Party	Ba'ath Party
Alliance	NPF
Last election	161
Seats won	165
Seat change	▲4
- Seats by governorate Ba'ath Independents Appointed
Prime Minister before election
Saddam Hussein
Ba'ath Party
Elected Prime Minister
Saddam Hussein
Ba'ath Party

Parliamentary elections were held in Iraq on 27 March 2000. The elections were contested by 522 candidates, including 25 women. Whilst there were a number of candidates, all independent candidates were nominally loyal to the Ba'ath Party, and the rest of the candidates were party members.

The Ba'ath Party won 165 of the 250 seats. Of the 85 remaining elected members, 55 were independents, and 30 were appointed by the government to represent the northern Kurdish areas of Sulaymaniyah, Erbil and Duhok, where no elections took place, and which had not been under Iraqi government control since the Gulf War.

== Results ==
Party	Votes	%	Seats	+/–
Ba'ath Party			165	+4
Independents			55	–28
Appointees for Kurdish Provinces			30	New
Total			250	0
Registered voters/turnout	9,200,000	–		
Source: IPU
