= Al-Awda (guerrilla organization) =

Iraqi political party

- العودة
- Leader: Mohammed Younis al-Ahmed
- Dates active: June 2003 – present (largely inactive since 2005)
- Allegiance: Ba'ath Party (Syrian-dominated faction, alleged)
- Active regions: Sunni Triangle, northern Iraq
- Ideology: Iraqi Ba'athism; Pan-Arabism; Saddamism
- Wars: Iraq War: Iraqi insurgency (2003–2011)

Al-Awda (Arabic: العودة; lit. 'The Return') is an Arab socialist political party in Iraq. Al-Awda's name began appearing in Iraq in June 2003 in anti-occupation graffiti and leaflets in Baghdad and to the north and west of the capital. The group is led by Mohammed Younis al-Ahmed, who is based in Syria.

== Organization ==
The party was believed to be a network of underground cells, mainly in the key urban areas, composed of former Ba'ath Party officials, intelligence agents, former members of the Iraqi Republican Guard, and Fedayeen Saddam paramilitaries.

The group was believed to rely on the pre-war organization of the Ba'ath Party and the relationships forged between various individuals and organizations within Saddam Hussein's regime.

== Propaganda and goals ==
The party propaganda indicated that its goal was to restore the regime of Saddam Hussein to power, as the name indicates, and expel multinational occupation forces from the country. Al-Awda is believed is to be the term coined by the insurgents for the Ba'ath Party following the fall of Saddam Hussein from power. The name was chosen for propaganda reasons to raise the threat of the Ba'ath Party's return to power and to evoke the Palestinian struggle against Israel.

In contrast to the JRTN, Ahmed has focused far more on securing political rehabilitation, amnesties and the repatriation of Baathist exiles than the violent overthrow of the Iraqi government.

In his attempts to reunite the party, al-Ahmed built a close working relationship with the Syrian government, unlike al-Douri, who distrusts the Syrians due to their alliance with the Iranians. The Syrian government quietly supports Ahmed to gain more control over the Iraqi Ba'ath party.

Ahmed's attempts to recruit support in Syria from former Iraqi Ba'athists are meeting some success, particularly among the poorer Sunni Arab segment of the refugee population, due in part to Ahmed's ability to offer cash incentives and Syrian residency permits due to their closeness to the Syrian government.

The al-Awda party led by Ahmed is believed to contain most of the remaining leading party figures who were not arrested or executed, including Mezher Motni Awad, To'ma Di'aiyef Getan, Jabbar Haddoosh, Sajer Zubair, and Nihad al-Dulaimi.

It could be said that al-Ahmed has returned to the Ba'ath Party's original ideology of secular pan-Arab nationalism, which, in many cases, has proven successful in Iraq's Shi'a-dominated southern provinces. However, despite his attempts, al-Ahmed failed to overthrow al-Douri. Al-Douri's faction is the largest and the most active on the Internet, and most Ba'athist websites are aligned with al-Douri. Another failure is that al-Ahmed's faction, which is based in Syria, does not have exclusive Syrian support and, considering that it is based in Syria, the party is susceptible to Syrian interference in its affairs. However, despite the differences between the al-Douri and al-Ahmed factions, both adhere to Ba'athist thought.

In contrast to al-Douri's group, al-Ahmed's faction has successfully recruited Shi'as to the party. While al-Ahmed and the faction's senior leaders are Sunnis; there are many Shiites who are working in the organization's middle level. Upon his election as leader, an al-Douri faction statement said he was "of Shia origins and coming from Shia areas in Nineveh governorate". In contrast to al-Ahmed, al-Douri has stuck to a more conservative policy, recruiting members from largely Sunni-dominated areas.

=== Saddam's death and party split: 2006–2011 ===
The al-Awda party has a schism from the wider party, led by al-Douri. Following al-Douri's succession as the Regional Secretary of the Ba'ath Party, Younis al-Ahmed called for a General Conference of the Iraqi Ba'ath party in Syria to elect a new leadership. This move caused a significant amount of controversy within the party, with al-Douri issuing a statement criticizing Syria for what al-Douri claimed was an American-supported attempt to undermine the Iraqi Ba'ath party, although this statement was later downplayed. The conference elected al-Ahmed as Secretary-general, and al-Ahmed issued an order expelling al-Douri from the party, resulting in al-Douri issuing a counter order expelling al-Ahmed and 150 other party members. These events led to the existence, in effect, of two Iraqi Ba'ath Parties: the main party led by al-Douri, and the splinter al-Awda party led by al-Ahmed. It's been rumoured that al-Awda has fought on the side of Bashar Al-Assad in the Syrian civil war

=== Attempts at reconciliation ===
According to leaked diplomatic cables, in March 2009, several members of the former Ba'athist government claiming to represent the Mohammed Younis al-Ahmed led faction of the Ba'ath party approached Coalition Forces and the Provincial Reconstruction Team in Saladin Governorate. The figures met with representatives of the Coalition instead of representatives of the Iraqi Government because they claimed the Iraqi government was under Iranian influence and might seek revenge against any Ba'ath Party members.

The representatives claimed that the Younis-led faction was dissatisfied with the present government of Iraq, which they claimed was sectarian and failed to provide infrastructure and public services. The representatives claimed that the Younis-led faction wasn't opposed to democracy and wished to participate peacefully in the democratic process. They also claimed that unlike the al-Douri-led faction, they recognized that the pre-2003 Ba'athist government had made many mistakes and that Iraq could not return to that system of government.

=== Government crackdowns ===
In December 2008, some 25 security officials were arrested for membership in Awda and attempting to restore the Ba'ath party, with some claiming they were planning a coup. The actual number of those involved may have reached 35, and included both Sunnis and Shiites and high-ranking generals at the Interior Ministry, some of whom Awda had allegedly recruited through bribery.

An Awda party senior official was arrested in a crackdown on the organization in Baaquba, Diyala, on 2 July 2010.

In October 2011, Iraqi security figures announced that they had detained 350 members of the Awda party in a large operation across several provinces. The government claimed the group had been trying to reorganize the Ba'ath party, and work to undermine stability in the country, with a mind to seizing power following the US withdrawal the following year. The group appeared to be quite active in Nasiriyah, with 36 Ba'ath party leaders arrested there.
