= 1989 Iraqi parliamentary election =

- 1 April 1989

All 250 seats in the National Assembly 126 seats needed for a majority
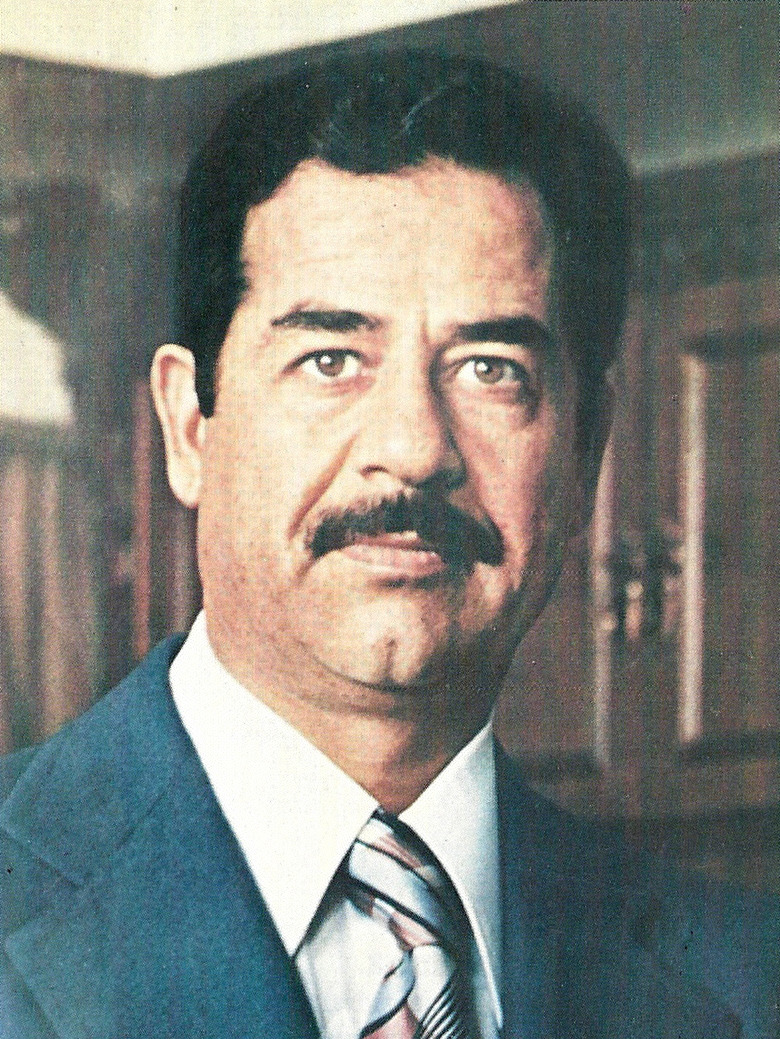
	First party
Leader	Saddam Hussein
Party	Ba'ath Party
Alliance	NPF
Last election	183
Seats won	207
Seat change	▲24
Prime Minister before election
Saddam Hussein
Ba'ath Party
Elected Prime Minister
Saddam Hussein
Ba'ath Party

Parliamentary elections were held in Iraq on 1 April 1989, having originally been scheduled for 31 August 1988, but postponed due to the Iran–Iraq War. The elections were contested by 921 candidates, and saw the Ba'ath Party win 207 of the 250 seats.

== Results ==
Party	Seats	+/–
Ba'ath Party	207	+24
Independents and bloc parties	43	–24
Total	250	0
Source: IPU
