= Popular Unity Party (Iraq) =

Popular Unity Party حزب الوحدة الشعبية
- Abbreviation: CPI (as Communist Party of Iraq); PUP (as Popular Unity Party)
- Leader: Youssif Hamdan
- Founder: Youssif Hamdan
- Founded: 1995 (as the Communist Party of Iraq)
- Dissolved: around 2003 (as the CPI)
- Split from: Iraqi Communist Party
- Ideology: Communism; Saddamism; Arab socialism Pan-Arabism; Marxism; Secularism; Ba'athism; Anti-imperialism; Anti-Zionism
- Political position: Left-wing
- National affiliation: National Progressive Front (de facto)

The Popular Unity Party was a political party in Iraq led by Youssif Hamdan. It was founded in 1995 and was initially known as the Communist Party of Iraq (CPI). The CPI split away from the Iraqi Communist Party during the latter period of Saddam Hussein's regime. Many saw the CPI as a puppet party of the regime, whose existence would give the outside world an impression that the country was a multi-party state. The party met with foreign delegations visiting Iraq. It seemed the intentions of the party would have been to join the government as a junior partner within the National Progressive Front, similar to the coalition of the same name set-up in neighbouring Syria, but the idea was later discarded. The CPI was never given possibility to register as a legal party, though its leader was in the Iraqi parliament as of 2001.

Following the fall of the Saddam's regime in 2003, the party was reconstructed as the Popular Unity Party.
