= 1980 Iraqi parliamentary election =

- 20 June 1980

All 250 seats in the National Assembly 126 seats needed for a majority
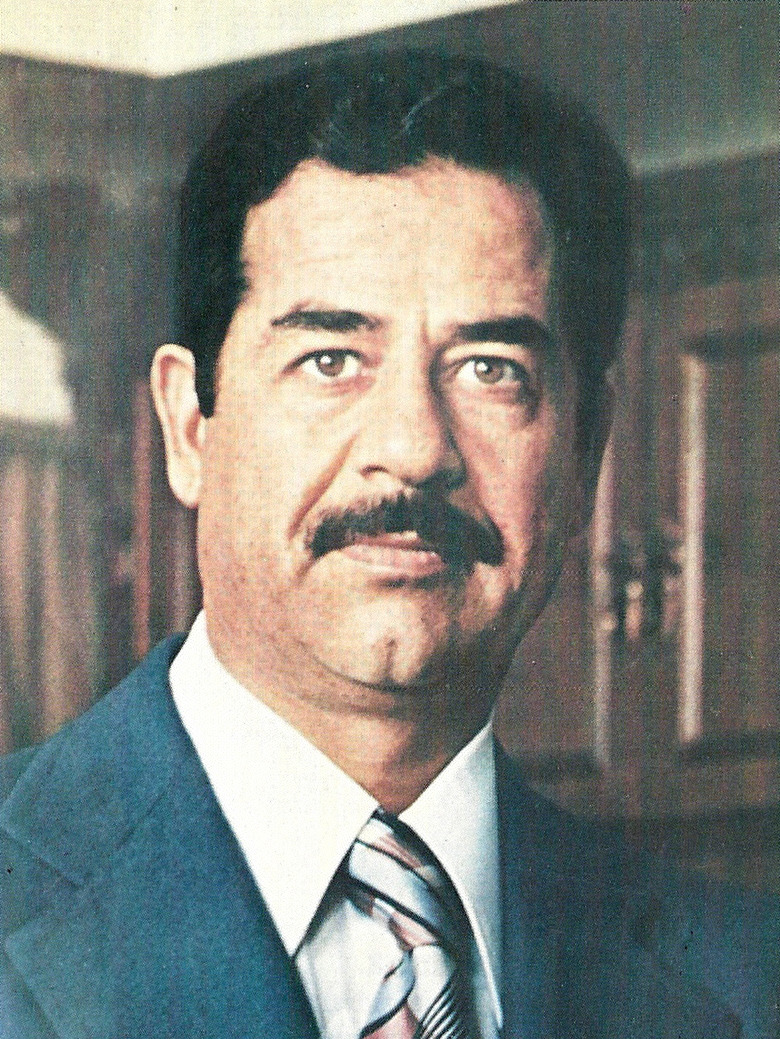
	First party
Leader	Saddam Hussein
Party	Ba'ath Party
Alliance	NPF
Seats won	187
Prime Minister before election
Saddam Hussein
Ba'ath Party
Elected Prime Minister
Saddam Hussein
Ba'ath Party

Parliamentary elections were held in Iraq on 20 June 1980, the first since 1958. The elections were contested by around 860 candidates and saw the Ba'ath Party win 187 of the 250 seats. Voter turnout was approximately 80%.

== Results ==
Party	Votes	%	Seats
Ba'ath Party			187
Independents and bloc parties			63
Total			250
Registered voters/turnout	6,044,068	–	
Source: Nohlen et al.
