= Kurdistan Revolutionary Party =

Kurdistan Revolutionary Party الحزب الثوري الكردستاني
- Abbreviation: KRP
- Leader: Abd as-Sattar Tahir Sharif
- Founded: 1964 (first incarnation) 1974 (second incarnation)
- Split from: Kurdish Democratic Party (1964, 1974)
- Merged into: Kurdish Democratic Party (1970 to 1974)
- Armed wing: Jash (KRP-controlled factions)
- Ideology: Kurdish nationalism Socialism; Secularism; Regionalism; Federalism; Iraqi-Kurdish integration
- Political position: Left-wing
- National affiliation: National Progressive Front

Party flag

The Kurdistan Revolutionary Party (Arabic: الحزب الثوري الكردستاني) was a political party in Iraq seeking independence for the Kurdish people. Originally formed in 1964, it merged into the Kurdish Democratic Party in 1970. The party was revived by a group of anti-Barzani dissidents in the KDP leadership in 1974. The refounded Kurdish Revolutionary Party joined the National Progressive Front and supported the Kurdish autonomy law proposed by the Iraqi government. The party was led by Abd as-Sattar Tahir Sharif, who left Iraq in 1999.

The party obtained two seats in the national parliament in the March 24, 1996, elections. By 2003, the US-led invasion had the Ba’ath party, which led the National Progressive Front, dissolved. This, by proxy, dissolved the entire National Progressive Front.

The party held its 14th national congress on August 21, 2000.
