= Tribal Criminal and Civil Disputes Regulation =

The Tribal Criminal and Civil Disputes Regulation (TCCDR) was a legal code introduced by the British in Iraq in 1916. The TCCDR was incorporated into the Iraqi Constitution in 1925. The regulation gave significant tax-levying and judicial powers to the Hashemite monarchy.
