= Arab Socialist Ba'ath Party – Iraq Region =

Post-split Iraqi Ba'athist political party

Arab Socialist Baʿth Party – Iraq Region Arabic: حزب البعث العربي الاشتراكي في العراق
- Governing body: Regional Command
- Secretary: Mohammed Younis al-Ahmed (Note: Disputed with Salah Al-Mukhtar since 2020)
- Founder: Fuad al-Rikabi
- Founded: Late 1940s or early 1950s
- Banned: 16 May 2003; 23 years ago
- Headquarters: Green Zone, Baghdad
- Newspaper: Al-Thawra
- Paramilitary wing: People's Militia (1970–1991); Fedayeen Saddam (1995–2003)
- Membership: ▲1.5 million (2003 est.); 102,900 (2013 est.)
- Ideology: Ba'athism (Iraqi); Saddamism (from 1979) (Note: From 22 July 1979; see the Ba'ath Party Purge)
- Political position: Left-wing (disputed)
- National affiliation: National Union Front (until 1958); Progressive Front (until 2003)
- Regional affiliation: See full list: Ba'ath Party (until 1966); Pro-Iraqi Ba'ath Party (from 1966); PSOM/CSDM (historical)
- Slogan: "Unity, Freedom, Socialism"; "A single Arab nation with an eternal message"
- Anthem: "The Torch of the Ba'ath"

Party flag

Website
- Statements of the Arab Socialist Ba'ath Party

The Arab Socialist Ba'ath Party – Iraq Region, (Note: (Arabic: حزب البعث العربي الاشتراكي في العراق, romanized: Ḥizb al-Ba‘th al-'Arabī al-Ishtirākī fī al-'Irāq)) officially the Iraqi Regional Branch, was the Iraqi regional branch of the pan-Arab Ba'ath Party, founded in the early 1950s and officially brought to power through the 1968 coup d'état. Rooted in the ideology of Ba'athism, the party combined Arab nationalism, Arab socialism, republicanism, and anti-imperialism, though it developed a distinctive Iraqi character under Saddam Hussein's leadership, often referred to as Saddamist Ba'athism.

From 1968 to 2003, the Ba'ath Party dominated Iraq's political landscape, exerting total control over state institutions, the military, and society through an extensive and often brutal internal security network. It facilitated Saddam Hussein's rise to absolute power in 1979 and played a central role in shaping Iraq's domestic and foreign policies, including the Iran–Iraq War, the invasion of Kuwait, and the Gulf War. Following the U.S.-led invasion of Iraq in 2003, the Ba'ath Party was officially banned by the Coalition Provisional Authority, and thousands of its members were purged from public life in a controversial policy known as de-Ba'athification. Despite the ban, remnants of the party reorganized underground and splintered into factions, most notably those led by Izzat Ibrahim al-Douri and Mohammed Younis al-Ahmed.

The party’s legacy remains controversial due to its role in authoritarian governance, sectarian repression, and widespread human rights abuses. While officially dissolved and criminalized by Iraq's 2005 Constitution, Ba'athist ideologies continue to influence insurgent movements and political discourse in Iraq and the wider Arab world.

== History ==
=== Early years and 14 July Revolution: 1951–1958 ===
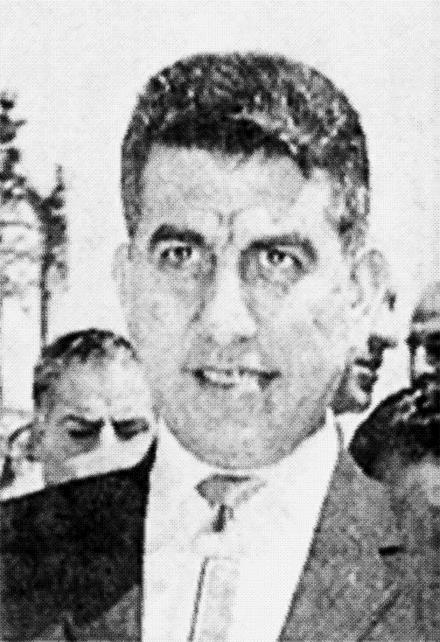
Rikabi was one of the leading figures in early Ba'athist history.

The Iraqi Regional Branch of the Ba'ath Party was established in 1951 or 1952. Some historians claim that the Iraqi Regional Branch was established by Abd ar Rahman ad Damin and Abd al Khaliq al Khudayri in 1947 after their return from the founding congress of the Ba'ath Party held in Damascus, Syria the same year. In another version, Fuad al-Rikabi established the Iraqi Regional Branch in 1948 with Sa'dun Hammadi but became secretary of the Regional Command in 1952.

The Iraqi Regional Branch was Arab nationalist and vague in its socialist orientation. Al-Rikabi, expelled from the party in 1961 for being a Nasserist, was an early follower of Michel Aflaq, the founder of Ba'athism. During the party's early days, members discussed topics regarding Arab nationalism, the social inequalities that had grown out of the British "Tribal Criminal and Civil Disputes Regulation", and the Iraqi Parliament's Law 28 of 1932 "Governing the Rights and Duties of Cultivators". By 1953, the party, led by al-Rikabi, was engaged in subversive activities against the government.

The party initially consisted of a majority of Shia Muslims, as al-Rikabi primarily recruited his friends and family, but it slowly became Sunni-dominated. The Ba'ath Party, and others of pan-Arab orientation, found it increasingly difficult to recruit Shia members within the party organisation. Most Shias saw pan-Arab as largely Sunni, since most Arabs are Sunni. As a result, more Shias joined the Iraqi Communist Party than the Ba'ath Party. In the mid-1950s, eight of 17 members of the Ba'ath leadership were Shia.

According to Talib El-Shibib, the Ba'ath foreign minister in the Ahmed Hassan al-Bakr government, the sectarian background of the leading Ba'ath members was considered of little importance because most Ba'athists did not know each other's sectarian denominations. Between 1952 and 1963, 54% of the members of the Ba'ath Regional Command were Shia Muslims, largely because of al-Rikabi's effective recruitment drive in Shia areas. Between 1963 and 1970, after al-Rikabi's resignation, Shia representation in the Regional Command had fallen to 14 percent. However, of the three factions within the Ba'ath Party, two out of three faction leaders were Shia.

By the end of 1951, the party had at least 50 members. With the collapse of the pan-Arabist United Arab Republic (UAR), several leading Ba'ath members, including al-Rikabi, resigned from the party in protest. In 1958, the year of the 14 July Revolution that overthrew the Hashemite monarchy, the Ba'ath Party had 300 members nationwide. Brigadier Abd al-Karim Qasim, the leader of the Free Officers Movement which overthrew the king, supported joining the UAR, but changed his position when he took power. Several members of the Free Officer Movement were also members of the Ba'ath Party. The Ba'ath Party considered the President of Egypt Gamal Abdel Nasser, the leader of the pan-Arab movement, to be the leader most likely to succeed, and supported Iraq's joining the union. Of the 16 members of Qasim's cabinet, 12 were Ba'ath Party members. However, the Ba'ath Party supported Qasim on the grounds that he would join Nasser's UAR.

=== Qasim's Iraq: 1958–1963 ===
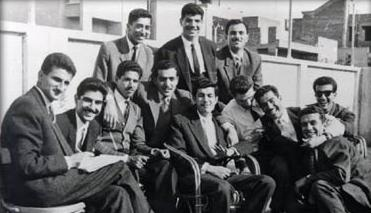
Saddam Hussein and the Ba'ath Party student cell, Cairo, in the period 1959–1963

Qasim, reluctant to tie himself too closely to Nasser's Egypt, sided with various groups within Iraq (notably the social democrats) that told him such an action would be dangerous. Instead Qasim adopted a wataniyah policy of "Iraq First". To strengthen his own position within the government, Qasim created an alliance with the Iraqi Communist Party, which was opposed to the notion of pan-Arabism.

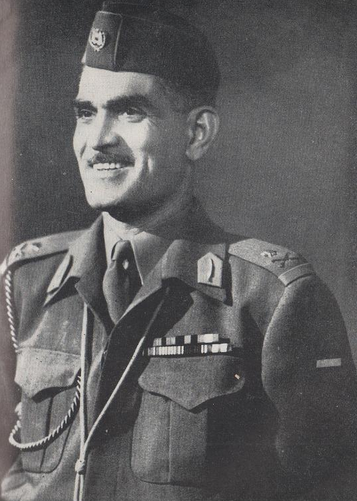
Brigadier Abd al-Karim Qasim in 1959

Qasim's policies angered several pan-Arab organisations, including the Ba'ath Party, which later began plotting to assassinate Qasim at Al-Rashid Street on 7 October 1959 and take power. One assassin was to kill those sitting in the back of the car, the rest would kill those in front. Abdul Karim al-Shaikhly, the leader of the assassination plot, recruited a young Saddam Hussein to join the conspiracy after one of the would-be assassins left. During the ambush, Saddam (who was only supposed to provide cover) began shooting prematurely, which disorganised the whole operation. Qasim's chauffeur was killed and Qasim was hit in the arm and shoulder. The assassins thought they had killed him and quickly retreated to their headquarters, but Qasim survived.

Richard Sale of United Press International (UPI), citing former U.S. diplomat and intelligence officials, Adel Darwish, and other experts, reported that the unsuccessful 7 October 1959 assassination attempt on Qasim involving a young Saddam Hussein and other Ba'athist conspirators was a collaboration between the CIA and Egyptian intelligence. Pertinent contemporary records relating to CIA operations in Iraq have remained classified or heavily redacted, thus "allow[ing] for plausible deniability." It is generally accepted that Egypt, in some capacity, was involved in the assassination attempt, and that "[t]he United States was working with Nasser on some level." Sale and Darwish's account has been disputed by historian Bryan R. Gibson who concludes that available U.S. declassified documents show that "while the United States was aware of several plots against Qasim, it had still adhered to [a] nonintervention policy." On the other hand, historian Kenneth Osgood writes that "the circumstantial evidence is such that the possibility of US–UAR collaboration with Ba'ath Party activists cannot be ruled out," concluding that "[w]hatever the validity of [Sale's] charges, at the very least currently declassified documents reveal that US officials were actively considering various plots against Qasim and that the CIA was building up assets for covert operations in Iraq." The assassins, including Saddam, escaped to Cairo, Egypt "where they enjoyed Nasser's protection for the remainder of Qasim's tenure in power."

At the time of the attack, the Ba'ath Party had less than 1,000 members, however the failed assassination attempt led to widespread exposure for Saddam and the Ba'ath within Iraq, where both had previously languished in obscurity, and later became a crucial part of Saddam's public image during his tenure as president of Iraq. The Iraqi government arrested some members of the operation and took them into custody. At the show trial, six of the defendants were sentenced to death and, for unknown reasons, the sentences were not carried out. Aflaq, the leader of the Ba'athist movement, organised the expulsion of leading Iraqi Ba'athist members, such as Fuad al-Rikabi, on the grounds that the party should not have initiated the attempt on Qasim's life. At the same time, Aflaq secured seats in the Iraqi Ba'ath leadership for his supporters, including Saddam.

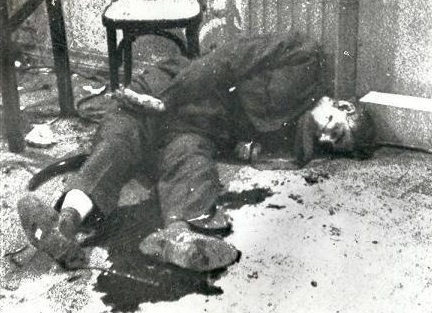
Qasim was executed by the Ba'athists inside the Iraqi Ministry of Defence building; the Ba'athists desecrated his corpse on Iraqi television.

In 1962, both the Ba'ath Party and the United States Central Intelligence Agency (CIA) began plotting to overthrow Qasim. On 8 February 1963, Qasim was finally overthrown by the Ba'athists in the Ramadan Revolution; long suspected to be supported by the CIA, however pertinent contemporary documents relating to the CIA's operations in Iraq have remained classified by the U.S. government, although the Iraqi Ba'athists are documented to have maintained supportive relationships with U.S. officials before, during, and after the coup. Several army units refused to support the Ba'athist coup. The fighting lasted for two days, during which 1,500–5,000 were killed. Qasim was captured on 9 February and, an hour later, was killed by firing squad. To assure the Iraqi public that Qasim was dead, as well as to terrorize his supporters, the Ba'athists broadcast a five minute long propaganda video called The End of the Criminals of Qasim's corpse being desecrated. Upon the Ba'athist ascension to power, Saddam would return to Iraq after spending nearly three years living in exile, becoming a key organizer within the Ba'ath Party's civilian wing.

In its ascension to power, the Ba'athists "methodically hunted down Communists" thanks to "mimeographed lists [...] complete with home addresses and auto license plate numbers," and while it is unlikely that the Ba'athists would've needed assistance in identifying Iraqi communists, it is widely believed that the CIA provided the Ba'athist National Guard with lists of communists and other leftists, who were then arrested or killed. Gibson emphasizes that the Ba'athists compiled their own lists, citing Bureau of Intelligence and Research reports. On the other hand, historians Nathan Citino and Brandon Wolfe-Hunnicutt consider the assertions plausible because the U.S. embassy in Iraq had actually compiled such lists, were known to be in contact with the National Guard during the purge, and because National Guard members involved in the purge received training in the U.S. Furthermore, Wolfe-Hunnicutt, citing contemporary U.S. counterinsurgency doctrine, notes that the assertions "would be consistent with American special warfare doctrine" regarding U.S. covert support to anti-communist "Hunter-Killer" teams "seeking the violent overthrow of a communist dominated and supported government", and draws parallels to other CIA operations in which lists of suspected communists were compiled, such as Guatemala in 1954 and Indonesia in 1965–66.

=== In power: February–September 1963 ===
Abdul Salam Arif became the president of Iraq and Ahmed Hassan al-Bakr became prime minister after taking power in February 1963. Ali Salih al-Sa'di, secretary-general of the Regional Command of the Iraqi Ba'ath Party, became deputy prime minister and Minister of Interior – a post he lost on 11 May. Despite not being prime minister, al-Sadi had effective control over the Iraqi Ba'ath Party. Seven out of nine members supported his leadership in the party's Regional Command.

According to Coughlin, in the aftermath of the coup, the National Guard initiated an "orgy of violence" against all communist and other left-wing elements. This period led to the establishment in Baghdad of several interrogation chambers. The government requisitioned several private houses and public facilities, and an entire section of Kifah Street was used by the National Guard. Many of the victims of the rout were innocent, or were victims of personal vendettas. According to Coughlin, the most notorious torture chamber was located at the "Palace of the End," where the royal family was killed in 1958. Nadhim Kazzer, who became director of the Directorate of General Security, was responsible for the acts committed there.

The party was ousted from government in November 1963, due to factionalism. The question within the Ba'ath Party was whether or not it would pursue its ideological goal of establishing a union with Syria, Egypt or both. Al-Sadi supported a union with Syria, which was ruled by the Ba'ath Party, while the more conservative military wing supported Qasim's "Iraq first policy". Factionalism and the ill-disciplined behaviour of the National Guard led the military wing to initiate a coup against the party's leadership. Al-Sadi was forced into exile in Spain.

Al-Bakr, in an attempt to save the party, called for a meeting of the National Command of the Ba'ath Party. The meeting exacerbated the party's problems. Aflaq, who saw himself as the leader of the pan-Arab Ba'athist movement, declared his intent to take control of the Iraqi Ba'ath Party. The "Iraq first" wing was outraged. President Arif lost patience with the Iraqi Ba'ath Party, and the party was ousted from government on 18 November 1963. The 12 Ba'ath members of the government were forced to resign, and the National Guard was dissolved and replaced with the Republican Guard. Some authorities believe that Aflaq supported Arif's coup against the Ba'athist government in order to weaken al-Sadi's position within the party and strengthen his own.

==== Union talks with Syria ====
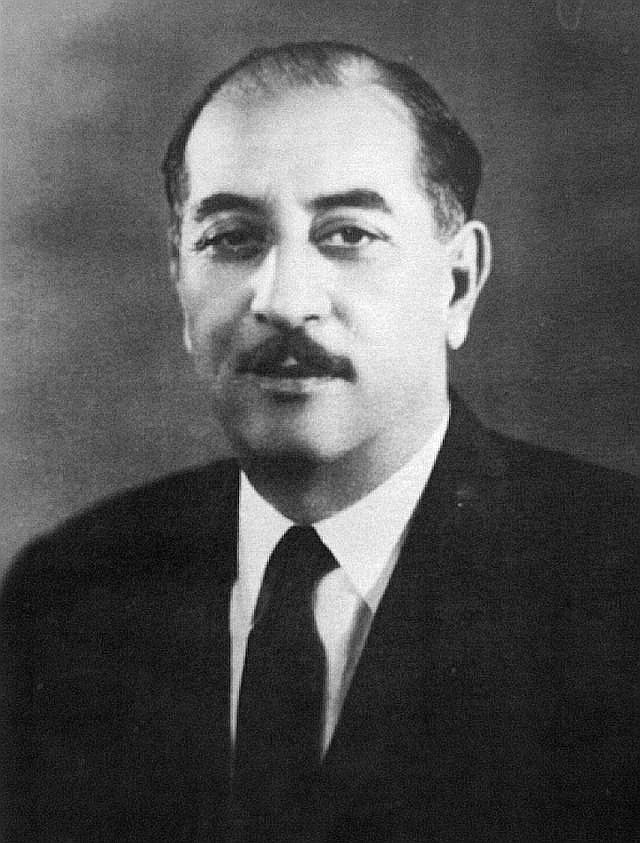
Ahmed Hassan al-Bakr, as seen in 1974, led the Ba'athist coups of 1963 and 1968.

At the time of al-Sadi's removal from the post of Interior Minister, factionalism and discontent were growing within the party. al-Sadi and Mundur al-Windawi, the leader of the Ba'ath Party's National Guard, led the civilian wing. President Arif led the military wing and Talib El-Shibib led the pro-Aflaq wing. However, a bigger schism was underway in the international Ba'athist movement. Four major factions were being created: the Old Guard led by Aflaq; a civilian alliance between the secretaries-general of the Regional Commands of Syria and Iraq, led by Hammud al-Shufi and al-Sadi respectively; the Syrian Ba'ath Military Committee, represented by Salah Jadid, Muhammad Umran, Hafez al-Assad, Salim Hatum and Amin al-Hafiz; and the Iraqi military wing, which supported Arif's presidency, represented by al-Bakr, Salih Mahdi Ammash, Tahir Yahya and Hardan Tikriti. The military wings in Syria and Iraq opposed the creation of a pan-Arab state, whereas al-Shufi and al-Sadi supported it. Aflaq officially supported it, but privately opposed it because he was afraid al-Sadi would challenge his position as secretary-general of the National Command of the Ba'ath Party, the leader of the international Ba'athist movement.

==== Bilateral union ====
Both Syria and Iraq were under Ba'athist rule in 1963. When President Arif visited Syria on a state visit, Sami al-Jundi, a Syrian cabinet minister, proposed the creation of a bilateral union between the two countries. Both Arif and Amin al-Hafiz, President of Syria, supported the idea. al-Jundi was given the task of setting up a committee to begin establishing the union. al-Jundi selected al-Sadi as Iraq's chief representative in the committee in a bid to strengthen al-Sadi's position within the Ba'ath Party.

Work on the union continued with the signing of the Military Unity Charter which established the Higher Military Council, an organ which oversaw the integration and control over the Syrian and Iraqi military. Ammash, the Iraqi Minister of Defence, became the chairman of the Higher Military Council. The unified headquarters was in Syria. The establishment of the military union became evident on 20 October 1963, when Syrian soldiers were found fighting alongside the Iraqi military in Iraqi Kurdistan. At this stage, both Iraqi and Syrian Ba'athists feared excluding Nasser from the union talks since he had a large following.

The Syrian state and its Ba'ath Party criticised the fall of al-Bakr's first government but relented when they discovered that some members of the Iraqi cabinet were Ba'ath Party members. However, the remaining Ba'athists were slowly removed from office. The Syrian Revolutionary Command Council responded by abrogating the Military Unity Charter on 26 April 1964, ending the bilateral unification process between Iraq and Syria.

=== Underground: 1963–1968 ===
In the aftermath of the coup-led against the Ba'ath Party, al-Bakr became the party's dominant driving force and was elected secretary-general of the Regional Command in 1964. Saddam Hussein received full party membership and a seat in the Regional Command of the Iraqi Ba'ath Party because he was a close protege of al-Bakr. With al-Bakr's consent, Hussein initiated a drive to improve the party's internal security. In 1964, Hussein established the Jihaz Haneen, the party's secretive security apparatus, to act as a counterweight to the military officers in the party and to weaken the military's hold on the party.

=== Ba'athist Iraq: 1968–2003 ===
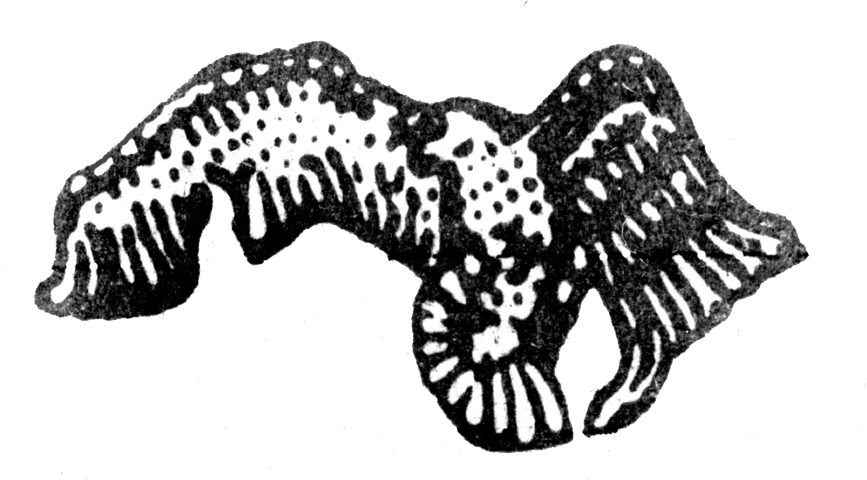
The Eagle of Saladin served as the logo of the Baathist newspaper Ath-Thawra.

In contrast to the coup of 1963, the 1968 coup was led by civilian Ba'ath Party members. According to historian Con Coughlin, the President of Iraq Abdul Rahman Arif, who had taken over from his brother, was a weak leader. Before the coup, Hussein, through the Jihaz Haneen, contacted several military officers who either supported the Ba'ath Party or wanted to use it as a vehicle to power. Some officers, such as Hardan al-Tikriti, were already members of the party, while Abdul Razzak al-Naif, the deputy head of military intelligence, and Colonel Ibrahim Daud, the commander of the Republican Guard, were neither party members nor sympathisers.

On 16 July 1968, al-Naif and Daud were summoned to the Presidential Palace by Arif, who asked them if they knew of an imminent coup against him. Both al-Naif and Daud denied knowledge of any coup. However, when the Ba'ath Party leadership obtained this information, they quickly convened a meeting at al-Bakr's house. The coup had to be initiated as quickly as possible, even if they had to concede to give al-Naif and Daud the posts of Prime Minister and Defence Minister, respectively. Hussein said at the meeting, "I am aware that the two officers have been imposed on us and that they want to stab the party in the back in the service of some interest or other, but we have no choice. We should collaborate with them and liquidate immediately during, or after, the revolution. And I volunteer to carry out the task".

The 17 July Revolution was a military coup, not a popular revolt against the incumbent government. According to Coughlin, compared to the coups of 1958 and 1963, the 1968 coup was a "relatively civil affair". The coup begun in the early morning of 17 July, when the military and Ba'ath Party activists seized several key positions in Baghdad, such as the headquarters of the Ministry of Defence, television and radio stations and the electricity station. All the city's bridges were captured, all telephone lines were cut and at exactly 03:00, the order was given to march on the Presidential Palace. President Arif was asleep and had no control over the situation. al-Bakr masterminded the plot, but Hussein and Saleh Omar al-Ali led operations on the ground. A power struggle began between the Ba'ath Party led by al-Naif and the military led by Daud, which al-Bakr had anticipated and planned. Daud lost his ministership during an official visit to Jordan, while al-Naif was exiled after Hussein threatened him and his family with death.

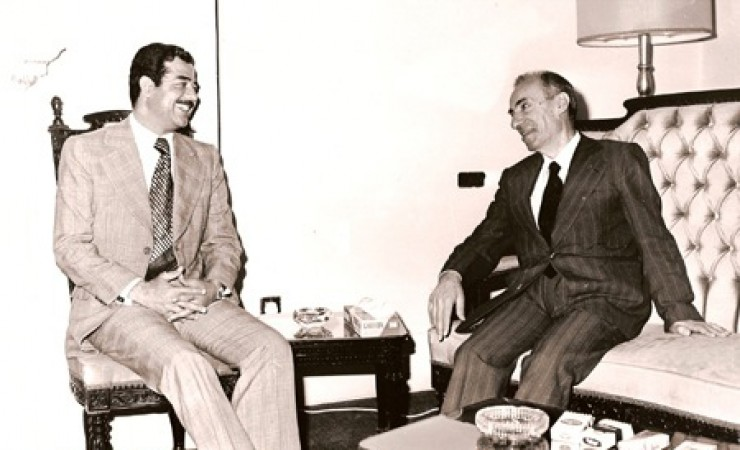
Iraqi President Saddam Hussein with Ba'ath Party founder Michel Aflaq in 1979

At the time of the 1968 coup, only 5,000 people were members; by the late 1970s, membership had increased to 1.2 million. In 1974, the Iraqi Ba'athists formed the National Progressive Front to broaden support for the government's initiatives. Wrangling within the party continued, and the government periodically purged its dissident members, including Fuad al-Rikabi, the party's first secretary-general of the Regional Command. Emerging as the party strongman, Hussein used his growing power to push al-Bakr aside in 1979 and ruled Iraq until the 2003 Invasion of Iraq.

Several major infrastructures were laid down to assist the country's growth, and the Iraqi oil industry was nationalised with help from the Soviet Union. Alexei Kosygin, Chairman of the USSR Council of Ministers, signed the bilateral Treaty of Friendship and Cooperation in 1972.

In July 1979, Saddam Hussein formally assumed the presidency of Iraq, succeeding Ahmed Hassan al-Bakr, thereby consolidating his authority over both the state apparatus and the Iraqi Regional Branch of the Arab Socialist Ba'ath Party. Although al-Bakr had long functioned as a key figure in Iraq’s post-1968 political structure, Hussein effectively marginalized potential rivals through a systematic purge of the party’s upper echelons shortly after taking office.

Under Hussein’s leadership, the Ba'ath Party evolved into a centralized instrument of governance, characterized by hierarchical control, ideological indoctrination, and increasing personalist rule. The Iran–Iraq War (1980–1988) marked a turning point in the party’s development, as it mobilized nationalistic and pan-Arab sentiment to justify an extended and costly military campaign. During this period, the party apparatus played a crucial role in disseminating state propaganda and managing internal dissent, particularly in the Kurdish regions, where counterinsurgency operations included the controversial al-Anfal Campaign—an effort widely condemned for its extensive human rights violations, including the use of chemical weapons.

Following the 1991 Gulf War, internal uprisings in southern and northern Iraq posed significant challenges to Ba'athist authority. The regime responded with decisive military and security crackdowns. Concurrently, the party initiated the Faith Campaign, a state-directed program aimed at reconciling Ba'athist ideology with Islamic values, despite the movement's traditionally secular orientation. The campaign sought to cultivate religious legitimacy and mitigate growing Islamist opposition. During the 1990s, the party’s internal structures became increasingly militarized and subordinated to Hussein’s personal authority. In 1995, the establishment of the Fedayeen Saddam, a paramilitary organization reporting directly to the presidency, exemplified the regime’s intensifying reliance on coercive institutions to maintain political stability and control.

Although official estimates placed party membership at approximately 1.5 million by 2003, such figures must be interpreted within the context of an authoritarian system in which political affiliation often functioned as a prerequisite for access to education, employment, and advancement within state institutions. Consequently, the party operated not only as an ideological vanguard, but also as a mechanism of patronage and surveillance. The U.S.-led invasion of Iraq in March 2003 brought an abrupt end to Ba'athist rule. In May of that year, the Coalition Provisional Authority issued Order Number 1, formally dissolving the Ba'ath Party and implementing a broad policy of de-Ba'athification. This decree barred individuals affiliated with the party’s upper echelons from holding public office, a move that generated significant controversy due to its wide-reaching impact on Iraq’s professional and administrative sectors.

=== 2003 invasion and new Iraqi government ===
==== Downfall and de-Ba'athification ====
At the time of Saddam's fall in April 2003, the Ba'ath Party had 1.5 million members. In June 2003, the U.S.-led Coalition Provisional Authority banned the Ba'ath Party, and banned all members of the party's top four tiers from the new government and from public schools and colleges, a move which some criticised for blocking too many experienced people from participating in the new government. Thousands were removed from their positions, including doctors, professors, school teachers and bureaucrats. Many teachers lost their jobs, causing protests and demonstrations at schools and universities.

Under the Ba'ath Party, one could not reach high positions in the government or in schools without becoming a party member. Membership was also a prerequisite for university admission. While many Ba'athists joined for ideological reasons, many more joined as a way to improve their options. After much pressure by the U.S., the policy of de-Ba'athification was addressed by the Iraqi government in January 2008 in the highly controversial "Accountability and Justice Act," which was supposed to ease the policy, but which many feared would lead to further dismissals.

The new Constitution of Iraq, approved by a referendum on 15 October 2005, reaffirmed the Ba'ath Party ban, stating that "No entity or program, under any name, may adopt racism, terrorism, the calling of others infidels, ethnic cleansing, or incite, facilitate, glorify, promote, or justify thereto, especially the Saddamist Ba'ath in Iraq and its symbols, regardless of the name that it adopts. This may not be part of the political pluralism in Iraq."

Some or many of its members in the Iraqi Ba'ath Party who were purged and dismissed went on to join Al-Qaeda in Iraq which eventually morphed into the Islamic State of Iraq and the Levant.

==== Saddam's death and party split: 2006–present ====
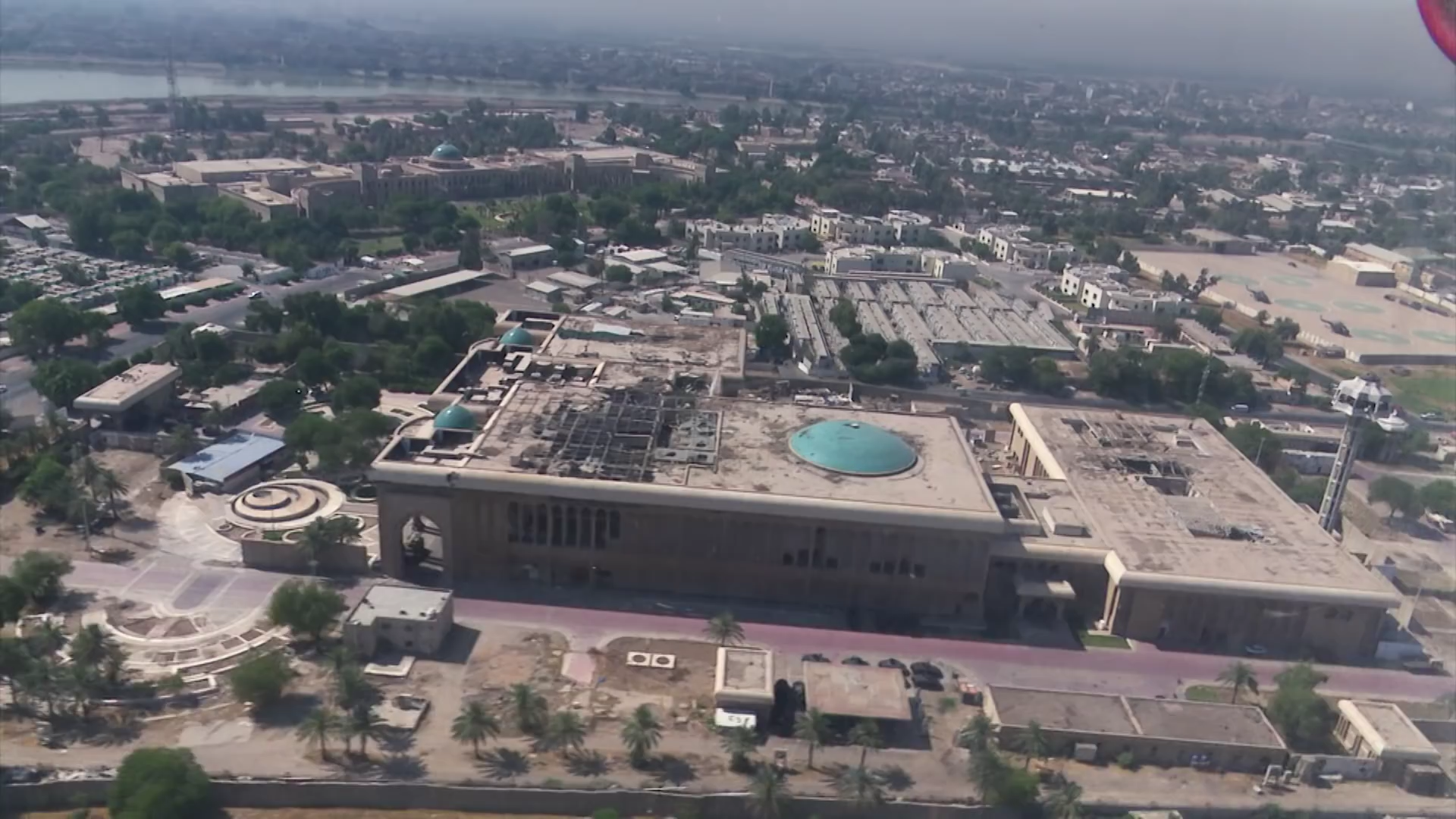
The damaged former Arab Socialist Ba'ath Party Headquarters, Green Zone, 2020

On 31 December 2006, one day after Saddam Hussein's execution by hanging, a previously unknown group called the Baghdad Citizens Gathering publicly issued a statement in Amman, Jordan, at the Jordanian Regional Branch of the Ba'ath Party endorsing Izzat Ibrahim al-Douri as the new president of Iraq and the party's secretary-general following Saddam's death. The statement referred to Iraqis killed in the 1980–88 war with Iran, the 1991 Gulf War over Kuwait and the 13 years of sanctions afterwards, and went on to say, "We vow to liberate our country from the heinous criminals, neo-Zionists and the Persians in order to restore Iraq's unity". The party's armed wing since al-Douri's ascension is the Army of the Men of the Naqshbandi Order.

According to Abu Muhammad, a Ba'ath Party spokesman from al-Douri's faction, on the eve of Saddam's death, "Comrade Izzat has been leading the [Ba'ath] party's political and resistance factions since 2003, but it is a matter of protocol and internal regulation to appoint him officially as the party's secretary-general." Al-Douri was elected the party's secretary-general in early January.

Despite al-Douri's succession, another high ranking Ba'athist, Younis al-Ahmed, called for a General Conference of the Iraqi Ba'ath party in Syria to elect a new leadership (the faction's armed wing is The Return). This move caused a significant amount of controversy within the party, with al-Douri issuing a statement criticizing Syria for what al-Douri claimed was an American-supported attempt to undermine the Iraqi Ba'ath party, although this statement was later downplayed. The conference elected al-Ahmed as secretary-general, and al-Ahmed issued an order expelling al-Douri from the party, resulting in al-Douri issuing a counter order expelling al-Ahmed and 150 other party members. These events led to the existence, in effect, of two Iraqi Ba'ath Parties: the main party led by al-Douri, and a splinter party led by al-Ahmed.

al-Ahmed's Ba'ath Party is based in Syria. It is believed to contain most of the remaining leading party figures who were not arrested or executed, including Mezher Motni Awad, To'ma Di'aiyef Getan, Jabbar Haddoosh, Sajer Zubair, and Nihad alDulaimi. In contrast to al-Douri's group, al-Ahmad's faction has had success in recruiting Shi'as to the party. While al-Ahmed and the faction's senior leaders are Sunnis, there are many Shiites who are working in the organization's middle level. Upon his election as leader, an al-Ahmed's faction statement said he was "of Shia origins and coming from Shia areas in Nineveh governorate". In contrast to al-Ahmed, al-Douri had stuck to a more conservative policy, recruiting members from largely Sunni-dominated areas.

It could be said that al-Ahmed has returned to the Ba'ath Party's original ideology of secular pan-Arab nationalism which, in many cases, has proven successful in Iraq's Shi'a dominated southern provinces. However, despite his attempts, al-Ahmed has failed in his goal to overthrow al-Douri. Al-Douri's faction is the largest and the most active on the Internet, and the large majority of Ba'athist websites are aligned to al-Douri. Another failure is that al-Ahmed's faction, which is based in Syria, does not have exclusive Syrian support and, considering that it is based in Syria, the party is susceptible to Syrian interference in its affairs. However, despite the differences between the al-Douri and al-Ahmed factions, both of them adhere to Ba'athist thought.

On 2 January 2012, the Organizations of Central Euphrates and the South (OCES), believed to be headed by Hamed Manfi al-Karafi, issued a statement condemning sectarianism within the party, specifically criticizing al-Douri's faction. The OCES condemned the leadership's decision of creating a primary Sunni leadership and a reserve Shiite leadership.

This decision by the al-Douri faction leadership was a response to complaints by Ba'athist organizations in Shiite-dominated areas on what they considered policy errors which led to marginalization and exclusion of Shiite members. The OCES rejected the decision, and considered them illegitimate. In its statement, the OCES stated that "the failure to implement [its] decisions is considered a rebellion against legitimate authority [...]" and "a conscious and explicit threat, and an attempt to impose a bitter reality through decisions that are tainted by sectarian and regional motivations." In its ending remarks, the OCES statement read "any connection or link with any member of the Iraqi branch leadership locally or abroad, while continuing organizational activities according to the Organizations of Central Euphrates and the South leadership's decisions that were reached last year based on prior understandings with the national leadership". Despite breaking with al-Douri's faction, al-Karafi's faction has not aligned itself with either al-Ahmed's faction or Resurrection and Renewal Movement, a third Ba'athist group.

al-Douri had been considered more of a symbol, but he didn't actually hold that much power over the party. In a discussion with the American embassy in Amman, Jordan, in 2007, retired Lieutenant General Khalid al-Jibouri stated that he believed "a powerful shadow group of personnel [was] behind him who really constitute the operational leadership of his faction". He further noted that the party was modernizing, in the sense that it recognized it would be impossible to return to power alone, while, at the same time, it returned to its old, Ba'athist ideological roots. In another note, al-Jibouri noted that the Ba'ath Party had become a major enemy of al-Qaida in Iraq.

In the wake of Muammar Gaddafi's downfall, the new Libyan government sent documents to the Iraqi government which claimed that Ba'athists, with help from Gaddafi, were planning a coup. Because of the revelations, the Iraqi government initiated a purge of thousands of public officials. The purge triggered Sunni protests, with many calling for Sunni autonomy within Iraq. Surprisingly to outside observers, al-Douri's Ba'ath party opposed Sunni autonomy and, in a statement, referred to it as "a dangerous plan to divide Iraq along sectarian lines." However this condemnation was mostly symbolic as Al-Douri's group participated in protests where calls for Sunni Autonomy were present and allied with groups that believed in and agitated for autonomy.

In July 2012, the Ba'ath Party published a videotaped speech of al-Douri, in which he condemned the existing government and American interference in Iraq. However, in a change of tone, al-Douri stated he wished to establish good relations with the United States when the American forces had been withdrawn and when the government had been toppled. As of 2013, it was reported that al-Douri was living in the city of Mosul, having left Syria because of the ongoing civil war. Many analysts were afraid that the Ba'ath Party had the potential power to initiate another civil war in Iraq because of al-Douri's popularity in localities with Sunni majorities.

In 2016, the Iraqi parliament reiterated the 2003 ban on the Baath party. Al-Douri died in 2020.

On 12 June 2026, the Iraqi National Security Service (INSS) announced it had arrested 15 people whom they accused of planning assassinations of senior security officials. The agency said the suspects were linked to the National Gathering for Change and Liberation, an alleged Ba'ath Party front organization led by Jamal Mustafa Abdullah.

== Ideology ==
The Arab Socialist Ba'ath Party – Iraq Region was ideologically rooted in Ba'athism, a political doctrine combining Arab nationalism, Arab socialism, and pan-Arabism. A central component of Ba'athist ideology was secularism, particularly in its early and mid-period development, although this orientation was later modified. The party further incorporated elements of Arab irredentism, and maintained an explicitly republican political outlook.

Following its consolidation of power, especially after the rise of Saddam Hussein in 1979, the Iraqi branch developed a distinct ideological variant commonly referred to as Saddamism. This interpretation emphasized centralized authority and has been widely characterized as authoritarian and increasingly militarized. By the 1980s, its socialism had evolved into a form of authoritarian populism.

During the 1990s, particularly under the Faith Campaign, the party incorporated elements of Islamism. The party also maintained positions associated with anti-Zionism. Historically, it aligned with the Eastern Bloc.

==== Saddamism ====
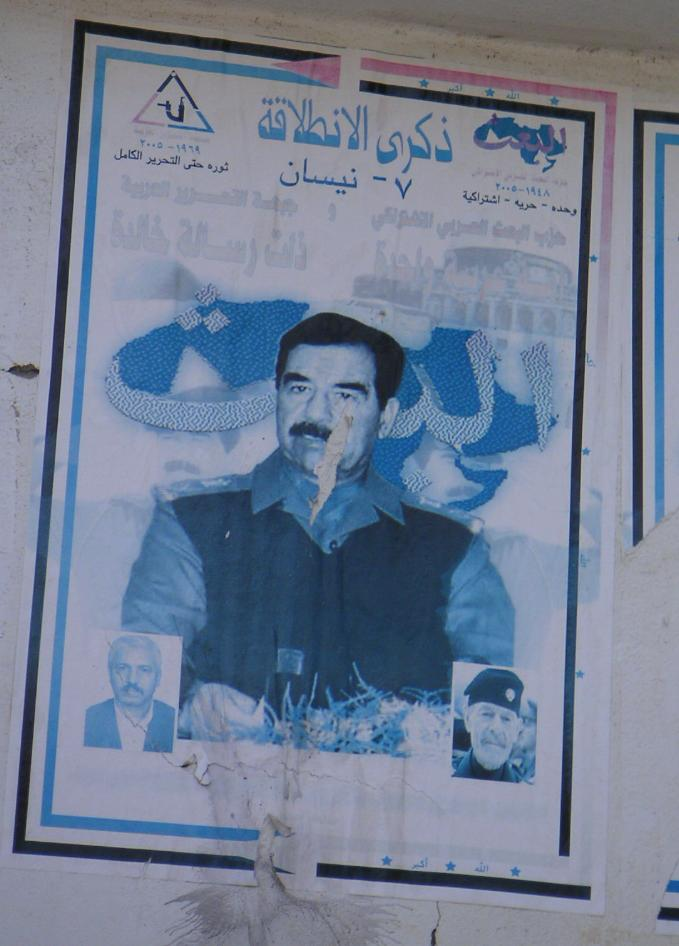
Iraqi Ba'athist poster showing Saddam Hussein in the middle of the poster, a map of a pan-Arab state, and the flags of the Ba'ath Party and Iraq during the Ba'athist era along the border of the poster.

Saddamism (Arabic: صدامية, romanized: Ṣaddāmiyah), also known as Saddamist Ba'athism (Arabic: البعثية الصدامية, romanized: al-Baʿthīyah as-Ṣaddāmiyah), is a Ba'athist political ideology based on the political ideas and thinking of Saddam Hussein, who served as the president of Iraq from 1979 to 2003. It espouses Arab nationalism, Arab socialism and Pan-Arabism, as well as an Iraq-centred Arab world that calls upon Arab countries to adopt Saddamist political discourse and reject "the Nasserist discourse" that it claims collapsed following the Six-Day War in 1967. It is militarist and views political disputes and conflict in a military manner as "battles" requiring "fighting", "mobilization", "battlefields", "bastions", and "trenches". Saddamism was officially supported by Saddam Hussein's government and the ruling Iraqi Arab Socialist Ba'ath Party and promoted by the Iraqi daily newspaper Babil owned by Saddam's son Uday Hussein.

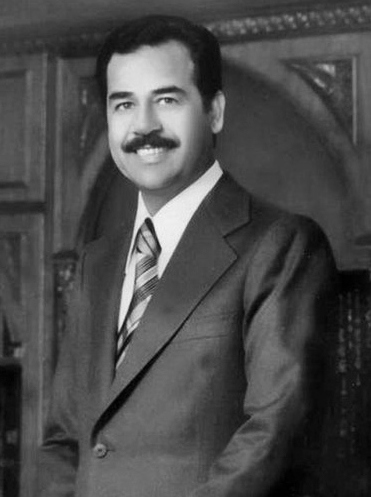
Saddam Hussein in 1980

Saddamism has often been described as an authoritarian and totalitarian ideology that aimed to control all aspects of Iraqi life, and has been accused by critics of incorporating "Sunni Arab nationalism, confused Stalinism, and fascist zeal for the fatherland and its leader", as well as enabling Saddam to generate a cult of personality revolving around him. However, the applicability of these labels has been contested. Saddamism's right-wing nature contributed to the inter-Ba'athist rivalry with the left-wing neo-Ba'athists and the Assad family who held power in Ba'athist Syria.

=== Political position ===
In terms of political positioning, the Iraqi Ba'ath Party has been described as centre to right-wing within the Ba'ath movement while also being classified more broadly as left-wing due to its ideological foundations.

== Organization and structure ==
=== Regional (central) level ===
The Regional Command (RC) (Arabic: al-qiyada al-qutriyya) was the Iraqi Regional Branch highest decision-making organ. Throughout its history, the RC has normally had 19-21 members. When in power, the Directorate of Security Affairs was responsible for the security of the president and the senior members of the Regional Command. The Regional Congress was (in theory) the de jure decision-making organ on Iraqi regional affairs when in session, but was (in practice) a tool in control of the Regional Command.

Congresses held

- 1st Regional Congress (December 1955)
- 2nd Regional Congress (late 1957)
- 3rd Regional Congress (July 1960)
- 4th Regional Congress (May 1962)
- 5th Regional Congress (13–25 September 1963)
- 6th Regional Congress (October 1966)
- 7th Regional Congress (1969)
- 8th Regional Congress (1974)
- 9th Regional Congress (June 1982)
- 10th Regional Congress (September 1991)
- 11th Regional Congress (1993)
- 12th Regional Congress (May 2001)

The Ba'ath Party had its own secretariat (Arabic: maktab amanat sir al-qutr), through which every major decision in the country was channelled. According to Joseph Sassoon, the secretariat functioned as the "party's board of directors," overseeing the running of the party branches which, in turn, controlled and collected information about civilian and military life throughout the country. The secretariat had the power to propose marriages and, in certain cases, to approve and disapprove marriages for the sake of the party. At the 8th Regional Congress, the leadership laid emphasis on building "a strong and central national authority." The party leadership's response to the party's apparent lack of centralisation came with a Revolutionary Command Council resolution which stated that "all correspondence between state ministries and party organisations are to be sent through the party secretariat."

The head of the secretariat was the deputy director, who was the second in the order of precedence. The office of director of the secretariat was the leading organ within the body. The secretariat had 11 departments: the Military and Armaments Department, Vocational Schools Department, Courses Department, Finance Department, Organisational and Political Department, Party Affairs and Information Department, Personnel and Administrative Department, Technical Department, Information and Studies Department, Legal Department and the Audit Department. The only non-department under the direct responsibility of the secretariat was the Saddam Institute for the Study of the Qur'an.

The functions and responsibilities of the secretariat were drawn up in a detailed manner. The Office of the President issued a directive to formulate its hierarchy, and the functions of the sections and departments were clearly defined. The secretariat encompassed all party branches. This system led to the bureaucratisation of the party, and decision-making was often cumbersome and inefficient. This inefficiency meant that Saddam could govern without fearing any rivals.

The Department for Organisational and Political Affairs (DOPA) was the most important department of the secretariat. It prepared material for discussion that the secretary-general (Arabic: amin sir), the party's leader, personally ordered. The DOPA also was responsible for following up on political matters in party branches. One of DOPA's sections was responsible for gathering information for candidates for important positions within the party or the government. Some departments had a similar job to the DOPA section, and were responsible for admissions to the military colleges, institutions for higher education and the Saddam Institute for the Study of the Qur'an. The party sought to control these institutions so that no single opposition party could gain a foothold in them.

=== Lower levels ===
Below the Regional Command were the bureau structures (Arabic: maktab al-tandhimat), which would gather all party activities in a single geographic area into the responsibility of a single unit. Until 1989, there were six bureau structures in the country: in Baghdad, Al-Forat, the centre, southern and northern Iraq, and one bureau for military affairs. By 2002, there were 17. Below the bureau structures was the branch (Arabic: Fir), which supervised the activities of the sections, divisions and cells (Arabic: shu'ba, firqa and khaliyya). Several of these organs were merged or split, and the number of branches had increased to 69 branches by 2002. The numbers of sections and divisions varied between provinces. As membership increased, new sections and divisions were established. In Maysan province, the number of sections increased from five in 1989 to 20 in 2002, each section in turn having 93 divisions. By September 2002, there existed 4,468 party offices in the country, and there were 32,000 cells.

=== Security functions ===
Nationally, the Ba'ath Party functioned as an institution acting as the eyes and ears of the government. During its rule, the party gained influence over the military, the government bureaucracy, labour, professional unions and, not least, the building of the cult of personality of Saddam. From the 1990s until the fall of the Ba'ath Party in 2003, it became involved in the handling of food distribution, the pursuing and apprehension of military deserters and, by the end, it was responsible for the preparations for the 2003 invasion of Iraq. Branches and sections enjoyed powers similar to those of the police in the West. Outside of Baghdad, they were "legally authorised to incarcerate suspects using Extrajudicial procedures".

One of the party's most important functions was gathering information about its opponents. In Northern Iraq, the Ba'ath gathered information about the Kurdish Democratic Party by tracking their activities among the local population. They tried to recruit members from Kurd-dominated areas through supplying food or a literacy campaign. During the drive to Arabise Kurdistan, the party resettled several hundred loyal party officials there to strengthen the party in the area. Kurds who had moved from Kurdistan would, in most instances, not be allowed back unless they were loyal Ba'ath Party members. The Military and Armament Department was responsible for coordinating the distribution of arms to party officials.

== Management ==
=== Discipline ===
The Ba'ath Party instilled party discipline in its members. According to a statement in the Revolutionary Command Council (RCC), "Party members are expected to inspire others by their exemplary behavior, sense of discipline, political consciousness, and willingness to sacrifice themselves in the interests of the Party and state." Saddam was a great believer in discipline, and believed that lack of discipline and organisation were behind any failure. In accordance with this view, the party issued a myriad of rules and regulations to combat laziness, corruption and abuses of power. Members found breaching the party code were either demoted or expelled from the party.

=== Finances ===
The Ba'ath Party was supported financially by the RCC, the highest executive and legislative body of government. Members were required to pays fees commensurate with their ranks. For instance, a supporting member would pay 25 Iraqi dinar for membership, while a branch member would pay 3,000 Iraqi dinars. Fees were important in the party's balance sheet. The central party leadership often emphasised the importance of members' financial abilities. The leadership encouraged members to contribute more to party finances. According to Jawad Hashim, a former Minister of Planning and the RCC Economic Advisor, Saddam gave the Ba'ath Party the five percent of Iraqi oil revenues, which were previously owned by the Gulbenkin Foundation. Saddam's reasoning was that, if a counter-coup took place and the Ba'ath Party was forced from power, as had been the case in November 1963, the party needed financial security so that it could reclaim power. By Hasim's estimates, the Ba'ath Party had accumulated US$10 billion in external revenues by 1989.

=== Membership ===
When the party came to power in 1968 in the 17 July Revolution, it was determined to increase party membership so that it could compete with ideological opponents such as the Iraqi Communist Party. Saddam had a clear plan, and on 25 February 1976 he said, "It should be our ambition to make all Iraqis in the country Ba'athists in membership and belief or in the latter only." This is contrary to his statements in the 1990s, when increasing membership was more important than recruiting members who adhered to Ba'athist ideology.

Like most parties, the Ba'ath membership was organised in a hierarchical manner. The head of a branch, division or section was the secretary-general, who was responsible to the secretariat. At the bottom was sympathiser, a member seeking to climb the party ranks with the status of active members, which could take five to 10 years. In certain provinces, "national activity" was the status given to the lowest level of the hierarchy. Where this level existed, it could take two to three years to climb up to the rank of sympathiser. The report to the 10th National Congress stated that "It is not sufficient for a member just to believe in the idea of the party, but what is required is total commitment and not simply a political affiliation."

=== Affiliations ===
The Iraqi branch of the Ba'ath Party maintained a number of national and regional affiliations over the course of its development, particularly in connection with coalition politics in Iraq and the broader Ba'athist movement.

National:

- National Union Front (until 1958)
- National Progressive Front (until 2003)

Regional:

- Ba'ath Party (until 1966)
- Pro-Iraqi Ba'ath Party (from 1966)
- Progressive Socialist Organizations of the Mediterranean (historical)

The National Union Front operated as an alliance of nationalist groups prior to the 1958 revolution. The National Progressive Front was established later as a coalition of legally recognized parties in Iraq. Prior to the 1966 Syrian coup d'état, the Iraqi branch formed part of the unified Ba'ath Party. Following the split, it aligned with the Iraqi-dominated faction. The party also participated in regional initiatives, including the PSOM/CSDM.

== Electoral history ==
=== Presidential elections ===
Election	Party candidate	Votes	%	Result
1995	Saddam Hussein	8,348,700	99.99%	Elected ✓
2002	Saddam Hussein	11,445,638	100%	Elected ✓

=== National Assembly elections ===
Election	Party leader	Seats	+/–
1980	Saddam Hussein	187 / 250	▲187
1984	Saddam Hussein	183 / 250	▼4
1989	Saddam Hussein	207 / 250	▲24
1996	Saddam Hussein	161 / 250	▼46
2000	Saddam Hussein	165 / 250	▲4
January 2005	Saddam Hussein	Banned	
December 2005	Saddam Hussein	Banned	
2010	Izzat Ibrahim al-Douri	Banned	
2014	Izzat Ibrahim al-Douri	Banned	
2018	Izzat Ibrahim al-Douri	Banned	
2021	Mohammed Younis al-Ahmed	Banned	

== See also ==
- Ba'ath Party archives
