= National Progressive Front (Iraq) =

Political alliance in Iraq

National Progressive Front الجبهة الوطنية التقدمية
- Secretary-General: Naim Haddad
- Founder: Ahmed Hassan al-Bakr
- Founded: 16 July 1973; 53 years ago
- Dissolved: 1 May 2003; 23 years ago
- Headquarters: Baghdad, Iraq
- Ideology: Factions: Saddamism; Ba'athism; Arab nationalism; Arab Socialism; Kurdish nationalism; Communism; Marxism-Leninism
- Political position: Big tent

The National Progressive Front (Arabic: الجبهة الوطنية التقدمية, romanized: al-Jabha al-Waṭaniyyah al-Taqaddumiyyah, NPF), sometimes known as the Progressive Patriotic and National Front was a Ba'athist Iraqi popular front announced on 16 July 1973 and constituted in 1974, ostensibly formed within the framework of a "joint action programme" to establish a coalition between the Arab Socialist Ba'ath Party, the Iraqi Communist Party, the Kurdistan Revolutionary Party, a pro-government section of the Kurdistan Democratic Party, and miscellaneous independents. The Iraqi Communist Party were removed from the NPF in 1979, while the Kurdish Democratic Party suffered restrictions when Saddam Hussein came to power after 1979. The creation of the Front ensured the leading role of the Ba'athists in state and society, whilst allowing limited autonomy for other participating parties loyal to the government. Saddam once spoke of it as "one of the essential forms to voice our will and to deepen democracy and political participation of the people and the national forces in building the new experiment in all fields." In effect, the Front was controlled and maintained solely by the Ba'ath, with all other legal political forces acting in subservience to it.

== History ==
The origins of the Front lay in July 1970 when the government under Ahmed Hassan al-Bakr, amid fighting the militant Iraqi Communist Party – Central Command and dealing with Kurdish separatist militancy, offered the formation of the Front to moderate sections of the Iraqi Communists under conditions guaranteeing Ba'athist dominance over the state and political exclusivity within the armed forces. To quell Kurdish separatist sentiment, an autonomy agreement was agreed to in 1970 to create Iraqi Kurdistan while attempts were made to get the Kurdistan Democratic Party to join the Front in the 1973-1974 period. This resulted in a majority section led by Mustafa Barzani continuing to rebel against the state. In contrast, a smaller faction led by Hashim Aqrawi and Ahmad Muhammad Saeed al-Atrushi joined the Front.

The Iraqi Communists, despite entry into the Front, continued to experience repression such as the arrest of factory members, execution of members within the armed forces, and strong censorship of the ICP's daily newspaper. By 1979, the leadership of the ICP was either arrested or in exile, with the party formally withdrawing from the Front by 1980 to openly oppose the government. In the 1995-2000 period, a small pro-government Iraqi Communist Party led by Yusuf Hamdan was proclaimed, and its existence was tolerated. However, it was not a formal member of the Front.

Upon the formation of Iraq's National Assembly in 1980, the Front was tasked with nominating candidates to stand in elections. Throughout its existence the Secretary General of the Front was Naim Haddad. It was disbanded in 2003 following the overthrow of the Ba'athist Government in the Iraq War.

== Constituent parties ==
Party	Ideology
Arab Socialist Ba'ath Party	Saddamism Ba'athism
Iraqi Communist Party (Note: Left the front in 1980 and joined the opposition)	Communism
Kurdistan Revolutionary Party	Kurdish nationalism

== Electoral history ==
=== National Assembly elections ===
Election	Seats	+/–	Position	Government
1980	187 / 250	▲187	▲1st	Sole legal coalition
1984	183 / 250	▼4	1st	Sole legal coalition
1989	207 / 250	▲24	1st	Sole legal coalition
1996	161 / 250	▼46	1st	Sole legal coalition
2000	165 / 250	▲4	1st	Sole legal coalition

== See also ==
- National Progressive Front (Syria)
