= Mustafa Setmariam Nasar =

Suspected Syrian member of Al-Qaeda

Personal life
- Born: 26 October 1958 Aleppo, Syria
- Died: 2011 (aged 52–53) Sednaya Prison, Saidnaya, Syria
- Other names: Kunya: Abu Musab al-Suri; Umar Abd al-Hakim
- Occupation: Writer

Religious life
- Religion: Islam
- Denomination: Sunni
- Movement: Salafi
- Children: 4

Mustafa bin Abd al-Qadir Setmariam Nasar (Arabic: مصطفى بن عبد القادر ست مريم نصار, romanized: Muṣṭafá ibn ʻAbd al-Qādir sitt Maryam Naṣṣār; 26 October 1958 – 2011) commonly known by his nom de guerre Abu Musab al-Suri (Arabic: أبو مصعب السوري, romanized: Abū Muṣ'ab as-Sūrī), was a suspected Al-Qaeda member and writer best known for his 1,600-page book The Global Islamic Resistance Call. He was considered by many as "the most articulate exponent of the modern jihad and its most sophisticated strategist".

Nasar held Spanish citizenship since the late 1980s, following marriage to a Spanish woman. He was wanted in Spain for the 1985 El Descanso bombing, which killed eighteen people in a restaurant in Madrid, and (as a witness) in connection with the 2004 Madrid train bombings.

Nasar was captured by Pakistani security forces in 2005 and was rendered to Syria, where he was also a wanted man. The Spanish political scientist Fernando Reinares believes that he was likely executed at the beginning of the Syrian uprisings of 2011.

== Life ==
Nasar's full name is Mustafa bin Abd al-Qadir al-Rifa'i (Arabic: مصطفى بن عبد القادر الرفاعي); he is a descendant of Ahmed al-Rifa'i, who is the founder of the Rifa'i Sufi order, and his paternal great grandmother was Set Mariam (Arabic: ست مريم, meaning Lady Mariam). His mother is the daughter of Mohammed Nasar, an Egyptian who came to Syria with Ibrahim Pasha's campaigns against the Ottoman Empire.

Nasar was born and grew up in Aleppo in Syria, and attended four years of university studies there at the University of Aleppo's Department of Mechanical Engineering. In 1980, he joined the Fighting Vanguard, a radical militant offshoot of the Syrian Muslim Brotherhood, which was at the forefront of the Islamist uprising in Syria against Hafez al-Assad's government. Nasar was forced to flee Syria at the end of 1980. He then joined the Syrian Muslim Brotherhood in exile, receiving training at their bases and safe houses in Iraq and Jordan. He is reported to have participated in the Islamist uprising of Hama in 1982, which led to the 1982 Hama massacre. He emigrated to France and later to Spain in the mid-1980s.

In 1987, Nasar and a small group of Syrian friends left Spain for Peshawar, where they met Abdullah Azzam, the godfather of the Arab-Afghan movement. Nasar was enlisted as a military trainer at the camps for Arab volunteer fighters, and he also fought on the frontlines against the Soviet Union in Afghanistan and the communist government in Kabul after the Soviet withdrawal in 1988.

Nasar met Osama bin Laden in Peshawar and claims to have been a member of his inner circle and working for bin Laden until sometime around 1992, when Nasar returned to Spain. In Peshawar, Nasar became known under his pen name Umar Abd al-Hakim after he published a 900-page treatise in May 1991, entitled Lessons Learned from the Jihad Ordeal in Syria, also known as The Syrian Experience. The treatise examines the jihad waged against the Syrian regime of Hafez al-Assad from 1976 to 1982 and its subsequent failure.

From 1985 to 1995, Nasar adopted Spain as his primary place of residence, even though he traveled extensively and spent much time in Afghanistan. In Spain, he married Elena Moreno in 1987/88, who converted to Islam. This marriage allowed him to become a Spanish citizen. They have four children.

Among his associates was Imad Eddin Yarkas alias Abu Dahdah, head of al-Qaeda's Madrid cell, who was arrested in November 2001 on suspicion of membership in al-Qaida and of involvement in the 11 September 2001 attacks. He was later acquitted of charges of assisting the 9/11 plotters, but convicted of membership in a terrorist organization.

Nasar first moved to London in 1994, and brought his family along in mid-1995. It is possible that he fled Spain because of suspicions he was involved in the 1995 Islamist terror bombings in France. For a while, Nasar edited al-Ansar, the most important jihadi magazine at the time, with ties to the Algerian Armed Islamic Group (GIA). Nasar left the journal in 1996, partly due to disagreements with the new GIA leadership in Algeria and partly as a result of a conflict with its chief editor, Umar Mahmud Uthman Abu Umar, better known as Abu Qatada al-Filistini. The latter is widely regarded as al-Qaeda's principal cleric in Europe.

In 1997, Nasar established a media company called Islamic Conflict Studies Bureau with Mohamed Bahaiah. Through this office, he facilitated two important media events for bin Laden in Afghanistan, in particular Peter Bergen's famous CNN interview with bin Laden in March 1997. In fact, he served in the days before 9/11 as the facilitator who took Western reporters to meet with Osama bin Laden in Afghanistan.

Towards the end of 1997, Nasar left London for Afghanistan, operating initially as a lecturer and trainer in the Arab-Afghan camps and guesthouses. He settled there with his family in 1998. In 1999, he formed a media and research center in Kabul and in 2000, he was allowed to open his own training camp, the al-Ghuraba Camp, located in Kargha, near Kabul. Nasar's camp was formally part of the Taliban's Ministry of Defense, and separate from al-Qaeda and bin Laden's organization, whom he had fallen out with in 1998. In a seven-page letter from mid-1998, Nasar launched scathing criticism of bin Laden for the disdain al-Qaeda had shown towards the Taliban leadership of Afghanistan, including Mullah Omar. He is also highly critical of their strategies, and has denounced al-Qaeda's 1998 attacks on the US embassies in East Africa and the 11 September attack on New York's Twin Towers, which he argues put a catastrophic end to the jihadist cause.

On 19 January 2009, FBI interrogator Robert Fuller testified during a hearing before Canadian Omar Khadr's Guantanamo military commission that during interrogations in October 2002, Khadr confessed to staying at a Kabul guest house run by "Abu Musab al-Suri".

In September 2003, Spanish magistrate Baltasar Garzon indicted 35 members of the Madrid cell for their role in the 11 September attacks, including Nasar. In November 2004, the United States Department of State named Nasar a Most Wanted Terrorist and offered a reward of US$5 million for information about his location.

== Reports of detention and execution ==
Nasar was reportedly captured in the Pakistani city of Quetta in late October 2005, although exactly where and when is disputed. He was taken into American custody a month or so after his capture; however, he was not among the 14 high-profile al-Qaeda suspects transferred to the Guantanamo Bay detention camp in late 2006, and there were persistent reports that he was one of the ghost prisoners held in secret detention at the U.S. Navy's Naval Support Facility (NSF) on Diego Garcia.

On 14 April 2009, Garzón sent out queries as to Nasar's location. Daniel Woolls, writing for the Associated Press, reported that Garzon queried Britain, the US, Pakistan, Syria, and Afghanistan. The report stated US officials confirmed that Nasar was apprehended in Quetta, Pakistan, in November 2005. The Spanish newspaper El País attributed Garzon's query to United States President Barack Obama's announcement that the Guantanamo detention camp and the CIA's black sites would be closed.

It appears that at some stage, Nasar was rendered to Syria, where he was a wanted man. In late 2011, rumours emerged that Nasar had been released from a Syrian jail. This was repeated in early 2012 by a posting on an al-Qaeda-linked web forum.

However, in March 2014, al-Qaeda spokesman Adam Gadahn revealed that Nasar was still believed to be in prison. In April 2014, al-Qaeda leader Ayman al-Zawahiri also confirmed that Nasar was still believed to be in prison.

The Spanish newspaper 20 minutos published an article about his death by execution in a Syrian prison in 2011.

== Works and influence ==
Due to his prolific writings on strategic and political issues, and his guerrilla warfare experience, Nasar was a popular lecturer and to a certain degree an unofficial adviser for a wide range of jihadist groups in Afghanistan. Organizationally, however, he has remained a rather independent figure. While some reports have linked him to Abu Musab al-Zarqawi, who later led al-Qaeda's component of the insurgency in Iraq, his network of contacts was much wider, and included jihadists from Morocco, Algeria, Libya, Egypt, Syria, Lebanon, Iraqi Kurdistan, Saudi Arabia, Yemen, Uzbekistan, and elsewhere. Media reports have also alleged that one of his associates, the Syrian Imad Eddin Barakat Yarkas (Abu Dahdah), had met 11 September organizers Mohamed Atta and Ramzi bin al-Shibh in Tarragona, Spain, weeks before the attacks, but this seems to be incorrect.

He once stated that:

There will be no salvation for the umma, unless we follow the principle of hanging the last unbeliever of the last [Christian] priest by the intestines. The only weapon we have with which to face the modern machinery of the enemy is jihad and the love of death. The spirit is enriched by the love of death [...] Mutilated bodies, skeletons, terrorism [...] words so beautiful!

Nasar had conflict with bin Laden, and a 2001 email was intercepted in which he wrote that, "We are in a ship that you are burning on false and mistaken grounds", accusing bin Laden of having "caught the disease of screens, flashes, fans and applause".

Nasar was reported to be the mastermind of the 2004 Madrid train bombings as well as the 7/7 London bombings. In a statement released after the attacks, al-Suri said: "[In my teachings] I have mentioned vital and legitimate targets to be hit in the enemy's countries ... Among those targets that I specifically mentioned as examples was the London Underground. [Targeting this] was and still is the aim."

Nasar's best known work is the 1,600-page book The Global Islamic Resistance Call (Da'wat al-muqawamah al-islamiyyah al-'alamiyyah), which appeared on the Internet in December 2004 or January 2005. In an article in the September 2006 edition of The New Yorker magazine, author Lawrence Wright wrote that in this book, Nasar:

proposes that the next stage of jihad will be characterized by terrorism created by individuals or small autonomous groups (what he terms 'leaderless resistance') which will wear down the enemy and prepare the ground for the far more ambitious aim of waging war on 'open fronts' ... 'without confrontation in the field and seizing control of the land, we cannot establish a state, which is the strategic goal of the resistance.

The American occupation of Iraq, he declares, inaugurated a 'historical new period' that almost single-handedly rescued the jihadist movement just when many of its critics thought it was finished.

According to Boaz Ganor, in this book, Nasar posited that there's an inevitable clash between capitalist economics, secular philosophy, and democracy within Muslim culture. Despite this, he acknowledged that Islamists may exploit democracy to achieve their objectives, emphasizing the role of missionary activities conducted by jihadist organizations, leveraging democratic institutions to sway Muslim sentiments.

French political scientist Gilles Kepel says that "he is part of the second generation of the jihadist movement, the ones who were concerned with the failure of mobilization after 9/11." Nasar felt that the failure of the 9/11 attacks to rouse global Muslim outrage was compounded by the failure of the jihadist terror campaign in Iraq, and by the subsequent Western success in reducing what was once a global movement into increasingly isolated archipelagos of local movements and causes, says Kepel.

Brynjar Lia of the Norwegian Defense Research Establishment portrays him as the most brilliant and dangerous ideologue of his cohort of radicals, "a dissident, a critic and an intellectual", who puts "hard-nosed realism before religious wish-fulfillment and pragmatic long-term strategies before utopianism."

Scholars Brian A. Jackson and Bryce Loidolt argue that Mohammad Hasan Khalil al-Hakim's Management of Savagery and al-Suri's Call to Global Islamic Resistance led al-Qaeda to innovate and shift practices.

In early 2014, a top Sharia official in the Syrian jihadist group Al-Nusra Front, Dr. Sami al-Oraydi, acknowledged that his group is influenced by the teachings of Abu Musab Al Suri. The strategies derived from Abu Musab's guidelines to win hearts and minds amongst local Muslim communities include: providing services to people, avoiding being seen as extremists, maintaining strong relationships with communities and other fighting groups, and putting the focus on fighting the government.

Abu Musab al-Zarqawi, Mustafa Setmariam Nasar (Abu Musab al-Suri), Abdullah Azzam, Ayman al-Zawahiri, and Osama bin Laden were cited by Abu Khalid al-Suri when he addressed ISIL.

Mustafa Setmariam Nasar wrote in support of the East Turkestan Independence Movement and praised the conquest of Kashgar by Qutayba ibn Muslim and Yaqub Beg, praising the latter's buildings of educational institutions for Islam and mosques and calling him "Attalik Ghazi" and a "good man" for his war against Buddhists and Chinese people. Mustafa Setmariam Nasar had met some Uyghurs in Afghanistan, where they trained as mujahidin. He criticized China for restrictions on religion and Islamic teaching imposed on Uyghurs. The Turkistan Islamic Party's 18th issue of the magazine Islamic Turkistan published an article on Mustafa Setmariam Nasar's career. The 19th issue of this magazine contained an article by Abi Khadeejah al-Shami on Nasar.

=== Publication of articles in Inspire ===
In June 2010, Al Qaeda in the Arabian Peninsula was reported to have published Inspire magazine – its first English-language publication, sprung from the imagination of Anwar al-Awlaki. It contained an article published under the name Abu Mu'sab al-Suri. This article was the beginning of a series entitled "The Jihadi experiences". Further articles in this series appeared in the next 5 issues of Inspire. They were excerpts copied from a translation of The Global Islamic Resistance Call which appeared in a biography of Abu Musab al-Suri.

=== Eschatology ===
French Islamic eschatology scholar Jean-Pierre Filiu notes that another departure Nasar makes from the ideology of Al-Qaeda is his interest in eschatology—including the coming of the Mahdi, the Antichrist, the mountain of gold to be found in the Euphrates river, the Sufyani, Gog and Magog, and the proper chronology and location of related battles and other activities. The last 100 pages of The Global Islamic Resistance Call are devoted to end times in Islam. "I have no doubt that we have entered into the age of battles and tribulations [zāman al-malāhim wal-fitan]"... The earth is filled with oppression and injustice and events led on from one another toward the appearance of the Mahdi. ...The twentieth century is past, and we have now entered the twenty-first to find that most people seem prepared to follow the Antichrist".

His interest extended to the "central role" that the hadith about end times outlined for his homeland of as-Shām (modern-day Syria, Lebanon, Jordan, and Palestine) and the need for Al-Qaeda to reorient its strategy to "take into account this final clash" with the enemies of Islam. Filiu speculates that Nasar's interest may have been related to the popularity of eschatology among the Muslim masses, and Nasar's "increasingly frantic attempt" following the post-11 September crackdown on jihadists, "to formulate a message that would appeal to the greatest possible number of Muslim believers".

== See also ==
- Marwan Hadid
- 'Adnan 'Uqla
- Abu Firas al-Suri
- Abu Khalid al-Suri
- Sami al-Oraydi
