= Adnan Saad al-Din =

Syrian Muslim Brotherhood member (1929–2010)

- عدنان سعد الدين

Supreme Guide of the Syrian Muslim Brotherhood
- In office 1976–1981

Personal life
- Born: 1929
- Died: August 1, 2010 (aged 80–81) Abdoun neighborhood, Amman, Jordan
- Resting place: Sahab Islamic Cemetery
- Partner: Aisha al-Din
- Political party: Muslim Brotherhood (1955 – Mid 1980s); Muslim Brotherhood in Syria (1976–1981); National Alliance for the Liberation of Syria (March 1982 – Mid 1980s)
- Education: Cairo University

Religious life
- Religion: Islam
- Denomination: Sunni

Muslim leader
- Predecessor: Abd al-Fattah Abu Ghudda
- Successor: Hassan Howeidi

Adnan Saad al-Din (1929–2010) was the fourth supreme guide of the Muslim Brotherhood in Syria between 1976 and 1981.

== Biography ==
Adnan was born into a family of vegetable merchants and studied in a school that combined the official certificates of the Syrian Republic and Islamic sciences. He also studied Arabic literature at King Fuad University in Cairo and graduated from it in 1955. During this time, he came into contact with Mustafa al-Sibai, leader of the Muslim Brotherhood, which led him into joining the organisation. In 1960, some disputes occurred between him and the members of the group, which led to his dismissal from the Muslim Brotherhood for about 17 years.

=== Supreme Guide of the Muslim Brotherhood ===
According to Abdullah Al-Tantawi, under the leadership of Adnan Saad al-Din, the Muslim Brotherhood of Syria took the initiative to form a committee to set the statute and internal system for the group, to rely on it in its progress, and another to make a plan for the group, according to the progress it had. According to Abdullah, Adnan has hated improvisation at work and planning was the best approach for him and for the group he has assumed responsibility since 1975. With the goal of uniting all Islamist groups under one flag, he took the initiative to build good relations between the Muslim Brotherhood and a number of scholars, which ended with the formation of the Islamic Front in Syria.

Adnan put forward the idea of uniting the four Muslim Brotherhood organizations in Syria, Lebanon, Jordan and Palestine into one organization, under the name of the Brotherhood Organization in the Levant. This idea was welcomed by the leaders of these organizations and he called for a conference to be held in one of the European countries to implement this pioneering idea. But one of these organizations retracted what was agreed upon, and faltered their achievement. Adnan also called for the gathering of Brotherhood movements in the Arab countries into regional blocs, such as the Nile Valley organization, which would merge the Egyptian Brotherhood and the Sudanese Brotherhood, and the Brotherhood in Morocco, Libya, Tunisia, Algeria and Mauritania. Another one would be the Levant Organization, which would merge the Brotherhood in Syria, Lebanon, Palestine, and Jordan.

Adnan also established relations with a number of parties in the countries of the Arab world and the Islamic world. For this reason, he toured many American cities, Muslim and Arabic countries and additionally European countries to strengthen the relations of the local Brotherhood organisations and to improve relations with political parties, politicians and influential figures. Prior to Adnan assumed the role of the Supreme Guide of the Muslim Brotherhood, his predecessor was Abd al-Fattah Abu Ghuddah, who was critical of the 1966 Syrian coup d'état which brought Salah Jadid to the Presidency. Abu Ghuddah used his position to rally scholars, whom he encouraged to boycott the state and voice opposition to Jadid's violent policies. As a result of Ghuddah's activities in the opposition he was arrested and imprisoned in the remote Tadmor Prison, where he was kept for 11 months, before being released along with all other political prisoners in 1967 as part of an amnesty following the Six-Day War with Israel. After Abu Ghuddah left Syria and went into exile in Saudi Arabia, Adnan became the new Supreme Guide of the Muslim Brotherhood in Syria.

Although Assad and Abu Ghuddah had good relations with each other, Adnan's Muslim Brotherhood was extremely against the minority Alawite Assad's assumption of power in majority Sunni Syria. Assad's new constitution, unlike previous ones, did not require that the president of Syria must be a Muslim causing fierce demonstrations in Hama, Homs and Aleppo organized by the Muslim Brotherhood and the ulama. They labelled Assad as the "enemy of Allah" and called for a jihad against his rule. Additionally, a decrease in Gulf countries' economic support, the cost of Syria's military campaign in Lebanon, and the take-in of several refugees from the conflict all further exacerbated Syria's economic livelihood. All of this combined into popular discontent.

All of this contributed to Muslim Brotherhood committing various protests and strikes, but what caused the start of the violent protests was Syrian intervention against Palestinian Liberation Organization in Lebanon, which the entire Muslim population of the world condemned. The assassination and bombing attacks were largely aimed at prominent government officials, including doctors and teachers. Most of the victims were Alawis, "which suggested that the assassins had targeted the community" but "no one could be sure who was behind" the killings. The Muslim Brotherhood was considered to be behind the violence.

It was found that the Iraqi government of Saddam Hussein had supported the insurgents with a steady flow of arms and supplies.

On 16 June 1979, the Muslim Brotherhood carried out an attack on cadets at the Aleppo Artillery School, officially killing 83. Around this time, professor Yusef al-Yusef was assassinated in Aleppo. The Syrian government responded by sentencing to death about 15 prisoners, already accused of being Iraqi agents, for belonging to the Islamic resistance movement. Terrorist attacks then became a daily occurrence, particularly in Aleppo and other northern cities. The government tended to ascribe these attacks to the Brotherhood, but as the armed resistance gained widespread popular support and more loosely defined armed groups appeared, especially in poor neighborhoods, it became difficult to determine the extent of the Brotherhood's involvement.

=== Hama Massacre ===
After the failed assassination attempt against Haffez al-Assad, Syrian government's actions against the Muslim Brotherhood insurgents has escalated immensely with massacres being committed in retaliation to the assassination attempt. Eventually this would lead into the Islamist uprising in Hama, which the government forces would react with a massive force from Lebanon and neighbouring cities to surpass it. After the Hama uprising, the Islamist insurrection was broken, and the Brotherhood has since operated in exile while other factions surrendered or slipped into hiding. Government attitudes in Syria hardened considerably during the uprising, and Assad would rely more on repression than on political tactics for the remainder of his rule, although an economic liberalization began in the 1990s.

=== National Alliance for the Liberation of Syria ===
After the downfall of the Muslim Brotherhood in Syria, many of the opposition groups in Syria would unite to form the National Alliance for the Liberation of Syria. This alliance would include a wide range of ideologies from communists to Iraqi branch of Ba'ath Party sympathisants to Adnan's Muslim Brotherhood remnants. The coalition was also reportedly obtaining support from Jordan. For the Islamists, on the other hand, joining forces with secular groups had become a necessity after the defeat in Hama in the same year. The charter of the National Alliance had only one passage referring to the Islamic heritage of Syria. This pragmatism caused dissent both within the Muslim Brotherhood ranks (their military wing commander `Adnan `Uqla saw it as treason) as well as from Islamist forces abroad. A group of ulema led by Thahir Khayrallah broke away from the Muslim Brotherhood in protest against the National Alliance.

However, in spite of its political breadth, it was unable to mobilize any popular revolt against the incumbent regime in Damascus. Instead, the activities of the coalition were largely limited to defamation against the Damascus government. Notably the foundation of the National Alliance came after the Hama revolt, by the time the possibility for mobilizing opposition activities inside Syria was too late. By the mid-1980s the platform was defunct.

=== Later Activities ===
After the Hama Massacre and the downfall of the National Alliance for the Liberation of Syria, Adnan would leave Muslim Brotherhood and be succeeded by Hassan Howeidi. He died out of natural causes at the first day of August in 2010.

== Works ==
- The Muslim Brotherhood in Syria: Before and After
- From Shishikli to the Separation
- Ba'athist (Alawite) Rule
- The Political Relations of the Brotherhood in the 80s
- The Years of Horrific Massacres from 1944 to 1983
