= Fighting Vanguard =

Syrian militant organization (1964–1982)

Fighting Vanguard of the Mujahidin
- الطليعة المقاتلة للمجاهدين
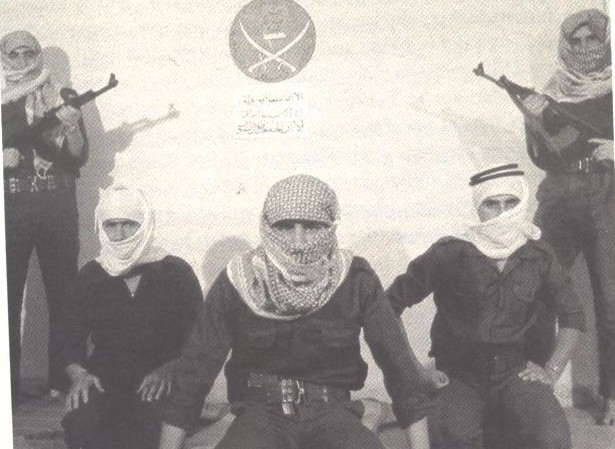
- Militants part of the "Fighting Vanguard" in Syria, 1979
- Other name: Kata'ib Muhammad/Battalions of Muhammad
- Leaders: Marwan Hadid (until June 1975); Abdel Sattar al-Za’im (until mid-1979); Adnan Uqlah (June 1979 – late 1982)
- Founded: 1964
- Dissolved: 1982
- Split from: Muslim Brotherhood in Syria
- Country: Syria
- Ideology: Sunni Islamism; Anti-Assadism; Syrian nationalism Anti-Ba'athism
- Wars: 1964 Hama riot Islamist uprising in Syria

The Fighting Vanguard of the Mujahidin (Arabic: الطليعة المقاتلة للمجاهدين, romanized: al-Ṭalīʿah al-Muqātilah lil-Mujāhidīn), also known as the Fighting Vanguard of the Muslim Brotherhood in Syria (Arabic: الطليعة المقاتلة للإخوان المسلمين في سوريا), was a Syrian militant organization and offshoot of the Syrian Muslim Brotherhood that took part in violent actions against the regime of Hafez al-Assad during the Islamist uprising in Syria, mainly between 1979 and 1982.

== History ==
Marwan Hadid, who came from a wealthy Sunni Muslim family from Hama, Syria, studied in Egypt and became influenced by the hardline cleric Sayyid Qutb. His calls for jihad against the ruling Baath Party in Syria were rejected by the leadership of the Muslim Brotherhood in Syria, dominated by moderates and afraid of the consequences of a violent confrontation with the regime, although some Brotherhood members such as Adnan Saad al-Din and Saʽid Ḥawwa tacitly supported him. Hadid came to prominence for his role in the 1964 Hama riot. He and his followers obtained training from Palestinian militants encamped in Lebanon and especially Jordan. After the Black September events in 1970, they returned to Syria determined to put into practice what they had learned against Baath leaders.

Hadid and his followers gained influence with the Brotherhood after the Syrian Constitution of 1973, which was deemed too secular by Islamists. He was able to recruit more followers and organize them into cells to carry out assassinations of representatives of the regime. The ultimate goal was to entice the government into a crackdown severe enough to draw the Brotherhood's leadership into supporting armed struggle. Hadid went into hiding in Damascus but the Baath security apparatus prioritized hunting him down and he was arrested in June 1975 and died in prison the next year. He was rumored to have been tortured and poisoned, and his death caused outrage not only from his followers but some in the Brotherhood. The Fighting Vanguard was most successful from 1976 to 1980.

== Relationship with the Muslim Brotherhood ==
The Syrian government condemned the Muslim Brotherhood for all Fighting Vanguard attacks, and the organization's violent campaign provided the pretext it had been seeking for the destruction of the Muslim Brotherhood. While the Muslim Brotherhood condemned some Fighting Vanguard attacks and had a policy of expelling its members if they joined the Fighting Vanguard, in practice in some cities—especially Hama—the local Muslim Brotherhood maintained close links with the Fighting Vanguard. As the Fighting Vanguard's assassination campaign continued in the late 1970s, a crackdown on the Muslim Brotherhood left thousands of its members and their families arrested and tortured and most of the leadership in exile. With the moderate leadership out of the picture, the Fighting Vanguard grew in strength and numbers.

In the late 1970s, the Muslim Brotherhood was negotiating with the Baath government to release its members from jail and obtain a place in the government for a cessation of attacks, even though its control over the Fighting Vanguard's activities was limited. In the aftermath of the 1979 Aleppo Artillery School massacre, the Muslim Brotherhood in Syria faced a crackdown and formally declared war on the Baath regime. However, its involvement in violent attacks after this date was limited and its talks with the Baathist government likely continued. In 1980, the Syrian Islamic Front (SIF), "an umbrella group consisting of the Brotherhood, the Fighting Vanguard and the Brotherhood’s former Damascus wing" was formed by exiled leaders as an attempt to contain the Fighting Vanguard, but it fell apart in 1981 when Adnan Uqlah, the leader of the Vanguard, found out that the Brotherhood was negotiating to bring secular Baath opponents on board. Unlike the Muslim Brotherhood, the Fighting Vanguard rejected democracy and political pluralism.

== Operations ==
The members of the Vanguard were screened and well trained. Besides specific training, most had prior military experience as conscripts or volunteers in the Syrian military. According to Patrick Seale, the organization had access to information via a highly placed mole in the Air Force Intelligence Directorate. They did not take responsibility or publicize the attacks, which were initially blamed on Syria's rival, Iraq. The organization operated in cells to reduce the risk of discovery but this strategy also led to tensions between different wings of the organization. By 1979 there were strategic disputes between fighters from Hama and Aleppo, who wanted to increase attacks on the regime, and those from Damascus who wanted to avoid doing more harm than good. Uqlah, who effectively led the Vanguard from the Aleppo massacre until his arrest in late 1982, brought on many more; including younger recruits. The financial resources, weapons, and training capacity did not keep pace with the membership growth.

Although the Fighting Vanguard targeted prominent representatives of the Ba'ath Party of Alawite, Sunni, and Christian faith, its first leader Marwan Hadid particularly hated Alawites—whom he blamed for the regime—and most targets of the organization were Alawite. Adnan Uqlah ordered a sectarian massacre of mostly Alawite military cadets in 1979 without the permission of the Fighting Vanguard's formal leader, Hisham Jumbaz, or its field commando in Aleppo. Besides those listed here, various "prominent security officers, Ba’athist politicians, university professors affiliated with the ruling party, high-ranking civil servants" were also assassinated by the Fighting Vanguard. According to one estimate, 300 Ba'ath supporters were assassinated in Aleppo alone by Muslim Brotherhood sympathizers. Attacks committed by the Fighting Vanguard include:

- Assassination of Muhammad Gharrah, leader of the Hama branch of General Intelligence Directorate (Syria) and cousin of Hafez al-Assad (early 1976)
- Bombing of the headquarters of the Ba’ath Party and its satellite parties, the National Progressive Front (1977)
- Bombing of the People's Assembly (1977)
- Assassination of the rector of the University of Damascus (1977)
- Assassination of Muhammad al-Fadel, a senior member of Ba'ath
- Assassination of Ibrahim al-Nasiri, nephew of Hafez al-Assad and chairman of the Syrian-Soviet Friendship Association (1978)
- Assassination of Ahmad Khalil, the Ministry of Interior's Director of Police Affairs (1978)
- Assassination of Adil Mini, public prosecutor of the Supreme State Security Court (1979)
- Aleppo Artillery School massacre (1979)
- Assassination of Muhammad Shahada Khalil, Hafez al-Assad's personal physician

== Demise and aftermath ==
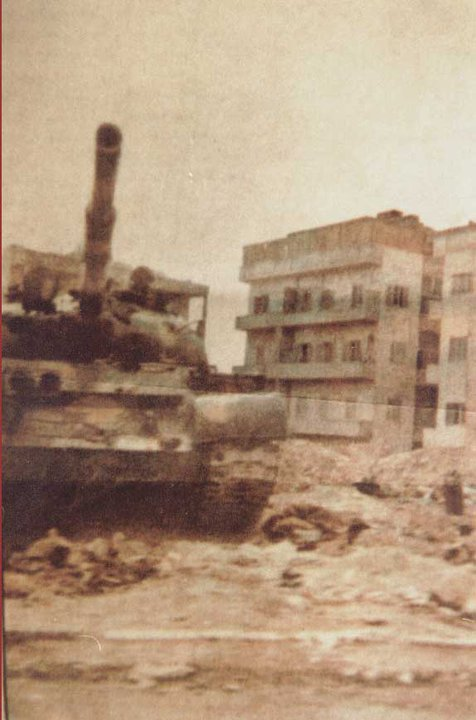
Tank of the government forces after brutal crackdown of the Muslim Brotherhood and Fighting Vanguard in Hama, February 1982. This led to the complete collapse of the Islamist opposition in Syria in the 20th century.

Large scale fighting between the Muslim Brotherhood, Fighting Vanguard and the regime in the early 1980s resulted in major losses for the former. In February 1982, an uprising broke out in Hama, led by militants joined by many civilians, which was brutally crushed by the regime with tens of thousands dead. The Muslim Brotherhood in Syria never recovered. The Fighting Vanguard collapsed after Uqlah's capture in late 1982. After the end of its campaign in Syria, some former members of the Fighting Vanguard joined the Afghan Arabs and played a role in the formation of Al-Qaeda. Abu Mus’ab al-Suri was a member of the group and later became a leading Al-Qaeda ideologue. Others were involved in the Syrian civil war, including Abu Khalid al-Suri and Abul-Abbas a-Shami, founding members of Ahrar al-Sham, and Abu Firas al-Suri, a spokesperson for Al Qaeda affiliate Jabhat al-Nusra.

== Sources ==
- Conduit, Dara (2019). The Muslim Brotherhood in Syria. Cambridge University Press. ISBN 978-1-108-49977-4.
- Lefèvre, Raphaël (2013). Ashes of Hama: The Muslim Brotherhood in Syria. Oxford University Press. ISBN 978-0-19-933062-1.
- Lefèvre, Raphaël (2015). "The Syrian Muslim Brotherhood's Alawi Conundru". The Alawis of Syria: War, Faith and Politics in the Levant. Oxford University Press. ISBN 978-0-19-045811-9.
