= National Alliance for the Liberation of Syria =

Iraqi-backed Syrian opposition coalition

National Alliance for the Liberation of Syria : التحالف الوطني لتحرير سورية
- Abbreviation: NALS
- Formation: March 1982
- Headquarters: Paris
- Region served: Syria

The National Alliance for the Liberation of Syria (Arabic: التحالف الوطني لتحرير سورية, al-Taḥālluf al-waṭanī li-taḥrīr Sūriya) was a coalition of Syrian opposition groups, supported by the Iraqi government. The foundation of the National Alliance took place in Paris in March 1982. The charter of the National Alliance was transmitted by Voice of Arab Syria on March 22, 1982. The National Alliance called for armed popular struggle in order to topple the al-Assad regime.

The coalition gathered Islamist and Arab nationalist factions, consisting of the Syrian wing of the Baghdad-based Arab Socialist Baath Party, the Muslim Brotherhood of Adnan Saad al-Din, the Communist Party - Political Bureau of Riad al-Turk, the Arab Socialists of Akram al-Hawrani and the Arab Socialist Union of Jassem Alwan and Mohammed al-Jarah, as well independent personalities Nasim al-Safarjalani, Khaled Al-Hakim and Hamoud Choufi.

For the Iraqi government, the decision of the Syrian government to block Iraqi oil exports to the Mediterranean (in the context of Syria siding with Iran in the Iran–Iraq War) prompted it to support the launching of the National Alliance. The coalition was also reportedly obtaining support from Jordan. For the Islamists, on the other hand, joining forces with secular groups had become a necessity after the defeat in Hama in the same year. The charter of the National Alliance had only one passage referring to the Islamic heritage of Syria. This pragmatism caused dissent both within the Muslim Brotherhood ranks (their military wing commander `Adnan `Uqla saw it as treason and hypocrisy) as well as from Islamist forces abroad. A group of ulema led by Thahir Khayrallah broke away from the Muslim Brotherhood in protest against the National Alliance.

However, in spite of its political breadth, it was unable to mobilize any popular revolt against the incumbent regime in Damascus. Instead, the activities of the coalition were largely limited to defamation against the Damascus government. Pro-Iraqi Syrian Baathist leaders Shibli al-Aysami and Amin al-Hafiz, representing the National Alliance, gave press interviews in which they accused Hafez al-Assad of being responsible for the loss of the Golan Heights in the Six-Day War in 1967, the atrocities in Hama and for pursuing a moderate line towards Israel and the United States. Notably the foundation of the National Alliance came after the Hama revolt, by the time the possibility for mobilizing opposition activities inside Syria was too late. By the mid-1980s the platform was defunct.
