= Abu Firas al-Suri =

Syrian Islamist militant (1950–2016)

- أبو فراس السوري
- Born: 1950; Madaya, Second Syrian Republic
- Died: April 3, 2016 (aged 65–66); Idlib Governorate, Syria
- Military career
- Allegiance: Syria (Until 1979); Fighting Vanguard (1979–1980); Al-Qaeda (1980s–2016)
- Branch: Syrian Army (Until 1979) al-Nusra Front (2012–2016)
- Service years: 1970s–2016
- Rank: Lieutenant
- Conflicts: Islamist uprising in Syria; Soviet-Afghan War; Syrian Civil War; Syrian Civil War spillover in Lebanon; Military intervention against ISIL; American-led intervention in Syria

Radwan Nammous (1950 – April 3, 2016; Arabic: رضوان ناموس), better known by his nom-de-guerre Abu Firas al-Suri (Arabic: أبو فراس السوري, romanized: ʾAbū Firās as-Sūrī), was a Syrian militant and former military officer who was a senior official in Al-Qaeda's Syrian affiliate Al-Nusra Front, serving as the group's spokesman.

== Early life and military career ==
Suri was born in 1950 in the Syrian town of Madaya, near Damascus. He joined the Syrian military in the 1970s and attained the rank of lieutenant but was discharged due to his Islamist leanings in 1979.

He then joined the Muslim Brotherhood in Syria where he became a militant and reportedly a military advisor to Marwan Hadid within the Muslim Brotherhood's Syrian affiliate, the Fighting Vanguard, during the Islamist uprising in Syria against the Hafez al-Assad regime between 1979 and 1980.

Following the failure of the Islamist uprising in Syria, al-Suri later travelled to Afghanistan and joined the Afghan Mujahideen to support their cause during the Soviet–Afghan War, where he met Abdullah Azzam, a founding father of modern jihadism, and Osama bin Laden. He then helped bin Laden and Pakistani jihadists establish Lashkar-e-Taiba, a terrorist organization that remains closely linked to Al-Qaeda to this day.

After the 9/11 attacks, al Suri helped the families of Al-Qaeda members escape Afghanistan. From 2003 to 2013 he was in Yemen, until the dispute between the Al-Nusra Front and the Islamic State of Iraq and the Levant erupted in Syria.

== Syrian Civil War ==
Due to the infighting between jihadist groups in Syria, Al Qaeda’s senior leaders dispatched al-Suri to Syria, where he participated in failed mediation efforts between al-Nusra Front and ISIL.

=== Role within the al-Nusra Front ===
Al-Suri's role as a senior figure in the al-Nusra Front was not publicly known until March 2014 when he appeared in a Nusra video speaking against ISIL. In the following months. al-Suri took on an increasingly prominent role within al-Nusra. Al-Suri became a spokesman for events such as the group's hostage taking of UN peacekeepers in 2014. In July 2014, an audio recording of a major rally of fighters in Syria was leaked. In it, al-Suri could be heard introducing Ahmed al-Sharaa, al-Nusra’s emir, who spoke of establishing an Islamic emirate in Syria. In a video released by al-Nusra on 8 August 2014, al-Suri said al-Nusra would declare an emirate in Syria only after consulting with other factions.

The American Bilal Abdul Kareem interviewed Abu Firas in Syria, in which Abu Firas said that the ultimate aims of his people did not just include Syria, but they were merely fighting in Syria for the time being. Bilal's interview of Abu Firas was shown in an Al-Qaeda video released by Al-Qaeda leader Ayman al-Zawahiri called "Three Sheikhs of Jihad".

Abu Firas appeared in an al-Nusra video which released more information on him, such as his previous Muslim Brotherhood affiliation and his association with bin Laden and Abdullah Azzam. Abu Firas al-Suri and Abu Sulayman al-Muhajir appeared in "The Heirs of Glory" a video released by the Al-Nusra Front, which vowed to bring back the caliphate, included old audio by Osama bin Laden (such as his 1998 announcement that "So we seek to incite the Islamic Nation so it may rise to liberate its lands and perform Jihad in the path of Allah, and to establish the law of Allah, so the Word of Allah may be supreme"). The video glorified the September 11 attacks and the Islamists Sayyid Qutb and Abdullah Azzam.

Ahrar ash-Sham was criticized by Abu Firas. Ahrar was attacked for listening to Turkey and Qatar asking for a split between al Qaeda and Nusra and Ahrar trying to gain support from the west, Turkey, and Qatar. Abu Firas's criticism was expounded on to Ahrar by Abu Qatada. His article was criticized by Abu Abdullah al-Shami.

Ahrar's alleged compliance with non-Muslims was Abu Firas's criticism. Ahrar was compared to a non-virgin girl by Abu Firas. The approval of the Revolutionary covenant of May 2014 was deemed as "nationalism" of Ahrar by Abu Firas. Abu Ammar al Shami rebuked Abu Firas Al Suri over Ahrar criticism. A photo of Abu Khaled al-Suri, Hassan Abboud of Ahrar ash-Sham, and Abu Firas al-Suri was released.

In an article published in the 19th edition of the Turkistan Islamic Party's magazine "Islamic Turkistan", Radwan Nammous (Abu Firas al-Suri) denounced the United Nations, secularism, civility and democracy. "Doğu Türkistan Haber Ajansı" published a Turkish language version of an interview between Nusra Magazine El Risale and Abu Firas al-Suri.

== Death ==
On 3 April 2016, Abu Firas al-Suri (at the age of 65), his son and 20 other al-Qaeda-linked al-Nusra Front fighters were killed in a US airstrike in Syria's Idlib province.

Ahrar leader Abdul Razzaq Al Mahdi tweeted his condolences upon Abu Firas's death. Nusra disseminated a biography of Abu Firas al-Suri after his death by the US airstrike.
