= Issam al-Attar =

Muslim Brotherhood leader

- عصام العطار

Personal life
- Born: 1927 Damascus, French Syria
- Died: 3 May 2024 (aged 96–97) Aachen, North Rhine-Westphalia, Germany
- Citizenship: Syrian
- Relations: Mohammed Reda al-Attar (father); Najah al-Attar (sister); Ali Al-Tantawi (father-in-law); Ali Ghaleb Himmat (son-in-law)

Religious life
- Religion: Islam
- Denomination: Sunni
- Movement: Salafiyya

Muslim leader
- Predecessor: Mustafa al-Siba'i
- Successor: Adnan Saad al-Din

Supreme Guide of the Syrian Muslim Brotherhood
- In office 1961–1973
- Deputy: Ali Sadreddine Al-Bayanouni
- Preceded by: Mustafa al-Siba'i
- Succeeded by: Abd al-Fattah Abu Ghudda

Issam al-Attar (Arabic: عصام العطار; 1927 – 3 May 2024) was a Syrian dissident politician and Islamic preacher who was the former leader of the Muslim Brotherhood in Syria. He was a symbol of dissent and resistance against the rule of Hafez al-Assad during the 1970s, and was later forced into exile in Aachen, Germany where he resided for the remainder of his life.

== Biography ==
Al-Attar was born in 1927 in Damascus, Syria. His father was the jurist Mohammed Reda al-Attar. As an eleven-year-old, he became a member of the Shabab Muhammad (Youths of Muhammad) political group, which was founded by Mustafa al-Siba'i, who later became the first head of the Muslim Brotherhood in Syria. Following his criticism of Adib Shishakli in 1951, he was forced to settle in Egypt, where he met Sayyid Qutb, Mohamed Bachir El Ibrahimi, Mahmoud Mohamed Shaker and Abd al-Wahhāb Azzām. Later on, he returned to Syria following his father's illness. In 1954, he accompanied Hassan al-Hudaybi during his visit to Syria. He was a vehement opponent of the United Arab Republic, fearing police state repression against the Islamists, in which he was arrested several times during the existence of the Union. He became the second Supreme Guide of the Syrian Muslim Brotherhood, taking over from its founder al-Siba'i, in 1961.

He was denied re-entry to Syria by the newly installed Ba'athist government following a Hajj trip to Mecca in 1963. He later stayed in Lebanon until he left for Europe in 1966 and found a job at an Islamic center in West Berlin.

He led the Talaa'i organization in Germany since the late 1970s, working mostly with non-Syrian Muslims, which was centered around the Bilal Mosque in Aachen. In the meantime, he consulted with the Syrian Muslim Brotherhood on Syria-related issues. During the Islamist uprising in Syria, al-Attar appealed to the Muslim Brotherhood members who remained in Syria with a call for non-violence. After the catastrophic outcome of the uprising, al-Attar was accused of being too reserved towards the Assad regime at a congress in Baden-Baden in 1982 by other Syrian Muslim Brotherhood members. In 1992, Syrian President Hafez al-Assad made an offer to al-Attar to return to Syria, which he rejected. During the Syrian revolution, he emphasized unity and modernity, rejecting sectarian conflict and prioritizing national development over regime change.

Al-Attar died on 3 May 2024 in Aachen, Germany, at the age of 97.

== Personal life ==
His sister, Najah al-Attar was the Vice President of Syria and is the only woman to have served in the post, which she held from 2006 to 2024. Previously she was Minister of Culture from 1976 to 2000. His wife Banan, daughter of Ali Al-Tantawi, was assassinated at her father's home in Aachen by a death squad sent by the Assad regime on 17 March 1981. One of his daughters married Ali Ghaleb Himmat.

== See also ==
- Muslim Brotherhood of Syria

== Sources ==
- Beissel, Manfred (2007). Chronik der Stadt Aachen von 1976 bis 2007 (PDF) (in German). Stadt Aachen: Fachbereich Verwaltungsleitung.
- Moubayed, Sami M. (2006). Steel & Silk: Men and Women who Shaped Syria 1900-2000. Seattle: Cune. ISBN 9781885942401.
- Pargeter, Alison (2013). The Muslim Brotherhood: From Opposition to Power. London: Saqi. ISBN 9780863568596.
- Schneiders, Thorsten Gerald (2013). Die Araber im 21. Jahrhundert: Politik, Gesellschaft, Kultur (in German). Springer Fachmedien Wiesbaden. ISBN 9783531185262.
