= Struggle Companies (Syria) =

Commando force in Syria

Struggle Companies / Struggle Brigades
- سرايا الصراع
- Active: 1973 – Unknown (dissolved)
- Country: Ba'athist Syria
- Allegiance: Syrian Arab Armed Forces (Ba'athist Syria)
- Type: Praetorian guard Shock troops Special forces
- Role: Airborne forces Close-quarters combat Counter-insurgency; Raiding; Direct action Special operations Unconventional warfare
- Size: 5,000 (peak in 1990)
- Garrison/HQ: Damascus
- Engagements: Islamist uprising in Syria: Hama massacre

Commanders
- Ceremonial chief: Hafez al-Assad
- Notable commanders: Adnan al-Assad; Muhammad al-Assa

The Struggle Companies (Arabic: سرايا الصراع; Saraya al-Sira) was a 5,000-strong commando force deployed around the Syrian capital Damascus. It was created in 1973 and commanded by Maj. Gen Adnan Assad, a cousin of the late Syrian president, Hafez al-Assad. The all Alawite Struggle Companies are broadly similar to the Defense Companies and were fanatically loyal to the Syrian government and were heavily used during the 1982 Hama massacre.

The Syrian president exercised direct control over the Saraya al-Sira', Saraya al-Difa', and the Republican Guard all of whom function as a Praetorian Guard. The headquarters of the Saraya al-Sira' was Mezzeh Military Airport.

The Saraya al-Sira' wore combat uniforms quite distinct from the regular Syrian military, their uniform consisted of lizard-patterned camouflage fatigues worn with Soviet combat boots, helmets and bulletproof vests. Headgear consisted of a red or orange beret.

== See also ==
- Defense Companies (Syria)
- Shabiha

== Sources ==
- Arabs at War: Military Effectiveness 1948-91, Kenneth M. Pollack, University of Nebraska Press, Lincoln and London, 2002, and Pollack's book reviewed in International Security, Vol. 28, No. 2
- Arab Armies of the Middle East Wars (Men-at-Arms, 194) by Samuel Katz, Osprey Publishing 1988, ISBN 978-0-85045-800-8
- Armies in Lebanon 1982 to 1984 (Men at Arms Series, 165) by Samuel Katz and Ronald Volstad, Osprey Publishing 1985, ISBN 978-0-85045-602-8
