= Siege of Aleppo (1980) =

Event in the Islamic uprising in Syria

Coordinates: 36.198133°N 37.16328°E

- Part of Islamist uprising in Syria
- Marked in red is the Citadel, which was utilised as a main base by government forces in the city. Marked in green are districts which saw either heavy clampdowns or massacres by government forces.
| Date | 1 April 1980 – February 1981 |
| Location | Aleppo, Syria |
| Result | Syrian government victory: Uprising suppressed; Syrian Muslim Brotherhood outlawed |

Belligerents
| Muslim Brotherhood | (Ba'athist Syria) Syria |

Commanders and leaders
| Husni 'Abo † ʽAdnan ʽUqla | Shafiq Fayadh; Hashem Mualla |

Units involved
| Kata'ib Muhammad; Fighting Vanguard | 3rd Armoured Division; 14th Special Forces Division; Defense Companies |

Strength
| Several thousand fighters | 30,000 |

Casualties and losses
| 2,000 dead 8,000–10,000 arrested | 300 dead |

The siege of Aleppo refers to a military operation conducted by forces of the Ba'athist Syria led by Hafez al-Assad in 1980 during the armed conflict between the Sunni Islamist insurgents, including the Muslim Brotherhood, and the Ba'athist Syrian regime. Ba'athist Syrian forces committed several massacres in the course of the operation.

== Background ==
=== Protests and violence ===
Aleppo has traditionally been seen as Syria's most important city after Damascus, and was an important center to members of Syria's democratic and secular opposition as well as the armed Islamist opposition. The city was the scene of the Aleppo Artillery School massacre in June 1979, and also witnessed running battles and clashes between government security forces and the Islamist opposition in Autumn 1979. Armed cells of radical Islamist opposition attacked police patrols and government as a result, Syrian's government military and security forces launched a crackdown resulting in many casualties.

Government security forces clamped down on the opposition, raiding opposition centers and meeting places. Government security forces were composed of 5,000 soldiers of the Defense Brigades, as well as thousands of members of the police and various other state security organizations. In spite of the heavy government presence large sections of Aleppo fell out of the control of the Syrian state.

=== Surge in opposition activity ===
Violence in the city exploded in November 1979, after security forces arrested Shaykh Zain al-Din Khairalla, a leading voice amongst Islamists and a regular leader of Friday prayers in the Great Mosque of Aleppo. Following the arrest opposition activity and violence increased exponentially, with daily demonstrations, strikes, and boycotts, and increased attacks on Ba'ath Party offices. The Islamist opposition were the biggest threat to the state, as they were the best armed and organized, although the secular opposition threatened the Ba'athist state due to its wide support amongst the middle classes, as well as minority groups opposed to the Islamists.

== Operation ==
=== Crackdown ===
In early March 1980 the Syrian Muslim Brotherhood closed down the business district of Aleppo for two weeks. The strikes spurred sympathy strikes in other cities including Hama, Homs, Idlib, Deir ez-Zor, and Hasaka.

In response both to the strikes and the general increase in opposition activity, in mid March units of the 3rd Division of the Syrian Arab Armed Forces were redeployed to Aleppo from Damascus and Lebanon. The Division was reinforced with Special Forces units as well as additional units of the Defense Brigades. Syrian government forces, comprising some 30,000 men from units considered both elite and loyal, surrounded and sealed off the city of Aleppo.

The Special Forces units entered the city first, on 1 April 1980. The 3rd Division in turn deployed in force on 6 April. The Division deployed their soldiers alongside hundreds of tanks and armoured vehicles, which engaged in a brutal crackdown, often firing indiscriminately at residential properties. Government force would seal off neighborhoods, and then search house to house for suspects and weapons. Gen. Shafiq Fayadh was reported to have stood on a tank on 5 April, and announced his willingness to "kill a thousand people a day to rid the city of the Muslim Brother vermins."

The government offensive had resulted in hundreds of civilian deaths by mid April, whilst many more were detained at detention sites spread throughout the city. Special Forces units set up a prison camp in the Citadel.

=== Insurgency and massacres ===
Government forces had largely regained control of the city by May, although the situation remained tense. However new violence flared in the summer of 1980. In retaliation for an attack on a government patrol, Special Forces units rounded up males at random in the Suq al-Ahad quarter on 1 July. The units rounded up a random group of 200 males aged fifteen and over, and then proceeded to open fire on them killing 42 and wounding over a hundred and fifty.

==== Al-Masharqah massacre ====
On the morning of Eid al-Fitr, 11 August 1980, in response to another attack on a government patrol, Special Forces commander Hashem Mualla submitted orders for his men to surround the neighborhood of al-Masharqah, and ordered discharge of random people from their homes. These people were then marched to a nearby cemetery. Near the tomb of Ibrahim Hananu the units were ordered to fire, killing between 83 and 100 citizens, mostly children. Several hundred more were injured. Later, bulldozers buried the bodies, while some of them were still alive. Reinforcing the random nature of the selection process, some of those killed included Ba'ath party members, government workers, and other government supporters.

==== Bustan Al-Qasr massacre ====
The day after the Eid al-Fitr massacre in al-Masharqah neighborhood, the Third Armored Division occupied Aleppo and 35 citizens were taken from their homes and shot dead.

== Result ==
=== Casualties ===
An estimated 1,000–2,000 people were killed by the security forces during the siege, either during clashes, at random, or as part of summary executions. At least 8,000 were arrested, with other sources talking of 10,000 prisoners. From 1979 to 1981 Muslim Brotherhood forces killed over 300 people in Aleppo; nearly all of whom were Ba'athist officials of Alawites, but also including some clerics who had denounced these killings and the Brotherhood's armed terrorist campaign.

== See also ==
- 2004 Al-Qamishli riots
- Black September in Jordan
- History of Syria, Baath Party rule under Hafez al-Assad
- Battle of Aleppo (2012–2016)
- List of massacres in Syria
- List of modern conflicts in the Middle East
