= Terrorism in Ba'athist Syria =

Terrorism in Ba'athist Syria had a long history dating from the state-terrorism deployed by the Ba'athist government since its seizure of power through a violent coup in 1963 until the fall of the Assad regime in 2024. The Ba'athist Assad regime deployed various types of state terrorism; such as ethnic cleansing, forced deportations, massacres, summary executions, mass rapes and other forms of violence to maintain its totalitarian rule in Syria. The most extensive use of state terrorism in the 21st century was the violence unleashed against civilians during the Ba'athist regime's crackdown of the Syrian revolution and the subsequent Syrian civil war.

When the Arab Spring spread to Syria in 2011, the Ba'athist security apparatus launched a brutal crackdown against peaceful protestors calling for freedom and dignity, which killed thousands of civilians and deteriorated into a full-scale civil war. Taking advantage of the situation, transnational Jihadist groups like Islamic State and al-Nusra began to emerge, emulating the deadly terrorist tactics of the Assad regime.

After over a decade of war, the country has been devastated, with over 600,000 deaths and millions have been displaced, sparking the largest refugee crisis in the world. Syrian military and Ba'athist security forces have systematically unleashed scorched earth tactics on populations it deemed hostile; receiving international condemnation. These include hundreds of chemical attacks, massacres, torture, mass rapes, ethnic cleansing, forced disappearances and various other acts of state terror under orders from the highest echelons of the Ba'athist regime.

== History ==
=== Under Hafez al-Assad ===
==== Islamist uprising ====
From 1976 to 1982, Sunni Islamists fought the secular Ba'ath Party-controlled government of Syria in what has been labelled by the Arab Socialist Ba'ath party as a "long campaign of terror".

The Muslim Brotherhood was blamed for the terror by the government, although the insurgents used names such as Kata'ib Muhammad (Phalanges of Muhammad, begun in Hama in 1965 Marwan Hadid) to refer to their organization.

Following Syrian occupation of Lebanon in 1976 a number of prominent Syrian officers and government servants, as well as "professional men, doctors, teachers," were assassinated. Most of the victims were Alawis, "which suggested that the assassins had targeted the community" but "no one could be sure who was behind" the killings.

Among the better-known victims were:

- the commander of the Hama garrison, Colonel Ali Haydar, killed in October 1976
- the rector of Damascus University, Dr. Muhammad al-Fadl, killed in February 1977
- the commander of the missile corps, Brigadier 'Abd al Hamid Ruzzug, killed in June 1977
- Syrian dentist Ibrahim Na'ama, killed in March 1978
- the director of police affairs at the Ministry of the Interior, Colonel Ahmad Khalil, killed in August 1978
- Public Prosecutor 'Adil Mini of the Supreme State Security Court, killed in April 1979.
- President Hafez Assad's doctor, the neurologist Dr. Muhammad Shahada Khalil, who was killed in August 1979.

These assassinations led up to the 17 June 1979 slaughter of cadets at the Aleppo Artillery School. On that day a member of school staff, Captain Ibrahim Yusuf, assembled the cadets in the dining-hall and then let in gunmen who opened fire on them. According to the official report 32 men were killed. Unofficial sources say the death toll was as high as 83. This attack was the work of Tali'a muqatila, or Fighting Vanguard, a Sunni Islamist guerrilla group and spinoff of the Muslim Brotherhood. `Adnan `Uqla, who later became the group's leader, helped plan the massacre.

On 26 June 1980, the president of Syria, Hafez al-Assad, narrowly escaped death when attackers threw two grenades and fired machine gun bursts at him as he waited at a diplomatic function in Damascus.

While the involvement of the Syrian government "was not proved" in these killings, it "was widely suspected."

The insurgency is generally considered to have been crushed by the bloody Hama massacre of 1982, in which thousands were killed, "the vast majority innocent civilians".

===== Perpetrators =====
According to some sources, such as Syrian president Hafez al-Assad and journalist Robert Dreyfuss, the Muslim Brotherhood insurgents in Syria were aided by the Jordanian government in cooperation with Lebanese Phalangists, South Lebanon Army, and the right-wing Israeli government of Menachem Begin, who allegedly supported, funded and armed the Muslim Brotherhood in an effort to overthrow the government of President Assad.

We are not just dealing with killers inside Syria, but with those who masterminded their plans. The plot thickened after Sadat's visit to Jerusalem and many foreign intelligence services became involved. Those who took part in Camp David used the Muslim Brothers against us.

The South Lebanese Army allegedly set up camps to help train the Muslim Brotherhood insurgents. Both Israel and Syria had troops in Lebanon and clashed over domination of that country. Syria's Arab nationalist government has supported the overthrow of the Royalist, pro-Western Jordanian government.

==== 1986 bombings ====
In 1986 a series of bombings, mainly around the capital of Damascus, caused hundreds of casualties. Iraqi Ba'athis agents were blamed for the acts.

=== Under Bashar al-Assad ===
==== 2000s ====
On 28 September 2008, at least 17 people been killed and 14 hurt by a car bomb on the outskirts of Syria's capital Damascus. The target of the blast was unclear, but it struck close to an important Shia shrine and a security post.

A little more than year later (on 3 December 2009) another explosion killed at least three people when a bus blew up in a Damascus suburb. Syrian officials denied terrorism was involved.

==== During the Syrian Civil War ====
The Syrian government repeatedly claimed that the actions of security forces against the Syrian Civil War were a response to armed attacks by "terrorist gangs", a claim rejected by western humans rights groups, Western governments, and other observers.

At least 80 suicide bombings had been recorded in the conflict by the end of November 2012. Both the government and the opposition have accused each other of perpetrating the bombings. Only "shadowy Islamist groups" (one being Al-Nusra Front), possibly affiliated with Al-Qaeda, have claimed responsibility; Al-Nusra took responsibility for 57 of them. At least one such bombing claimed to be in retaliation for Syrian government attacks on residential areas, but also struck a sectarian tone: "We tell this regime: Stop your massacres against the Sunni people. If not, you will bear the sin of the Alawites. What is coming will be more calamitous, God willing." Observers believe such groups have made inroads in Syria, capitalizing on the instability resulting from the uprising.

The Syrian government itself has been accused of terror or state terrorism. September 5, 2012 Turkish Prime Minister Recep Tayyip Erdoğan stated, "The regime has become one of state terrorism. Syria is going through a huge humanitarian saga. Unfortunately, as usual, the international community is merely watching the slaughter, massacre and the elimination of Muslims."

The tactic of shelling, invading, and killing, but then retreating from civilian areas has reportedly been used in several areas ringing Damascus in July and August 2012, such as Kafr Sousa, where tanks backed by infantry left at least 24 people dead before leaving according to pro-opposition Syrian Observatory for Human Rights. According to Salem, "terror is the basic approach" of the government. "From the beginning of the uprising the logic was hit and hit hard, punish and scare," the opposite of the "winning hearts and minds" model. 'The New York Times' journalist Damien Cave describes the government's approach as following the saying "rule is based on awe."

On September 15, 2019, eight civilians died and seven others injured in a car-bomb explosion near a hospital in the northern province of Aleppo. No side claimed responsibility for the attack.

=== Cooperation with Iraq ===
Syrian President Bashar Assad met with Iraqi President Jalal Talabani in Syria on 21 January 2007 and discussed terrorism in the Middle East and the situation in Iraq. They issued a joint statement condemning "all forms of terrorism plaguing the Iraqi people and their institutions, infrastructure and security service." Assad and Talabani expressed "readiness to work together and do everything possible to eradicate terrorism."

=== Syrian state-sponsored terrorism ===
The Syrian government itself has been accused of engaging in state sponsored terrorism by President George W. Bush and by the U.S. State Department from 1979 to today. The European Community met on 10 November 1986 to discuss the Hindawi affair, an attempt to bomb an El Al flight out of London, and the subsequent arrest and trial in the UK of Nizar Hindawi, who allegedly received Syrian government support after the bombing, and possibly beforehand. The European response was to impose sanctions against Syria and state that these measures were intended "to send Syria the clearest possible message that what has happened is absolutely unacceptable."

However, Syria has assisted the United States and other governments in their opposition to al-Qaeda. This include Syria's efforts in stemming the flow of al-Qaeda backed fighters from crossing into Iraq along its border. (Country Reports on Terrorism, Office of the Coordinator for Counterterrorism, 27 April 2005).

Before the Syrian Civil War, Hamas members received military style training in Iran and in Syria.

In 2012, Lebanon charged former Lebanese Minister Michel Samaha and a high-ranking Syrian military official, Syria's National Security Bureau chief Ali Mamlouk, with being involved in a terror plot aimed at destabilizing Lebanon. Samaha is a longtime ally, and friend, of Syrian President Bashar Assad and Ali Mamlouk. Samaha reportedly confessed to his involvement in the terror plot, and some Lebanese politicians have called to break ties with the Assad government.

During the probe, it was alleged that Syrian President Bashar Assad gave direct orders to execute terrorist attacks in Lebanon, and Michel Samaha admitted that he was working for Assad's government in trying to execute a plan to detonate explosives in Akkar, Lebanon. Samaha admitted to collaborating with General Ali Mamlouk, who heads the Syrian national security bureau.

Numerous assassinations of opponents of Syria and the Syrian government have been alleged to involve the Syrian government. Syria and its supporters claim that no substantial evidence has been produced to prove these allegations.

- (December 2005) Gebran Tueni, an anti-Syrian journalist and lawmaker was assassinated.
- (September 2005) May Chidiac an anti-Syrian journalist and political commentator was severely injured in an assassination attempt against her life.
- (June 2005) Samir Kassir, an anti-Syrian journalist was assassinated.
- (February 2005) Rafic Hariri was killed by a car bomb which killed ten others. Hariri was a known opponent of the pro-Syrian policies of Émile Lahoud. The opposition parties in Lebanon accuse Syria of orchestrating the assassination.
- (July 1980) Assassination of Riad Taha, a prominent journalist.
- (March 1977) Assassination of Kamal Jumblatt, a prominent politician.

== See also ==
- United States and state-sponsored terrorism
