= Shafiq Fayadh =

Syrian Army officer

Shafiq al-Fayadh
- شفيق الفياض
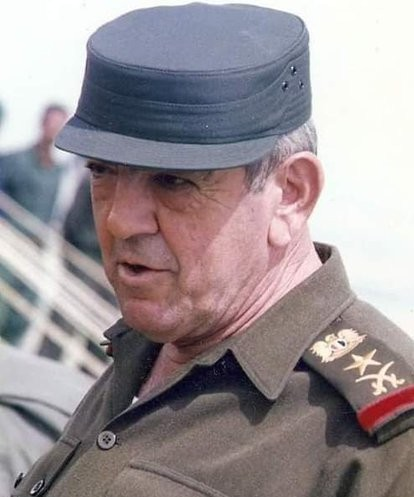
- al-Fayadh in 1980s
- Born: 1937; Ayn al-Arus, Jableh, First Syrian Republic
- Died: 8 October 2015 (aged 77–78)
- Relatives: Hafez al-Assad (cousin)
- Military career
- Allegiance: United Arab Republic (1959–1961); Second Syrian Republic (1961–1963); Ba'athist Syria (1963–2005)
- Branch: Syrian Arab Army
- Service years: 1959 – June 2005
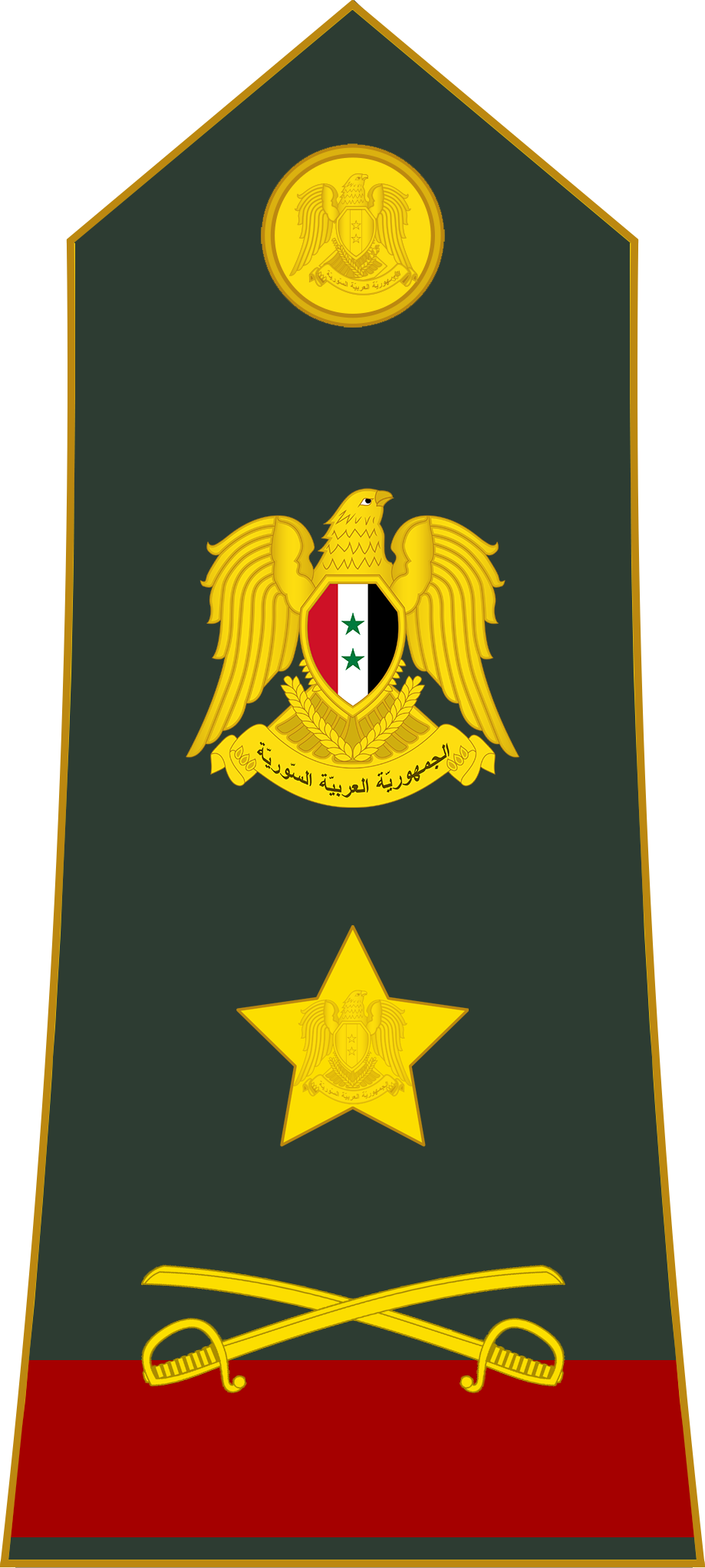
- Rank: Lieutenant General
- Commands: 3rd Division; Damascus Army Garrison
- Conflicts: Six-Day War; Yom Kippur War; Lebanese Civil War; Islamic Uprising in Syria; Siege of Aleppo; Hama Massacre

Shafiq al-Fayadh (1937 – 8 October 2015) (Arabic: شفيق الفياض) was a Syrian military officer and former commander of the Syrian Army's 3rd Division and a close adviser to President Hafez al-Assad. He was also one of the members of his inner circle.

== Early life ==
Fayadh was born in the village of Ayn al-Arus, near Jableh, to an Alawite family of the prominent Kalbiyya clan. Other members of the clan include Fayadh's cousin and former Syrian president Hafez al-Assad.

His son ‘Ala is married to Lamia, the daughter of Rifaat al-Assad. Another of his sons married into a Christian family, whilst another married into a Shiite family.

== Career ==
The 3rd Division under Fayadh played an extremely important role for the government of Hafez al-Assad. The unit, under Fayadh, was one of the first to go into Lebanon in 1976. Fayadh played an important role during the Islamic uprising in Syria, occupying Aleppo with the 3rd Division in 1980, and taking part in the Hama massacre. The Division was deployed near Damascus, in order to protect the government against potential coups.

Fayadh was retired in June 2005 as part of a restructuring program of the Syrian Army, five years after Bashar al-Assad had succeeded his father Hafez al-Assad as president.

== Death ==
Fayadh died on 8 October 2015, suffering from illness.
