= 1964 Hama riot =

Anti Baath Uprising

- Part of the Arab Cold War
- In green is Old Hama, which was the epicenter of the insurrection. In blue is the Sultan Mosque, which served as the rebel headquarters.
Date	April 1964
Location	Hama, Syria
Result	Insurrection suppressed

Belligerents
(Syria) Syrian Armed Forces (Syria) Workers' Battalions (Syria) National Guard of the Ba'ath Party	Muslim Brotherhood; Fighting Vanguard

Commanders and leaders
Amin al-Hafiz; President of Syria; Prime Minister of Syria; Hamad Ubayd; Commander of National Guard	Marwan Hadid (POW); Leader of the Fighting Vanguard; Mahmud al-Hamid (POW); Imam of Sultan Mosque; Saʽid Hawwa

Casualties and losses
300+ killed or captured	70-100 killed Several wounded and imprisoned.

The 1964 Hama riot was a major riot and insurrection that took place in Hama, a city in northern Syria, between the newly installed Ba'athist government of Syria and the Muslim Brotherhood in April 1964. It occurred following the 1963 Ba'athist coup d'état, that placed the Ba'ath Party in power.

The insurrection was brutally suppressed with heavy military force, resulting in many mortal casualties and partial destruction of the old Hama city neighborhoods. However, despite the government successfully crushing the insurrection, Hama continued to be a center of Islamists and a focal point of the Islamist uprising in Syria (1979–1982).

== Background ==
The first clash between the Ba'ath Party and the Muslim Brotherhood occurred shortly after the 1963 coup, in which the Ba'ath party gained power in Syria. The Islamist political groups, of which the Brotherhood was the most prominent, presented the most significant challenge to the Ba'athists, who had suppressed their Nasserist and Marxist rivals by mid-1963. The outlawing of Brotherhood in 1964 strongly contributed to the movement's radicalization. In 1964 and 1965, strikes and mass demonstrations spread throughout Syria's major cities, especially in Hama, and were crushed by the military.

The town of Hama in particular was a "stronghold of landed conservatism and of the Muslim Brothers," and "had long been a redoubtable opponent of the Ba'athist state," according to Syria expert Patrick Seale. The governments of Egypt and Iraq financially supported opposition to the Ba'athists although countrywide discontent was high nonetheless from the stagnation of the economy, merchants resenting the increasing regulations, incompetent governance, and resentment of the Ba'athist government's secretive decision-making.

== Riot ==
In April 1964 major disturbances occurred in several Syrian cities, with Hama forming the epicenter of the anti-government insurrection. Islamist insurgents in the city set up "roadblocks, stockpiled food and weapons, ransacked wine shops." The rebels were encouraged to revolt against the Ba'athists by the imam of the Sultan Mosque, Shaykh Mahmud al-Hamid, and were financed by some of the city's traditional merchant families. The Sultan Mosque would become the rebels headquarters, and it was used both as a sanctuary and to store weapons. After Munzir al-Shimali, an Ismaili Ba'athist militiaman, was killed and mutilated by rioters, riots intensified and rebels attacked "every vestige" of the Ba'ath Party in Hama.

Hamad Ubayd, the commander of the Ba'athist-dominated National Guard, called for and received tank support and reinforcements from the Syrian Army. Subsequently, neighborhoods where the rebels held sway were attacked with tank and artillery fire, forcing the rebels to withdraw into the Sultan Mosque after two days of fighting. President Amin al-Hafiz ordered for the rebels to be eliminated, and the mosque was subsequently bombarded, destroying the minaret where many of the rebels were positioned. The security forces thus managed to suppress the uprising. Some 70-100 members of the Muslim Brotherhood were killed, with many others wounded or captured and still more disappearing underground.

== Aftermath ==
A tribunal was set up to try imprisoned insurgents and was headed by Mustafa Tlass. Some prisoners were released, including Marwan Hadid, who was instrumental in organizing a second Islamist uprising in Hama years later. The shelling of the Sultan Mosque had outraged many Syrian Muslims and numerous countrywide strikes and demonstrations were held in protest. The opposition to the Ba'ath was wide-ranging, and included merchants, professionals, laborers and craftsmen and brought together poor Sunni Muslims from the countryside, members of the middle class and the traditional political and social elites. Hafiz felt compelled to resign in favor of a civilian politician, Salah al-Din al-Bitar, who was a member of the Ba'ath Party, but not from the officer corps. Al-Bitar publicly promised to protect civil liberties and announced a new provisional constitution. Bitar and other civilian members of the Ba'ath, such as Michel Aflaq, still held little sway over governmental decisions and both resigned from the government, with al-Hafiz re-occupying the prime minister post.

The events in Hama also caused a rupture within the Military Committee, the secretive junta that held prominent influence in the Syrian government since the 1963 coup. Muhammad Umran, the senior member of the Committee, disapproved of the severity of the assault on Hama and the subsequent bloodshed, while Salah Jadid and Hafez al-Assad strongly supported Hafiz's handling of the riots, viewing it as a necessary means to protect Ba'athist power against "class enemies."

In early 1980s, Hama became the epicenter of the countrywide Islamist uprising. The city experienced a massacre in April 1981, with hundreds killed. The situation deteriorated further in early February 1982, when Islamist groups took over the city. In the ensuing army operation to oust them, most of Hama was destroyed and thousands of its residents were killed.

== See also ==
- Syrian Civil War
- Human rights in Syria
- List of modern conflicts in the Middle East

== Bibliography ==
- Dumper, Michael; Stanley, Bruce E.; Abu-Lughod, Janet L. (2007), Cities of the Middle East and North Africa: A Historical Encyclopedia, ABC-CLIO, ISBN 9781576079195
- Seale, Patrick (1990). Asad: The Struggle for the Middle East. University of California Press. ISBN 978-0-520-06976-3.
