= Abu Musab =

Abu Musab may refer to:

- Abu Musab al-Barnawi, Nigerian Islamic militant
- Ahmad Fadeel al-Nazal al-Khalayleh, also known as Abu Musab al-Zarqawi
- Mustafa Setmariam Nasar, also known as Abu Musab al-Suri
- Mohamedou Ould Salahi, Mauritanian former detainee at the Guantánamo Bay detention camp
