= Abu Khalid al-Suri =

Syrian Islamist militant (1956–2014)

- أبو خالد السوري
- Born: Mohamed al-Bahaiya; January 1, 1956; Aleppo, Syria
- Died: February 23, 2014 (aged 58); Aleppo, Syria
- Cause of death: Suicide bombing
- Military career
- Allegiance: Ahrar al-Sham; Affiliated with Al-Qaeda; Ties to Muslim Brotherhood
- Service years: 1979–2014
- Rank: Senior leader
- Unit: Ahrar al-Sham
- Commands: Senior leadership, Ahrar al-Sham
- Known for: Co-founder of Ahrar al-Sham; Appointed mediator between Al-Nusra Front and ISIL by Ayman al-Zawahiri; Close ties to Osama bin Laden and Abu Musab al-Suri
- Conflicts: Islamist uprising in Syria; Soviet–Afghan War; Bosnian War; Iraq War; Syrian Civil War

Abu Khalid al-Suri (Arabic: أبو خالد السوري; Abu Khalid 'the Syrian'; 1956 – 23 February 2014), also known as Mohamed al-Bahaiya or Abu Umayr al-Shami, was a Syrian Islamist insurgent who was often affiliated with the Muslim Brotherhood, Osama Bin Laden and the Syrian Islamist group Ahrar al-Sham. Al-Suri is also said to be a veteran, having participated in fighting in Afghanistan, Bosnia and Herzegovina, and Iraq. He was believed to be assassinated by an ISIL suicide attack in 2014, following the commencement of armed conflict between ISIL and other rebel and Islamist groups.

== Militant activity ==
Born in Aleppo, Syria, in 1956 as Mohamed al-Bahaiya, al-Suri's jihadist career has its roots in the failed Islamist uprising in Syria between 1979 and 1982, following which he fled Syria.

During the 1990s al-Suri coordinated closely with Abu-Musab al-Suri, a Spanish-Syrian jihadist. Together they worked to establish jihadi volunteer centers, training camps and various media groups in Afghanistan. While both men had good relations with Bin Laden and al-Qaeda, they both denied being members of al-Qaeda in a statement made in 1999. Around the time of the statement, al-Suri had been operating mostly out of Turkey and fled to Afghanistan.

Al-Suri was financially aided partly by Abd Al-Rahman al-Nuaimi, a Qatari national. Nuaimi is a purported human rights activist and co-founder of Alkarama. On December 18, 2013, Nuaimi was placed on the United States Treasury's Specially Designated Global Terror List (SDTG). Nuaimi is accused of transferring $600,000 to al-Suri and the intent to transfer approximately $50,000 more.

== Involvement in the Syrian Civil War and Ahrar al-Sham ==
In 2011, al-Suri co-founded Ahrar al-Sham, a Syrian Sunni Islamist group, opposing Bashar al-Assad's government forces as part of the Islamic Front. Despite helping to found al-Sham and serving in its most senior ranks, al-Suri's involvement in the organization were kept secret, and he adopted a new nom de guerre: Abu Omeir al-Shami. Al Suri continued to use both names separately in statements, but it was not until after his death that the two were linked as the same person.

In early 2013 infighting began between al-Qaeda's al-Nusra Front and ISIL (then known only as ISI). It began with a recorded announcement on April 8 by ISI's leader Abu Bakr al-Baghdadi announcing an unauthorized merger between the two groups. Disagreements and conflicts between the two escalated by the end of 2013. Hostilities continued to worsen, with al-Nusra's leader, Ahmed al-Sharaa, claiming in a 2014 interview that he saw no end to the conflict.

In May 2013, the leader of al-Qaeda, Ayman al-Zawahiri, sent a secret letter to al-Baghdadi in the hopes of quelling tensions between their two groups. The letter, dated 23 May 2013, asserts al-Qaeda's dominance and names al-Suri as the mediator between al-Nusra Front and ISIL in Syria.

== Assassination ==
On 23 February 2014, five ISIL gunmen entered al-Suri's headquarter compound in Aleppo and opened fire, then one of the ISIL gunmen detonated his explosive suicide belt. The attack killed al-Suri and six of his men.

Syrian rebels mourned al-Suri's death on social media accounts, posting his photo and praising his actions in support of jihad. Al-Qaeda published a eulogy for al-Suri written by Saif al-Adel and uploaded a video of him at the al-Farouq training camp in Afghanistan, along with photos of him with Bin Laden.

A rebel source was quoted saying "Sheikh Abu Khalid was an important Jihadi figure, he fought the Americans in Iraq and in Afghanistan. They (ISIL) gave the Americans a present, a free gift, by killing him."

Abu Khalid received condolences from Nusra Front member Abu Sulayman al Muhajir.

Abu Khalid was praised by the Mujahideen Shura Council in the Environs of Jerusalem's media branch Ibn Taymiyya Media Center.

Abu Khalid received condolences from Al-Qaeda leader Ayman al-Zawahiri. Abu Firas al-Suri and Abu Khalid were praised in an Al-Qaeda video released by al-Zawahiri called "Three Sheikhs of Jihad".

The leader of al-Nusra Front, al-Julani threatened to go to war with ISIL over their suspected role in the killing of Abu Khalid al-Suri. Al-Julani gave ISIL five days to submit evidence that they were innocent of the attack.

Abu Khalid appeared in photos with Ahrar ash-Sham chief Hassan Abboud. A photo of Abu Khaled al-Suri, Hassan Abboud, and Abu Firas al-Suri was released.

Abu Khaled al-Suri was mentioned by Abu Firas al-Suri in a Nusra video which released more information on Abu Firas, such as his previous Muslim Brotherhood affiliation and his association with bin Laden and Abdullah Azzam.
