= Abu Dahdah =

Syrian-born Spaniard, member of al-Qaeda

Imad Eddin Barakat Yarkas alias Abu Dahdah (Arabic: أبو الدحداح 'Abū ad-Daḥdāh) is a Syrian-born Spaniard initially sentenced to a 27-year prison term in Spain for his part in the September 11 attacks and for his membership of the banned terrorist organization al-Qaeda. However, on 16 February 2006, the Spanish Supreme Court reduced the Abu Dahdah penalty to 12 years because it considered that his participation in the conspiracy was not proven. He is thought to have been a high-ranking member of al-Qaeda's Madrid component.

Some reports said that Yarkas's telephone number was found in a Hamburg apartment rented by lead hijacker Mohamed Atta, while others say he was mentioned by name in a diary seized by police in a search of an anonymous apartment, or that his passport had been seized in a raid on the London home of Abu Qatada.

He is said to have visited Indonesia and Malaysia in the years prior to the attacks, while he was being watched by Spanish authorities.

Dahdah was one of 11 people arrested on 19 November 2001, and charged with fundraising for al-Qaeda operatives, and his alleged role in convincing youths to attend camps in Afghanistan, camps run by his associates Anwar Adnan Mohamed Salah and Mustafa Setmariam Nasar. He was also said to lead the group Soldiers of Allah, which included Abdulla Khayata, Osama Darra, Jasem Mahboule, Mohamed Needl, Mohamed Zaher, José Luis Galán, Sadik Meriziak, Abdulaziz Benyaich, Najib Chaib, Hassan Al Hussein, and Mohamed Ghaleb Kalaje. His trial began 22 April, and Dahdah pleaded not guilty, maintaining his innocence.

Although prosecutor Pedro Rubira had sought 74,337 years imprisonment, Dahdah was sentenced to 15 years for conspiracy to commit terrorist murders, and another 12 years for leading a terrorist organization, the sentences to be served consecutively.

While serving his third year in prison, Dahdah was accused by intelligence officer Rafael Gómez Menor who reported to the Congress of Deputies that the Madrid train bombings in 2004 had been "Abu Dahdah, without any doubt". It was alleged that he helped direct the operations during prison visits from Walid al-Masri.

Dahdah's sentence was later reduced by the Supreme Court of Spain, which ruled that the conspiracy charges were unproven. After serving 12 years, Dahdah was released from prison in May 2013.
