= Ramouseh =

Suburb of Aleppo Syria

Coordinates: 36.158°N 37.132°E

Ramouseh (Arabic: الرَّامُوْسَة, romanized: ar-Rāmūsa) is a suburb of Aleppo, Syria, that has an industrial zone and a major bus station for intercity lines.

Formerly a village near Aleppo, it was the site where Sayf al-Dawla's army would camp (Yāqūt) in the 10th century. A battle between an army from Aleppo and an invading army from Damascus took place there during a war between the two cities in February/March 1602 (ʾAl-Ghazziyy). The Artillery School massacre took place in Ramouseh on June 16, 1979. In August 2016, it was the site of intense fighting between the Syrian Army and various rebel factions during the Syrian Civil War.
