= Aleppo Artillery School massacre =

1979 sectarian killing in Syria

- Part of Islamist uprising in Syria
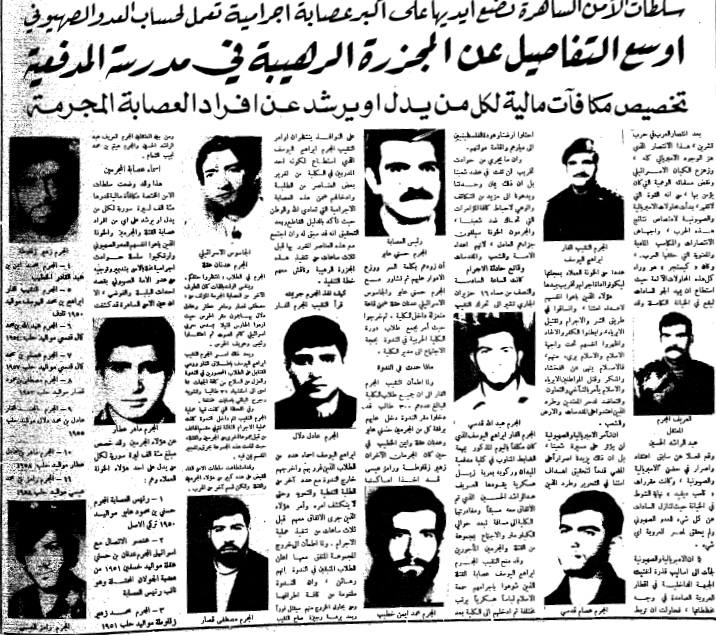
- Syrian newspaper reports on incident
- Location: Aleppo, Syria
- Date: 16 June 1979
- Target: Syrian Army cadets
- Attack type: Execution
- Weapons: Guns, grenades
- Deaths: 83
- Perpetrator: Fighting Vanguard

The Aleppo Artillery School massacre was a sectarian massacre of Syrian Army cadets on 16 June 1979. It was carried out by a handful of members of the Muslim Brotherhood's Fighting Vanguard led by Adnan Uqla and Ibrahim al-Youssef, without the permission of the leader of the Fighting Vanguard, Hisham Jumbaz. The Muslim Brotherhood in Syria later tried to cover up their involvement in the massacre by condemning it, but the Syrian government decided to conduct a large-scale crackdown against it to prevent any reoccurrence.

== Massacre ==
The massacre occurred on 16 June 1979, in the Ramouseh district of the city of Aleppo, Syria, at the Aleppo Artillery School. An officer on duty, Ibrahim al-Youssef, and members of the Fighting Vanguard (at-Tali’a al-Muqatila) and led by ʿAdnan ʿUqla, massacred 83 Alawi cadets in the Aleppo Artillery School. The duty officer in charge of the school called Alawite cadets to an urgent morning meeting in the mess hall of the school; when they arrived, he and his accomplices opened fire on the unarmed cadets with automatic weapons and grenades. The incident marked the beginning of full scale urban warfare of the Syrian Muslim Brotherhood against the ruling Alawites.

== Reaction ==
On 22 June, the Syrian interior minister, Adnan al-Dabbagh, accused the Muslim Brotherhood of the massacre. Although the principal targets were members of the Alawite sect, the Syrian Minister of Information, Ahmad Iskander Ahmad, stated that the murdered cadets also included Christians and Sunni Muslims. In a statement distributed on 24 June, the Muslim Brotherhood organization denied that it had any prior knowledge of the massacre nor involvement in it. It also accused the Syrian government, then led by the Alawite President Hafez al-Assad, of trying to tarnish the image of the Muslim Brotherhood, speculatively because it was influential among the Syrian public. Overall, Syrian Islamists differed in their response to the massacre, however, with differing beliefs about the role of this kind of violence as a resistance tactic against the regime.

The Syrian government responded by sentencing to death an estimated 15 prisoners belonging to the "Islamic resistance movement," all of whom were also accused of being Iraqi agents. Following the massacre, terrorist attacks became almost a daily occurrence, particularly in Aleppo and other northern cities. The government usually attributed these attacks to the Muslim Brotherhood, but as the armed resistance gained wider popular support and other, loosely defined, armed groups appeared, it became difficult to determine the extent of the Brotherhood's involvement.

== See also ==
- Siege of Aleppo (1980)
