= Brynjar Lia =

Norwegian historian (born 1966)

Brynjar Lia (born 14 July 1966) is a Norwegian historian and professor of Middle East Studies at Department of Culture Studies and Oriental Languages at the University of Oslo. He is also an adjunct research professor at the Norwegian Defence Research Establishment (FFI) where he headed FFI's research on international terrorism and global jihadism between 1999 and 2011. Lia is viewed as one of Norway's foremost experts on terrorism and is much cited in Norwegian and international media in connection to Al-Qaeda and international terrorism. Lia's last book is about Abu Musab al-Suri, which has been reviewed in publications like Newsweek, The Economist, London Review of Books, and The New York Review of Books.

== Bibliography of books in English ==
- Architect of Global Jihad: The Life of Al Qaeda Strategist Abu Mus'ab Al-Suri (Columbia Univ. Press, 2008)
- Building Arafat's Police: The Politics of International Police Assistance in the Palestinian Territories After the Oslo Agreement (Ithaca Press, 2007)
- A Police Force Without a State: A History of the Palestinian Security Forces in the West Bank And Gaza (Ithaca Press, 2006)
- Globalisation and the Future of Terrorism: Patterns and Predictions (Routledge, 2005)
- The Society of the Muslim Brothers in Egypt 1928-42 (Ithaca Press, 1998)
