= Voice of Arab Syria =

Radia channel

The Voice of Arab Syria (Arabic: صوت سورية العربية) was a Baghdad-based radio channel, broadcasting to a Syrian audience.

Voice of Arab Syria began broadcasting on 26 October 1976, at the time of the Arab summit in Cairo. It did daily broadcasts, providing a platform for opponents of the Assad government to speak out. The location of the broadcaster was undisclosed, but Radio Baghdad first announced the new radio channel. Voice of Arab Syria called on the people and army of Syria to revolt against the al-Assad government.

Voice of Arab Syria was closed down in June 1997, as relations between the governments of Syria and Iraq improved (similarly, Syria shut down its Voice of Iraq broadcasts).
