= Islamist uprising in Syria =

Armed resistance against Syrian Ba'athist rule from 1976 to 1982

- Part of the Arab Cold War and Assadist–Saddamist conflict
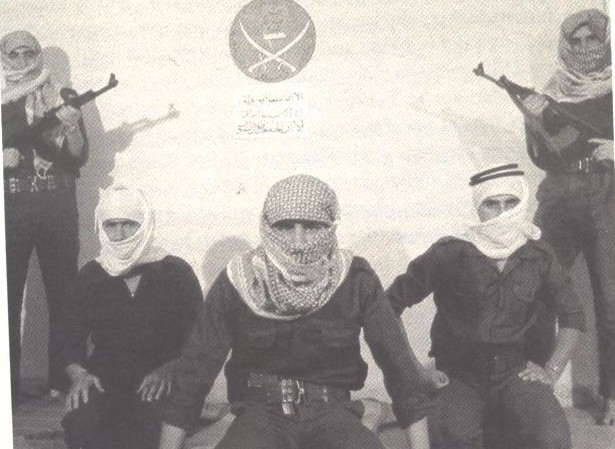
- Militants of the Fighting Vanguard (a breakaway faction of the Muslim Brotherhood) in Syria, 1979.
Date	31 May 1976 – 28 February 1982 (5 years, 8 months and 28 days)
Location	Damascus, Hama, Aleppo, Palmyra, and Jisr ash-Shughur, Syria
Result	Syrian government victory: Uprising suppressed; Muslim Brotherhood outlawed

Belligerents
Fighting Vanguard; Muslim Brotherhood (after mid-1979); Pro-Iraqi Ba'athists; Supported by: Iraq (1980–1982); Jordan; West Germany	Syria; Supported by: Soviet Union

Commanders and leaders
Marwan Hadid (Founder of the Fighting Vanguard) (executed); ʽAdnan ʽUqla (Commander of the Fighting Vanguard) (MIA); Sa`id Hawwa; Adnan Saad al-Din (surrendered); Ali al-Bayanouni (surrendered); Abd al-Fattah Abu Ghudda (surrendered)	Hafez al-Assad (President of Syria, Commander-in-Chief); Mustafa Tlass (Minister of Defence); Hikmat al-Shihabi (Chief of Staff of the Syrian military); Rifaat al-Assad (Commander of the Defense Companies); Shafiq Fayadh (Commander of the 3rd Armoured Division); Ali Haydar (Commander of special forces); Ali Duba (Director of Military Intelligence); Muhammad al-Khuli (Director of Air Intelligence)

The Islamist uprising in Syria comprised a series of protests, assassinations, bombings, and armed revolts led by Sunni Islamists, mainly members of the Fighting Vanguard and, after 1979, the Muslim Brotherhood, from 1976 until 1982. The uprising aimed to establish an Islamic republic in Syria by overthrowing the neo-Ba'athist government, in what was described by the Ba'ath Party as a "long campaign of terror".

After 1980, the popular resistance to Ba'athist rule expanded, with a coalition of Islamist opposition groups coordinating nation-wide strikes, protests and revolts throughout Syria. During the violent events, resistance militias attacked Syrian Arab Army bases and carried out political assassinations of Ba'ath party cadres, army officials, Soviet military advisors, and bureaucrats linked to Assad family. Civilians were also killed in retaliatory strikes conducted by security forces. The uprising reached its climax in the 1982 Hama massacre, during which the Ba'athist Syrian regime killed between 25,000 and 40,000 civilians.

== Background ==
=== 1963 Coup and 1964 Hama Riots ===
In context, the insurgency traces its origins to multiple factors. Historical ideological friction is a result of the Ba'ath Party's ultra-secularist foundation versus the Muslim Brotherhood's religious foundation. Muslim Brotherhood believed that Islamic religion had the central role in directing the laws of the state. On the other hand, secular Ba'athist ideology emphasized Arab nationalism and advocated the replacement of religion with socialism.

This friction became heated following the 1963 Ba'ath Party coup which saw the Party claiming sole power in the country and subsequently outlawing all other organised opposition. In response, the Muslim Brotherhood encouraged general protests across the country. These protests were most acute in the city of Hama, long considered "a stronghold of landed conservatism". During the 1964 Hama uprising, Ba'ath Party responded violently, crushing the revolt with brutal force.

Muslim Brotherhood was forced to continue its activities clandestinely. In the party, the ideological dispute began widening towards a sectarian one; as dominance of Alawite elites in the Ba'athist military, bureaucracy and politics became visible after the Old Guard was overthrown by the neo-Ba'athist military wing of Alawite General Salah Jadid in the 1966 coup. The Syrian Muslim Brotherhood fractured over disputes of the best course of action. Much of the party leadership was afraid to directly oppose the Syrian government, fearing that a violent confrontation could cause more harm than good. In contrast, several of the most radical members of the party split off to form the "Fighting Vanguard", led by Marwan Hadid. The Fighting Vanguard was willing to challenge the government by conducting assassinations and sabotage actions.

=== 1970 Coup and 1973 Constitutional Amendment ===
On 13 November 1970, Hafez Al Assad launched a coup which saw him gain sole power. To cement his power, on 31 January 1973, Assad implemented a new constitution which led to a national crisis. Unlike previous constitutions, this one did not require that the president of Syria must be a Muslim, leading to fierce demonstrations in Hama, Homs and Aleppo organized by the Muslim Brotherhood and the ulama. They labelled Assad as the "enemy of Allah" and called for a jihad against his rule. Under pressure, Assad returned the requirement and convinced Lebanese cleric Musa al-Sadr to issue a fatwa proclaiming the Alawite minority to be part of Shia Islam. The 1973 constitution greatly increased the support for Hadid's Fighting Vanguard, and many Muslim Brotherhood members defected to his faction or at least began to support it. He subsequently reorganized his group to increase the number of attacks, hoping to provoke the Syrian government into a crackdown that would force the Muslim Brotherhood into open rebellion.

Robert D. Kaplan has compared Assad's coming to power to

"an untouchable becoming maharajah in India or a Jew becoming tsar in Russia—an unprecedented development shocking to the Sunni majority population which had monopolized power for so many centuries."

=== Economic downturn ===
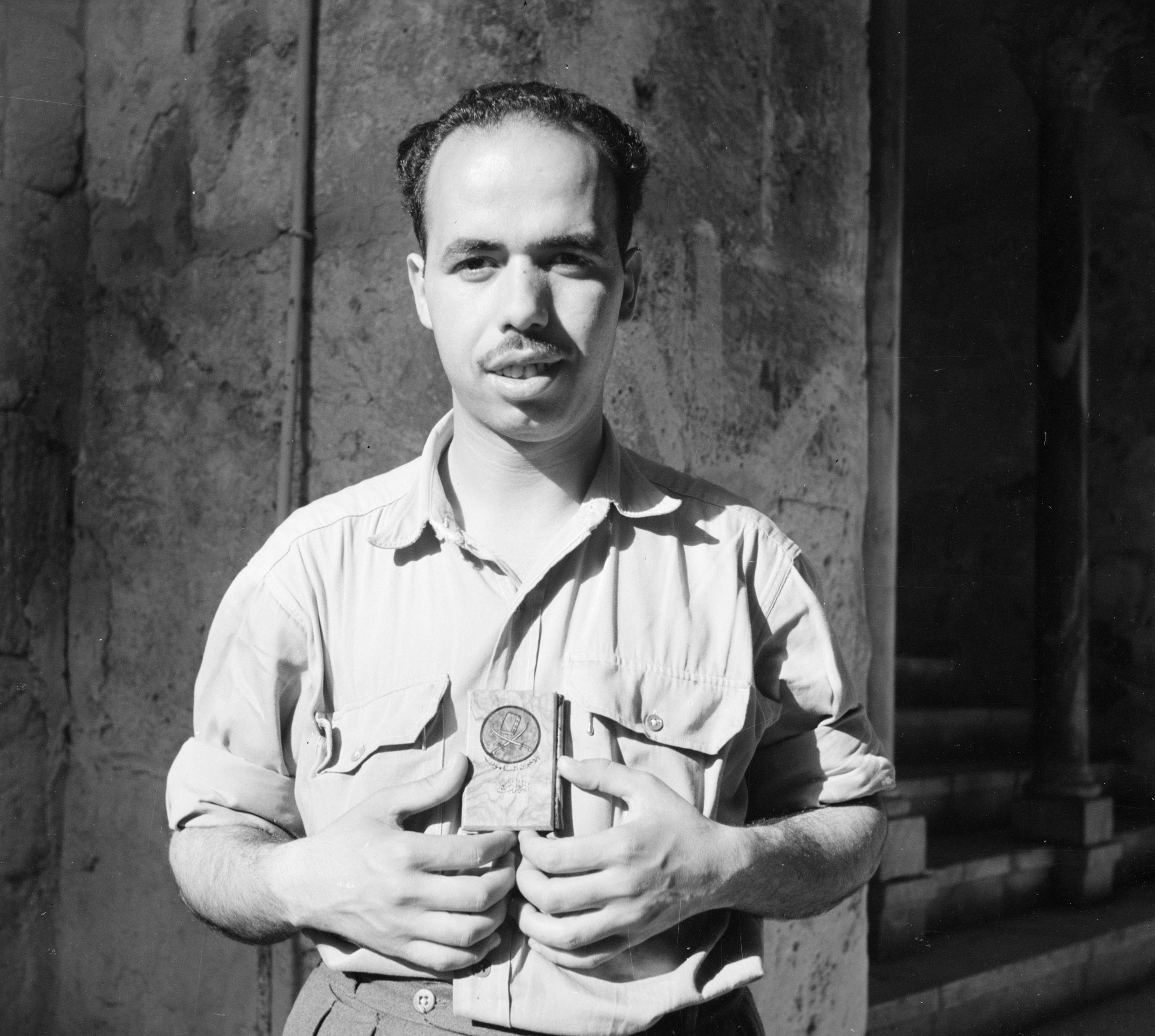
A Syrian holds a Muslim Brotherhood symbol, Aleppo, 1950.

According to historian Patrick Seale, the "economic boom following the October War had run out of steam, and new inequalities were created". Raphael Lefevre adds that the emergence of secular ideology had led to the "overturning of traditional structures of political and socioeconomic power". Additionally, a decrease in Gulf countries' economic support, the cost of Syria's military campaign in Lebanon, and the take-in of several refugees from the conflict all further exacerbated Syria's economic livelihood.

Economic impact of state socialism adopted by the Ba'athist government as well as rising assertiveness of Alawites in the new socio-political system resulted in the alienation of the traditional elites, landowners, industrialists and the bourgeoisie. Their support shifted in favour of the Islamic opposition which positioned itself as ideological defenders of private property and free trade.

== Insurgency ==
=== Clandestine terrorist operations (1976–1979) ===
1976 marked the Syrian army's intervention in the Lebanese Civil War, initially against the Palestinian guerrillas (PLO). This was received with surprise across the Arab world and contributed to pre-existing reasons for discontent with the Syrian government. Historian Patrick Seale described this attack as "slaughtering Arabism's sacred cow".

In the same year, Syria experienced sporadic terror attacks, mostly explosions and assassinations. The killings were largely aimed at prominent military officers, bureaucrats and government officials, including doctors and teachers. Most of the victims were Alawites, which led some to suggest "that the assassins had targeted the community" but "no one could be sure who was behind" the killings.

The Iraqi government of Saddam Hussein had supported the insurgents with a steady flow of arms and supplies. General Rifa'at al-Assad, younger brother of Hafez al-Assad, became a powerful figure in the Ba'ath party and Syrian politics, as a result of his activities in the Lebanese Civil War. Rifa'at's corruption as well as the sectarian excesses of his increasingly autonomous Alawite loyalist private militias provoked widespread resentment across the Syrian population. As a result, the internal situation in Syria became further destabilized and protests spread further across the cities.

=== Large-scale campaign (June 1979 – January 1982) ===
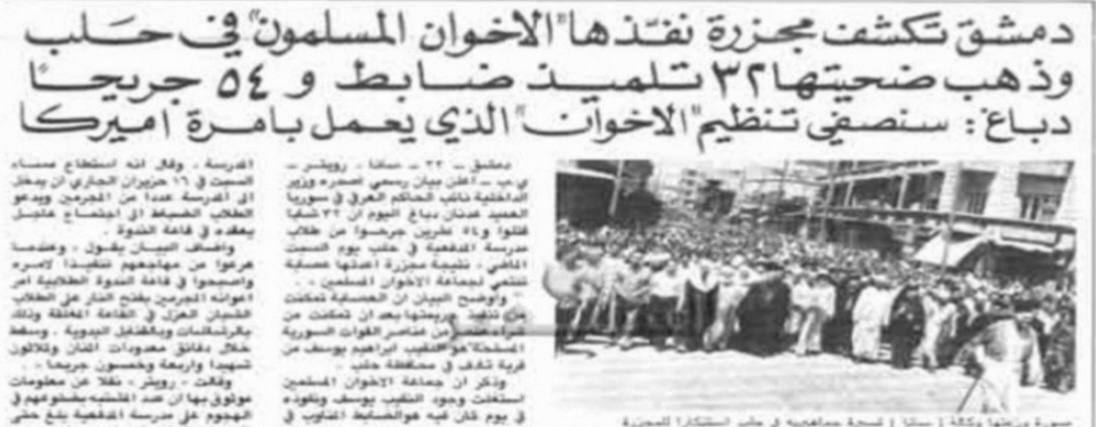
Newspaper reports on massacre in Aleppo Artillery School, 1979

16 June 1979 marked the day of the Aleppo artillery school massacre. Member of school staff, Captain Ibrahim Yusuf, called cadets to an urgent meeting at the dining hall. Once assembled, gunmen fired indiscriminately at the cadets with automatic weapons and grenades. The massacre was masterminded by 'Adnan 'Uqla, a Fighting Vanguard commander. 'Uqla committed the mass murder without the permission of the Fighting Vanguard's formal leader, Hisham Jumbaz, or its field commando in Aleppo.

This massacre signalled a turn in the insurgency as it was now more than just a series of sporadic attacks, but a campaign of "large-scale urban warfare". By August, the Brotherhood had declared a jihad against the Syrian government, effectively claiming responsibility for the insurgency.

In the days leading up to 8 March 1980 (the 17th anniversary of the 1963 Ba'athist coup), nearly all Syrian cities were paralysed by strikes and protests, which sometimes developed into pitched battles with security forces. The events escalated into a widescale crackdown in Aleppo, where the government responded with overwhelming military force, sending in tens of thousands of troops, supported by tanks and helicopters. In and around Aleppo, hundreds of demonstrators were killed, and eight thousand were arrested. By April, the uprising in the area had been crushed.

Between 1979 and 1981, Brotherhood insurgents continued to target Ba'ath party officials, party offices, police stations, military vehicles, barracks, factories, and even Russian officials. Insurgents would form 'hit teams' to kill Ba'ath party members in their sleep, such as 'Abd al 'Aziz al 'Adi, who was murdered in front of his wife and children and had his body thrown into the street. On occasion, individuals who had denounced the killings were also targeted, including Sheikh al-Shami, Imam of the Suleymania mosque of Aleppo.

Other instances of terrorism include attacks in August, September and November 1981, where the Brotherhood carried out three car-bomb attacks against government and military targets in Damascus, killing hundreds of people, according to the official press. Among the victims were Soviet officials, experts, and their families serving with the United Nations as part of the United Nations Disengagement Observer Force.

=== Government response (1979–1981) ===
Losing control over the streets, the government decided on a policy of all-out-war on the insurgents after a Ba'ath party congress concluded in January 1980. The Party's first step was to arm Party loyalists and sympathizers, effectively creating a 'citizen militia'. By March and April, the cities of Jisr al-Shughur and Aleppo were brought into line with thousands of troops in garrison and tanks on the streets. Hundreds were rounded up in search-and-destroy operations.

In another case, in retaliation to a failed terror attack on an Alawite village near Hama, the army executed about 400 of Hama's Sunni inhabitants, chosen randomly among the male population of over the age of 14.

On 27 June 1980, Hafez Al Assad himself narrowly escaped death after a failed assassination attempt. The assailant fired a burst of rounds and threw two grenades, the first being kicked away by Assad and the second being covered by his personal bodyguard, Khalid al-Husayn, who died instantly. In retaliation, the very next day, Rifaat Al Assad's defence company flew into the infamous Tadmor prison in helicopters and killed hundreds of prisoners who had been Brotherhood-affiliates. By 8 July, membership of the Muslim Brotherhood became a capital offence altogether, with a month-long grace period for those who wished to turn themselves in and avoid a death sentence. Some couple thousand individuals turned themselves in, hoping to escape the death penalty; mostly urban, educated, young men.

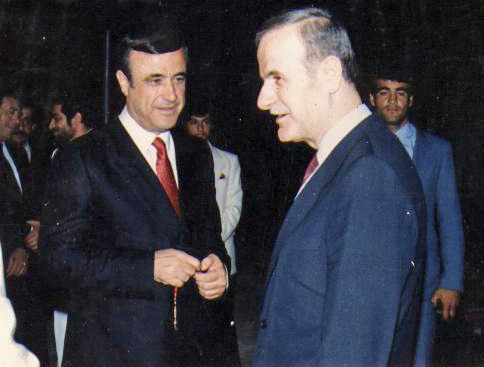
Rifaat Al Assad (Left) next to his brother Hafez Al Assad (Right). Rifaat Al Assad commanded the military divisions that entered Hama to crush the insurgency.

=== Hama massacre and end (February 1982) ===
The insurgency is generally considered to have been crushed by the bloody Hama massacre of 1982, in which thousands of insurgents, soldiers and residents were killed, with the vast majority of the victims being innocent civilians. On 2 February 1982, the Brotherhood led a major insurrection in Hama, rapidly taking control of the city. Ba'athist Syrian military forces responded by bombing Hama (whose population was about 250,000) throughout the rest of the month, destroying nearly 70% of Hama city and killing between 25,000 and 40,000 people. The Hama events marked the defeat of the Brotherhood as a political force in Syria.

US Intelligence conducted an intelligence analysis with regards to possible outcomes of the conflict.

== Aftermath ==
Having suppressed all opposition, Hafez al-Assad released some imprisoned members of the Brotherhood in the mid-1990s.

In a January 2006 interview, the Brotherhood's leader, Ali Sadreddine Bayanouni, "said the Muslim Brotherhood wants a peaceful change of government in Damascus and the establishment of a 'civil, democratic state', not an Islamic republic." According to Bayanouni, the Syrian government admits having detained 30,000 people, giving a fair representation of the Brotherhood's strength.

The Muslim Brotherhood would have no physical presence in Syria again until 2011 which played in the role in the Syrian revolution against the Ba'athist government of Bashar al-Assad, who succeeded his father after his death in 2000. The Syrian revolution would eventually be achieved as rebel offensives had swept the country in December 2024 which culminated with the collapse of the Assad regime over Syria, with rebel leaders saying in regards to the Hama massacre of 1982 that they have came "to cleanse the wound that has persisted in Syria for 40 years".

== List of assassinations during the uprising ==
=== Individuals assassinated between 1976 and 1979 ===
- the commander of the Hama garrison, Colonel Ali Haydar, killed in October 1976
- the rector of Damascus University, Muhammad al-Fadl, killed in February 1977
- the commander of the missile corps, Brigadier 'Abd al Hamid Ruzzug, killed in June 1977
- the doyen of Syrian dentists, Ibrahim Na'ama, killed in March 1978
- the director of police affairs at the Ministry of the Interior, Colonel Ahmad Khalil, killed in August 1978
- Public Prosecutor 'Adil Mini of the Supreme State Security Court, killed in April 1979.
- President Hafez al-Assad's own doctor, the neurologist Muhammad Shahada Khalil, who was killed in August 1979.

=== Individuals assassinated between 1980 and 1982 ===
- Salim al-Lawzi, publisher of al-Hawadith, in Lebanon killed by Syrian assassins in March 1980.
- Riad Taha, head of the journalists' union in Beirut killed in July 1980.
- Banan al-Tantawi, wife of the former general director of Muslim Brothers Issam al-Attar, killed in Aachen in July 1980.
- Salah al-Din Bitar, co-founder of the Ba'ath Party, killed in Paris on 21 July 1980.

While the involvement of the Syrian government "was not proved" in these killings, it "was widely suspected."

== See also ==
- Hama Massacre
- History of the Muslim Brotherhood in Syria
- Human rights in Syria
- List of modern conflicts in the Middle East
- Syrian civil war
- Terrorism in Syria
