= Riad Taha =

Lebanese journalist (1927–1980)

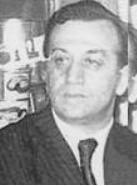
- Born: 1927; Hermel, Greater Lebanon
- Died: 23 July 1980 (aged 52–53); Beirut, Lebanon
- Occupations: Journalist and editor
- Years active: 1945–1980

Riad Taha (Arabic: رياض طه) (1927 – 23 July 1980) was a Lebanese Shiite journalist and president of the Lebanese Publishers Association (Arabic: نقابة الصحافة اللبنانية). He was assassinated when gunmen opened fire on his car. Perpetrators were never caught, but it was widely suspected that the assassination was ordered by the Syrian Intelligence. He was the head of the Lebanese Publishers Association from 1967 until his murder.

== Early life ==
Taha was born into a Shiite family in Hermel, Lebanon, in 1927.

== Career ==
Taha started as a journalist in the magazine At Talaeh (Arabic: الطلائع) in 1945 when he was 18. He also worked in the newspaper An Nidal wad Dunia (Arabic: النضال والدنيا). In 1947, aged 20, he established the weekly Akhbar al 'Aalam (Arabic: أخبار العالم) (meaning the News of the World) and was in Palestine in 1948 to cover the war there. In 1949, he established in Lebanon the Orient News Agency (Arabic: وكالة أنباء الشرق), one of the first ever privately owned Arab news agencies.

In 1950, he started the publication Al Ahad magazine (Arabic: الأحد) (literally The Sunday). He was also editor of the magazine which opposed the Baghdad Pact. Taha became an advocate of the Egyptian President Gamal Abdel Nasser during this period. In 1953, he launched the newspaper Al Bilad (Arabic: البلاد) (meaning The Country).

In 1955, he founded the newspaper Al Kifah (Arabic: الكفاح) (literally The Struggle) and his own publishing house called Dar al Kifah (Arabic: دار الكفاح) that consolidated all his publishing activities. His also authored books including:

- 1950: Shafataan Bakheelataan (Arabic: شفتان بخيلتان)
- 1958: Fi Tareeq al Kifah (Arabic: في طريق الكفاح)
- 1963: Filisteen al Yawm, La Ghadan (Arabic: فلسطين اليوم، لا غداً)
- 1973: Al I'laam wal Ma'raka (Arabic: الإعلام والمعركة)
- 1974: Qissat al Wahda wal Infisal (Arabic: قصة الوحدة والإنفصال)

He was elected head of the Lebanese Publishers Association, a post he would hold continuously until his assassination in 1980.

== Assassination ==
Taha was killed in Beirut in July 1980. Although there have been rumors that Syrian intelligence killed him, there is also another report, stating that Taha was killed due to the feud between his family and another Shiite family.

== See also ==
- List of assassinated Lebanese people
