= 1981 Hama massacre =

April 1981 massacre in Hama, Syria

- Part of Islamist uprising in Syria
- Location: Hama, Ba'athist Syria
- Date: April 1981
- Target: Hama Residents
- Attack type: Massacre
- Deaths: 350–400
- Injuries: 600
- Perpetrators: Defense Companies; 14th Special Forces Division; 47th Brigade

The 1981 Hama massacre was an incident in which over 300 residents of Hama were killed by Ba'athist Syrian military forces.

== Background ==
From 1976 to 1982, Islamists, including the Muslim Brotherhood, fought the Ba'ath Party-controlled government of Syria in what has been called a "long campaign of terror". In July 1980, the ratification of Law No. 49 made membership in the Muslim Brotherhood a capital offense. Middle East Watch (part of Human Rights Watch) called the period between 1976 and 1982 "The Great Repression." According to Middle East Watch,

Opposition exploded in the late 1970s, touched off by Assad's military intervention in Lebanon in 1976. Public discontent fed on many grievances, rampant inflation, a housing crisis deepened by refugees from Lebanon, official corruption, security forces from which no one felt safe, and the domination of the Alawites within the military and political system. Over four years unrest spread to every sector of Syrian society, and by the beginning of 1980 it seemed possible the regime would be overthrown.

Journalist Robert Fisk who was reporting from Hama in 1981 states:

"When I spent a night in the autumn of 1981 in the town’s only hotel.. A visit to the homes of three very frightened foreign aid workers – two Australians and an Indian – confirmed a popular rumour in Damascus: that Hama was in a state of near-revolt against Assad’s Baathist regime."

== The massacre ==
The 1981 Hama massacre occurred after a failed attack around 21–22 April 1981 by armed Sunni Islamist guerrillas (reports identify a security checkpoint or a spring festival) near an Alawite village near Hama. As a revenge action, government units deployed into Hama and launched house-to-house searches, sealing off neighborhoods as street fighting erupted. A curfew was imposed and Syrian Army troops entered the city. Between Thursday 23rd and Sunday 26th of April, 1981, security forces killed scores to hundreds of residents - between 150 and "several hundred", according to The Washington Post, or at least 350, plus 600 injured, according to authors Olivier Carré and Gérard Michaud chosen randomly among the male population over the age of 14. The killings were carried out by the government's "Protection Brigades" (a palace guard commanded by the president's brother Rifaat al-Assad, and Syrian Special Forces commanded by General Ali Haidar, an Alawite and Assad aide, according to the Post, while Human Rights Watch identified Syrian Special Forces and the Syrian Army's 47th Brigade.

The Washington Post described the incident as "believed to have been the bloodiest retribution so far in President Hafez al-Assad's two-year crackdown on opponents to his rule". Syrian Mukhabarat and Alawite militias loyal to Rifaat al-Assad unleashed brutal attacks on the civilians of Hama; executing and torturing family members of those accused of collaborating with the Islamist opposition.

== See also ==
- 2004 Qamishli riots
- Black September
- List of massacres in Syria
- List of modern conflicts in the Middle East
