= 1982 Hama massacre =

Anti-Sunni massacre in Hama, Syria

Coordinates: 35°08′N 36°45′E

Hama massacre
- Part of the Islamist uprising in Syria
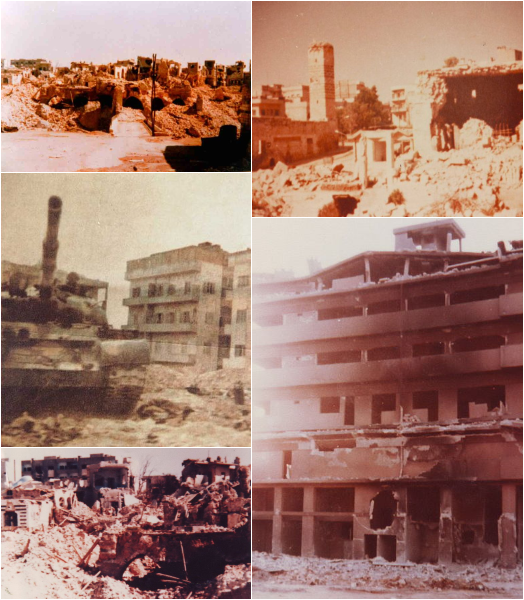
- Location: (Ba'athist Syria) Hama, Syria
- Date: 2 February 1982 – 28 February 1982; 44 years ago
- Attack type: Sectarian violence
- Deaths: 25,000–40,000 civilians killed (Note: Sources:); 15,000–17,000 civilians forcibly disappeared
- Victim: 100,000 civilians arbitrarily detained
- Perpetrators: Syrian Armed Forces; Syrian Army; Military Intelligence; Special Forces; Syrian Air Force; Air Force Intelligence; Defense Companies; Struggle Companies; Ministry of Interior; General Intelligence; Syrian Police
- Defender: Muslim Brotherhood: Fighting Vanguard
- Motive: Anti-Sunni sentiment, Assadism, counterinsurgency

The Hama massacre (Arabic: مجزرة حماة) occurred in February 1982 when the Syrian Arab Army and the Defense Companies paramilitary force, under the orders of President Hafez al-Assad, besieged the town of Hama for 27 days in order to quell an uprising by the Fighting Vanguard of the Muslim Brotherhood against the Ba'athist government. The campaign that had begun in 1976 by Sunni Islamist groups, including the Muslim Brotherhood, was brutally crushed in an anti-Sunni massacre at Hama, carried out by the Syrian Arab Army and Alawite militias under the command of Major General Rifaat al-Assad.

Prior to the start of operations, Hafez al-Assad issued orders to seal off Hama from the outside world; effectively imposing a media blackout, total shut down of communications, electricity and food supplies to the city for months. Initial diplomatic dispatches released in Western media outlets assessed that 1,000 people were killed. Subsequent estimates vary, with the lower ones reporting that at least 10,000 people were killed and more than 20,000 civilians were forcibly disappeared, while other estimates put the number of deaths at 40,000. The massacre remains the "single deadliest act" of violence perpetrated by an Arab state upon its own population in the modern history of the Middle East. Some suspect the Hafez al-Assad regime of using chemical weapons in the city.

Nearly two-thirds of the city was destroyed in the Ba'athist military operation. Robert Fisk, who was present at Hama during the events of the massacre, reported that indiscriminate bombing had razed much of the city to the ground and that the vast majority of the victims were civilians. Fisk later wrote in 2010 that at least 20,000 civilians were killed by Rifaat al-Assad's paramilitary companies in the "streets and underground tunnels of Hama". Patrick Seale, reporting in The Globe and Mail, described the operation as a "two-week orgy of killing, destruction and looting" which destroyed the city and killed a minimum of 25,000 inhabitants.

The attack has been described as being motivated by sectarian animosities against the Sunni community of Hama. (Note: Sources:) Memory of the massacre remains an important aspect of Syrian culture and as a result, it evokes strong emotions amongst Syrians to the present day. The Hama massacre was invoked by Syrian opposition leaders when Ba'athist government forces were driven out of the city following successful rebel offensives in December 2024 that ultimately ended the rule of the Assad family in Syria, with rebel leaders saying they have "come to cleanse the wound that has persisted in Syria for 40 years".

== Background ==
The Ba'ath Party of Syria, which advocates Ba'athism, the ideologies of Arab nationalism and Arab socialism, had clashed with the Muslim Brotherhood, a group which advocates a Sunni Islamist ideology, since 1940. The two groups were opposed in fundamental ways. The Ba'ath party was nominally secular and nationalist. The Muslim Brotherhood, like other Islamist groups, saw nationalism as un-Islamic and religion as inseparable from politics and government. Most Ba'ath party members were from humble, obscure backgrounds and favored radical economic policies, while Sunni Muslims had dominated the souqs and landed power of Syria, and tended to view government intervention in the economy as threatening their interests. Not all Sunni notables believed in fundamentalism, but even those who did not often saw the Brotherhood as a useful tool against the Ba'ath.

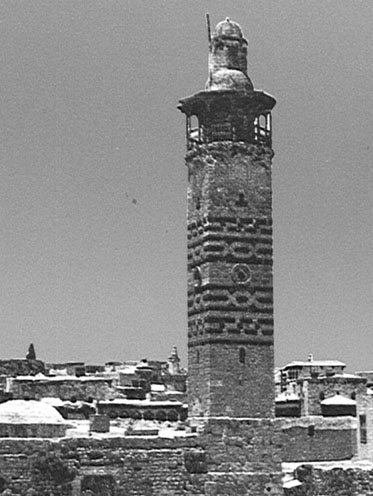
Section of Hama before the government attack, showing the Nur al-Din Mosque in the foreground

The town of Hama in particular was a "stronghold of Islamic conservatism and of the Muslim Brotherhood," and "had long been a redoubtable opponent of the Ba'athist state." The first full-scale clash between the two occurred shortly after the 1963 coup, in which the Ba'ath party first gained power in Syria. In April 1964, riots broke out in Hama, where Muslim insurgents put up "roadblocks, stockpiled food and weapons, ransacked wine shops." After an Ismaili Ba'ath militiaman was killed, riots intensified and rebels attacked "every vestige" of the Ba'ath party in Hama. Tanks were brought in to crush the rebellion and 70 members of the Muslim Brotherhood died, with many others wounded or captured, and still more disappearing underground.

After the clashes in Hama, the situation periodically erupted into clashes between the government and various Islamic sects. However, a more serious challenge occurred after the Syrian invasion of Lebanon in 1976. In October 1980, Muhammad al-Bayanuni, a respected member of the religious hierarchy of Aleppo, became the Islamic Front's Secretary-General, but its leading light remained 'Adnan Sa'd al-Din, the General Supervisor of the Muslim Brothers. The chief ideologue of the Islamic Front was a prominent religious scholar from Hama, Sa'id Hawwa, who along with Sa'd al-Din had been a leader of the northern militants during the mid-1970s. Anti-regime activists such as Marwan Hadid and Muhammad al-Hamid were also carefully listened to.

From 1976 to 1982, Sunni Islamists fought the Ba'ath Party-controlled government of Syria in what has been called a "long campaign of terror". In 1979, the Brotherhood undertook guerrilla activities in multiple cities within the country targeting military officers and government officials. The resulting government repression included abusive tactics, torture, mass arrests, and a number of selective assassinations, particularly of prominent mosque preachers. In July 1980, the ratification of Law No. 49 made membership in the Muslim Brotherhood a capital offence.

Throughout the first years of the 1980s, the Muslim Brotherhood and various other Islamist factions staged hit-and-run and bomb attacks against the government and its officials, including a nearly successful attempt to assassinate President Hafez al-Assad on 26 June 1980, during an official state reception for the President of Mali. When a machine-gun salvo missed him, al-Assad allegedly ran to kick a hand grenade aside, and his bodyguard (who survived and was later promoted to a much higher position) smothered the explosion of another one. Surviving with only light injuries, al-Assad's revenge was swift and merciless: only hours later, a large number of imprisoned Islamists (reports say from 600 to 1,000 prisoners) were executed in their cells in Tadmor Prison (near Palmyra) by units loyal to the President's brother, Rifaat al-Assad.

In April 1981, security forces killed 300 people in reprisal after several Alawites were killed in villages near Hama.

== Attack by insurgents in Hama ==
The events of the Hama massacre began at 2 am on 2 February 1982. An army unit searching the old city stumbled on the hideout of the local guerilla commander, Omar Jawwad (aka Abu Bakr), and was ambushed. Other insurgent cells were alerted by radio and "roof-top snipers killed perhaps a score" of Syrian soldiers. Reinforcements were rushed in to besiege Abu Bakr who then "gave the order for a general uprising" in Hama. Mosque loudspeakers used for the call to prayer called for jihad against the Ba'ath, and hundreds of Islamic insurgents rose to attack the homes of government officials and Baath Party leaders, overrun police posts and ransack armouries. They carried out attacks, especially in the northern cities, on government buildings, cooperative stores, police stations, and army units, and provoked demonstrations and large-scale shutdowns of shops and schools. The Brotherhood, having already benefited from training provided to Muslim militants in Iraqi Army camps, was also assured of comprehensive assistance from Iraq in the form of weaponry and financial resources. By daybreak of the morning of 2 February, some 70 leading Ba'athists had been killed and the Islamist insurgents and other opposition activists proclaimed Hama a "liberated city", urging Syrians to rise up against the "infidel".

== Counter-attack by government forces ==
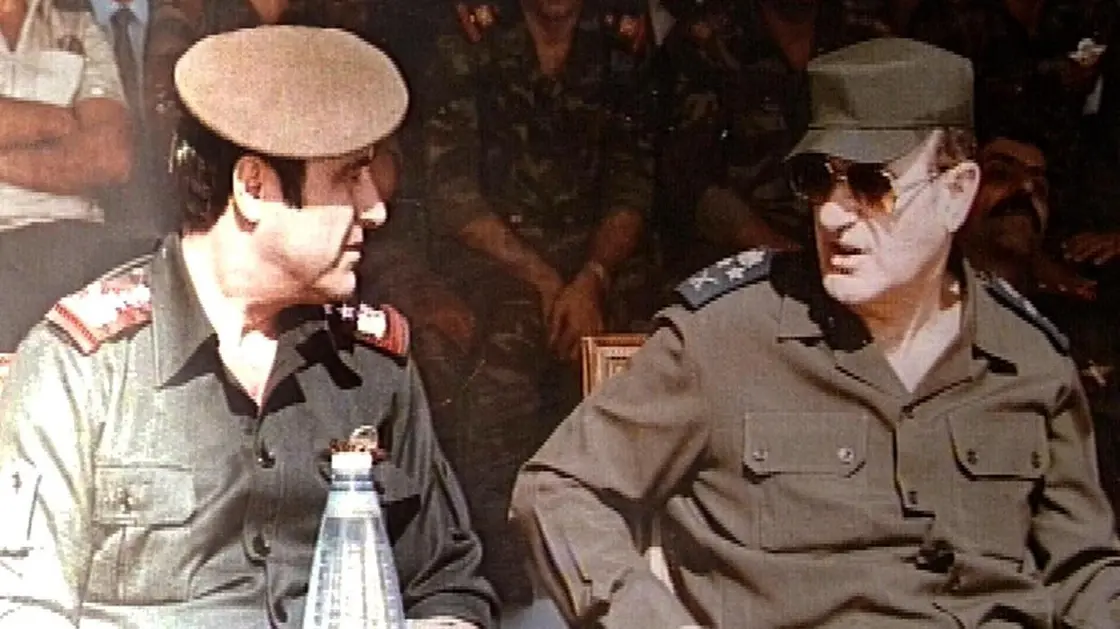
Under the orders of President Hafez al-Assad (right), his brother, Major General Rifaat al-Assad (left), supervised the ground operations of the massacre, using Alawite paramilitaries under his command. Weeks after the massacre, Rifaat was promoted to being the Vice President of Syria

According to author Patrick Seale, "every party worker, every paratrooper sent to Hama knew that this time Islamic militancy had to be torn out of the city, whatever the cost". The military was mobilized, and President Hafez al-Assad sent Rifaat's special forces (the Defense Companies), elite army units and Mukhabarat agents to the city. Before the attack, the Syrian government called for the city's surrender and warned that anyone remaining in the city would be considered a rebel. Hama was besieged by 12,000 troops for three weeks – the first week spent "in regaining control of the town", and the last two "in hunting down the insurgents". Robert Fisk, a journalist who was in Hama midway through the battle, described civilians fleeing pervasive destruction.

According to Amnesty International, the Syrian military bombed the old city center from the air to facilitate the entry of infantry and tanks through the narrow streets; buildings were demolished by tanks during the first four days of fighting. Large parts of the old city were destroyed. There were also unsubstantiated reports of use of hydrogen cyanide by the government forces.

Rifaat's forces ringed the city with artillery, shelled it, then combed the rubble for surviving Muslim Brotherhood members and supporters. Suspecting that rebels were still hiding in tunnels under the old city, he had diesel fuel pumped into them and stationed tanks at their entrances to shell fleeing militants. Alawite military units loyal to Rifaat al-Assad, such as the Defense Companies, entered the city and indiscriminately massacred thousands of Sunni civilian survivors.

The indiscriminate bombardment by government forces razed much of the city's districts, streets, heritage sites, mosques and churches. The Azm Palace was severely damaged. Baathist paramilitaries continued looting for weeks and numerous families were rounded up and shot. Baathist dissident Akram al-Hawrani asserted that women, children and all Hama inhabitants irrespective of their political leanings were targeted indiscriminately during the regime onslaught. Even Ba'ath Party members, according to Hawrani, were victims of the "savage slaughter" ordered by Hafez al-Assad.

== Estimates of fatalities ==
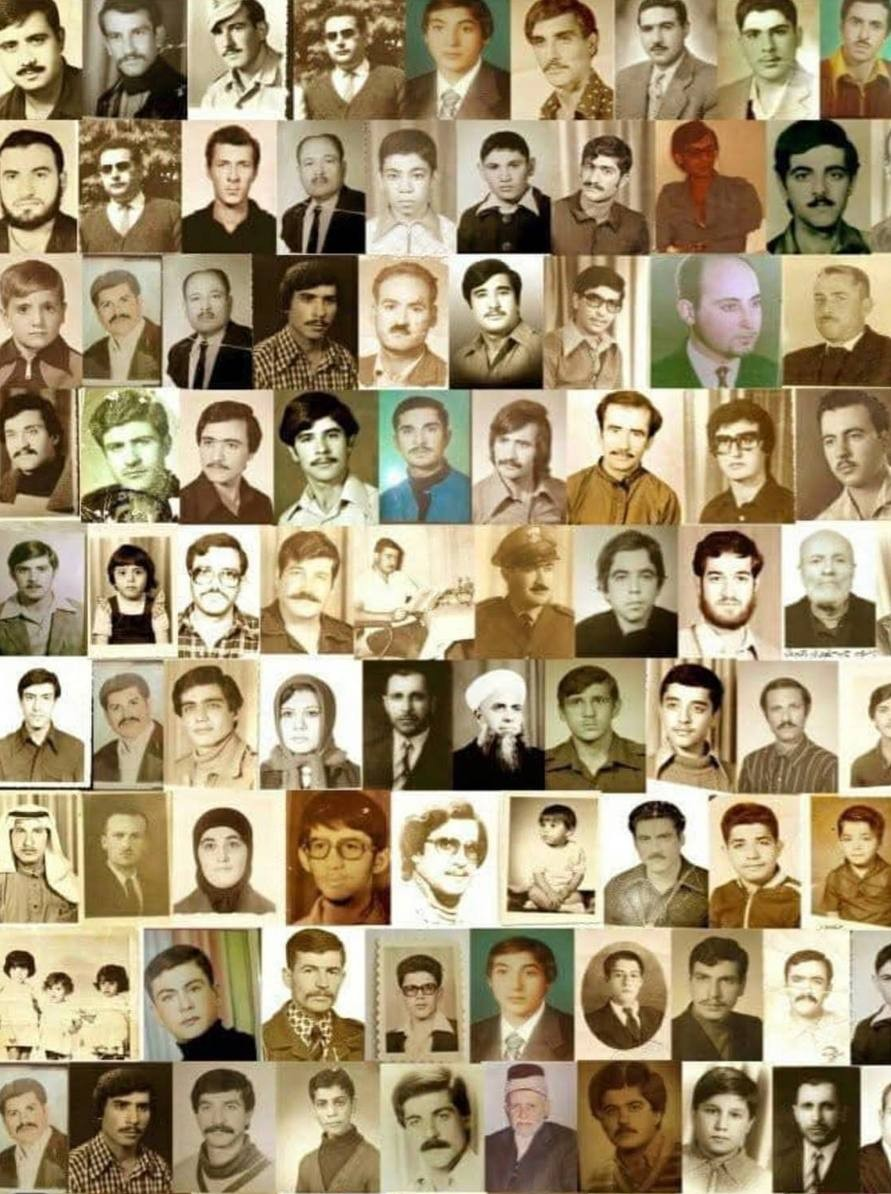
Portraits of Hama massacre victims

Initial diplomatic reports from western governments in 1982 had stated that 1,000 were killed in the fighting. Subsequent estimates of casualties varied from 5,000 to 40,000 people killed, including about 1,000 soldiers. Robert Fisk, who was in Hama shortly after the massacre, originally estimated fatalities at 10,000, but has since doubled the estimate to 20,000. Major General Rifaat al-Assad, the brother of President al-Assad, reportedly boasted of killing 38,000 people. Amnesty International initially estimated the death toll was between 10,000 and 25,000. According to a Human Rights Watch report published in 1990, the massacre saw the deaths of between five and ten thousand people. Reports by Syrian Human Rights Committee claimed "over 25,000" or between 30,000 and 40,000 people were killed.

Twenty years later, Syrian journalist Subhi Hadidi, wrote that forces "under the command of General Ali Haydar, besieged the city for 27 days, bombarding it with heavy artillery and tank [fire], before invading it and killing 30,000 or 40,000 of the city's citizens – in addition to the 15,000 missing who have not been found to this day, and the 100,000 expelled." A report published by the Syrian Network for Human Rights (SNHR) on the 40th anniversary of the Hama massacre estimates that around 40,000 inhabitants were killed in the massacre; in addition to about 17,000 civilians who were disappeared and have not been found as of the present day.

== Aftermath ==
Around two-thirds of the city was demolished in the military operations during the massacre. After the Hama massacre, the Islamic revolution was crushed, and since then, the Brotherhood has operated in exile and other opposition factions either surrendered or slipped into hiding. Government attitudes in Syria hardened considerably during the uprising, and President Assad would rely more on repression than conventional political tactics during the remainder of his rule, although an economic liberalization program was launched in the 1990s. After the massacre, the already evident disarray in the insurgents' ranks increased, and the rebel factions experienced acrimonious internal splits. Particularly damaging to their cause was the deterrent effect of the massacre, as well as the realization that no Sunni uprisings had occurred in the rest of the country in support of the Hama rebels. Most of the members of the rebel groups either fled from the country or remained in exile, mainly in Iran, while others made their way to the United States, the United Kingdom and Germany. The Muslim Brotherhood—the largest opposition group—split into two factions, after giving up on armed struggle. One faction, more moderate than the other faction and recognized by the international Muslim Brotherhood, eventually headquartered itself in the UK, where it remains today, while the less moderate faction headquartered itself in Iran and retained a military structure for several years, with backing from the Iranian government, before it rejoined the London-based mainstream.

Internationally, the Hama massacre became a symbol of the al-Assad government's human rights violations and brutal repression. Within Syria, mention of the massacre was strictly suppressed by the Assad regime; however, the general contours of the events—and various partisan versions, on all sides—are well known throughout the country. When the massacre was publicly referenced, it was only referenced as the "events" or it was referenced as the "incident" at Hama. In 2012, Professor Gregory Stanton of Genocide Watch characterized the Hama massacre as a 'genocidal massacre', and he also stated that its methods could prompt the regime to pursue future mass killings during the Syrian civil war (which was just beginning at the time).

Memory of the Hama Massacre has become an important aspect of Syrian culture, and evokes a strong feeling of resentment among Syrians to this day. During the Syrian Revolution in 2011, older Syrians frequently warned younger activists about the Assad regime's determination to "do Hama again", i.e., its willingness to exterminate tens or even hundreds of thousands of civilians in order to ensure its survival. The satirical slogan "Asad 'alayya wa fil-hurubi na'amah (Against me a lion and in wars an ostrich...)" became popular amongst Syrian dissidents for Hafez al-Assad's comparatively muted response to the Israeli invasion of Lebanon the same year.

== Lawsuits ==
In December 2013, human rights organization "Trial International" filed a criminal lawsuit against Rifaat al-Assad over his role as commander of Defense Brigades that organized the ground campaign of the massacre. Charges in the war-crimes lawsuit included organizing extrajudicial killings, large-scale torture, sexual violence, mass-rapes, summary executions and forced disappearances.

A criminal investigation was launched by the Swiss Office of the Attorney General the same year. Almost a decade later in August 2023, the Federal Criminal Court ordered the extradition of Rifa'at al-Assad, prompting Switzerland to issue an arrest warrant to prosecute him.

== See also ==
- 2004 al-Qamishli riots
- 2025 massacres of Syrian Alawites
- Counterinsurgency
- History of Syria, Baath Party rule under Hafez al-Assad
- Human rights in Syria#Ba'athist era (1963–2024)
  - Human rights in Ba'athist Syria
- List of massacres in Syria
- List of modern conflicts in the Middle East
- Siege of Hama (2011)
- Siege of Homs

== Bibliography ==
- Benkorich, Nora; 16 Feb. 2012, Trente ans après, retour sur la tragédie de Hama
- Benjamin, Daniel; Steven Simon. 2002. The Age of Sacred Terror. Random House.
- Fisk, Robert. 1990. Pity the Nation. London: Touchstone, ISBN 0-671-74770-3.
- Fisk, Robert. 2007 February 10. Conspiracy of silence in the Arab world. The Independent (UK).
- Fisk, Robert. 2010 September 16. Robert Fisk: Freedom, democracy and human rights in Syria. (Ribal al-Assad gives our writer a rare insight into the dynasty that has shaped modern Syria). The Independent (UK).
- Friedman, Thomas. 1998. From Beirut to Jerusalem, London: HarperCollins Publishers, ISBN 0-00-653070-2. Chapter 4: "Hama Rules".
- Global Politician.com. 2006 May 23. The Syrian Muslim Brotherhood.
- "Hama". GlobalSecurity.org.
- Human Rights Watch. 1996. Syria's Tadmor Prison: Dissent Still Hostage to a Legacy of Terror.
- Houry, Nadim (16 July 2010). A Wasted Decade: Human Rights in Syria during Bashar al-Asad’s First Ten Years in Power (Report). Human Rights Watch.
- MEMRI (January 2002). "Bashar Assad Teaches Visiting Members of U.S. Congress How to Fight Terrorism". Middle East Media Research Institute.
- "Chaos in Syria and Jordan Alarms U.S." The New York Times. 26 March 2011.
- Seale, Patrick. 1989. Asad, the Struggle for the Middle East. University of California Press.
- Fisk, Robert. 1989. Pity the Nation. London: Touchstone, ISBN 0-671-74770-3.
- Syrian Human Rights Committee. 2006 Massacre of Hama (February 1982) Genocide and a crime against Humanity.
- Syrian Human Rights Committee. 2005 (Arabic) The Massacre of Hama: Law Enforcement Requires Accountability.
- United States of America. Department of State, Bureau of Public Affairs. Background note: Syria.
- Wright, Robin. 2008. Dreams and Shadows : the Future of the Middle East. Penguin.
