= Saʽid Ḥawwa =

Saʽid Hawwa
- سعيد حوى
- Born: 1935; Hama, Syria
- Died: 1989 (aged 53–54); Amman, Jordan
- Education: Damascus University
- Organization: Muslim Brotherhood of Syria

Saʽid Hawwa (Arabic: سعيد حوى, Saʽīd Ḥawwá) (1935–1989) was a prominent Syrian Hanafi scholar, a symbol of resistance to Hafez al-Assad and a leading member and prominent ideologue in the Muslim Brotherhood of Syria. Hawwa authored a large number of books that dealt with the proper organizational principles and structures for Islamist organizations, the proper spiritual and practical training for Muslim activists, and issues of interpretation, jurisprudence, and creed in Islam. As a high-ranking member of the Syrian Brotherhood, he was involved in the escalating unrest directed against the Ba`thist regime throughout the 1960s and 1970s and played a key role from exile in the latter part of the failed Islamist uprising in Syria of 1976–1982.

Hawwa was also an early prominent scholar known for his vocal opposition to Iran's Khomeinist movement. In his treatise "Khomeini, Deviation in Doctrines, Deviation in Positions", Hawwa denounced Khomeini's beliefs as heretical and attacked Khomeinist revolution as a project to expand Iranian influence in the Arab World. Hawwa's treatise made a huge impact amongst Sunnis in the Muslim World, who were becoming increasingly opposed to Iranian policies.

== Life and career ==
=== Early life in Hama ===
Hawwa was born in 1935 and grew up in the `Aliliyat (Arabic العليليات) quarter of the central Syrian city of Hama. According to Hawwa' autobiography, his father's family was descended from the al-Na`im tribe, which traced its lineage back to the Prophet Muhammad, while his mother's family belonged to the al-Muwali clan. Due to the death of his mother and the temporary forced exile of his father as the result of a feud, Hawwa was raised in his early years by his grandmother. Following the return of his father to Hama, Hawwa worked alongside him in his wholesale produce business.

Hawwa was affected by the tense political atmosphere in Hama in 1940s, largely the result of the activism of Akram al-Hawrani and his Arab Socialist Party. Hawwa's father was active in Hawrani's movement and engaged in organizing within the `Aliyliyat neighborhood against rich landowners in addition to participating in the final efforts to expel the French from Syria in 1945.

The importance of education and religion was impressed upon Hawwa by both his mother and his father. The formative figure in Hawwa's young spiritual and educational life was Shaykh Muhammad al-Hamid (Arabic محمد الحامد), who taught religious instruction at Hawwa's high school and delivered religious lectures and sermons in Hama's famous Sultan Mosque. Al-Hamid was a member of the Naqshabandi Sufi order and a proselytizer of the ideas of Muslim Brotherhood founder Hassan al-Banna, whom he had met during a stay in Egypt. Hawwa joined the Hama branch of the Syrian Muslim Brotherhood at the direction of al-Hamid in 1953 and participated in the group's attempts to organize the city's youth in opposition to the various leftist movements active in Syrian politics at that time.

=== Life in Damascus ===
Hawwa enrolled as a student in the Faculty of Islamic Law at the University of Damascus in 1955. As a student at that time, he had the opportunity to take instruction from Mustafa al-Siba'i, founder and first Inspector General of the Syrian Brotherhood. Hawwa also continued his education in Sufism under the tutelage of a number of shaykhs in Damascus, the most notable of whom was `Abd al-Karim al-Rifa`i (Arabic عبد الكريم الرفاعي) of the Zayd Ibn Thabit Mosque. In particular, al-Rifa`i's idea of "a school in every mosque" shaped Hawwa's thinking regarding the conditions required to ensure a proper religious education for Muslims in the modern age.

=== Professional life ===
Hawwa graduated in 1961 and took posts as a school teacher responsible for religious instruction first in a town in the governorate of al-Hasaka and then in city of Salamiyah near Hama. Salamiyah's proximity to Hama allowed Hawwa to remain active in the Brotherhood's activities there, and he played a small role in general strike in April 1964 that resulted in the 1964 Hama riot.

=== Life in Saudi Arabia ===
Due to increasing tensions between the Ba`thist regime and the Syrian Brotherhood, Hawwa spent the period between 1966 and 1971 in Saudi Arabia, where he authored his first major works, including what was to become his most famous work Jund Allāh Thaqāfatan wa Akhlāqan (Soldiers of God, Culturally and Morally).

=== Return to Syria and imprisonment ===
Hawwa returned to Syria in the aftermath of the détente that followed Hafez al-Assad's taking power in the 1970 Syrian Corrective Revolution. Hawwa quickly returned to activism, leading a campaign in 1973 to rally Syrian ulema against Asad's proposed permanent constitution. As a result of this, he was imprisoned in the Mezzeh prison in Damascus for the next five years. While in prison, he completed a number of additional works, including his eleven-volume exegesis (tafsīr) of the Qur'an.

=== Release and exile ===
Hawwa was released in 1978 and quickly left Syria for Amman, Jordan. While in exile, Hawwa continued to write and served in leadership positions in the Brotherhood, the Islamic Front in Syria (Arabic الجبهة الإسلامية في سوريا) (an Islamic umbrella group that emerged in 1980), and in the international organization of the Muslim Brotherhood. Hawwa suffered from a number of illnesses, including diabetes, and died in 1989 in Amman.

== Ideas and influence ==
Scholars differ regarding Hawwa's intellectual orientation. Emmanuel Sivan refers to Hawwa as a "disciple" of Sayyid Qutb and, like Qutb, a proponent of Islamic revolution. Similarly, Stephane Lacroix calls Hawwa a "convinced Qutbist." Itzchak Weismann, on the other hand, believes Hawwa rejected Qutb's ideas.

=== Quranic commentary ===
Michael Cook highlights Hawwa's differences with Qutb on Islamic doctrine in which Hawwa takes a more traditionalist/literalist not more moderate position than Qutb. Comparing the commentary on the Quran by Hawwa with that of Sayyid Qutb (and early modernists Muhammad Abduh and Rashid Rida), Cook notes that unlike Qutb (and Abduh and Rida) when it comes to commenting on 2:256,

- No compulsion is there in religion. Rectitude has become clear from error.

Hawwa does not take the opportunity to denounce the misconception of Islam being "spread by the sword", and agrees with early commentators that Christians and Jews must pay tribute to avoid conversion to Islam by.

In his commentary on 7:163–166, which alludes to a story of violators of the sabbath being turned into apes ("miserably slinking") by God, Hawwa also differs with Qutb and the other commentators taking the story literally and denouncing attempts by modern Muslims to reinterpret the verse as a metaphor.

On the subject of 4:34 which is traditionally interpreted as endorsing male dominance and the right of husbands (under some circumstances) to beat disobedient wives --

- Men are in charge of women by [right of] what Allah has given one over the other and what they spend [for maintenance] from their wealth. So righteous women are devoutly obedient, guarding in [the husband's] absence what Allah would have them guard. But those [wives] from whom you fear arrogance - [first] advise them; [then if they persist], forsake them in bed; and [finally], strike them. But if they obey you [once more], seek no means against them. Indeed, Allah is ever Exalted and Grand.

Hawwa again differs from the other commentators by excoriating supporters of "freedom and equality for women", and by not including qualifiers to the verse (beating is a last resort, the verse only concerns husbands and wives, the husband should not be a dictator) or complements towards women (women often excel their husbands in many areas) to soften his defense of the verse.

== Works ==
- Allah Jalla Jalaluhu (الله جل جلاله)
- Al-Rasul Salla Allah `Alayhi wa Sallim (الرسول صلى الله عليه وسلم)
- Al-Islam (الإسلام)
- Jund Allah Thaqafatan wa Akhlakan (جند الله ثقافة وأخلاقا)
- Min Ajl Khutwa Ila al-Amam `ala Tariq al-Jihad al-Mubarak (من أجل خطوة إلى الأمام على طريق الجهاد المبارك)
- Tarbiyyatuna al-Ruhiyya (تربيتنا الروحية)
- Fi Afaq al-Ta`alim (في آفاق التعاليم)
- Jawlat fi al-Fiqhayn al-Kabir wa al-Akbar (جولات في الفقهين الكبير والآكبر)
- Al-Madkhal ila Da`wat al-Ikhwan al-Muslimin (مدخل إلى دعوة الإخوان المسلمين)
- Hadhahi Tajribati wa Hadhahi Shahadati (هذه تجربتي وهذه شهادتي)
- Kay La Namdi Ba`idan `an Ihtiyajat al-`Asr (كي لا نمضي بعيدا عن احتياجات العصر)
- Jund Allah Takhtitan (جند الله تخطيطا)
- Jund Allah Tanziman (جند الله تنظيما)
- Al-Asas fi al-Tafsir (الأساس في التفسير)
- Al-Asas fi al-Sunna wa Fiqhiha (الأساس في السنة وفقهها)
- Al-Khumayniyya: shudhudh fil-'aqa'id, shudhudh fil-mawaqif (Khomeinism: Deviations in faith, deviations in political positions)
