= ʽAdnan ʽUqla =

Syrian Islamist insurgent (born 1950)

Adnan Uqla عدنان عقلة
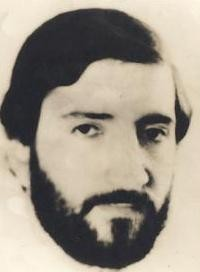
- Uqla, sometime in the late 1970s

Leader of the Fighting Vanguard
- In office June 1979 – April 1982
- Preceded by: Abdel Sattar al-Za’im

Personal details
- Born: 5 January 1950 (age 76) Khisfin, Quneitra, First Syrian Republic (present-day Haspin, Israeli-occupied Golan)
- Died: Disappeared c. 1982 (aged 32); Presumed dead

Military service
- Allegiance: Ba'athist Syria (until 1979); Muslim Brotherhood
- Branch/service: Syrian Army (until 1979); Fighting Vanguard
- Battles/wars: Islamist uprising in Syria; Aleppo Artillery School massacre; Siege of Aleppo; Hama massacre (MIA)

Adnan Uqla (Arabic: عدنان عقلة) was a Syrian Islamist insurgent who served as the leader of the Fighting Vanguard; a Sunni Islamist militant group connected to the Muslim Brotherhood that led the failed Islamist insurrection in Syria. He was noted as being particularly pious and of being the Vanguard's most charismatic and influential figure.

== Early life and education ==
Uqla, the son of a baker, was born into a middle-class family in Quneitra in 1950. Uqla studied civil engineering, and also served in the Syrian Army as an officer.

== Islamic uprising in Syria ==
Uqla played a key role in the planning of the Aleppo Artillery School massacre in 1979.

Uqla declared the independence of the Fighting Vanguard from the Muslim Brotherhood in January 1981, and claimed that he was continuing the fight against the Syrian government for the sake of God.

Uqla arrived in Hama anticipating the beginning of a general uprising against the Syrian government.

Despite having broken with the Muslim Brotherhood, Uqla was only officially dismissed from his position as leader of the Fighting Vanguard in April 1982, following the Hama Massacre. Many leaders of the political wing of the Muslim Brotherhood fled to Iraq, and although the Iraqi government welcomed the political leaders, it refused to provide refuge to leaders of the Fighting Vanguard. According to some reports Uqla was arrested when trying to sneak back into Syria in 1983 or 1984, after being refused refuge in Iraq. Other sources cite him as being killed in 1982, or being caught by Syrian security forces in late 1982. None of these reports however could be verified and Uqla thus remains missing.

== See also ==
- List of people who disappeared
