= Tadmor Prison =

Former prison in Syria

- Interactive map of Tadmor Prison
- Location: Tadmur, Homs Governorate, Syria; 34°33′32″N 38°17′7″E
- Status: Destroyed by ISIS. Active from 1930s–2001, 2011–2015.

Tadmor Prison (Arabic: سجن تدمر), referred to as the Desert Prison, was a prison in Palmyra, approximately 200 kilometres northeast of Damascus.

Tadmor prison was known for harsh conditions, extensive human rights abuse, torture and summary executions. A 2001 report by Amnesty International called it a source of "despair, torture and degrading treatment."

It was captured and destroyed by militants of the Islamic State (IS) in May 2015.

== History ==
=== Founding ===
The structures were originally built as military barracks by the French Mandate forces. According to some reports the building began to be used as a prison for political prisoners starting in 1963, after the 1963 coup d'état. With the rise of Hafez al-Assad to power in the 1970s the prison was significantly expanded.

=== Prison massacre ===
During the 1980s the prison housed thousands of Syrian prisoners, both political and criminal. On June 27, 1980, it was the scene of the Tadmor Prison massacre, perpetrated by Rifaat al-Assad, the day after the Syrian branch of the Islamist Muslim Brotherhood narrowly failed in an attempt to assassinate his brother, president Hafez al-Assad. Members of the Defence Brigades, under the command of Rifaat al-Assad, entered Tadmor Prison at dawn by helicopter and murdered an estimated 500 to 1,100 prisoners in the cells and the dormitories using grenades and machine guns. The massacre is well known throughout Syria.

=== Closure and reopening ===
Tadmor was closed in 2001 and all remaining detainees were transferred to other prisons in Syria. Tadmor Prison was reopened on June 15, 2011 and 350 individuals arrested for participation in anti-government demonstrations were transferred there for interrogation and detainment.

=== Destruction ===
In May 2015 the prison was captured by the Islamic State, who also took over the prison, released the prisoners and showed a video of its interior. Islamic State militants then used explosives to blow up the prison complex on 30 May.

== See also ==
- Adra Prison
- Hama massacre
- Human rights in Syria
- List of massacres in Syria
