= Marwan Hadid =

Syrian Islamist insurgent (1934–1976)

Marwan Hadid مروان حديد
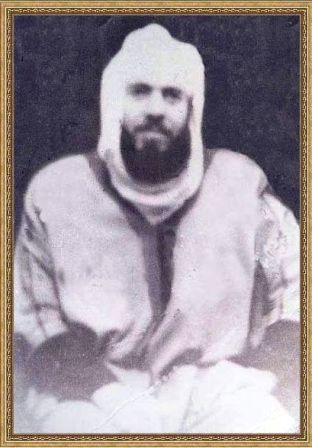
- Hadid in the 1970s

Leader of the Fighting Vanguard
- In office 1964 – June 1975
- Succeeded by: Abdel Sattar al-Za’im

Personal details
- Born: 1934 Hama, First Syrian Republic
- Died: 1976 (age 42) Mezzeh prison, Syria

Military service
- Allegiance: Fighting Vanguard
- Battles/wars: 1964 Hama riot Islamist uprising in Syria (POW)

Marwan Hadid (Arabic: مروان حديد; 1934 –1976) was a Syrian militant leader and Islamic preacher who served as the leader of the Fighting Vanguard from 1964 until 1975.

Hadid led a "hardline insurgent current" of the Muslim Brotherhood, and his endeavors throughout the late 1960s and early 1970s led to the growth of a nationwide network of Islamist militants who wanted to push the Muslim Brotherhood into an open confrontation with the Ba'athist government of Syria.

Hadid established the Fighting Vanguard which was the military wing of the Syrian Muslim Brotherhood. Hadid was the main leader spearheading the Islamist uprising in Syria and he personally led the 1964 armed Islamist uprising in Hama against the Syrian Ba'athist regime. However, in 1976, he was captured by Syrian government forces and died in the Mezzeh prison that same year.

Historian Eugene Rogan described Hadid as "one of Hama's most charismatic imams in the 1960s and said that he "was particularly successful in recruiting students to the underground Islamist movement in Syria." "For many of the young Islamists, Hadid was an inspiration and a role model for radical Sunni Islamist activism."

Following the fall of the Assad regime, a mosque in Hama known as Al-Madfan Mosque was renovated and renamed after him.

== See also ==
- Fighting Vanguard
- Islamist uprising in Syria
