= Al-Jama'a =

Small political group in Syria

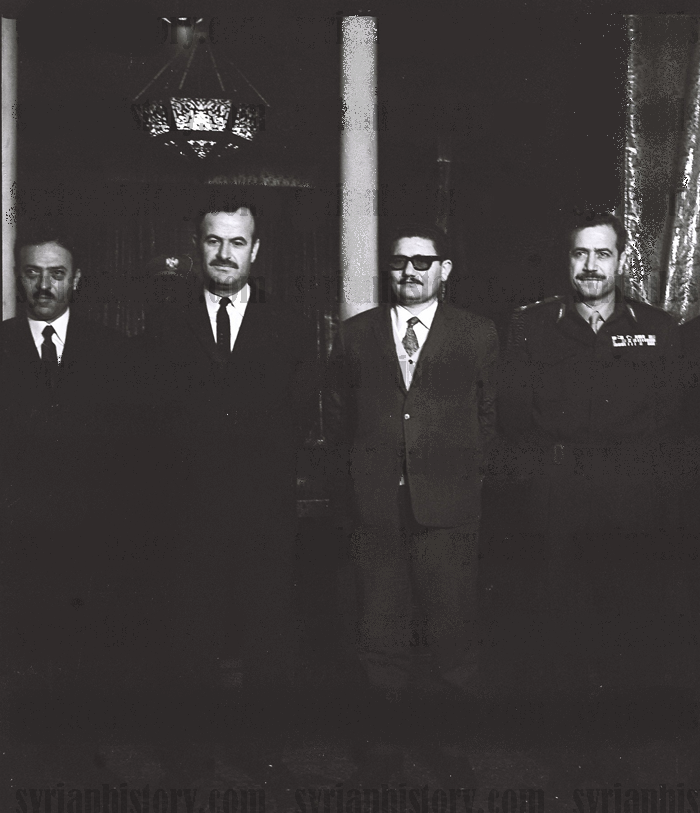
Hafez al-Assad with other top officials of Syria in 1971

The al-Jama'a (Arabic: الجماعة), also sometimes referred as Jam'a, was an unofficial and small political group of people closest to Syrian President Hafez al-Assad. The Jama'a was the main, the most influential political and military elite in all of Ba'athist Syria and had the greatest influence on President Assad's final decisions. The exact and complete personnel of Jama'a is unknown, but many high-ranking politicians were members of it. Jama'a is translates from Arabic as "company," "group," or sometimes "gang."

== History and role ==
Jama'a gradually formed in the 1960s, when Syria was already under the control of the Ba'ath Party, but not yet under Assad. These people supported and helped Assad rise to the top of power, and later became the most influential elite of his regime. In fact, it was the Jama'a who were the founders and basis of the Hafez al-Assad regime. The main purpose of Jama'a unofficial existence was to advise Assad on the proper management of the country and the protection of his rule from internal enemies, on the conduct of foreign policy, and on other important issues in Syria. It played a vital role in Hafez al-Assad's decisions regarding domestic and foreign policy - for example, it was on the numerous advice of Jama'a members that Assad introduced the socialist program of partial economic liberalization known as al-infiraj. Jama'a had connections with businessmen outside of it (later known as the "New Class"), so the infiraj policy came in very handy: it opened up new opportunities for greater wealth. The Jama'a is the apex of the Hafez al-Assad regime's complex patronage system, controlling everything below it. As noted in a number of documents and books, the survival of Hafez al-Assad's regime was due to his skillful balancing between the army, the party, and the Jama'a.

=== 1983-1984 Government crisis ===
In 1983-1984, Hafez al-Assad's health deteriorated significantly, rendering him unable to govern. Anticipating this, he created a six-member committee to act as an interim government. However, the Jama'a retained its power and maintained strong ties to this committee (some of its members was part of a new committee). The president's brother, Rifaat al-Assad, assumed Hafez would never regain power and began attempts to seize power for himself. A series of conflicts erupted with forces still loyal to Hafez, as most politicians and military personnel, as well as all members of the Jama'a, did not support Rifaat. The escalation of the conflict, threatening to escalate into civil war, culminated in the "Poster War" in late 1983 and clashes between Defense Companies militia and the 3rd Armored Division in February 1984. A coup attempt was launched in March, but it failed before it could begin. Rifaat was expelled from Jama'a (and later expelled from Syria altogether) after it.

== Composition ==
Although there were many Alawites in the Jama'a, there were also Sunnis and even Christians (although there were an order of magnitude fewer of them). The core leadership of the party's Regional Command was heavily populated by Jama'a members, leading to a strong level of centralization and Jama'a's monopoly on power in the country. At least the following individuals are known to have been members of the Jama'a: Abdullah al-Ahmar, Mustafa Tlass, Abdul Halim Khaddam, Hikmat al-Shihabi, Muhammad Ali al-Halabi, Yusuf Shakkur, and (until 1984) Rifaat al-Assad. However, the Jama'a was likely even larger.

The Jama'a mainly consisted of the Assad family members, Alawites, or Sunnis who were very close to Assad. It also included commanders of intelligence services (such as Air Force Intelligence Directorate), elite army units (such as the Republican Guard or, before its disbandment in 1984, the Defense Companies) that were responsible for guarding key facilities in Syria, such as the presidential palace, airports, or radio and television stations (however, many of them were also either Alawites or members of the Assad family). Jama'a wasn't a monolithic group—disagreements persisted among its members. However, all were personally loyal to Assad. The core of Jama'a is considered to be three Sunni politicians who had long-standing friendly ties with Assad - Abdul Halim Khaddam, Mustafa Tlass and Abdullah al-Ahmar.

== See also ==
- Revolutionary Command Council (Iraq)
- Control and Inspection Committee
- National Council for the Revolutionary Command
- Central Command of the Arab Socialist Ba'ath Party – Syria Region
- Makhzen – Alleged Moroccan monarchial deep state counterpart
- Le Pouvoir – Alleged Algerian military-intelligence deep state counterpart
  - Les éradicateurs – Hardline secularist faction of Le Pouvoir
