= 1984 Syrian coup attempt =

30-31 March attempted overthrow of Syrian government

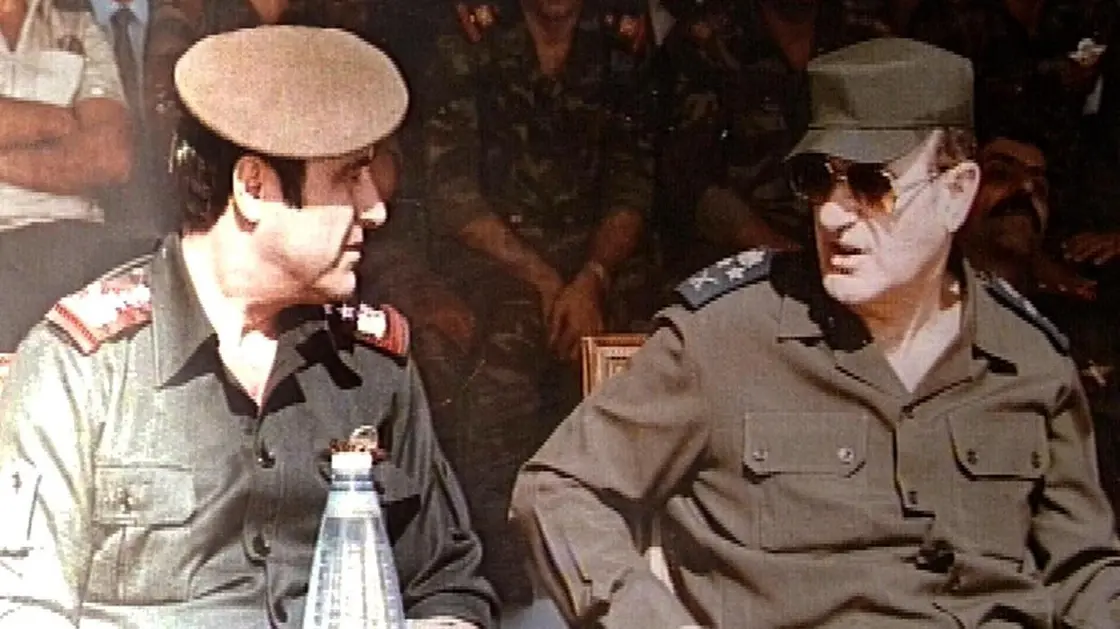
- Rifaat al-Assad and Hafez al-Assad before the conflict.
Date	March 30–31, 1984
Location	Syria
Result	Coup attempt failed: President Hafez al-Assad remains in power; Rifaat went into exile in Europe; Defense Companies disbanded

Belligerents
(Ba'athist Syria) Syrian Government; Syrian Armed Forces; Ba'ath Party	Defence Companies; Government and army dissidents

Commanders and leaders
Committee for governing the country; Mustafa Tlass; Abdul Halim Khaddam; Abdullah al-Ahmar; Zuhair Masharqa; Abdul Rauf al-Kasm; Hikmat al-Shihabi; Hafez al-Assad	Rifaat al-Assad

Casualties and losses
- No casualties

The 1984 Syrian coup attempt refers to an attempt in March 1984 by Rifaat al-Assad to overthrow his brother, Syrian President Hafez al-Assad. Tens of thousands of soldiers with armored vehicles (some supported Rifaat, some supported Hafez) gathered in the capital Damascus and were on the verge of a military clash.

== Background ==
Hafez al-Assad came to power in 1970 after the "Corrective Revolution". Al-Assad created a military dictatorship (much stronger than his predecessors) with a cult of personality around his family. In the new regime built by Hafez, Rifaat played a huge role, commanding the Defense Brigades, an all-Alawite paramilitary force independent of the Syrian Arab Army and responsible for defending Damascus from internal and external attacks.

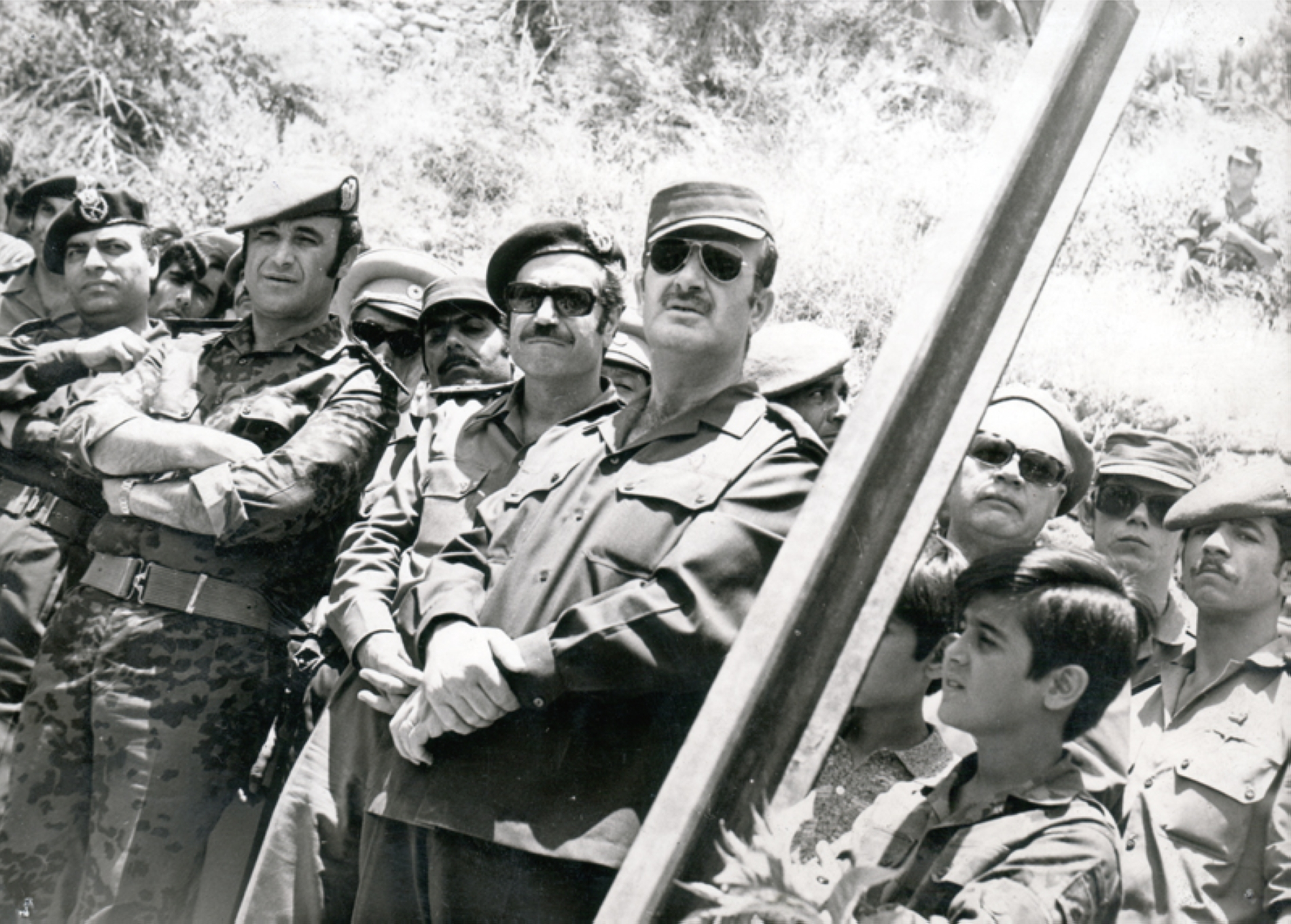
Rifaat (left) and Hafez visiting military camp, 1978.

General Rifaat became a powerful figure in the Ba'ath party and Syrian politics, as a result of his activities in the Lebanese Civil War. Until 1984, many saw Rifaat as the likely successor to his elder brother.

Rifaat was actively involved in defending the regime during the Islamist uprising in Syria and suppressing the Syrian Muslim Brotherhood: for example, Rifaat and the Defense Brigades under his control were responsible for the Tadmor Prison massacre on June 27, 1980, in which approximately 1,000 prisoners were killed.

Rifaat's larger military campaign to suppress the rebellion was the Hama Massacre of 1982, which left two-thirds of the city destroyed and tens of thousands of people, mostly civilians, killed: Rifaat himself boasted that the death toll was around 38,000. Initially, there were no reasons that could have caused the coup.

== Split and conflict ==
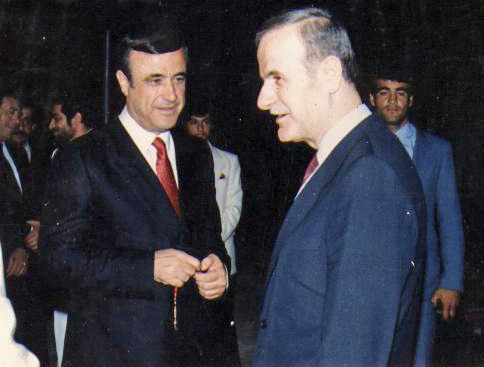
Rifaat and Hafez, 1980s.

On 12 November 1983 Hafez Assad, a diabetic, had a heart attack complicated by phlebitis and was forced to go to the hospital. But he established a six-member committee to run the country composed of Abdul Halim Khaddam, Abdullah al-Ahmar, Mustafa Tlass, Hikmat al-Shihabi, Abdul Rauf al-Kasm and Zuhair Masharqa. Rifaat was not included, and the council consisted entirely of close Sunni Muslim loyalists to Hafez, who were mostly lightweights in the military-security establishment. This caused unease in the Alawi-dominated officer corps (especially Defence Brigades), and several high-ranking officers began rallying around Rifaat, while others remained loyal to Hafez's instructions: all this triggered a succession crisis. On 13 November, after visiting his brother in the hospital, Rifaat al-Assad reportedly announced his candidacy for president; he did not believe Assad would be able to continue ruling the country. When he did not receive support from Assad's inner circle, he made, in the words of historian Hanna Batatu, "abominably lavish" promises to win them over.

Although it is unclear if any top officials supported Rifaat al-Assad, most did not. He lacked his brother's stature and charisma, and was vulnerable to charges of corruption. His Defense Brigades were viewed with suspicion by the upper leadership and throughout society; they were considered corrupt, poorly disciplined and indifferent to human suffering. Rifaat al-Assad also lacked military support; officers and soldiers resented the Defense Companies' monopoly of Damascus' security, their separate intelligence services and prisons and their higher pay. He did not abandon the hope of succeeding his brother, opting to take control of the country through his post as Commander of Defense Companies. In what became known as the "poster war", personnel from the Defense Companies replaced posters of Assad in Damascus with those of Rifaat al-Assad. The security service, still loyal to Hafez, responded by replacing Rifaat al-Assad's posters with Hafez's. The poster war lasted for a week until Assad's health improved.

Shortly after the poster war, all of Rifaat al-Assad's proteges were removed from positions of power. This decree nearly sparked a clash between the Defense Brigades and the Republican Guard on 27 February 1984, but conflict was avoided by Rifaat al-Assad's appointment as one of three Vice Presidents on 11 March. He acquired this post by surrendering his position as Commander of Defense Companies to a Hafez supporter. Rifaat al-Assad was succeeded as Defense Companies head by his son-in-law.

== The coup attempt ==
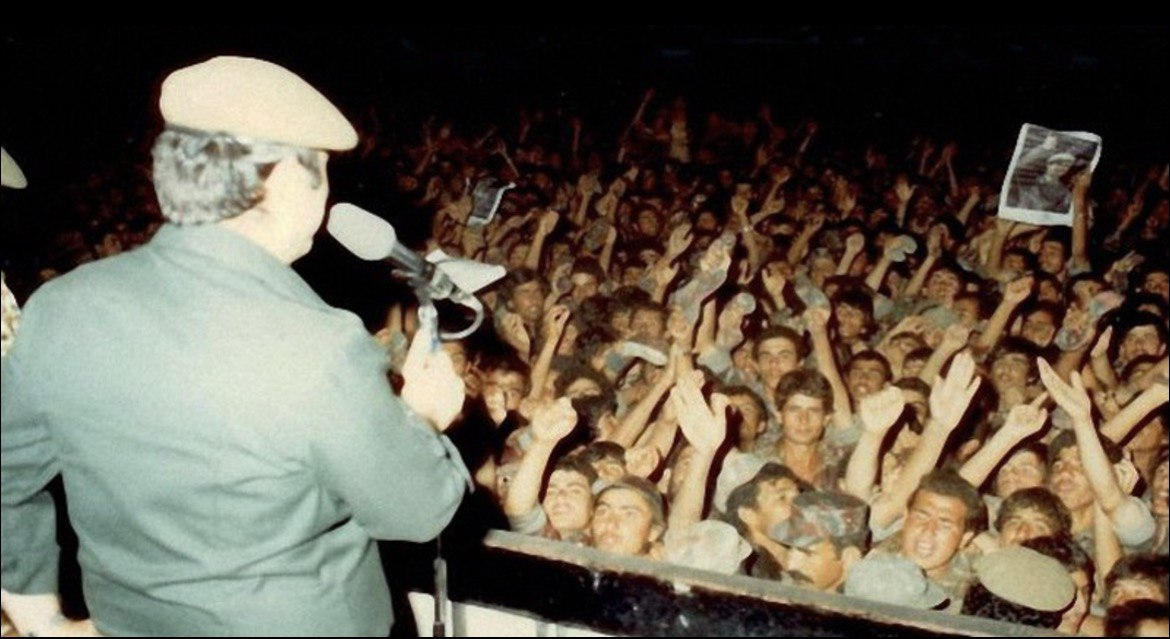
Rifaat al-Assad with crowd of paratroopers from "Defense Companies"

During the night of 30 March, Rifaat ordered his loyalists from Defense Brigades to seal Damascus off and advance to the city: Rifaat's troops, numbering more than 55,000 soldiers with tanks, artillery, aircraft and helicopters, began asserting control over Damascus. A squadron of Rifaat's T-72 tanks took position at the central roundabout of Kafr Sousa and in Mount Qasioun, overlooking the city. Rifaat's forces set up checkpoints and roadblocks, put up posters of him in State buildings, disarmed regular troops and arbitrarily arrested soldiers of the regular Army, occupied and commandeered Police Stations, Intelligence buildings, and State buildings; the Defense Companies rapidly outnumbered and took control over both the Special Forces and the Republican Guard. Rifaat's plan might have succeeded if Special Forces commander Ali Haydar supported him, but Haydar sided with the president. Haydar reportedly said:

"I recognise no leader in the country other than Hafez al-Assad! What I have of power and prestige I owe to him. I am a soldier in his service and a slave to his beck and call. While I am alive I bear obedience to him and will not fall away from him."

Haydar deployed his Special Forces against the Defense Companies of Rifaat on the streets of Damascus, using his Anti-Tank platoons to directly challenge Rifaat's T-72 Tank units which were threatening government buildings. Haydar also ordered his sniper platoons which were deployed by parachute or from helicopters, to take up key positions near the residences of known Defense Company commanders in order to psychologically terrorize them. Sniper units also tactically besieged the Mezzeh Airbase and some other vital Defense Company bases and installations. Although Damascus was divided between two armies and seemed on the brink of war, Rifaat did not move. Informed that Rifaat was heading to Damascus, his brother Hafez al-Assad left his headquarters to meet him.

British journalist Patrick Seale reports an intimate moment between the two brothers :

At Rifat's home in Mezze the brothers were at last face to face. 'You want to overthrow the regime?' Asad asked. 'Here I am. I am the regime.' For an hour they stormed at each other but, in his role of elder brother and with his mother in the house, Asad could not fail to win the contest. Deferring to him at last, as he had so often done in their youths, Rifat chose to accept (although with some inward scepticism) Asad's pledge that trust between them would be restored and would be the basis for their future work together.

There was a clear division and tensions between forces loyal to Hafez, namely the 3rd Armoured Division (commanded by General Shafiq Fayadh), the Republican Guard (commanded by General Adnan Makhlouf), the various Intelligence services (commanded by Generals Mohamed Khouli and Ali Duba), the National Police, and the Special Forces (commanded by Ali Haydar); and the Defense Companies loyal to Rifaat. By the middle of 1984 Hafez had returned from his sick bed and assumed full control, at which point most officers rallied around him. Initially, it seemed that Rifaat was going to be put on trial and even faced a questioning that was broadcast on television. However, this did not happen, with Hafez simply punishing Rifaat with exile to europe, ending the coup attempt. Potential civil war was only averted through the action of Hafez, who intervened and placated Rifaat by making him Vice President, before sending him off into exile.

== Consequences ==
In what at first seemed a compromise, Rifaat was made vice-president with responsibility for security affairs, but this proved a wholly nominal post. Rifaat was then sent to the Soviet Union on "an open-ended working visit". At May, 27, he went into exile. His closest supporters and others who had failed to prove their loyalty to Hafez were purged from the army and Ba'ath Party in the years that followed. The Defense Brigades were reduced by 30,000–35,000 men (and to 18,000 men later), and their role was assumed by the Republican Guard. Later, Defence Brigades was dismantled at all and merged into the Syrian Arab Armed Forces expanding the Republican Guard and 14th Special Forces Division. The rump force then became the 569th Armored Division which later became the 4th Armoured Division. Makhluf, the Republican Guard commander was promoted to major general, and Hafez's son Bassel al-Assad, then an army major, became influential in the guard.

Hafez stopped counting on Rifaat and seeing him as his successor, choosing instead his eldest son Bassel Assad. However, Bassel died in a car accident in 1994, which led to Hafez choosing the younger Bashar Assad, who was studying ophthalmology in London, to become his successor, which then occurred after his death in 2000 and Bashar became the president that same year; although he ruled for 24 years until he and the entire Assad dynasty was overthrown in 2024.
