= Reactions to the death of Kim Jong Il =

Posthumous portrait of Kim Jong Il

Many countries, organizations, and individuals issued reactions to the death of Kim Jong Il in December 2011. According to CNN, reactions were "somewhat muted" in comparison to deaths of other world leaders. Just a few countries reacted immediately after Kim's death was announced on North Korea's KCTV. Some countries, like the United States, took the opportunity to comment on their relationship with South Korea. South Korea decided not to offer official condolences, mirroring both worsened relations after the ROKS Cheonan sinking and the bombardment of Yeonpyeong and its position after the death of Kim Il Sung in 1994. Chinese Foreign Ministry called Kim a "great leader" and added that Beijing would continue to offer its support. Japan expressed condolences and said it hoped Kim's death would not affect the region adversely. Reactions in Europe were "a mix of hope and watchfulness". In North Korea, the official reaction was grief and support for the succession of Kim Jong Un.

== Korean peninsula ==
=== Democratic People's Republic of Korea ===
Korean Central News Agency announced the news, stating on 19 December:

The body of National Defense Commission Chairman Kim will lie in state at Kumsusan Memorial Palace during the period of mourning from the 17th to the 29th. Visitors will be received between the 20th and 27th. The ceremony for his parting will be performed on the 28th in Pyongyang. Central memorial meetings to honor Chairman Kim will open on the 29th. At that time, in Pyongyang and sites in every province, there will be an artillery salute and three minutes of silence, and all official vehicles and vessels will sound their horns.

Images showed that in the streets of Pyongyang, many people wept over Kim's death. People could be seen gathering to pay their respects, some kneeling, some wailing, and some beating the ground with their fists.

The BBC reported that the Korean Central News Agency said people were convulsing with pain and despair at their loss, but would unite behind his successor Kim Jong Un. They said that all party members, military men, and the public should faithfully follow the leadership of comrade Kim Jong Un and protect and further strengthen the unified front of the party, military, and the public.

Workplaces and local government offices have organised meetings to create a proper atmosphere of mourning. People's Units have emphasised the Last Instructions of Kim Jong Il and groups from schools and workplaces have been visiting statues of Kim Il Sung and other major memorials to pay their respects.

=== Republic of Korea ===
After the death was announced, the South Korean military was put on high alert. The South's National Security Council, worried that political jockeying in North Korea could destabilise the region, also convened for an emergency meeting. President Lee Myung-bak cancelled the rest of his Monday schedule and in a statement, declared, "[f]or the sake of the future of the Republic of Korea, peace and stability on the Korean Peninsula is more important than anything else. It should not be threatened by what has happened. We must make thorough preparations to maintain peace and stability and continue to work closely with the international community ... All citizens are asked to go about their lives without wavering so that peace and stability on the Korean Peninsula will not be hampered". No government officials from Seoul paid condolences, according to the Unification Ministry. Lee Hee-ho, the 89-year-old widow of former South Korean President Kim Dae-jung, and Hyundai Group Chairwoman Hyun Jeong-eun led a private group of 18 South Koreans on a two-day visit, where state media showed them being greeted by Kim Jong Un on 26 December.

== Supranational bodies ==
- European Union – Catherine Ashton, the High Representative of the Union for Foreign Affairs and Security Policy, said that "the EU is monitoring the situation closely and is in contact with its strategic partners with a view to sharing assessments on the possible implications". In the name of all EU countries, the Polish diplomat signed the condolence book in Pyongyang.
- United Nations – A spokesman for U.N. Secretary General Ban Ki-moon said, "The Secretary-General extends his sympathy to the people of the DPRK at this time of their national mourning. The Secretary-General reaffirms his commitment to peace and security on the Korean peninsula. The United Nations system will continue to help the people of the DPRK. The Secretary-General is closely following the situation".

== Governments ==
- Armenia – President Serzh Sargsyan sent condolences. The message was reported to have been addressed to the DPRK's president, who would in fact be the Eternal President of the Republic Kim Il Sung, who died in 1994.
- Australia – Called on governments, including North Korea's, for "calm and restraint" in the aftermath of Kim Jong Il's death, and also urged the DPRK to "engage with the global community". Foreign Minister Kevin Rudd stated, "[i]t is at times like this that we cannot afford to have any wrong or ambiguous signaling. This time also presents an important opportunity to the new North Korean leadership to engage fully with the international community. On how to improve their economy in order to properly feed their people and critically on how to deal with the outstanding problem of North Korea's nuclear weapons programme".
- Azerbaijan – President Ilham Aliyev sent a letter to Kim Yong-nam, Chairman of the Presidium of the Supreme People's Assembly, which stated, "I was deeply saddened to hear about the death of the prominent statesman, Supreme Leader of the Democratic People's Republic of Korea, Chairman of the National Defence Commission, Kim Jong-il. On behalf of myself and the people of Azerbaijan, I expressed my deepest condolences to you, to the family of the deceased and to your people over this heavy loss".
- Bangladesh – President Zillur Rahman and Prime Minister Sheikh Hasina each sent their condolences to North Korea over Jong-il's death. "The people of DPR Korea have lost a great leader and we have lost a dear friend", President Rahman said. Prime Minister Hasina said, "Our hearts are with the members of the bereaved family and the people of DPR Korea and we pray that they will be able to bear this irreparable loss with courage and fortitude."
- Belarus – President Alexander Lukashenko sent his condolences to Kim Jong Un over his father's death.
- Cambodia – "Kim Jong-il has died, but the friendship and bilateral cooperation between North Korea and Cambodia will never die", a spokesman for the Cambodian Council of Ministers said. The spokesman continued, "North Korea is a sovereign country and can make whatever political decisions it needs to for the good of their land – they know what is best for them. But for us, we have a relationship that has been improving, and over time this has opened up many opportunities for bilateral trade". Meanwhile, the Minister of Information Khieu Kanharith said the death of Kim Jong Il was a "great loss". Kanharith added, "We hope that (Kim's) plans to act as a mediator for reconciliation of the two Koreas continue in the interest of the peninsula, Asia and the world".
- Canada – Prime Minister Stephen Harper said, "Kim Jong Il will be remembered as the leader of a totalitarian regime who violated the basic rights of the North Korean people for nearly two decades. We hope his passing brings positive change allowing the people of North Korea to emerge from six decades of isolation, oppression and misery. ... At this critical juncture, we urge North Korea to close this sad chapter in its history and to work once more towards promoting both the well-being of its people and stability on the Korean peninsula.”
- China – Foreign Minister Yang Jiechi met with Pak Myong-ho, chargé d'affaires of the DPRK Embassy in Beijing. He expressed the belief "the DPRK people would remain united with the leadership of the Workers' Party of Korea and comrade Kim Jong-Un, turn their sorrow into strength, achieve new progress in socialist construction, and make new contributions to realizing the sustainable peace and stability of the Korean Peninsula". Foreign Ministry spokesman Ma Zhaoxu called Jong-il a "great leader" and added Beijing would continue to offer its support and make "active contributions to peace and stability on the Korean peninsula and in this region".
- Croatia – President Ivo Josipović expressed condolences to the citizens of DPRK and said, "Dear HE Kim Jong-un, I, on behalf of the people of the Republic of Croatia and on my own, express condolences on the demise of the great leader of the Korean people HE Kim Jong-il, general secretary of the Workers' Party of Korea, chairman of the National Defence Commission of the DPRK and supreme commander of the Korean People's Army. I extend condolences to all the people of the DPRK".
- Cuba – "Cuba's Council of State has declared official mourning due to the passing of comrade Kim Jong-il", an official statement said, noting that Cuba's flag would be flown at half staff from 20 to 22 December.
- Equatorial Guinea – President Teodoro Obiang Nguema Mbasogo expressed his and the Equatoguinean people's "deepest condolences" regarding Kim Jong Il's death in a letter addressed to Kim Jong Un.
- Ethiopia – "At this hour of mourning, we express our heartfelt sympathy and deep condolences to the people and government of the DPRK", President Girma Wolde-Giorgis wrote in a letter of condolences addressed to Kim Jong Un.
- Finland – The Minister for Foreign Affairs Erkki Tuomioja said in an interview that "Kim Jong-il probably won't be missed by most people" and expressed concern about the ruling elite strengthening its grip in fear of unstable consequences. President Tarja Halonen, however, expressed empathy for the close ones of the deceased and wished for democratic reforms.
- France – The Foreign Ministry released a statement saying that France "reaffirms its commitment to peace and stability in the peninsula and hopes the North Korean regime will evolve in a positive way... Our thoughts go to North Korean people who have been suffering for years from misery and lack of human rights... France will carry on its action for North Korean people, especially by supporting humanitarian programs..." Also, French Foreign Minister Alain Juppé is quoted as having said, "There isn't much hope. It is a completely closed off regime ... We are very cautious about the consequences of this succession. We hope that one day the North Korean people will find freedom. There are ongoing talks with North Korea ... and we need to keep on talking with China and other participants to make North Korea abandon its nuclear weapons".
- Germany – Foreign Minister Guido Westerwelle said, "We hope that a window of opportunity will open for the people of North Korea". Foreign Ministry spokesman Dirk Augustin told journalists, "This is, of course, a chance for things to change there, but our expectations remain the same: That North Korea gives up its nuclear program, that the catastrophic social situation of its own people improves and that it declares itself ready to open up in the political and economic spheres. Whoever takes over power must assume responsibility for improving the desperate situation of the people there. There is a clearly untenable situation with two Korean states".
- Ghana – President John Atta Mills, on behalf of himself and the Ghanaian people, expressed condolences to Kim Jong Un, the government, and people of the DPRK over the demise of Kim Jong Il. Mills also said that Ghana is confident that the "DPRK will advance in unity to attain the goal of building a thriving socialist nation under the leadership of Kim Jong-un, the great successor, and the Workers' Party of Korea".
- Guinea – President Alpha Condé addressed a letter of condolences to Kim Jong Un, saying, "It was with great sorrow that I heard together with the Guinean people the sad news that Kim Jong-il, General Secretary of the Workers' Party of Korea, Chairman of the DPRK National Defence Commission and staunch guardian of the noble cause of the Korean people, passed away. At this moment of grief I, on behalf of the government and the people of Guinea and on my own, express the most profound condolences and ask you to pass my sincere condolences on the brave Korean people.
- Hungary – The Ministry of Foreign Affairs stated, "We hope the Democratic People's Republic of Korea will continue its efforts for the people's development and prosperity after mourning. As well, we also hope North Korea as a responsible country will do everything for the conservation of security and stability in the Korean Peninsula". The ministry also warned North Korea of international concerns about nuclear issues and human rights.
- India – Indian Prime Minister Manmohan Singh mourned Kim Jong Il's death and expressed hope that DPRK would overcome its grief with "courage and fortitude". The Minister of State for External Relations, E. Ahamed, signed the condolence book at the Embassy of the DPRK observing that "it is with a deep sense of sorrow that we have learnt about the sad demise of H.E Kim Jong Il".
- Indonesia – The Ministry of Foreign Affairs sent condolences in the name of the government and the people of Indonesia in a press release. "[The] Indonesian government and people pray for the surviv[ing] family, government, and all North Koreans to be given strength and fortitude during these hard days".
- Ireland – The Journal reported that Ireland had said it had "no plans to issue a statement of any kind on the death of the North Korean leader".
- Japan – Japanese Prime Minister Yoshihiko Noda held an emergency national security council meeting with top Cabinet members soon after the news of Jong-il's death broke. Chief Cabinet Secretary Osamu Fujimura told journalists in Tokyo that the Prime Minister had instructed them to be prepared in case of any unexpected developments. Fujimura expressed condolences and said Japan hoped Kim Jong Il's death would not affect the region, or North Korea, adversely.
- Jordan – King Abdullah II sent a letter of condolences to Kim Jong Un. "It was with the greatest sorrow that I heard the sad news Chairman Kim Jong-il demised. I, on behalf of the people and government of the Hashemite Kingdom of Jordan and on my own, express the sincerest condolences to Your Excellency and hope that Your Excellency will overcome sorrow", King Abdullah II wrote.
- Kazakhstan – "Kim Jong Il, the honored statesman of the Korean nation and distinguished person, made a great contribution to the establishment and strengthening of friendly relations between the two countries", President Nursultan Nazarbayev said in a letter addressed to Kim Jong Il. President Nazarbayev added, "On behalf of the people of Kazakhstan and my own behalf, I would like to extend our heartfelt condolences and sincere sympathies to all the Korean people".
- Malaysia – Malaysian government expresses its condolences to the people and government of North Korea and hopes that the new North Korean leadership will work towards achieving peace and stability in the Korean Peninsula with all parties concerned should work towards ensuring an enduring peace and stability in the Korean Peninsula as the stability in the region is important for regional peace, security and economic development.
- Mongolia – President Tsakhiagiin Elbegdorj and Prime Minister Sükhbaataryn Batbold sent a joint letter of condolences to Kim Jong Un concerning his father's demise.
- Myanmar – Myanmar's Minister for Foreign Affairs Wunna Maung Lwin, signed the Condolence Book opened at the Embassy of the Democratic People's Republic of Korea. A Government official told AFP that "Myanmar will convey its condolences over the demise of North Korean leader Kim Jong-Il" adding "[w]e do not know much about his successor, his son. But we think things can change in his term, especially their economic policy. The misunderstanding with the international community over the relationship between Myanmar and North Korea lately has been removed".
- Nepal – President Ram Baran Yadav and Prime Minister Baburam Bhattarai both sent their condolences to Kim Jong Un over his father's death. President Yadav expressed "deep sorrow" at the demise of Jong-il, and said that the "death of (Jong-il) has been an irreparable loss to the people and the government of the DPRK, and Nepal has lost a friend, too". Prime Minister Bhattari echoed the Nepalese President by saying that Nepal has lost a "great friend".
- Nicaragua – First Lady and government spokeswoman Rosario Murillo said that "the people of Nicaragua and the Government of Nicaragua feel North Korea's pain", and that she hopes North Korea will continue its "process of constructing more peace and more prosperity for all the families of that country". She also said that president Daniel Ortega sent his “profound condolences for the death of Dear Leader Kim Jong-Il”.
- Pakistan – President of Pakistan Asif Ali Zardari expressed condolences to the people of North Korea and said the Kim Jong Il had commanded great respect among his people and that he will be missed by his people.
- Palestinian Authority – President of the Palestinian Authority Mahmoud Abbas said that throughout his whole life, Jong-il has always stood out for global justice and truth and that he strongly supported the cause of the Palestinian people as well. President Abbas also said that the foundations of relations between North Korea and an independent Palestinian state had been laid out between Kim Il Sung and Yasser Arafat.
- Philippines – The Department of Foreign Affairs released a statement, saying "The Government and people of the Philippines convey our condolences to the Government and people of the Democratic People's Republic of Korea (DPRK) on the death of President Kim Jong-Il... [t]he Philippine Government values its relations with the DPRK and will continue to cooperate with them to intensify the promotion and maintenance of peace and stability in the Asia-Pacific region, including in the Korean Peninsula, to ensure the region's continued prosperity".
- Poland – "We observe the situation in the Democratic People’s Republic of Korea and the East Asia region after the death of Kim Jong Il", said a statement by the Foreign Ministry in Warsaw. Foreign Minister Radosław Sikorski "hopes that after the death of the North Korean leader, authorities will act responsibly and in accordance with tie expectations of the international community and the Korean nation", it also stated.
- Qatar – Qatar News Agency said Emir Sheikh Hamad bin Khalifa Al Thani, as well as heir apparent Sheikh Tamim bin Hamad Al Thani had sent cables of condolences to North Korean leader-designate Kim Jong Un on the death of his father.
- Russia – President Dmitry Medvedev expressed condolences over the death of Kim Jong Il, the Kremlin press service reported on Monday. Medvedev also held a phone conversation with South Korean President Lee Myung-bak concerning Kim Jong Il's death, according to the report. The two leaders discussed several issues of common concern, including regional integration and stability. Foreign Minister Sergey Lavrov said: "The DPRK is our neighbor. We maintain a good-neighborly relationship. Of course, we hope that the loss of Kim Jong-Il will not have any impact on the development of our friendly relations with the DPRK".
- Sweden – Swedish Foreign Minister Carl Bildt said on his Twitter account that "The death of a dictator is always a period of uncertainty for a dictatorship, and North Korea is the hardest dictatorship in our time".
- Syria – President Bashar al-Assad, in a letter to Kim Jong Un, described Kim Jong Il's death "as a great loss not only to the Korean people but to the people of all countries struggling for freedom, justice and peace", adding, "May his soul rest in peace".
- United Kingdom – Foreign Secretary William Hague said "The people of North Korea are in official mourning after the death of Kim Jong-Il. We understand this is a difficult time for them. This could be a turning point for North Korea. We hope that their new leadership will recognise that engagement with the international community offers the best prospect of improving the lives of ordinary North Korean people. We encourage North Korea to work for peace and security in the region and take the steps necessary to allow the resumption of the Six Party Talks on denuclearisation of the Korean Peninsula".
- United States – White House spokesman Jay Carney said "The President has been notified and we are in close touch with our allies in South Korea and Japan", and "We remain committed to stability on the Korean peninsula and to the freedom and security of our allies".
- Venezuela – President Hugo Chávez offered condolences to North Korea, expressing his "sincere sorrow". He also asserted Venezuelan solidarity with North Korea.
- Vietnam – Vietnam sent its "deepest condolences" to North Korea on the death of "Comrade Kim Jong-il". It added, "We believe that the DPRK's people will overcome this great loss and continue to strive for building and developing their country".

== Parties and organizations ==
- Bangladesh – Rashed Khan Menon, leader of the Workers Party of Bangladesh stated that "the sudden demise of Kim Jong-il, the prominent leader, is the bitter sorrow not only to the Korean people but also to the Bangladeshi people and the world progressives".
- Benin – The Cowry Forces for an Emerging Benin sent a wreath to Kumsusan.
- Brazil – The Brazilian Communist Party (Marxist–Leninist) sent a message saying "Kim Jong Il would always be with all the Korean people dynamically advancing along the road of justice for sovereignty, independence and socialism". The Communist Party of Brazil and the Party for Free Motherland paid their respects at the DPRK embassy.
- Canada – Sandra Smith, the leader of the Communist Party of Canada (Marxist-Leninist) expressed her "heartfelt condolences on the untimely passing of Comrade Kim Jong-il" and stated that "He is greatly admired by all revolutionary forces for working tirelessly for the peaceful independent reunification of Korea...securing peace on the Korean Peninsula on the basis of the Songun military first policy, thus contributing greatly to world peace".
- Cambodia – A delegation of the Cambodian People's Party visited the DPRK embassy and signed the condolence book. Ney Pena wrote "Kim Jong Il is the supreme leader who led the defence of the country and its construction to victory. The Korean people are highly praising his exploits and always remember his benevolence. The People's Party of Cambodia and the Cambodian people express the deepest condolences to the Workers' Party of Korea and the Korean people". Ouk Phurik, leader of the Khmer Democratic Party also visited the embassy and sent a message to North Korea that stated, in part, "Kim Jong Il laid down the Songun line of the DPRK based on the philosophical principle that the army precisely means the people, the party and the state and led the DPRK for decades to successfully carry forward and accomplish the revolutionary cause of Juche pioneered by HE Generalissimo Kim Il Sung, great leader of the Korean people. His demise amounts to the Korean people's loss of an outstanding hero".
- Czech Republic – The Communist Party of Bohemia and Moravia issued condolences to North Korea following Kim's death.
- Egypt – Sayed Abdul Al, general secretary of the National Progressive Unionist Party, stated that "The untimely demise of leader Kim Jong Il is a shock to the party and all the people aspiring after socialism".
- Guinea – A delegation of members of the Democratic Party of Guinea paid its respects at the DPRK embassy
- Finland – Kalevi Wahrman, on behalf of the Finnish Communists League, stated that the "revolutionary exploits of Kim Jong Il, who dedicated his whole life to the victory of the socialist cause and the people's happiness, would remain in the hearts of humankind".
- Italy – the Party of Italian Communists general secretary Oliviero Diliberto, the secretary of Communist Party (Italy) Marco Rizzo and director of the International Department Fausto Sorini sent a message expressing "the most fraternal and sincere condolences to Kim Jong Un, saying that they remember the great feats Kim Jong Il performed in defending the sovereignty of the DPRK and the dignity of the nation".
- Laos – The Central Committee of the Lao People's Revolutionary Party sent a letter of sympathy to the Workers' Party of Korea, expressing "heartfelt condolences on learning of the death of Kim Jong-il". The letter praised Kim's contributions to the "enhancing (of) the tradition of relations, friendship and cooperation between the two parties, governments and peoples of Laos and DPRK". The death of Kim Jong Il "meant not only the great loss of the leader of the DPRK but also the great loss of a close friend of the Party, government and people of Laos", the letter concluded.
- Lebanon – Khaled Hadadi, general secretary of the Lebanese Communist Party "expressed heartfelt condolences to the Korean people and the C.C., the WPK on the demise of leader Kim Jong Il". Fayez Shukri, secretary of the Arab Socialist Ba'ath Party – Lebanon Region wrote in a condolence book that Kim Jong Ils death "is a big loss not only to the Korean people but also to the Lebanese people and other progressive people in the world as he devoted all his life to the cause of global independence, the socialist cause and the liberation of humankind".
- Malta – The Communist Party of Malta sent its condolences.
- Mongolia – National Democratic Party chairman M. Enkhsaihan sent a message stating in part that Kim Jong Il "will live forever in the hearts of not only the Korean people but all the people supporting and respecting his cause. [And expressed] profound gratitude to Kim Jong Il for the concern he had shown for the development of the friendly and cooperative relations between Mongolia and the DPRK".
- Mozambique – General Secretary of the ruling FRELIMO party Filipe Chimoio Paúnde described Kim Jong Il's death as a "sadness" for the North Korean people. "Considering the relations that exist between the two states we also feel the loss". North Korea "gave its support during the national liberation war" which FRELIMO fought against the colonial power Portugal, Paúnde said.
- Namibia – Pendukeni Iivula Ithana, general secretary of the South West Africa People's Organization sent his condolences, and added "SWAPO Party shall strive to maintain the excellent and cordial relationship between our two sister parties".
- Palestine – Khald Abdul Majid, general secretary of the Palestinian Popular Struggle Front, sent a message to Kim Jong Un "express deepest condolences...on the passing away of the great leader Comrade Kim Jong Il in the crucial period of showdown with the U.S. imperialists, the general secretary said in the message".
- Romania – The chairman and other leaders of the Romanian Socialist Union paid their respects at the DPRK embassy.
- Russia – Funeral wreaths were sent to Kumsusan Memorial Palace from the Communist Party of the Russian Federation, Party for Peace and Unity of Russia, the Communist Party of the Soviet Union (1992–) Messages were also received from the Liberal Democratic Party of Russia and the All-Union Communist Party of Bolsheviks.
- South Africa – A representative of the African National Congress offered his condolences and presented a wreath at the embassy of the DPRK. Another wreath was sent to Pyongyang. The African National Congress Youth League, at the time headed by Julius Malema, issued a statement sending its condolences, and stating "As we remember this revolutionary we call upon the Korean people to forge ahead with the struggle to reunify their country, to free it completely of a legacy of Colonialism left to its people by imperialists represented by the United States of America. May the undying spirit of Comrade Kim Jong Il continue to inspire the Korean people to defend the Songhun, the idea that it is possible for the people of Korea, Asia and the world to live well alongside each other in an egalitarian society, free from poverty, joblessness, hatred of each other and the oppression of one country by another".
- Syria – Mohammed Saeed Bekheitan, the Assistant Secretary of the Regional Command of the Syrian-dominated Ba'ath Party, sent a message of condolence stating "that the world movement for liberation and peace lost the most prominent fighter who had defended the people's right from highhanded practices and supremacy by the world imperialists... [and] affirming the will to boost the ties of friendship and cooperation in the struggle to meet the challenge Syria and the DPRK are facing".
- Tajikistan – Sh. Shabdolov, chairman of the Communist Party of Tajikistan "expressed heartfelt condolences to the Korean people and the C.C., the WPK on the demise of leader Kim Jong-il".
- United States – The Republican Party's presidential candidates issued several statements over the death of Kim. Former Massachusetts governor, Mitt Romney said in a statement that "Kim Jong-il was a ruthless tyrant who lived a life of luxury while the North Korean people starved. He recklessly pursued nuclear weapons, sold nuclear and missile technology to other rogue regimes, and committed acts of military aggression against our ally South Korea. He will not be missed. His death represents an opportunity for America to work with our friends to turn North Korea off the treacherous course it is on and ensure security in the region". Similarly, former ambassador to the People's Republic of China, Jon Huntsman stated that "Kim Jong Il was a conscienceless tyrant. His death closes a tragic chapter for the people of North Korea and offers them the best opportunity to get on a path towards a more free and open society and political reform". Governor of Texas Rick Perry said that "The death of vicious dictator Kim Jong Il provides some cause for hope but does not automatically end the reign of inhumane tyranny he and his father constructed". He then also expressed hope that Kim's death would usher in "a peaceful transition from a grim dictatorship to a free Korea". The Workers World Party sent a message to the Korean Workers Party. It stated in part that "We here in “the belly of the beast” know how difficult the US imperialist rulers have made it for leaders of truly sovereign countries to defend their sovereignty while pursuing the socialist path of development". The US Marxist-Leninist Organization also sent condolences, stating that the work and stands of Kim and the KWP "vital contributions not only to the Korean people but all the world’s peoples...The untimely passing of Kim Jong Il is a great loss to the world anti-imperialist and democratic forces and the world communist movement". The Workers Party, USA sent a message of condolence stating "We remember with great respect the life of Kim Jong Il who fought unsparingly to his last breath for the cause of peace, national independence and social progress. Kim Jong Il led the DPRK during a time in which U.S. imperialism maintained...a state of war against Korea and carried out all-around economic, political, diplomatic, cultural and military pressure against the DPRK in the north of Korea while occupying the south with tens of thousands of troops".
- Venezuela – A "mourning centre" was set up at the building of the Communist Party of Venezuela to receive condolences.
- Zimbabwe – Didymus Mutasa of the Zimbabwe African National Union – Patriotic Front, stated that Kim Jong Il "was a lovely man whom we associated with [and] He was our great friend, and we are not ashamed of being associated with him". He further stated "We got a lot of help from him as his country trained our army and they also built our Heroes Acre that we are very proud of. It was a very good relationship that we shall always cherish. We worked together well", However the leader of the Zimbabwe African Peoples Union, whose members were repressed by the North Korean trained Fifth Brigade said “We have no doubt that people with the Fifth Brigade background are the ones who continue to torture and kill Zanu-PF's political opponents even to this day, as such, the Korean dynasty is responsible for Zanu-PF's militant and violent approach to politics. Year 2011 is certainly a bad year for dictators. We pray that God also calls to heaven the few remaining ones". The larger faction of the Movement for Democratic Change – Tsvangirai stated that “Kim Jong- il killed our loved ones and now it is his time to meet his victims in the presence of God”, and a spokesperson for the larger faction added “his party won’t shed a tear for the North Korean dictator and he should rot in hell”.

== Financial markets ==
Asian stock markets fell soon after the announcement of Kim's death, echoing concerns about regional instability. At the opening of the European markets, stocks also fell, but Indonesian and United States stock markets rose after the announcement of Kim Jong Il's death.
