= Mohammed Saeed Bekheitan =

Syrian politician (1945–2022)

- محمد سعيد بخيتان

Assistant Regional Secretary of the Syrian Regional Branch
- In office 9 June 2005 – 8 July 2013
- Regional Secretary: Bashar al-Assad
- Preceded by: Sulayman Qaddah
- Succeeded by: Hilal Hilal

Director of the National Security Bureau of the Regional Command
- In office 21 June 2000 – 6 June 2005
- Regional Secretary: Bashar al-Assad
- Preceded by: Abd al-Rauf al-Qasem
- Succeeded by: Hisham Ikhtiyar

Member of the Regional Command of the Syrian Regional Branch
- In office 21 June 2000 – 8 July 2013

Governor of Hama
- In office 1993–2000
- Preceded by: Asaad Mustafa
- Succeeded by: ?

Personal details
- Born: 1945
- Died: 11 March 2022 (aged 76–77) Damascus, Syria
- Party: Ba'ath Party

Military service
- Allegiance: Ba'athist Syria
- Rank: General

Mohammed Saeed Bekheitan (Arabic: محمد سعيد بخيتان; 1945 – 11 March 2022) was a Syrian politician who was the Assistant Secretary of the Syrian Regional Command of the Ba'ath Party. He held the position from 2005 to 2013. He was a close associate of Syrian President Bashar al-Assad and his brother Maher al-Assad and was considered a senior decision-maker in the government.

== Biography ==
Bukheitan was a Sunni Muslim of Bedouin origins in Deir ez-Zor, a Sunni dominated region near the border with Iraq. He built his career in the police, eventually attaining the rank of general in the criminal security branch of the Ministry of Interior. From 1993 to 2000 he served as Governor of Hama, a major Sunni region in Syria. Since June 2000, he has been on the Regional Command of the Syrian Ba'ath Party. He headed the important National Security Bureau from 2000 to 2005 and since then has been the Assistant Secretary of the Syrian Regional Command of the Baath Party, the second highest position in the political party after the Syrian president.

Bekheitan was described by sources as an old guard Ba'athist who opposed reform efforts in Syria, even from inside the Ba'ath party. He was sanctioned by the European Union for "his senior decision making role in the repression of protesters participating in the Syrian Civil War". He died in Damascus on 11 March 2022.
