= Ba'ath Party (Syrian-dominated faction) =

Syrian-dominated faction of the Ba'ath party

Arab Socialist Ba'ath Party حزب البعث العربي الاشتراكي
- Governing body: Central Command (2018–2024)
- General Secretary: Bashar al-Assad (last)
- Assistant General Secretary: Ibrahim al-Hadid (last)
- Founded: 25 February 1966
- Dissolved: Syrian main branch: 29 January 2025 (other branches remain active)
- Split from: Ba'ath Party (unitary)
- Headquarters: Damascus, Syria (1966–2024)
- Newspaper: Ba'ath Message
- Ideology: Neo-Ba'athism; Assadism (from 1971); Arab nationalism; Arab socialism; Pan-Arabism; Anti-imperialism; Anti-Zionism; Qutriyun; Historical: Revolutionary socialism (1966–1970); Pan-Arabism of the Syrian branch of the Party (until 1970)
- Political position: Far-left
- International affiliation: Axis of Resistance
- Colors: Black, red, white and green (pan-Arab colors)
- Slogan: "Unity, Freedom, Socialism"

Party flag

The Arab Socialist Ba'ath Party (Arabic: حزب البعث العربي الاشتراكي, romanized: Ḥizb al-Ba‘th al-‘Arabī al-Ishtirākī; ba‘th meaning "resurrection"), also referred to as the pro-Syrian Ba'ath movement, is a neo-Ba'athist political party with branches across the Arab world. From 1970 until 2000, the party was led by the Syrian president and Secretary General Hafez al-Assad. Until 26 October 2018, leadership was shared between his son Bashar al-Assad (head of the Syrian regional organization) and Abdullah al-Ahmar (head of the pan-Arab national organization).

In 2018, after the reunification of the National and Regional Command, Bashar al-Assad became the Secretary General of the Central Command. The Syrian Regional Branch of the party was the largest organisation within the Syrian-led Ba'ath Party; it ruled Syria from the 1963 coup to the fall of the Assad regime in 2024. The Syrian Regional Branch's activities were indefinitely suspended on 11 December 2024 and its assets transferred to the caretaker government, dissolving the branch. On 29 January 2025, Military Operations Command spokesman Hassan Abdul Ghani announced the dissolution of the Syrian Regional Branch at the Syrian Revolution Victory Conference.

Other branches of the Syrian-dominated Ba'ath faction continued to operate, with the Palestinian branch As-Sa'iqa even resuming its activities inside Syria.

== Leadership ==
=== General Secretary ===
Hafez al-Assad became the Secretary of the Syrian Regional Command of the party in 1970 and Secretary General of the National Command in late 1970. Although he died in the year 2000, Hafez al-Assad continued to be named as the official Secretary General of the National Command. Bashar al-Assad became the Regional Secretary of the party in Syria after his father's death in 2000. In 2017, Bashar al-Assad was elected the Secretary General of the National Council.

No.	Portrait	Name (Lifespan)	Tenure		
No.	Portrait	Name (Lifespan)	Took office	Left office	Duration
1		Nureddin al-Atassi نور الدين الأتاسي (1929–1992)	March 1966	18 November 1970	4 years, 8 months
2		Hafez al-Assad حافظ الأسد (1930–2000)	12 September 1971	10 June 2000 #	28 years, 272 days
—		Abdullah al-Ahmar عبدالله الأحمر (born 1936) (ad interim)	10 June 2000	14 May 2017	16 years, 338 days
3		Bashar al-Assad بشار الأسد (born 1965)	18 May 2017	8 December 2024	7 years, 204 days

=== Assistant General Secretary ===
Abdullah al-Ahmar served as the Assistant Secretary General of the National Command, a post he has held since 1971 until 2018. Between 26 October 2018 and 8 May 2024, Hilal Hilal was an Assistant Secretary General of the Central Command. On 8 May 2024, Dr. Ibrahim al-Hadid was elected as the new Assistant Secretary of the Central Command.

No.	Portrait	Name (Lifespan)	Tenure		
No.	Portrait	Name (Lifespan)	Took office	Left office	Duration
1		Hafez al-Assad حافظ الأسد (1930–2000)	18 November 1970	17 November 1971	364 days
2		Abdullah al-Ahmar عبدالله الأحمر (born 1936)	17 November 1971	26 October 2018	46 years, 343 days
3		Hilal Hilal هلال هلال (born 1966)	26 October 2018	8 May 2024	5 years, 195 days
4		Ibrahim al-Hadid ابراهیم الحديد (born 1956)	8 May 2024	11 December 2024	217 days

=== Central Command ===
In 2018, Central Command of the Arab Socialist Ba'ath Party, was established through the merger of the National Command of the Arab Socialist Ba'ath Party and the Regional Command of the Syrian Regional Branch of the Arab Socialist Ba'ath Party.

=== National Council ===
At the 14th Conference of the Arab Socialist Ba'ath Party in 2017, the National Command, the party's leading organ since its inception, was abolished and replaced by the National Council. It was decided that the National Council would be composted of the regional secretaries of the regional branches of the Arab Socialist Ba'ath Party.

=== National Congresses ===
Note: for the 1st–8th National Congresses, see the national congresses held by the unified, pre-1966 Ba'ath Party.

- 9th National Congress (25–29 September 1966)
  - 9th Extraordinary National Congress (September 1967)
- 10th National Party Congress (October 1968)
  - 10th Extraordinary National Congress (October–November 1970)
- 11th National Congress (August 1971)
- 12th National Congress (July 1975)
- 13th National Congress (27 July – 2 August 1980)
- 14th National Congress (15–21 May 2017)

=== Organization ===
The 1963 National Congress of the Party in Damascus advocated a far-left posture; proclaiming the party as the vehicle for socialist revolution and building a socialist society. Key Marxist programmes such as worker's control of economic production and collectivizing of agricultural lands were adopted. The party is organized along Leninist lines, a policy stemming back to Aflaq and Bitar's leadership before the split. The highest organ of the party is the Party Congress. The Congress elects a General Secretary and a National Command. Under the National Command there is a Regional Command for each state in which the party operates. The regions are divided into branches, which are divided into companies. A branch consists of two or more companies. A company comprises three to seven cells. Each cell has between three and seven members.

In theory, the National Command of the party is the embryonic government for the entire Arab nation. The body comprises 21 members, half of whom are Syrian. In practice, the Syrian Regional Command is the more powerful institution inside the party. The Syrian Regional Command is the real political leadership in Syria; the power of the National Command has become more symbolic than real. A seat in National Command has become a sinecure, an honorary post given to Syrian politicians as they retire from active political life. Hafez al-Assad rarely had time to attend National Command meetings. Instead, he appointed Vice President for Party Affairs Zuhayr Masharqa or Abd al-Halim Khaddam to represent him at National Command meetings. In theory, the National Command could conduct proselytism and form new Regional Commands across the Arab world and support weaker Regional Commands, but Syrian policymakers have curtailed that capacity.

== Anthem ==
Arabic script

يا شباب العرب هيا وانطلق يا موكبي
وارفع الصوت قوياً عاش بعث العـرب
يا شباب العرب هيا وانطلق يا موكبي
وارفع الصوت قوياً عاش بعث العـرب

نحن فلاح وعامل وشباب لا يلين
نحن جندي مقاتل نحن صوت الكادحين
من جذور الأرض جئنا من صميم الألم
بالضحايا ما بخلنا بالعطاء الأكرم

يا شباب العرب هيا وانطلق يا موكبي
وارفع الصوت قوياً عاش بعث العـرب

خندق الثوار واحد أو يقال الظلم زال
صامد يا بعـث صامد أنت في ساح النضال
وحد الأحـرار هيا وحد الشعب العظـيم
وامض يا بعث قوياً للغد الحر الكريم

يا شباب العرب هيا وانطلق يا موكبي
وارفع الصوت قوياً عاش بعث العـرب

Arabic transliteration

ya šabāba-l'arbi hayyā wanṭaliq yā mawkibī
warfa'i-ṣṣawta qawiyān 'aša Ba'athu-l'arabi
ya šabāba-l'arbi hayyā wanṭaliq yā mawkibī
warfa'i-ṣṣawta qawiyān 'aša Ba'athu-l'arabi

naḥnu fallaḥu wa'āmil washabābu-lla yalīn
naḥnu jundi yun muqātil naḥnu sawtu-lkādaḥin
min juðūri-l'Arḍi ji.nā min samimi-l-alami
bī-ḍḍaḥāyā mā bakhilnā bi-l'aṭā il'akrami

ya šabāba-l'arbi hayyā wanṭaliq yā mawkibī
warfa'i-ṣṣawta qawiyān 'aša Ba'athu-l'arabi

khandaqu-ththuwwāri wāḥid .aw yuqāla-ẓẓulmu zāl
ṣāmidun ya Ba'athu ṣāmid .anta fī sāḥi-nniḍāl
waḥidi-l.aḥrara hayyā waḥidi-shsha'aba-l'aẓīm
wāmḍi yā Ba'athu qawiyyān lilġadi-lḥurri-lkarīm

ya šabāba-l'arbi hayyā wanṭaliq yā mawkibī
warfa'i-ṣṣawta qawiyān 'aša Ba'athu-l'arabi

English translation

Arab youth, raise and march to fight your enemies,
Raise your voice: "Long live the Arab Ba'ath!"
Arab youth, raise and march to fight your enemies,
Raise your voice: "Long live the Arab Ba'ath!"

We are farmers, workers and persistent youth,
We are soldiers, we are the voice of labourers,
We came from roots of this land and pain from hearts,
We weren't misers in giving sacrifice nobly.

Arab youth, raise and march to fight your enemies,
Raise your voice: "Long live the Arab Ba'ath!"

All revolutionaries into the trenches, there's still injustice,
The Ba'ath will never surrender and stop struggling.
Go Ba'ath. Unite all revolutionaries, unite all great people,
Go strong for tomorrow in freedom and dignity.

Arab youth, raise and march to fight your enemies,
Raise your voice: "Long live the Arab Ba'ath!"

== Branches by region ==
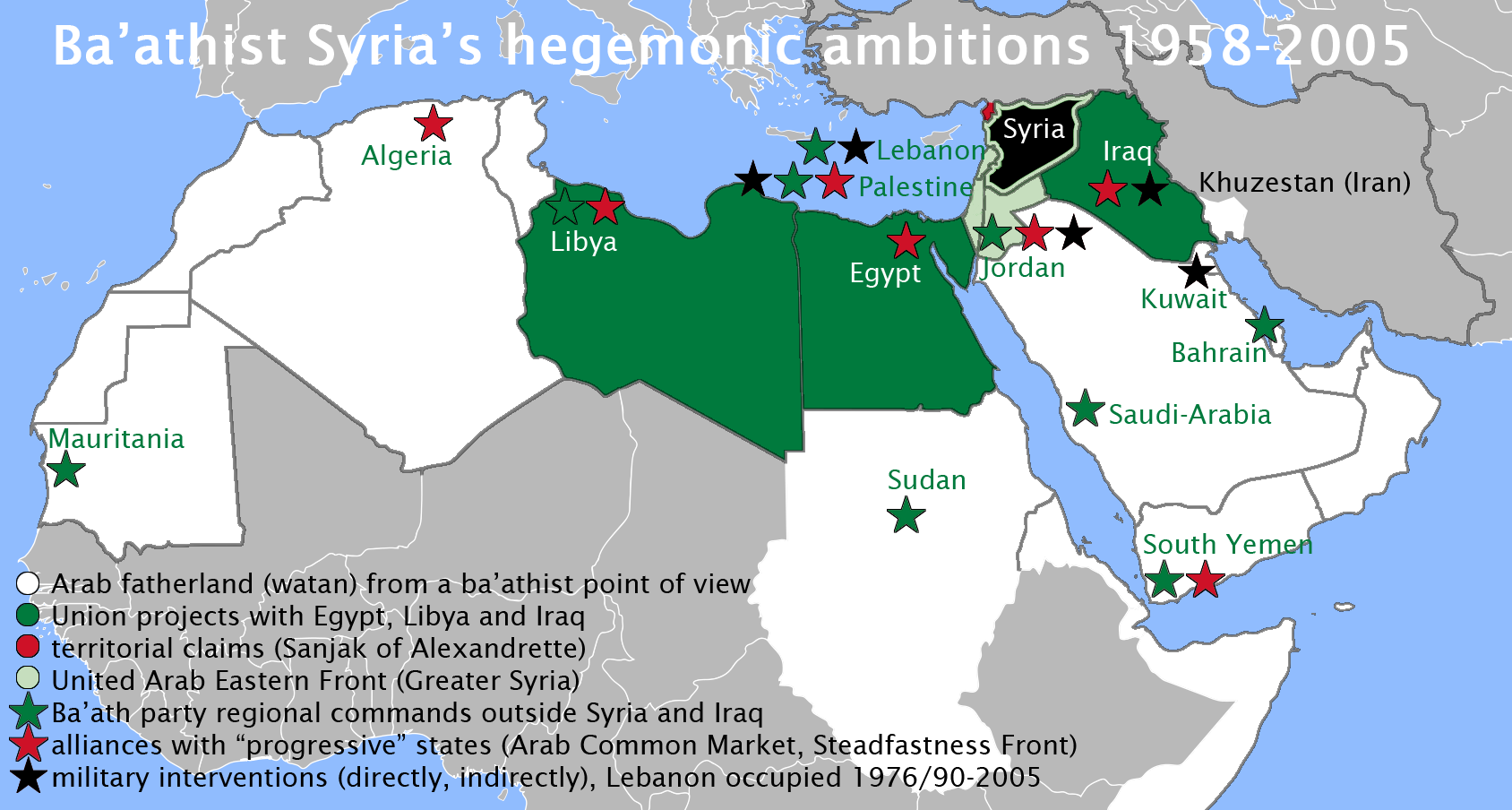
Ba'athist Syria's hegemonic ambitions between 1958 and 2005.

=== Iraq ===
Iraqi branch
- Regional Secretary: Mouteb Shenan
- Assistant Regional Secretary: Mahmud Rashad Al-Shaykh Radhi
- Founded: 1966

The party was sometimes known in Iraq as left-wing Ba'ath or Qutr Al-Iraq. Prominent members of the party in Iraq include Mahmud Rashad Al-Shaykh Radhi, Fawzi Mutlaq al-Rawi and Dr. Mahmud Shamsa. The party opposed the rule of Saddam Hussein and was one of the first groups to be targeted by him. The party lost hundreds of its cadres amid repression by his government. Radhi was based in Syria during the 1970s.

The party labelled the Saddam government as "fascist". When the Iran–Iraq War broke out in 1980, the party took part in the formation of the Iraqi Patriotic and Democratic Front, together with the Iraqi Communist Party, the Patriotic Union of Kurdistan and the Kurdish Socialist Party. The front vowed to overthrow Saddam. (Syria supported Iran in the Iraq-Iran War.)

In the 1980s, the party began cooperating with the Islamic Supreme Council of Iraq. The party organized the first general conference of Iraqi opposition groups in Damascus in 1989. It also participated in a conference of Iraqi opposition groups in Beirut in 1991. In 1999, Radhi was staying in the United Kingdom. The party was one of three main groups (along with the Iraqi Communist Party and the Islamic Dawa Party) which formed the Coalition of Iraqi National Forces. The Coalition was opposed to Saddam Hussein as well as United States military intervention. During the run-up to the 2003 invasion of Iraq, the party publicly denounced U.S. involvement in the organization of Iraqi dissidents in exile.

After the fall of Saddam's administration, confusion arose as to whether the de-Ba'athification law also applied to the party. In 2008, Radhi requested that the party be allowed to function inside Iraq and join the process of reconciliation. In response, the Iraqi government declared that they viewed Qotr al-Iraq as distinct from Saddam's Ba'ath because Qotr al-Iraq had participated in the opposition conferences during the Saddam years. As of 2009, the Iraqi regional organization is still based in Syria.

In 2018 Radhi, based in London, visited Baghdad and met President Fuad Masum during reconciliation talks.

=== Jordan ===
The Arab Ba'ath Progressive Party was legally registered for the first time in 1993. The branch is small, and has, according to a leaked diplomatic cable, a "minuscule number of adherents". Despite its small size, the branch is able through its leader, Fuad Dabbour, to get a decent footprint in Jordanian media. Dabbour's fiery statements on foreign policy are frequently quoted by the press. The party is less known than its pro-Iraqi counterpart, the Arab Socialist Ba'ath Party. It is the party branch of the Syrian-dominated Ba'ath Party in Jordan. Fuad Dabbour is the branch's Regional Secretary. It is believed that the party has fewer than 200 members.

Regional Secretaries

- Mahmood Ma'ayteh
- Fuad Dabbour

=== Lebanon ===
The Lebanese branch was established in 1966, the year of the Ba'ath Party split. During the Lebanese Civil War, the party had an armed militia called the Assad Battalion. The party joined forces with Kamal Jumblatt's Progressive Socialist Party in organizing the National Democratic Movement, seeking to abolish the confessional state. The National Democratic Movement was superseded by the National Democratic Front, in which the party participated. The party organized resistance against Israeli forces in Lebanon. In July 1987, it took part in forming the Unification and Liberation Front.

In the 2009 parliamentary election, the party won two seats as part of the March 8 Alliance. The parliamentarians of the party are Assem Qanso and Qassem Hashem. Wael Nader al-Halqi, the Prime Minister of Syria, praised the Lebanon Regional Branch leadership, stating that they supported the Syrian leadership and stayed loyal to the Assads despite the Syrian occupation of Lebanon and in times of conspiracies and attacks. Since 2018, party is along the Amal Movement part of Development and Liberation parliamentary bloc. As of 2023, the leader of the party is Ali Hijazi. In the 2022 parliamentary election, the party won one seat.

On 12 December 2025, the head of the party, Ali Hijazi, announced that the party had changed its name to the "National Banner Party", and said that he would submit an official request to the Lebanese government to formally change the party's name.

However, some people, including Assem Qanso, refused to change the party name and split into a separate party called the Arab Socialist Ba'ath Party – Lebanon region.

=== Mauritania ===
A secret Syrian branch was established in Mauritania in 1981. The party was founded on 20 September 1994 by a mixture of Arab nationalists and members of a secret Ba'ath party association in Mauritania. The party won a seat in the 19 November and 3 December 2006 elections. In the 2013 election, the party lost its seat. In the most recent elections in 2018, the party received only 0.31% of the vote.

As of 2013, the party is led by Mahfouz Weld al-Azizi. The party has strongly supported the Syrian government throughout the Syrian civil war.

=== Palestine ===
Palestinian Samir al-Attari was a member of the National Command in the 1970s. Until 1970, as-Saiqa remained under the control of Jadid. Following the outbreak of the Syrian Civil War in 2011, as-Sa'iqa took up arms in support of the Syrian Ba'athist government, participating in numerous military operations such as the Southern Damascus offensive (April–May 2018). After the fall of the Assad regime, as-Saiqa was allowed to resume its political activities by the new Syrian government and reopen its offices in Syria.

As-Sa'iqa Secretary-General

- Zuheir Mohsen (1971–1979; he was also a member of the National Command)
- Isam al-Qadi (1979–2006)
- Farhan Abu Al-Hayja (2007–2018)
- Mohammed Qeis (2018–present)

Regional Secretaries

- Farhan Abulhaija (?–?)

=== Sudan ===
During the 1980s, the party was called Arab Socialist Ba'ath Party – Organization of Sudan (differentiating it from the pro-Iraqi party, called Arab Socialist Ba'ath Party – Country of Sudan). The party participated in the 1986 election as part of the Progressive National Front.

The party held its third regional congress in Khartoum on February 5–6, 2009. The congress elected a 23-member Central Committee, an 11-member Regional Command and a regional secretary (Altijani Mustafa Yassin). The congress stated that the party sought cooperation with the National Congress Party for the sake of forming a national front. The party staunchly opposed independence of South Sudan. It was reported in 2010 that Ahmad Alahmad, the Secretary General of the Arab Socialist Movement, was a member of the Sudanese regional leadership.

Regional Secretaries

- Altijani Mustafa Yassin

=== Syria ===
The logo of the Syrian branch organization

The party slogan "Unity, Freedom, Socialism" was enshrined in the Constitution of the Syrian Arab Republic. The eighth article of the Constitution stipulated that "[t]he leading party in the society and the state is the ... Ba'ath Party. It leads the National Progressive Front seeking to unify the resources of the masses of the people and place them at the service of the goals of the Arab nation". The Constitution was adopted in 1973. As per the Constitution of the Syrian Arab Republic, it is the Regional Command of the party that nominates the candidate for president of the republic. The Constitution does not explicitly say that the president has to be the leader of the party, but the National Progressive Front (NPF) charter states that president of the Syrian Arab Republic and the secretary of the party is also the president of the NPF.

The party has dominated the Syrian parliament since 1963. The party leads the National Progressive Front and in all elections conducted under this constitution has obtained the majority of the 167 parliamentary seats reserved for the Front. In the 2003 parliamentary election, the party secured 135 of the seats. As of the mid-2000s, the party membership in Syria was estimated at 800,000. Key party organs in Syria are Al-Ba'ath and Al-Thawra. Due to the party's focus on intellectuals and affluent elites, it failed to gain support from the economically weaker sections such as the urban workers and rural farmers. As a result, its support base was vastly limited to affluent merchant classes of Damascus and the Alawite clans in the North-Western coast.

The Syrian Regional Command has 21 members. As of 1987, the Syrian Regional Command comprised the three vice presidents of the Syrian Arab Republic, the Prime Minister, the Minister of Defense, the Chief of Staff of the Armed Forces, the parliamentary speaker, the Aleppo and Hama party secretaries as well as the heads of the party bureaus for trade unions, economy and higher education.

The seventh Syrian regional party congress was held in January 1980. The congress created a new institution, the Central Committee, to act as an intermediary body between the Regional Command and local branches. The Central Committee had 75 members. The eighth regional congress decided to expand the Central Committee to 95 members. The Central Committee was charged with electing the Regional Command, which previously had been done by the regional congress delegates. The Central Committee represents the regional congress when the congress is not in session.

The party has 19 branches in Syria: one in each of the thirteen provinces: one in Damascus, one in Aleppo and one at each of the four universities. In most cases, the governor of a province, police chief, mayor and other local dignitaries make up the Branch Command, but the Branch Command Secretary and other executive positions are filled by party whole-timers.

The Syrian regional party congress is held every four years. While it is a strictly orchestrated affair, the regional congress has been a venue for actual debates on current affairs. Criticism against corruption and economic stagnation were expressed at the 1985 regional congress, albeit candidly. This congress was attended by 771 branch delegates.

The party has a parallel structure within the Syrian armed forces. The military and civilian sectors only meet at the regional level, as the military sector is represented in the Regional Command and sends delegates to regional congresses. The military sector is divided into branches, operating at the battalion level. The head of a military party branch is called a tawjihi ("guide").

The party has an Control and Inspection Committee, instituted in 1980. The Party Security Law was passed in 1979, criminalizing "deviations" inside the party and attacks on the party.

The party has three bureaus for coordinating work in mass organizations: the Popular Organizations Bureau (coordinating the People's Army militia, the Revolutionary Youth Union, Students Union and the General Union of Syrian Women); the Workers Bureau (coordinating the General Federation of Trade Unions); and the Peasants Bureau (coordinating the Peasants Federation). Children joined the Vanguards, an organization for grade-school boys and girls. Vanguards attended paramilitary summer camps operated by the armed forces. In the mid-1970s, the party ran a mass campaign for the mobilization of peasants into the Peasants Federation.

The party has its own system of political education, including the Higher Political Institute (a graduate school of the University of Damascus).

Abdul Halim Khaddam resigned as National Command and Central Committee member in mid-2005.

=== Tunisia ===
There is no formal structure linked to the Damascus-based Ba'ath Party. Most Ba'athists in Tunisia support the Iraqi faction as members of the Ba'ath Movement or the more leftist and radical the Party of the Arab and Democratic Vanguard. Only a small number of militants headed by Mohamed Salah Hermassi (a member of the Damascus-based National Command) are historically linked to Damascus.

=== Yemen ===
The People's Vanguard Party was the Ba'ath Party's Branch in Yemen. The party was established in the late 1950s. When the Baath Party was divided between Syrian and Iraqi factions, the Yemeni branch overwhelmingly sided with the Syrian-led Ba'ath Party. The assistant regional secretary of the party in Yemen was Mohammed Al-Zubairy. The party ran in the 1993 parliamentary election, winning seven seats. In the 1997 and 2003 parliamentary elections, the party won two seats. In 2003, the party got 0.66% of the national vote. The party supported Ali Abdullah Saleh in the 1999 presidential election.

Abdullah al-Ahmar led a central party delegation to the 4th Regional Congress of the Yemenite Ba'ath in 2006.

In December 2008, the party and the National Arab Socialist Ba'ath Party agreed to coordinate their political activities.

In November 2010, one of the key leaders of the party in Yemen, Ali Ahmad Nasser al-Dhahab, died. He had been assistant secretary of the Regional Command and a Member of Parliament since 1993.

In March 2013, Linda Mohammed, the head of the region's Women section, left the party in protest at the Yemenite leadership's continued support for Bashar al-Assad and the Syrian Ba'ath.

Regional Secretaries

- Unknown
- Mahmoud Abdul-Wahab Abdul-Hamid (?–?)
- Quasim Salaam (?–present)

Assistant Regional Secretaries

- Ali Ahmad Nasser al-Dhahab (1993 – November 30, 2010)
- Ahmad Haidar (?–?)
- Mohammed Al-Zubairy (?-?)
