= Central Command of the Arab Socialist Ba'ath Party – Syria Region =

Ruling organ of the Syrian Ba'athist party and of the Syrian-led Ba'athist movement

The Central Command of the Arab Socialist Ba'ath Party (Arabic: القيادة المركزية لحزب البعث العربي الاشتراكي), which was established through the merger of the National Command of the Arab Socialist Ba'ath Party and the Regional Command of the Syrian Regional Branch of the Arab Socialist Ba'ath Party in 2018, was the ruling organ of the Ba'ath Party organization in Syria and the Syrian-led Ba'athist movement. Its predecessor, the Regional Command, stems from Ba'athist ideology, where region literally means an Arab state. Until 2012, according to the Syrian Constitution of 1973, the Central Command had the power to nominate a candidate for President. While the constitution did not state that the Secretary-General of the Central Command was the President of Syria, the charter of the National Progressive Front (NPF), of which the Ba'ath Party was a member, stated that the President and the Secretary-General was the NPF President, but this was not stated in any legal document.

The 1st Extraordinary Regional Congress held in 1964 decided that the Secretary-General of the Central Command would also be head of state. Amin al-Hafiz, the incumbent secretary, became head of state and retained his post as Prime Minister. At the 2nd Regional Congress in 1965, the Military Committee weakened the powers of the National Command by passing a resolution that the Regional Secretary of the Regional Command was ex officio head of state. The secretariat was given the powers to appoint the Prime Minister, the cabinet, the commander-in-chief and the leading military commanders.

Before the 1970 Corrective Movement that brought Hafez al-Assad to power, the local party leadership was elected by fellow Ba'ath Party members; when al-Assad came to power the Central Command began to appoint all party officials. Under Bashar al-Assad this policy was reversed, and party members were again able to elect the local party leadership, but candidates had to be approved by the party leadership.

The Central Command was officially responsible to the Regional Congress. The Central Command was supposed to be subordinate to the National Command, and official media portrayed it as such to stress the government's commitment to Ba'athist ideology. Since Hafez al-Assad's rise to power, the National Command was subordinate to the Central Command. Before the schism between the Military Committee led by Salah Jadid and the Aflaqites, and the ensuing 1966 coup d'état, the National Command was the leading party organ. The Central Command was the most powerful institution in Ba'athist Syria.

The Secretary-General chaired all the meetings of the Central Command. If the Secretary-General is absent, the Assistant Secretary-General substitutes him. The Assistant Secretary-General sets the agenda for the meeting, with consultation of the Secretary-General. Under Bashar al-Assad a degree of openness was permitted in Central Command meetings. Members were allowed to discuss each sides of complex issues and members could criticize certain policies and how they are implemented. However, if Bashar al-Assad supported a side, that side will prevail in the argument. In contrast to his father, Hafez, who consulted with the Central Command and took their views into account before he made a decision, the Central Command under Bashar al-Assad increasingly became a rubber stamp body.

Following the fall of the Ba'athist regime, on 11 December 2024, the Ba'ath Party suspended all its activities indefinitely and transferred its assets to the Syrian state, effectively dissolving the party.

== Heads and bureaux ==
Heads

No.	Portrait	Name (Lifespan)	Tenure		
No.	Portrait	Name (Lifespan)	Took office	Left office	Duration
Regional Secretary of the Regional Command
1		Hammud al-Shufi حمود الشوفي (1935–2011)	5 September 1963	1 February 1964	149 days
2		Shibli al-Aysami شبلي العيسمي (1925–2011)	5 February 1964	4 October 1964	242 days
3		Amin al-Hafiz أمين الحافظ (1921–2009)	4 October 1964	19 December 1965	1 year, 76 days
Regional Command dissolved (19 December 1965 – 27 March 1966)
4		Nureddin al-Atassi نور الدين الأتاسي (1929–1992)	27 March 1966	13 November 1970	4 years, 231 days
5		Hafez al-Assad حافظ الأسد (1930–2000)	18 November 1970	10 June 2000 #	29 years, 205 days
6		Bashar al-Assad بشار الأسد (born 1965)	24 June 2000	26 October 2018	18 years, 124 days
General Secretary of the Central Command
(6)		Bashar al-Assad بشار الأسد (born 1965)	26 October 2018	8 December 2024	6 years, 43 days

Deputy heads

No.	Portrait	Name (Lifespan)	Tenure		
No.	Portrait	Name (Lifespan)	Took office	Left office	Duration
Assistant Regional Secretary of the Regional Command
1		Fahmu al-Ashuri فهمو العاشوري	1 February 1964	17 March 1965	1 year, 44 days
2		Muhammad az-Zubi محمد الزوبي	17 March 1965	1 August 1965	137 days
3		Salah Jadid صلاح جديد (1926–1993)	1 August 1965	13 November 1970	5 years, 104 days
4		Mohamad Jaber Bajbouj محمد جابر بجبوج	18 November 1970	7 January 1980	9 years, 50 days
5		Zuhair Masharqa زهير مشارقة (1938–2007)	7 January 1980	20 January 1985	5 years, 13 days
6		Sulayman Qaddah سليمان قداح	20 January 1985	9 June 2005	20 years, 140 days
7		Mohammed Saeed Bekheitan محمد سعيد بخيتان (1945–2022)	9 June 2005	8 July 2013	8 years, 29 days
8		Hilal Hilal هلال هلال (born 1966)	10 July 2013	26 October 2018	5 years, 108 days
Assistant General Secretary of the Central Command
(8)		Hilal Hilal هلال هلال (born 1966)	26 October 2018	8 May 2024	5 years, 195 days
9		Ibrahim al-Hadid ابراهیم الحديد (born 1956)	8 May 2024	11 December 2024	217 days

Bureaus of the Central Command

- Bureau of the Secretariat
- Control and Inspection Committee (since 2023)
- National Security Bureau
- Organization Bureau
- Preparation Bureau
- Military Bureau (also known as the "Military Committee")
- Bureau of Education and Scouts
- Bureau of Peasants
- Finance Bureau
- Legal Bureau
- National Economy Bureau
- Bureau of Students
- Bureau of Youth and Sport
- Bureau of High Education and Scientific Research
- Bureau of Professional
- Bureau of Workers

=== Timeline ===
Heads

Deputy heads

== Members ==
Only members who were elected to the Regional Command at the 1st Regional Congress (held on 5 September 1963) and after are included in this list. The Syrian Regional Branch was dissolved in 1958 (and is therefore considered as a distinct entity by the Syrian Regional Branch itself) so that Syria, with Egypt, could establish the United Arab Republic. The Syrian Regional Branch was officially reestablished on 5 September 1963.

Members of the 1st–11th Regional (Central) Commands
Name	Took office	Left office	Term(s)	Duration
Hammud al-Shufi	5 September 1963	1 February 1964	1	149 days
Khalid al-Hakim	5 September 1963	1 February 1964	1	149 days
Nureddin al-Atassi	5 September 1963	19 December 1965	4	2 years, 105 days
Nureddin al-Atassi	27 March 1966	13 November 1970	4	4 years, 231 days
Mahmüd Nawfal	5 September 1963	1 February 1964	1	149 days
Ahmad Abü Sälih	5 September 1963	1 February 1964	1	149 days
Hamad Ubayd	5 September 1963	19 December 1965	4	167 days
Hafez al-Assad	5 September 1963	4 April 1965	4	1 year, 211 days
Hafez al-Assad	27 March 1966	10 June 2000	8	34 years, 75 days
Muhammad Rabbäh al-Tawil	5 September 1963	19 December 1965	4	2 years, 105 days
Muhammad Rabbäh al-Tawil	27 March 1966	13 November 1970	4	4 years, 231 days
Amin al-Hafiz	1 February 1964	19 December 1965	3	2 years, 321 days
Salah Jadid	1 February 1964	19 December 1965	4	1 year, 321 days
Salah Jadid	27 March 1966	13 November 1970	4	4 years, 231 days
Shibli Aysami	1 February 1964	17 March 1965	1	1 year, 44 days
Muhammad Umran	1 February 1964	4 April 1965	1	1 year, 62 days
Abd al-Karim al-Jundi	1 February 1964	4 April 1965	1	1 year, 62 days
Abd al-Karim al-Jundi	1 August 1965	19 December 1965	1	140 days
Abd al-Karim al-Jundi	27 March 1966	31 March 1969	3	3 years, 4 days
Fahmi al-Ashuri	1 February 1964	4 April 1965	1	1 year, 62 days
Sulaymän al-Ali	1 February 1964	4 April 1965	1	1 year, 62 days
Muhammad az-Zubi	1 February 1964	19 December 1965	3	1 year, 321 days
Muhammad az-Zubi	27 March 1966	September 1966	1	158 days
Sami al-Jundi	1 February 1964	4 April 1965	1	1 year, 62 days
Jamil Shiyya	1 February 1964	19 December 1965	3	1 year, 321 days
Jamil Shiyya	27 March 1966	September 1966	1	158 days
Yusuf Zuaiyin	1 February 1964	19 December 1965	3	1 year, 312 days
Yusuf Zuaiyin	27 March 1966	13 November 1970	4	4 years, 231 days
Mahmud aj-Jayyush	1 February 1964	4 April 1965	1	1 year, 62 days
al-Walid Taleb	1 February 1964	4 April 1965	1	1 year, 62 days
Habïb Hadäd	4 April 1965	1 August 1965	1	119 days
Habïb Hadäd	27 March 1966	13 November 1970	4	4 years, 231 days
Mustafa Rustum	1 February 1964	4 April 1965	1	1 year, 303 days
Mustafa Rustum	27 March 1966	28 September 1968	3	2 years, 185 days
Mustafa Rustum	31 March 1969	13 November 1970	1	1 year, 227 days
Adesän Shümän	4 April 1965	1 August 1965	1	119 days
Mustafa Tlass	1 August 1965	19 December 1965	1	140 days
Mustafa Tlass	28 September 1968	9 June 2005	9	36 years, 251 days
Salim Hatum	1 August 1965	19 December 1965	1	140 days
Muhammad Id Ashawi	1 August 1965	19 December 1965	1	140 days
Muhammad Id Ashawi	27 March 1966	31 March 1969	4	3 years, 4 days
Marwan Habash	1 August 1965	19 December 1965	1	140 days
Marwan Habash	27 March 1966	13 November 1970	4	4 years, 231 days
Fayiz al-Jüsem	1 August 1965	19 December 1965	1	140 days
Fayiz al-Jüsem	27 March 1966	28 September 1968	3	2 years, 185 days
Hisäm Hayzah	1 August 1965	19 December 1965	1	140 days
Ahmad Suwaydini	27 March 1966	February 1968	2	2 years, 185 days
Kämel Husayn	27 March 1966	September 1966	1	158 days
Brahim Makhous	27 March 1966	13 November 1970	4	4 years, 231 days
Abdul Hamid al-Miqdad	September 1966	13 November 1970	3	4 years, 73 days
Hadithad Muräd	September 1966	13 November 1970	3	4 years, 46 days
Muhammad Said Taleb	September 1966	13 November 1970	3	4 years, 73 days
Adel Naysah	28 September 1968	31 March 1969	1	184 days
Hamüd al-Qabbani	28 September 1968	13 November 1970	2	2 years, 46 days
Ahmad Shaykh Qasim	31 March 1969	13 November 1970	1	1 year, 227 days
Anis Kanju	31 March 1969	13 November 1970	1	1 year, 227 days
Abdel Ghanf Ibrahim	13 November 1970	7 January 1980	3	9 years, 18 days
Naji Jamil	13 November 1970	March 1978	2	7 years, 108 days
Abdul Rahman Khleifawi	13 November 1970	7 January 1980	3	9 years, 18 days
Abdul Halim Khaddam	13 November 1970	9 June 2005	6	34 years, 208 days
Abdullah al-Ahmar	13 November 1970	9 June 2005	6	34 years, 208 days
Muhammad Ali al-Halabi	13 November 1970	7 January 1980	3	9 years, 18 days
Mahmoud al-Ayyubi	13 November 1970	15 April 1975	2	4 years, 153 days
Mahmoud al-Ayyubi	7 January 1980	20 January 1985	1	5 years, 50 days
Muhammad Haydar	13 November 1970	August 1975	2	4 years, 261 days
Ahmad al-Khatib	13 November 1970	15 April 1975	2	4 years, 153 days
Muhammad Täleb Hilal	13 November 1970	14 May 1971	1	182 days
Daud ar-Raddäwi	13 November 1970	14 May 1971	1	182 days
Fahmi al-Yuxufi	13 November 1970	7 January 1980	3	9 years, 18 days
Abdul Karim Adl	13 November 1970	15 April 1975	2	4 years, 153 days
Mohamad Jaber Bajbouj	14 May 1971	7 January 1980	2	8 years, 201 days
Jabe al-Kafri	14 May 1971	15 April 1975	1	3 years, 336 days
Abdallah al-Ahmad	14 May 1971	7 January 1980	2	8 years, 201 days
Muib Shnän	14 May 1971	7 January 1980	2	8 years, 201 days
George Sanddiqni	14 May 1971	7 January 1980	2	8 years, 201 days
Adib Milhim	14 May 1971	15 April 1975	1	3 years, 336 days
Isam an-Naib	14 May 1971	15 April 1975	1	3 years, 336 days
Taha al-Khayrat	14 May 1971	7 January 1980	2	8 years, 201 days
Zuhair Mushariqa	15 April 1975	9 June 2005	3	30 years, 55 days
Rifaat al-Assad	15 April 1975	8 February 1998	3	22 years, 299 days
Ahmad Diyab	15 April 1975	20 January 1985	2	9 years, 280 days
Mahmüd Hadid	15 April 1975	7 January 1980	1	4 years, 230 days
Yüsuf al-Assad	15 April 1975	7 January 1980	1	4 years, 230 days
Ahmad al-Hasan	15 April 1975	7 January 1980	1	4 years, 230 days
Nahïb Hassün	15 April 1975	7 January 1980	1	4 years, 230 days
Ahmad Iskandar Ahmad	7 January 1980	29 December 1983	1	4 years, 28 days
Hikmat al-Shihabi	7 January 1980	July 1998	2	18 years, 212 days
Nasruddin Nasir	7 January 1980	20 January 1985	1	5 years, 50 days
Abd al-Qadir Qaddura	7 January 1980	9 June 2005	3	25 years, 190 days
Walid Hamdun	7 January 1980	9 June 2005	3	25 years, 190 days
Tawfiq Salah	7 January 1980	21 June 2000	2	20 years, 203 days
Izzuddin Nasir	7 January 1980	21 June 2000	2	20 years, 203 days
Mahmoud Zuabi	7 January 1980	21 June 2000	2	20 years, 203 days
Said Hamadi	7 January 1980	21 June 2000	2	20 years, 203 days
Wahib Tannus	7 January 1980	21 June 2000	2	20 years, 203 days
Abdul Rauf al-Kasm	7 January 1980	21 June 2000	2	20 years, 203 days
Ilyas al-Lati	7 January 1980	20 January 1985	1	5 years, 50 days
Sulayman Qaddah	7 January 1980	9 June 2005	2	25 years, 190 days
Ahmad Qabalan	7 January 1980	21 June 2000	1	20 years, 203 days
Abd al-Razzaq Ayyoub	20 January 1985	21 June 2000	1	15 years, 153 days
Ahmad Dargham	20 January 1985	9 June 2005	2	20 years, 140 days
Fayez Nasir	20 January 1985	9 June 2005	2	20 years, 140 days
Rashid Akhtarini	20 January 1985	21 June 2000	1	15 years, 153 days
Bashar al-Assad	21 June 2000	11 December 2024	2	24 years, 170 days
Muhammad Mustafa Mero	21 June 2000	9 June 2005	1	5 years, 0 days
Muhammad Naji al-Otari	21 June 2000	8 July 2013	2	13 years, 17 days
Farouk al-Sharaa	21 June 2000	8 July 2013	2	13 years, 17 days
Salim Said Yasin	21 June 2000	8 December 2001	1	1 year, 170 days
Ibrahim Hneidi	21 June 2000	9 June 2005	1	5 years, 0 days
Faruq Abu Shamat	21 June 2000	9 June 2005	1	5 years, 0 days
Ghiyab Barakat	21 June 2000	9 June 2005	1	5 years, 0 days
Walid al-Bouz	21 June 2000	9 June 2005	1	5 years, 0 days
Mohammad al-Hussein	21 June 2000	8 July 2013	2	13 years, 17 days
Majed Shaddoud	21 June 2000	9 June 2005	1	5 years, 0 days
Mohammed Saeed Bekheitan	21 June 2000	8 July 2013	2	13 years, 17 days
Hassan Turkmani	9 June 2005	18 July 2012	1	8 years, 29 days
Hisham Ikhtiyar	9 June 2005	20 July 2012	1	8 years, 29 days
Osama bin Hamed Adi	9 June 2005	8 July 2013	1	8 years, 29 days
Yasser Tawfiq Hourieh	9 June 2005	8 July 2013	1	8 years, 29 days
Bassam Janbieh	9 June 2005	8 July 2013	1	8 years, 29 days
Said Daoud Eliya	9 June 2005	8 July 2013	1	8 years, 29 days
Haitham Satayhi	9 June 2005	8 July 2013	1	8 years, 29 days
Shahinaz Fakoush	9 June 2005	8 July 2013	1	8 years, 29 days
Wael Nader al-Halqi	8 July 2013	3 July 2016	1	2 years, 361 days
Mohammad Jihad al-Laham	8 July 2013	6 June 2016	1	2 years, 334 days
Mohamad Ammar Sa'ati	8 July 2013	22 April 2017	1	3 years, 288 days
Imad Khamis	8 July 2013	22 April 2017	1	3 years, 288 days
Mohammad Shaaban Azzouz	8 July 2013	4 May 2024	2	10 years, 301 days
Hilal Hilal	8 July 2013	8 May 2024	3	10 years, 305 days
Abdul-Nasser Shafi	8 July 2013	22 April 2017	1	3 years, 288 days
Abdul-Mo'ti al-Mashlab	8 July 2013	22 April 2017	1	3 years, 288 days
Fairouz Moussa	8 July 2013	22 April 2017	1	3 years, 288 days
Rakan al-Shoufi	8 July 2013	22 April 2017	1	3 years, 288 days
Youssef al-Ahmad	8 July 2013	22 April 2017	1	3 years, 288 days
Najm al-Ahmad	8 July 2013	22 April 2017	1	3 years, 288 days
Khalaf al-Miftah	8 July 2013	22 April 2017	1	3 years, 288 days
Malek Ali	8 July 2013	22 April 2017	1	3 years, 288 days
Hussein Arnous	8 July 2013	11 December 2024	3	13 years, 60 days
Hadiya Khalaf Abbas	22 April 2017	13 November 2021	1	4 years, 205 days
Fahd Jassem al-Freij	22 April 2017	4 May 2024	1	7 years, 12 days
Muhsen Bilal	22 April 2017	4 May 2024	1	7 years, 12 days
Mahdi Dakhlallah	22 April 2017	4 May 2024	1	7 years, 12 days
Huda al-Homsi	22 April 2017	4 May 2024	1	7 years, 12 days
Yasser al-Shoufi	22 April 2017	4 May 2024	1	7 years, 12 days
Ammar Sibali	22 April 2017	4 May 2024	1	7 years, 12 days
Hammouda Sabbagh	22 April 2017	11 December 2024	2	7 years, 233 days
Ali Mahmoud Abbas	4 May 2024	11 December 2024	1	221 days
Safwan Abu Saada	4 May 2024	11 December 2024	1	221 days
Izzat Arabi Katbi	4 May 2024	11 December 2024	1	221 days
Mahmoud Zanuboua	4 May 2024	11 December 2024	1	221 days
Ibrahim al-Hadid	4 May 2024	11 December 2024	1	221 days
Fadel Najjar	4 May 2024	11 December 2024	1	221 days
Ayman al-Daqqaq	4 May 2024	11 December 2024	1	221 days
Taha Khalifa	4 May 2024	11 December 2024	1	221 days
Samir Khadr	4 May 2024	11 December 2024	1	221 days
Fadel Warda	4 May 2024	11 December 2024	1	221 days
Yasser Shaheen	4 May 2024	11 December 2024	1	221 days
Jumana Al-Nouri	4 May 2024	11 December 2024	1	221 days

=== Members of the Oversight and Inspection Committee ===
Members of the 1st Oversight and Inspection Committee
Name	Took office	Left office	Term(s)	Duration
Abdul Razzaq Al-Jassem	4 May 2024	11 December 2024	1	221 days
Rama Aziz	4 May 2024	11 December 2024	1	221 days
Abdul Ahad Safar	4 May 2024	11 December 2024	1	221 days
Thuraya Maslamaniyah	4 May 2024	11 December 2024	1	221 days
Mazen Tuffaha	4 May 2024	11 December 2024	1	221 days
