= Hilal Hilal =

Syrian politician

- هلال هلال

Assistant Secretary-General of the Central Command of the Syrian Regional Branch
- In office 10 July 2013 – 8 May 2024
- Secretary-General: Bashar al-Assad
- Preceded by: Mohammed Saeed Bekheitan
- Succeeded by: Ibrahim al-Hadid

Assistant Secretary-General of the Central Command of the Arab Socialist Ba'ath Party
- In office 26 October 2018 – 8 May 2024
- Secretary-General: Bashar al-Assad
- Preceded by: Abdullah al-Ahmar
- Succeeded by: Ibrahim al-Hadid

Member of the Central Command of the Syrian Regional Branch
- In office 8 July 2013 – 8 May 2024

Personal details
- Born: 1966 (age 59–60) Azaz, Syria
- Party: Ba'ath Party
- Other political affiliations: National Progressive Front

Hilal al-Hilal (Arabic: هلال الهلال; born 1966) is a Syrian politician who is the former Assistant Secretary-General of the Syrian Regional Branch of the Ba'ath Party, and was the Party Secretary of the Branch Command of Aleppo in 2011.

He served two terms as a member of the Aleppo party Branch Command. He currently lives in Beirut, Lebanon.
