= Ibrahim al-Hadid =

Syrian doctor and politician

His Excellency Ibrahim al-Hadid
- ابراهیم الحديد
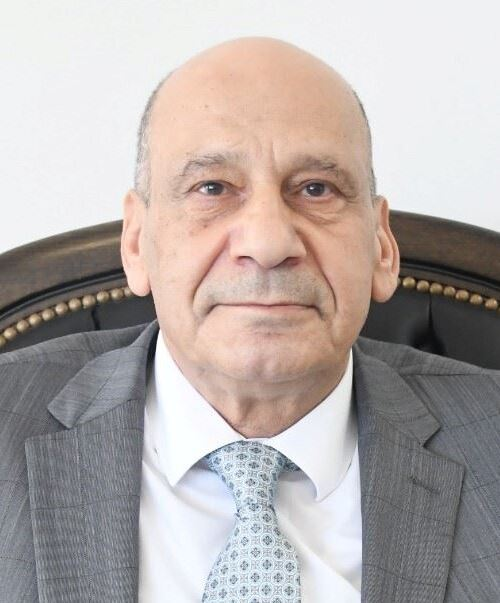
- Al-Hadid in 2022

General Secretary of the Central Command of the Arab Socialist Ba'ath Party – Syria Region
- Acting
- In office 8 December 2024 – 11 December 2024
- Deputy: Himself
- Preceded by: Bashar al-Assad
- Succeeded by: Party dissolved

Assistant General Secretary of the Central Command of the Arab Socialist Ba'ath Party – Syria Region
- In office 8 May 2024 – 11 December 2024
- General Secretary: Bashar al-Assad; Himself (acting)
- Preceded by: Hilal Hilal
- Succeeded by: Party dissolved

Personal details
- Born: 1956 (age 69–70) Homs, Homs Governorate, Syria
- Party: Ba'ath Party (until 2024)
- Other political affiliations: National Progressive Front (until 2024)
- Education: University of Aleppo; University of London
- Occupation: Professor, Dean
- Profession: Medical Doctor, Politician

Ibrahim al-Hadid (Arabic: ابراهيم الحديد; born 1956) is a Syrian doctor and politician who served as the assistant general secretary of the Ba'ath Party from 8 May to 11 December 2024. He was the Ba'ath Party secretary of the Branch Command in the University of Aleppo between 2018 and 2024. He served two terms as a member of the Aleppo Party Branch Command.

== Life and education ==
Ibrahim Muhammad Al-Hadid was born in Homs in 1956. He studied medicine at the University of Aleppo, finishing with a bachelor's degree in medicine in 1980. He ended his studies in 1985 at the University of Aleppo with a specialty in clinical Urology. In 1986, he was dispatched to the United Kingdom and acquired a diploma in Urology from the University of London. In 1989, he received a Fellowship Certificate from the Royal College of Surgeons of England (FRCS).

== Career ==
In the 1990s, he was head of the ambulance and urology divisions in Aleppo. Between 2012 and 2018, he was named the general director of Aleppo University Hospital and dean of the Faculty of Medicine, University of Aleppo. Between 2018 and 2022, he held positions of the general director of Al-Kindi Hospital and secretary of the Party Branch at the University of Aleppo.

After the fall of the Assad regime in December 2024, al-Hadid announced that the Ba'ath Party supports a new transitional government for the sake of maintaining unity in Syria. On December 11, the Ba'ath Party suspended all its activities indefinitely and transferred its assets to the Syrian state, effectively dissolving the party.

Party political offices
Preceded by Bashar al-Assad	Secretary of the Syrian Regional Command of the Arab Socialist Ba'ath Party; 2024	Succeeded by Party dissolved
