= Poster War =

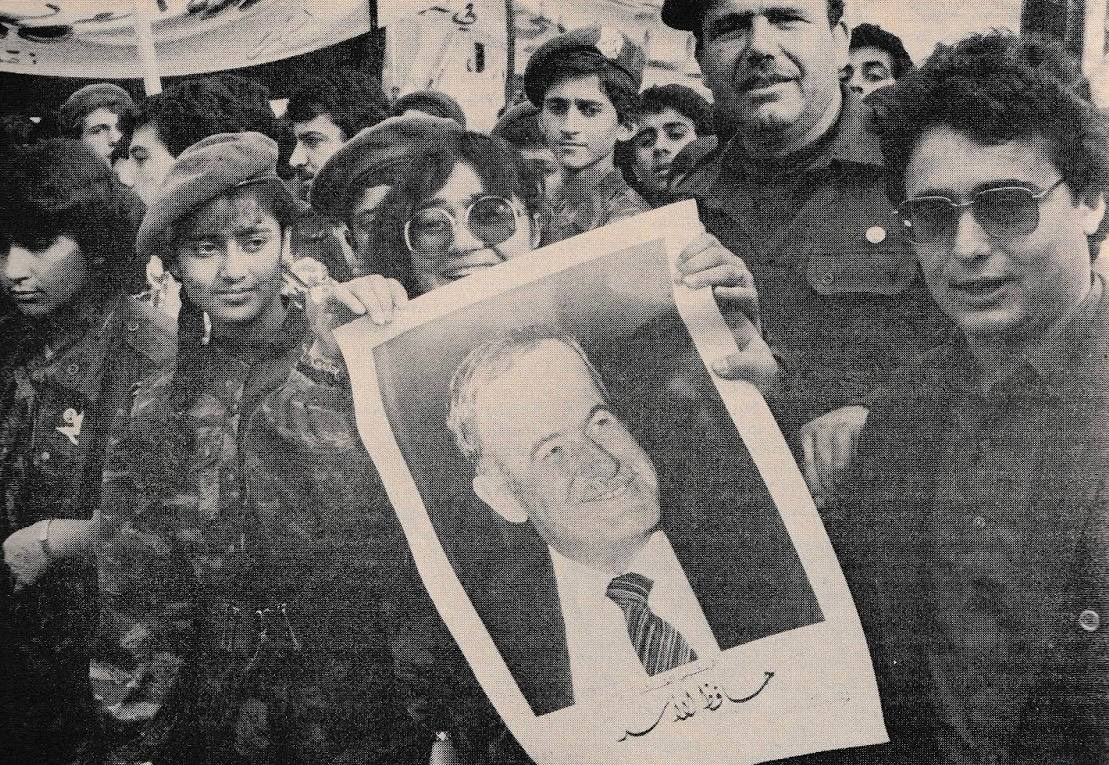
- Crowd of Syrian youth with portrait of Hafez al-Assad, 1984
| Date | November-December, 1983 (more than a week) |
| Location | Damascus, Syria |
| Result | Unconvincing: Escalation of conflict in the government; Rifaat launched coup attempt later |

Belligerents
| Republican Guard; General Intelligence Directorate | Defence Companies |

Commanders and leaders
| Hafez al-Assad | Rifaat al-Assad |

Casualties and losses
- No casualties (non-violent conflict)

Poster War was a small, non-violent conflict in Ba'athist Syria that took place between Rifaat al-Assad and his brother, President Hafez al-Assad, or more precisely between sections of the security forces loyal to both. The most active phase of the Poster War lasted more than a week, until Hafez's health stabilized, although similar incidents occurred at a lower frequency until Rifaat al-Assad's ouster from Syria in March 1984. The name "Poster War" was given by the residents of Damascus, which was the main site of the events.

== Events ==
In November 1983, as President Hafez al-Assad's health deteriorated, his brother Rifaat hoped to usurp power, believing that he would no longer be able to govern. Part of this involved luring government officials and military personnel to their side, as well as the Poster War.

The Poster War "officially" began with a direct order from Rifaat to units loyal to him to begin hanging his portraits around Damascus in latter part of November. So, during the War, Rifaat's loyal Defense Companies (a paramilitary force under his command) began pasting his (as well as eldest brother, Jamil) portraits around Damascus, including in place of the portraits of Hafez al-Assad that they had been removing. Posters with Rifaat image were placed in public places, on houses and buses. The posted photographs of Rifat were captioned "the commander," while Jamil's photographs was captioned "the spiritual father." In addition, Rifaat's image appeared on Syrian television for a while. This led to tensions between Rifaat loyalists and Hafez loyalists: in response, the latter again removed all Rifaat posters and returned Hafez posters to the streets of the city.

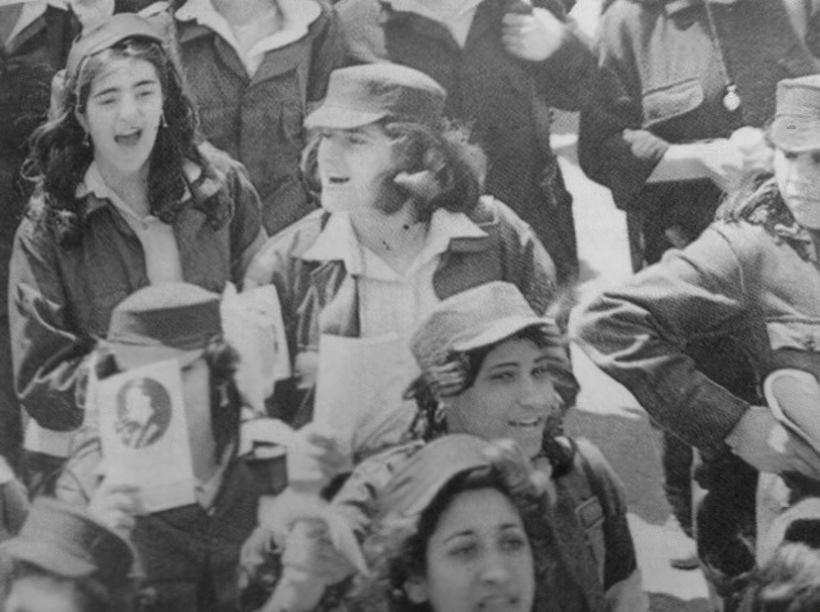
Students in military uniforms at a pro-government demonstration, early 1980s

This exchange of posters from one to the other and back continued for about a week and was accompanied by significant movement of soldiers and armored vehicles on both sides: but similar incidents were repeated until Rifaat was expelled from Syria. Often the posters would hang for several hours until they were taken down by loyalists on the opposite side.

Some Syrians have suggested that the outbreak of the Poster War was due to Rifaat's dissatisfaction with the fact that he was not included in the Syria Governance Committee, which was formed by Hafez earlier due to his own deteriorating health (it included only close Sunnis and not a single Alawite). When Rifaat later staged a coup attempt, his supporters again began hanging his posters en masse throughout Damascus to mobilize public support.

== Aftermath ==
The subsequent escalation of events resulted in an attempted coup by Rifaat in late March 1984, which almost led to civil war. However, it failed and Rifaat went into permanent exile.
