= Pan-Arab Command of the Arab Revolutionary Forces =

The Pan-Arab Command of the Arab Revolutionary Forces (also rendered as the Pan-Arab Command for Leading the Arab Revolutionary Forces) was a pan-Arab political and revolutionary organization established in Tripoli, Libya, in March 1985 under the sponsorship of Libyan leader Muammar Gaddafi. It was intended to serve as an umbrella organization for revolutionary, nationalist and militant movements operating across the Arab world.

The organization advocated Arab political unity, opposition to Israel and Western including USA and UK, influence in the Middle East, and support for revolutionary movements seeking to overthrow governments it regarded as reactionary or aligned with foreign powers. Contemporary U.S. intelligence assessments described it as an attempt by Gaddafi to coordinate radical Arab organizations within a common political framework.

The Pan-Arab Command held its first major meeting in Tripoli in March 1985 and a second conference there in February 1986. Its activities attracted international attention during a period of escalating confrontation between Libya and the United States and Israel.

== Background ==
The organization emerged from Gaddafi's longstanding commitment to pan-Arabism, the ideology that the Arabic-speaking peoples constituted a single nation whose political division into separate states was artificial and should ultimately be overcome through unity.

Since coming to power in 1969, Gaddafi had repeatedly pursued political unions between Libya and other Arab states. Libya participated in or proposed unity arrangements involving Egypt, Sudan, Syria and Tunisia during the 1970s, followed by further projects with Syria in 1980 and Morocco in 1984. Most of these initiatives either failed to be implemented or proved short-lived.

The Pan-Arab Command represented a different approach. Instead of seeking Arab unity exclusively through agreements between governments, it attempted to organize political parties, Palestinian factions, revolutionary organizations and other movements across national boundaries.

Gaddafi nevertheless continued to pursue interstate union projects at the same time. During an April 1985 press conference, for example, he described the recently established Arab-African Union between Libya and Morocco as a possible step toward wider Arab unity while distinguishing that arrangement from the activities of the Pan-Arab Command.

=== Ideological background ===
The Pan-Arab Command emerged from a longer tradition of revolutionary pan-Arab nationalism that regarded the liberation of Palestine, Arab political unity, and the transformation of existing Arab political systems as interconnected objectives.

Following the 1948 Arab–Israeli War, Arab nationalist intellectuals including Constantin Zureiq argued that the Arab defeat demonstrated the need for a comprehensive political, social, and intellectual transformation of the Arab world. In The Meaning of the Nakba (1948), Zureiq presented the defeat as a catalyst for Arab national revival and advocated political and social transformation and the mobilization of Arab society.

Following the Arab defeat in the Six-Day War of 1967, elements of this revolutionary tradition became increasingly associated with Palestinian guerrilla organizations and the Arab nationalist left. The Popular Front for the Liberation of Palestine (PFLP), led by George Habash, situated the Palestinian struggle within a wider Arab and international revolutionary movement, connecting Palestinian liberation with political transformation elsewhere in the Arab world.

Muammar Gaddafi's political ideology developed within the broader revolutionary pan-Arab environment. After taking power in Libya in 1969, he repeatedly advocated Arab political unity, opposition to Israel and Western influence, and support for revolutionary movements. The establishment of the Pan-Arab Command of the Arab Revolutionary Forces in Tripoli in March 1985 represented an attempt to create an organizational framework linking revolutionary movements around the stated objectives of Arab unity and the "liberation" of Arab territory.

Writer Hussein Aboubakr Mansour has interpreted the broader development of twentieth-century Arab revolutionary politics as involving repeated attempts to connect the Palestinian question with wider projects of Arab political transformation. In this interpretation, the revolutionary politics later associated with figures such as Gaddafi formed part of a longer intellectual trajectory extending from Arab nationalist responses to the 1948 war through the Palestinian and Arab revolutionary movements that developed after 1967.

=== Formation ===
The Pan-Arab Command was established during a conference of Arab revolutionary organizations held in Tripoli from 29 to 31 March 1985, at which Gaddafi was elected its leader.

The concluding session took place on 31 March 1985. During the meeting, a declaration, an organizational statute, and the organization's Decision No. 1 were formally read out. Gaddafi addressed the participants and characterized the gathering as an unprecedented attempt to bring together Arab revolutionaries at a pan-Arab level.

Contemporary Libyan reporting referred to the organization as the Pan-Arab Command of the Arab Revolutionary Forces. English-language contemporary sources used several slightly different translations of its Arabic name, including Pan-Arab Command for Leading the Arab Revolutionary Forces and Pan-Arab Command of the Revolutionary Forces in the Arab Homeland.

A later U.S. intelligence assessment described the Command as an umbrella organization founded by Gaddafi in March 1985 for the purpose of uniting Arab revolutionary movements and coordinating their activities.

=== Ideology and objectives ===
The Command was based primarily on revolutionary pan-Arab nationalism. Its declared ultimate objectives were the liberation of the Arab homeland and unity of the Arab nation.

At an April 1985 press conference, Gaddafi stated that the Command had been created to lead revolutionary forces throughout the Arab world and presented its activities as a legitimate struggle for Arab liberation and unification. He also expressed support for revolutionary movements outside the Arab world, including movements in Africa, Latin America and other regions.

The organization opposed:

- the existence and policies of Israel;
- United States military and political influence in the Arab world;
- foreign military bases in Arab countries; and
- Arab governments characterized by the Command as “reactionary”.

A U.S. intelligence assessment subsequently summarized the organization's stated aims as including the destruction of Israel, overthrow of governments considered reactionary, opposition to what it called U.S. imperialism, removal of American military bases, and attacks on American interests. That characterization reflected the terminology used by the Command and contemporary U.S. analysis rather than a neutral description of the governments concerned.

The organization also endorsed revolutionary violence as a legitimate method of political struggle. During the concluding session of its first meeting, Gaddafi called for revolutionary action to achieve Arab liberation and unity. His rhetoric prompted strong criticism from the United States, whose government accused Libya of encouraging international terrorism. Gaddafi rejected that characterization and maintained that the Command represented a national liberation movement.

=== Organization ===
The Command appears to have consisted of representatives of participating political parties, revolutionary organizations, Palestinian factions and other movements.

Its founding conference adopted an organizational statute, while later references identify a General Secretariat of the Pan-Arab Command of Arab Revolutionary Forces.

The exact membership, internal hierarchy and decision-making procedures are difficult to reconstruct from publicly available documentation. Membership also appears to have overlapped with the network of Palestinian and Arab organizations maintaining political or material relationships with Libya during the 1980s.

=== 1986 Tripoli conference ===
A second major meeting of the Pan-Arab Command was held in Tripoli in February 1986. A later U.S. intelligence chronology identified it as the organization's second meeting.

The gathering brought together representatives of Arab revolutionary organizations and Palestinian factions during a period of severe tension between Libya, Israel and the United States. The meeting was attended by representatives of the ruling Syrian Ba'ath Party and several Palestinian organizations, including the Fatah Revolutionary Council, the Popular Front for the Liberation of Palestine (PFLP), the PFLP–General Command and the Palestinian Popular Struggle Front.

The conference became particularly notable because of an incident immediately following the meeting. Israeli forces intercepted a Libyan aircraft travelling from the conference toward Damascus, believing that prominent Palestinian militant leaders who had attended the Tripoli gathering might be aboard.

Israeli aircraft compelled the Libyan plane to land in Israel. The Palestinian leaders being sought were not aboard, but senior leaders of the Syrian Baath party, including Abdullah al-Ahmar, were. After several hours the aircraft was subsequently allowed to continue its journey. A later U.S. intelligence account described the operation as an unsuccessful Israeli attempt to capture Palestinian participants returning from the Pan-Arab Command conference. George Habash believed he was the intended target. The interception was subsequently cited as a possible motive for the Hindawi affair, an April 1986 attempt to bomb an El Al airliner departing Heathrow Airport. Contemporary diplomatic assessments reported that, if the Syrian government had ordered the operation, it may have been intended as retaliation for Israel's interception of the Libyan aircraft carrying Syrian officials from the Pan-Arab Command meeting two months earlier.

The incident drew additional international attention to the organization and to Libya's relationships with Palestinian armed groups.

=== International reaction ===
The establishment of the Pan-Arab Command occurred during a period of deteriorating relations between Libya and the United States.

The Reagan administration interpreted Gaddafi's calls for revolutionary violence and his support for armed organizations as part of Libya's sponsorship of international terrorism. Following Gaddafi's statements at the first Pan-Arab Command conference, the U.S. State Department publicly warned that Libya would be held responsible for attacks against American citizens or interests connected with Libyan support.

Gaddafi responded by accusing the United States of interfering in Arab affairs. He maintained that the Command's struggle was defensive and directed toward liberation and unification of the Arab world rather than indiscriminate international violence. At the same time, he warned that foreign intervention in Arab affairs could result in the conflict extending beyond the region.

The dispute over the Command therefore formed part of the wider confrontation between Libya and the United States that intensified during 1985–1986.

=== Later activity ===
The organization continued operating after the February 1986 conference.

A U.S. intelligence chronology records a meeting of the General Secretariat of the Pan-Arab Command of Arab Revolutionary Forces in Tripoli on 14 October 1986. The gathering included representatives of revolutionary and Palestinian organizations associated with Libya.

The Command does not appear to have developed into the unified pan-Arab revolutionary leadership envisioned in Gaddafi's rhetoric. Differences between Arab governments, Palestinian factions and revolutionary movements limited the prospects for a durable unified organization.

Its subsequent institutional history is poorly documented in readily available English-language sources, and it eventually disappeared from prominence as a distinct organization.

== Relationship with Libya ==
Although established in Tripoli and closely associated with Gaddafi, the Command was formally presented as a transnational revolutionary organization rather than an institution of the Libyan government.

Gaddafi explicitly drew this distinction during a press conference on 10 April 1985. He argued that the Libyan Arab Jamahiriya was a sovereign member state of the United Nations, whereas the Pan-Arab Command represented revolutionary forces operating throughout the Arab world. He consequently rejected attempts to attribute the actions of organizations associated with the Command automatically to the Libyan state.

Foreign governments, particularly the United States, disputed the practical significance of this distinction because the organization had been established under Gaddafi's sponsorship and Libya had extensive relationships with several of the militant organizations involved.

Contemporary U.S. analysis concluded that Gaddafi regarded the Command as a possible framework for bringing disparate radical Arab movements together, comparable in some respects to his attempts to promote political unity between Arab states.

== Historical context and significance ==
The Pan-Arab Command formed part of Gaddafi's broader effort to position Libya as a center of revolutionary politics during the 1970s and 1980s.

Unlike conventional organizations for interstate cooperation, the Command attempted to construct a political network that crossed national boundaries. Its participants and intended constituency included political movements and armed organizations rather than simply governments.

The organization also reflected a transformation in Gaddafi's approach to pan-Arab unity. Earlier Libyan initiatives had concentrated heavily on proposed political unions between existing Arab states. The Pan-Arab Command instead sought unity from below—or outside established state institutions—through cooperation among movements claiming to represent a broader Arab revolutionary struggle.

A contemporary U.S. intelligence assessment nevertheless concluded that considerable propaganda surrounded the organization and questioned how far it could translate its ambitious objectives into coordinated action. The same assessment argued that Gaddafi viewed it as a potential framework through which radical Arab organizations could eventually be united.

The organization is principally remembered in connection with the intense geopolitical confrontation surrounding Libya in the mid-1980s and Gaddafi's attempts to construct transnational alliances among Arab nationalist and Palestinian revolutionary organizations.

== See also ==
- Pan-Arabism
- Arab nationalism
- Muammar Gaddafi
- History of Libya under Muammar Gaddafi
- Foreign relations of Libya under Muammar Gaddafi
- Arab Cold War
- Palestinian political violence
- Libya–United States relations
- 1986 United States bombing of Libya
