= Control and Inspection Committee =

Party organ for monitoring discipline in the Syrian Ba'ath Party

Control and Inspection Committee, also known as the Control and Inspection Committee of the Ba'ath Party, was a five-member political body in Ba'athist Syria whose purpose was to enforce discipline within the ruling Ba'ath Party.

== History ==
=== Background ===
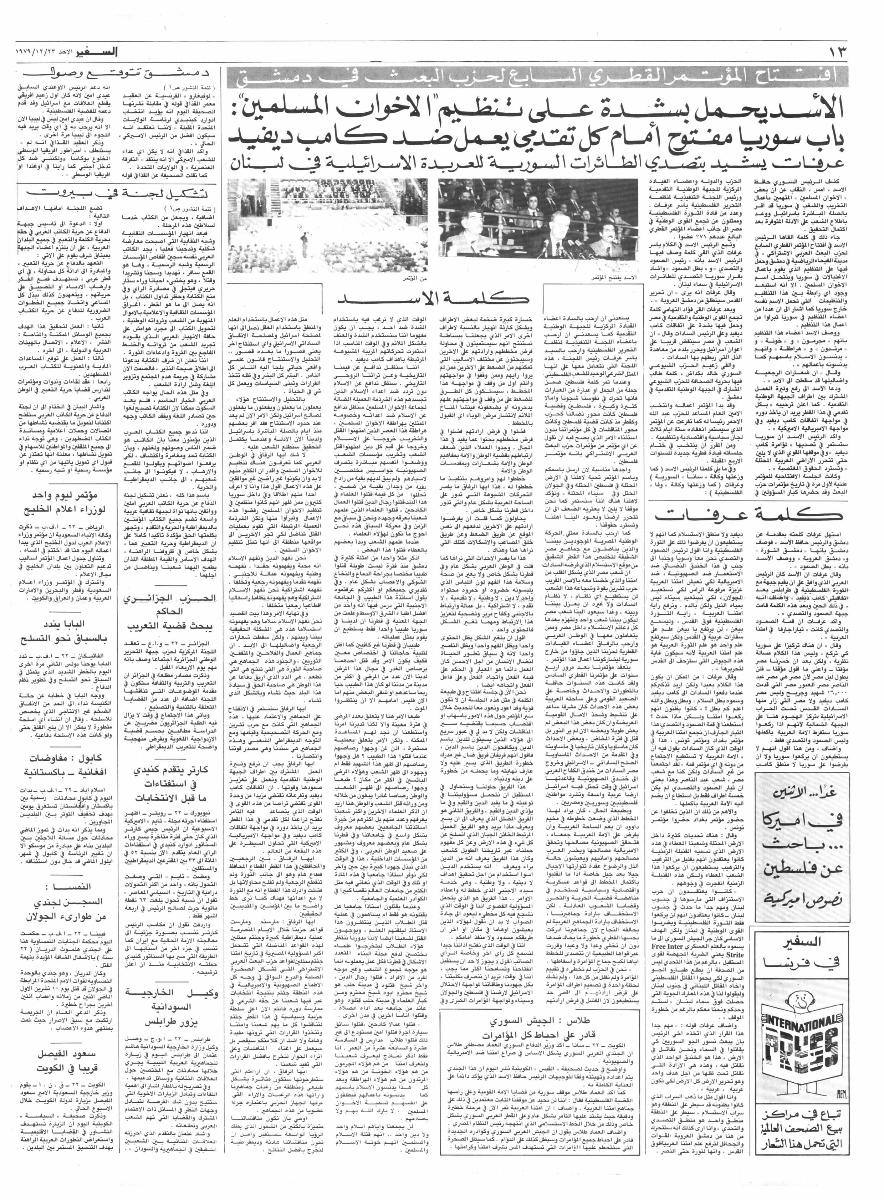
A Syrian newspaper covers political events, December 23, 1979. The top grey line marks the opening of the Seventh Regional Congress.

After coming to power in 1970, Hafez al-Assad expanded recruitment to the Ba'ath Party and relaxed restrictions on membership, turning it into an instrument of ideological mobilization of the population. However, by the late 1970s, the party began to suffer from a number of problems related to its membership. The party became flooded with "opportunists" because of the opportunities for economic development within it. Party discipline, ideological spirit and zeal of party members gradually deteriorated.

Between December 22, 1979, and January 6, 1980, the party's Seventh Regional Congress was held. Its report criticized the inexperience of many party apparatchiks, insufficient "ideological preparation," and the "dispersion of the younger generation." The report also noted "indifference, lack of enthusiasm and party spirit, opportunism, misunderstanding of democracy, and the growth of inherited illnesses in society."

=== Formation and role ===
As a result of the congress, most of the regional command members were relieved of their positions: 14 of the 21 command members were new people. As another result of the seventh regional congress, an Control and Inspection Committee was formed in January 1980. Its stated purpose was to supervise party discipline and the behavior of party officials. All five Committee members were regularly changed or re-elected. As stated, the committee's activities will "rejuvenate" and strengthen the regional command, which should have been subject to purges based on the principle of party professionalism. In addition to discipline, the committee was supposed to monitor deviations from party law and order, compliance with party regulations, and internal party affairs. It monitors compliance with general rules and their violations, proposing measures to eliminate similar violations in the future. In addition, he controls the party's financial projects and its economic institutions, ensuring the targeted use of the party budget. The committee reports directly to the regional party secretary, and its members are full members of the regional congresses. However, membership in it cannot be combined with membership in the Ba'ath Party's Central Committee.

== See also ==
- Al-Jama'a
- Arab Socialist Ba'ath Party Security Law
