= Abdullah al-Ahmar =

Syrian politician

Abdullah al-Ahmar عبدالله الأحمر
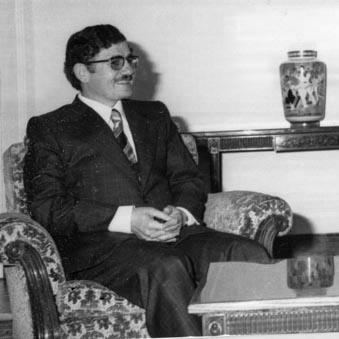
- Ahmar during an official visit to Romania in 1978

Assistant Secretary General of the National Command of the Arab Socialist Ba'ath Party
- In office 17 November 1971 – 26 October 2018
- President: Hafez al-Assad; Bashar al-Assad
- Preceded by: Hafez al-Assad
- Succeeded by: Hilal Hilal

Member of the Regional Command of the Syrian Regional Branch
- In office 13 November 1970 – 9 February 2005

Personal details
- Born: 6 June 1936 (age 90) Al-Tall, French Mandate
- Party: Arab Socialist Ba'ath Party (1954–1966); Syria-based Ba'ath Party (Syrian branch: (1966–2024)
- Other political affiliations: National Progressive Front: (1972–2024)
- Education: University of Damascus

Abdullah Al-Ahmar (Arabic: عبدالله الأحمر; born 6 June 1936) is a Syrian politician and prominent member of the Arab Socialist Ba'ath Party.

== Biography ==
Born at Al-Tall, al-Ahmar joined the Ba'ath Party in the 1950s and graduated from the Faculty of Law at the University of Damascus in 1964. Soon after, he was appointed as a governor of Hama (1967–1969) then Idlib (1969–1970). In 1970, the regional Ba'ath conference elected him to the Syrian Regional Command together with Hafez Al-Assad after an internal coup in the party that expelled Salah Jadid's faction from power. A few months later, Assad's faction held a meeting and appointed a new National Command that elected Assad as a general secretary and Ahmar his deputy. This National Command is competing with another one that was based in Iraq on being the sole legitimate National Command.

=== Role in the Assad-era Ba'ath leadership ===
Al-Ahmar was part of the relatively stable senior political elite that emerged following Hafez al-Assad's seizure of power in 1970. He entered the Syrian Regional Command in November 1970 and was elected assistant secretary-general of the party's National Command the following year, remaining in senior party office for decades.

Scholarly analyses of the Assad-era political system have identified al-Ahmar among the senior Sunni civilian officials incorporated into the ruling elite. Such party and civilian officials formed an important component of the regime's political leadership, although their influence generally depended on their relationship with the presidency rather than on an independent military or security power base.

In 1980, al-Ahmar was re-elected with Assad into the same positions they held since 1971.

In 1986, al-Ahmar was returning from the meeting of the Pan-Arab Command of the Arab Revolutionary Forces on board a private Libyan Gulfstream executive jet flying from Tripoli to Damascus when Israel forced the plane to land in Northern Israel. The Israeli military conducted a five-hour search for "terrorists" before allowing it to leave. Sources close to Israeli intelligence later said the capture of the American-made Gulfstream might have been a mistake. The Israelis were apparently hunting for Palestinian leaders who were attending a meeting of Middle Eastern guerrilla groups in the Libyan capital of Tripoli.George Habash stated he believes he was the intended target. Atef Abu Bakr stated that he understood this to be the reason for the Hindawi affair, which was to be blamed on Abu Nidal.

=== Senior party role after 2000 ===
Following Hafez al-Assad's death in June 2000, the position of secretary-general of the Ba'ath Party's National Command remained formally vacant. As assistant secretary-general, al-Ahmar consequently became the highest-ranking serving official within the National Command, while Bashar al-Assad initially held the separate position of secretary of the Syrian Regional Command. In June 2000, al-Ahmar was the one who formally nominated Bashar al-Assad to succeed his father as leader of the Baath party, paving the way for his Presidency, saying Bashar al-Assad had "a natural readiness for leadership, impeccable manners and concern with public issues."

=== Party diplomacy ===
As assistant secretary-general, al-Ahmar frequently represented the Syrian-led Ba'ath Party in relations with affiliated parties and foreign governments. His role extended beyond Syria's domestic party organisation to contacts with Ba'ath branches and allied political organisations elsewhere in the Arab world.

In 2013, he led a Ba'ath Party delegation to North Korea. In 2015 he was also reported to have participated, together with senior Syrian party officials, in decisions concerning the leadership of the Lebanese branch of the Ba'ath Party.

In 2017, the party's fourteenth national conference abolished the old National Command and replaced it with a consultative National Council, with Bashar al-Assad assuming the senior national leadership position, being elected the Secretary General of the National Council, replacing al-Ahmar.. A year later, he stepped down from his position as Assistant Secretary General, handing it over to Hilal Hilal.

In September 2022, at age 86, al-Ahmar made a rare public appearance to vote in local elections. A contemporary report specifically says that he participated in the election in the city of al-Tall, from which he originates.

Following the Fall of the Assad regime, in June 2026, the new Syrian authorities added Abdullah al-Ahmar, aged 90, to that month's updated list of former-regime figures subject to precautionary seizure of property (الحجز الاحتياطي) and a prohibition on travel (منع السفر). It was reported that this covers his movable and immovable property, i.e., not merely bank accounts but potentially real estate and other assets. The assets of his children by his two wives were also frozen.

== Sources ==
- Abdullah Al-Ahmar(in Arabic).
- TV Interview on YouTube (in Arabic)
- Second Baath party figure arrested in Syria, archive.today. Retrieved 3 March 2024.
