= Zuhair Masharqa =

Syrian politician (1938–2007)

- زهير مشارقة
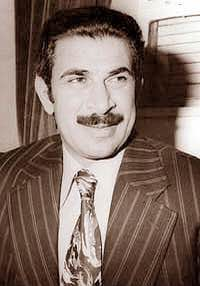
- Masharqa in 1970s

Vice President of Syria
- In office 11 March 1984 – 21 February 2006 Serving with Rifaat al-Assad and Abdul Halim Khaddam
- President: Hafez al-Assad; Bashar al-Assad
- Preceded by: Rifaat al-Assad
- Succeeded by: Farouk Sharaa

Assistant Regional Secretary of the Syrian Regional Branch
- In office 7 January 1980 – 20 January 1985
- Regional Secretary: Hafez al-Assad
- Preceded by: Mohamad Jaber Bajbouj
- Succeeded by: Sulayman Qaddah

Member of the Regional Command of the Syrian Regional Branch
- In office 15 April 1975 – 9 June 2005

Personal details
- Born: 1938 Aleppo, Syria
- Died: 23 April 2007 (aged 68–69) Damascus, Syria
- Resting place: Aleppo
- Party: Ba'ath Party
- Education: Damascus University; Aleppo University

Muhammad Zuhair Masharqa (Arabic: زهير مشارقة; 1938 – 23 April 2007) was a Syrian politician who served as Vice President of Syria from 1984 to 2006.

== Early life and education ==
Masharqa came from a Sunni family. He received a bachelor's degree in education from Damascus University in 1961. He also obtained a degree in law from Aleppo University in 1968.

== Career ==
His first public post was governor of Hama to which he was appointed in 1973. Masharqa became a member of the Baath Party in 1975. Later he became deputy director of the party. Masharqa was appointed to the cabinet in 1978 as Minister of Education and became vice president for Domestic Affairs on 11 March 1984. He was the country's longest serving vice president, in office from 1984 to 2006, and was particularly noted for his loyalty to Hafez al-Assad. After the death of Assad in 2000, a 9-member committee was formed to oversee the transition period, and Masharqa was among its members.

Bashar al-Assad chose to retain him as a vice president up to his retirement in 2006. He was replaced by Farouk Sharaa as vice president.

== Personal life ==
Masharqa was married and had five children.

== Death and burial ==
Masharqa died due to a massive heart attack in Damascus on 23 April 2007. His body was buried in Aleppo.
