= Arab Socialist Ba'ath Party Security Law =

Law No. 53
- Territorial extent: Syria
- Effective: April 8, 1979
- Repealed: 8 December 2024 (de facto)
- Status: Repealed

Arab Socialist Ba'ath Party Security Law (also known as Law No. 53 or just a Party Security Law) was adopted in Ba'athist Syria in April 8, 1979. The law confirmed Article 8 of the Syrian Constitution of 1973, which stated that the Ba'ath Party was the ruling party in the state and society. The purpose of the law was to ensure security for the Ba'ath Party as the leading party in Syria in its governance. The law criminalized "deviations" within the party and attacks on it. The law prescribed prison terms of five to ten years for any Ba'ath Party member who joined another political organization (outside the Ba'athist National Progressive Front), or for anyone who joined the Ba'ath Party to work for another, unaffiliated political organization. Prison terms were also imposed for offenses such as attacking party offices, obstructing party activities, and attempting to obtain secret party documents or confidential information. If such offenses were committed at the instigation of foreign interests, they were punishable by death penalty. For example, Article 10 often punishes a person with the death penalty if he attacks the Ba'ath Party headquarters, especially if it was done with outside support or if the attack resulted in human casualties. The law also provided for similarly harsh punishment for theft or attempted theft of confidential information from the party.

During the entire Ba'ath Party rule from 1963 to 2024, the law was never repealed. The opposition to the Assad regime, both within and outside the country, included this law in the list of those it demanded be repealed. In 2015, anti-Assad forces announced the abolition of this and a number of other Ba'athist laws in rebel-controlled regions.
