= Defense Companies (Syria) =

Former Syrian military unit

Companies for the Defense of the Revolution
- سرايا الدفاع عن الثورة
- Defense Companies shoulder sleeve insignia
- Active: 1971–1984
- Country: Ba'athist Syria
- Allegiance: Syrian Arab Armed Forces (Ba'athist Syria)
- Branch: Airborne forces Armoured Corps
- Type: Praetorian Guard; Shock troops Special operations force
- Role: Airborne forces Armoured warfare Counter-insurgency; Direct action Raiding; Special operations Urban warfare
- Size: 55,000 (peak in 1982)
- Part of: Division Command HQ; 5 Brigades; 26 Battalions
- Garrison/HQ: Mezzeh Air Base, Damascus
- Equipment: T-72 tanks BM-21 Grad; Mil Mi-24D Attack helicopters 122 mm howitzer 2A18 (D-30); 2S4 Tyulpan heavy mortars Ilyushin Il-76 Transport aircraft
- Engagements: Lebanese Civil War; Syrian intervention; Hundred Days' War; Qaa massacre; 1982 Lebanon War; Mountain War; Battle of Tripoli; Islamist uprising in Syria; Siege of Aleppo; 1981 Hama massacre; 1982 Hama massacre; 1984 Syrian coup attempt

Commanders
- Ceremonial chief: Maj. Gen. Rifaat al-Assad
- Notable commanders: Maj. Gen. Rifaat al-Assad; Maj. Gen. Adnan Makhlouf

The Companies for the Defense of the Revolution (Arabic: سرايا الدفاع عن الثورة; Sarāyā ad-Difāʿʿan al-thawra), commonly referred to as Defense Companies, Defense Corps or Defense Brigades (Arabic: سرايا الدفاع; Sarāyā ad-Difāʿ) and informally called "Rifaat's boys", were a Syrian all-Alawite paramilitary force commanded by Rifaat al-Assad. Their task was to safeguard and defend the government of Hafez al-Assad, and the capital Damascus, from internal and external attack.

In 1984, the 55,000 strong (according to other sources, 60,000-70,000 strong) Defense Companies was dismantled and merged into the Syrian Arab Armed Forces expanding the Republican Guard, and the 14th Special Forces Division comprising 5 Special Forces regiments. The rump force then became the 569th Armored Division which later became the 4th Armoured Division.

== History and deployment ==
The lessons of the Six-Day War of 1967 pointed to the fact of the weak airborne and heavy armor capabilities of the Syrian military. There was a perceptible lack of expertise in combined arms operations involving a combined deployment of armoured, artillery and airborne infantry units. Top Syrian military commanders and Hafez al-Assad recognized the need to create a powerful and operationally self-sufficient Divisional command that would incorporate all the elements of modern combined arms. Also the political instability of the preceding decade in Syria pointed to the necessity of having a large and well-equipped body of highly loyal soldiers with strategic responsibilities of dealing with threats to the Ba'athist government. From 1968 onwards many Alawite officers and soldiers from the regular Army were sent for advanced training to the Soviet Union in order to build up such a unit.

The Defense Companies were founded in 1971 under this plan and were organizationally and operationally independent of the regular armed forces. They were under the command of Rifaat al-Assad, the president's brother. The Defense Companies were garrisoned outside Damascus, with the primary mission of countering attempted coups and challenges to the Assad government. These special forces, however, also had military missions beyond the role of a praetorian guard.

The Defense Companies were initially trained by Soviet Spetsnaz special forces, VDV airborne forces, and the Soviet Army Tank Corps. They had regular Soviet advisors and conducted frequent war games and field exercises with the Soviet Army. Their expertise lay in Soviet-style combined arms operations involving armour, mechanized, artillery, and airborne forces. Defense Companies commanders were known to be personally close to several high-ranking Soviet military officials, like Vasily Margelov and Dmitri Sukhorukov, commanders of the Soviet Airborne Forces (VDV).

=== Engagements ===
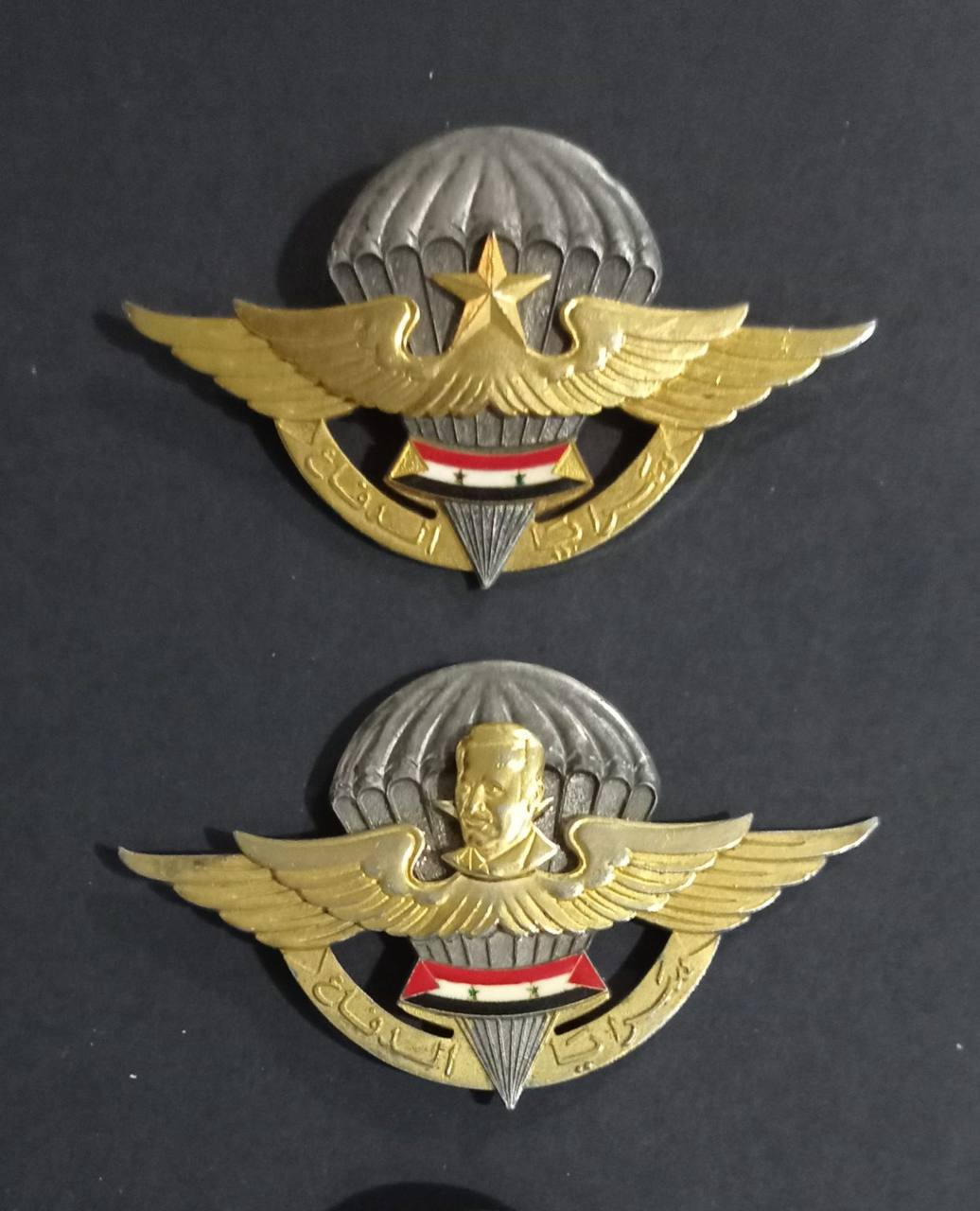
The badge of the Defense Companies, two versions of the design (before and after 1984). The second version features an image of President Hafez al-Assad and began to be used after the 1984 coup attempt, emphasizing the individualization of the regime

The Defence Companies served in Syria's first armed intervention in the Lebanese Civil War in 1976, especially the initial offensive operations against PLO and PSP positions in Sidon and the Chouf, and were involved in internal security operations during the nationwide strikes and demonstrations in Aleppo in March 1980 and in June 1980. Lt. Col. Nassif ran a revenge operation after an attempted assassination of the President in 1980, in which a Battalion of Defense Company soldiers killed up to 1,000 Tadmor Prison inmates suspected of belonging to the Muslim Brotherhood. In Spring 1982, 2 brigades of the Defence Companies and other elite armoured formations were deployed in Hama to quell an Islamist uprising, in what became known as the Hama Massacre. In Lebanon, Defense Companies units supported pro-Syrian Lebanese militias, and cooperated closely with the Tripoli-based Arab Red Knights of the Arab Democratic Party (founded in 1981 by Rifaat al Assad and composed largely of Lebanese Alawites), and the Lebanese Baath Party and its militia, the Assad Battalion.

The Defense Companies were also deployed against Jordan. In late February 1981, some of their senior commanders, including Colonel Adnan Barakat, were alleged to have been involved in an abortive assassination attempt against Jordanian Prime Minister Mudar Badran. Members of the Defense Companies also reportedly have been sent abroad to monitor Syrian political exiles and to impede their activities. Following a power struggle between Rifaat al Assad and his rivals in the armed forces in early 1984, the Defense Companies were renamed Unit 569 and reorganized as a standard armored division with four armored and three mechanized brigades.

=== Structure and equipment ===
Members of the approximately 55,000 strong Defense Companies were organised into companies of 120 to 200 men, which in turn were organized into Battalions of about 600 to 800 men, under a Lt. Col. Battalion Commanders were directly under the command of the Division Commander, Rifaat al-Assad, who actually held the rank of Brigadier throughout this period. There were separate Aviation squadrons and Artillery battalions within the Defense Companies. Most Defense Company soldiers, including Tank crewmen and Artillery personnel, received advanced commando and parachute training, as well as basic training in Tank warfare. The unit included a female parachutist corps. All or most of these were organized into 12 brigades.

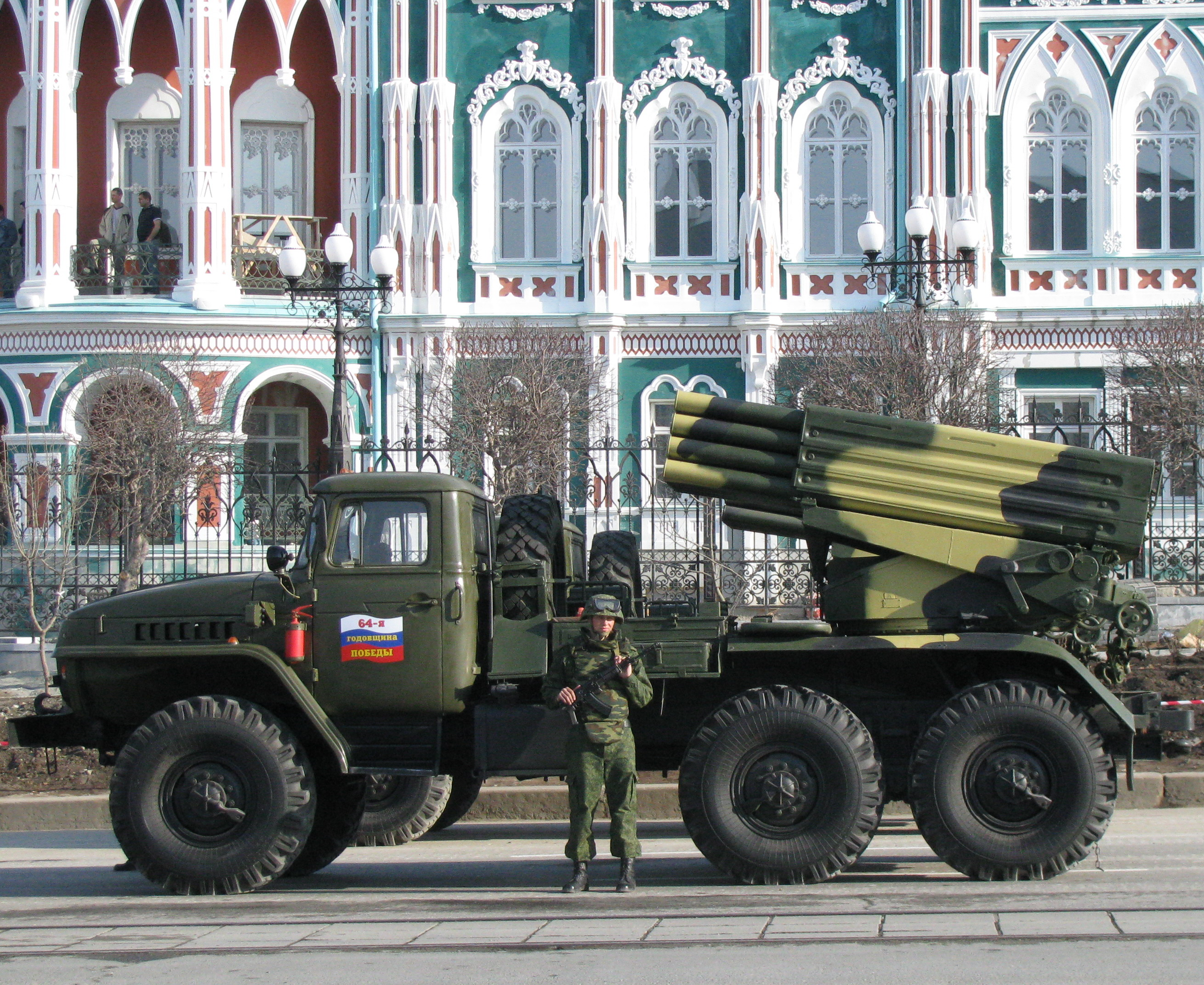
BM-21-1 launch vehicle during a military parade in Yekaterinburg, 9 May 2009. This rocket artillery system was heavily deployed by the Defense Companies during the Hama Massacre.

The Defense Companies were equipped with some of the most modern weapons available to the Syrian Army, including T-72 tanks, BM-21 Grad rocket artillery units, 2S4 Tyulpan heavy mortar vehicles, 122 mm howitzer 2A18 (D-30) field artillery howitzers, and Mil Mi-24D and Mil Mi-8 attack helicopters, and could demand logistical help and support from the regular military. The Defense Company paratroop units were usually deployed from the AN-22 or IL-76 aircraft.

At their peak in 1983–84, the force had about 1200 T-72 Tanks, 120 Mil Mi-8 and 75 Mil Mi-24D attack helicopters, and three battalions (around 50 launch trucks) of BM-21 Grad systems. During this period (1973–1984), the whole Syrian Military only had 7 Grad battalions, and 3 of them were with the Defense Companies, illustrating the unit's importance in the Syrian Military hierarchy. They were also equipped with 4 units of the very powerful 2S4 Tyulpan 240-mm self-propelled heavy mortar vehicles. The 3rd and 10th Armoured Divisions were the only other Syrian division having access to this weapons system.

=== Training and doctrine ===
Training consisted primarily of infantry training combined with Special Forces commando training modelled on the Soviet system. Recruits who passed this initial stage were given parachute training as well as advanced training either in airborne operations, artillery, Armour or Mechanized forces. Training for recruits usually was for 1 year whereas for officers it was for 2 years including a 4-month course at Soviet military academies. Howerever, almost all Defense Companies personnel were qualified paratroopers as well as had to pass a basic course on familiarization with Tanks and Tank warfare. Tank training and doctrine was focused on using Tanks and Armoured formations in urban warfare environments, close-quarters combat, and deployment of Tank units alongside Airborne special forces used as shock troops. According to several Defense Company commanders, they developed their own military theories and doctrines, especially a new armoured doctrine in which the Tank itself was to substitute as a Commando soldier in close-quarters urban combat. The Tank was to be considered as an individual commando in an urban combat situation, and thus Tank training was very intensive and focused on attaining unimaginable feats with the Tank. This included engaging targets at less than 20 metres range, firing the main gun from within a building, and so on. These tactics were developed by Saraya officers during the Muslim brotherhood insurgency in Hama and Aleppo, and in Lebanon. This strategy was used extensively by successor units of the Saraya in the Syrian Civil War.

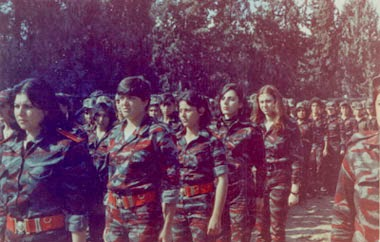
Syrian women from the Defense Companies on the demonstration

After basic training, the Saraya conducted their advanced courses at secret locations in the Damascus Countryside, Tartous mountains, and in Syrian-controlled parts of Lebanon. Much of the initial generations of Saraya soldiers had been trained in the Soviet Union.

=== Uniforms ===
The Saraya al-Difa wore combat uniforms quite distinct from the regular Syrian military, their uniform consisted of vertical lizard-pattern or US woodland pattern camouflage fatigues along with Soviet combat boots, helmets and bulletproof vests. Headgear consisted of orange berets.

== See also ==
- Struggle Companies (Syria) – a similar but much smaller force
- Shabiha – an all Alawite al-Assad family run militia

== Sources ==
- Arabs at War: Military Effectiveness 1948–91, Kenneth M. Pollack, University of Nebraska Press, Lincoln and London, 2002, and Pollack's book reviewed in International Security, Vol. 28, No. 2
- Arab Armies of the Middle East Wars (Men-at-Arms, 194) by Samuel Katz, Osprey Publishing 1988, ISBN 978-0-85045-800-8
- Armies in Lebanon 1982 to 1984 (Men at Arms Series, 165) by Samuel Katz and Ronald Volstad, Osprey Publishing 1985, ISBN 978-0-85045-602-8
