= Issa al-Khouli =

- Born: Syria
- Died: 11 February 2012; Damascus, Syria
- Military career
- Allegiance: Ba'athist Syria
- Branch: Syrian Armed Forces
- Rank: Brigadier General
- Commands: Head of Hameish military hospital
- Conflicts: Syrian civil war

Dr. Issa al-Khouli (Arabic: عيسى الخولي) was a physician and Syrian Armed Forces brigadier general who was assassinated by three gunmen on 11 February 2012, as he stepped out his house in the neighborhood of Rukn-Eddin in Damascus. He is believed to have been the nephew of Muhammad al-Khuli, the former head of the Air Force Intelligence Directorate. He is the first high military officer who was killed in the Syrian capital since the uprising against President Bashar al-Assad.

== Career ==
Issa al-Khouli, an Alawite from a family with close ties inside the Assad government, trained in Romania and France. He was a specialist in physical therapy and prosthetic devices.
