= Ibrahim Huweija =

Head of Syria's air force intelligence from 1987 to 2002

- إبراهيم حويجة

Chief of Air Force Intelligence
- In office 1987–2002
- Preceded by: Muhammad al-Khuli
- Succeeded by: Iz a-Din Isma'il

Personal details
- Born: Ayn Shiqaq, Syria

Military service
- Allegiance: Ba'athist Syria
- Branch/service: Syrian Arab Air Force
- Battles/wars: Lebanese Civil War; Syrian civil war; March 2025 Western Syria clashes

Ibrahim Huweija (Arabic: إبراهيم حويجة) is a Syrian former intelligence officer who served as head of the Air Force Intelligence Directorate from 1987 until 2002 and was accused in the 1977 murder of Kamal Jumblatt.

== Early life ==
Ibrahim Huweija was born in the village of Ayn Shiqaq near Jableh.

== Role during the Assad regime ==
He first served as an officer under Hafez al-Assad and was promoted to the head of the Air Force Intelligence Directorate, which he served from 1987 until 2002, when he was "dismissed" by Bashar al-Assad.

Walid Jumblatt, the head of the Lebanese Progressive Socialist Party, accused Huweija of involvement in the 1977 murder of Kamal Jumblatt, his father, while testifying before the Special Tribunal for Lebanon in 2015.

Huweija was also accused of other assassinations.

== Capture ==
Huweija was captured in Jableh in March 2025, during the March 2025 Western Syria clashes.
