= Muhammad al-Khuli =

Syrian politician (1937–2026)

Muhammad al-Khouli
- محمد الخولي
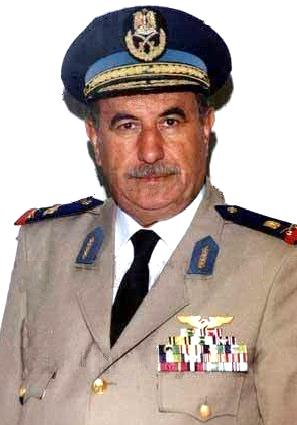
- Official portrait, 1990

Deputy Chief of the Syrian Arab Air Force
- In office 1964–1970

Chief of Air Force Intelligence
- In office 1970–1987
- Preceded by: post established
- Succeeded by: Ibrahim Huweija

Chief of the Syrian Arab Air Force
- In office 1994–1999
- Preceded by: Ali Malahafji

Personal details
- Born: 27 June 1937 Beit Yashout, Syria
- Died: 3 March 2026 (aged 88) Beirut, Lebanon

Military service
- Allegiance: Ba'athist Syria
- Branch: Syrian Arab Air Force
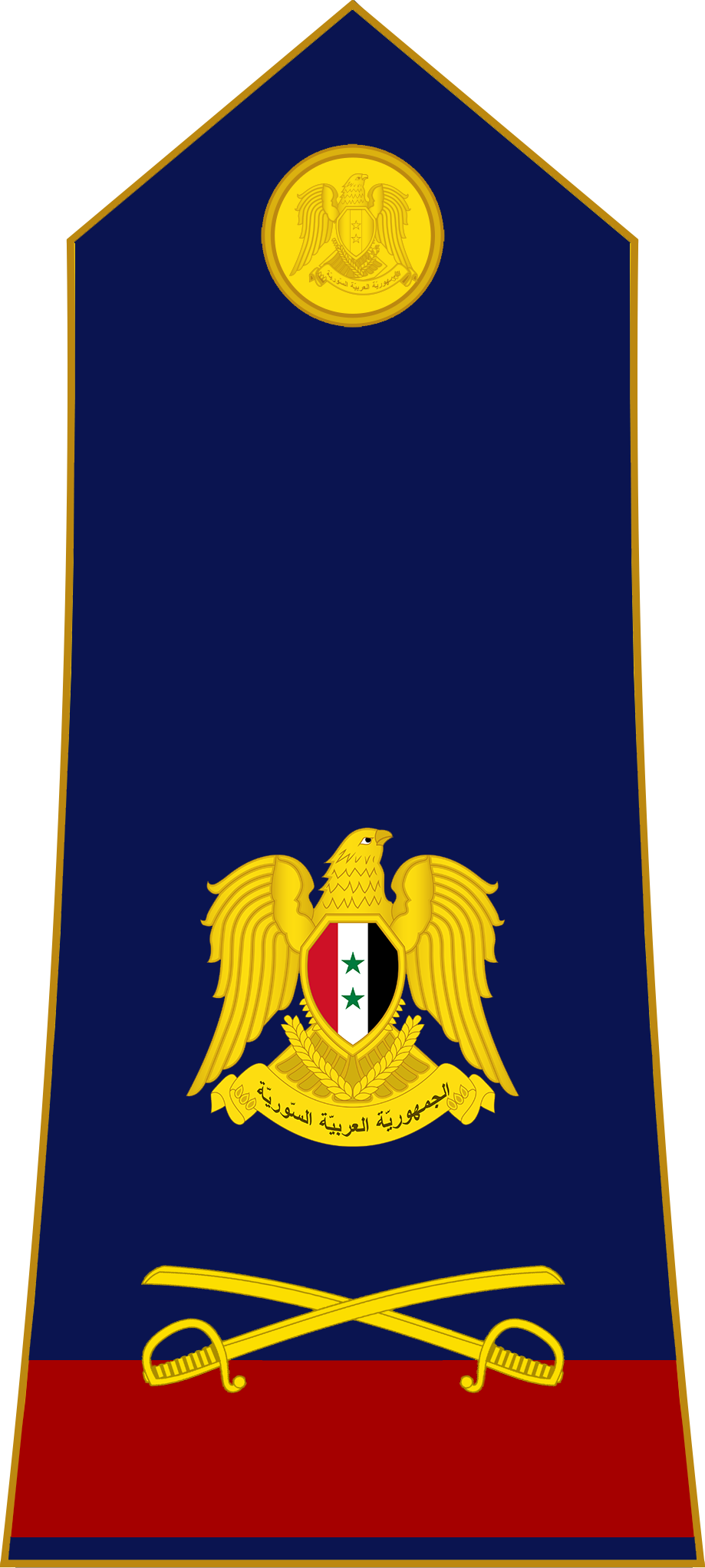
- Rank: Major General
- Conflicts: Six-Day War; Yom Kippur War

Muhammad al-Khouli (Arabic: محمد الخولي27 June 1937 – 3 March 2026) was a Syrian military officer who served as the chief of the Syrian Arab Air Force and the director of the Air Force Intelligence Directorate throughout the presidency of Hafez al-Assad.

== Early life ==
Al-Khouli was born in Beit Yashout in 1937 to an Alawite family descending from the Hadadeen tribe, near the coastal city of Jableh. Information on his early life is scarce, although it is known that he was not involved, nor interested, in the Ba'ath Party which took power in Syria in March 1963.

== Career ==
=== Early service ===
In 1964, al-Khouli was appointed Deputy Chief of the Syrian Air Force under Hafez al-Assad. When al-Assad ousted the government of Nureddin al-Atassi and Salah Jadid in 1970, he appointed al-Khuli Chief of Air Force Intelligence. Between 1971 and 1973 he underwent training in East Germany under both the GDR Air Force and the Stasi. Eventually, he gained the additional prominent position of Chairman of the Presidential Intelligence Committee. Under al-Khuli's leadership, Air Force Intelligence became a powerful apparatus largely independent from scrutiny and tasked with assignments beyond its traditional roles. Practically, it oversaw the nominating of posts throughout Syria's intelligence networks and those networks' undercover activities.

=== Hindawi affair ===
Following the attempted April 1986 bombing of an Israeli El Al plane at London's Heathrow Airport in what became known as the Hindawi affair, al-Khouli was dismissed from his intelligence post in 1987. He was transferred to his old post as Deputy Chief of the Air Force. Hafez al-Assad likely dismissed al-Khouli as a result of international pressure led by the United States and the United Kingdom, the latter of which had severed diplomatic relations with Syria as a result of the incident.

Al-Khouli remained close to al-Assad as a presidential adviser and still maintained strong influence within the Air Force Intelligence apparatus. Indeed, his successor, Ibrahim Huweija, belonged to the same tribe and has been described by some Syrians as "al-Khouli's creature." According to historian Hanna Batatu, "it is not unlikely that al-Khouli decided to take ultimate responsibility for imprudence or missteps by Air Intelligence and to consent to the semblance of presidential disfavor in the higher interest of the regime."

=== Air Force Commander ===
In 1994 President Assad promoted al-Khuli to Commander of the Air Force as indicated by sources in the Syrian press. His appointment, which coincided with efforts by the Syrian government to improve ties with the West, was a surprise to observers due to al-Khuli's alleged role in the Hindawi affair. Historian Moshe Ma'oz explains the move as a possible attempt by al-Assad to secure the "foundations" of his government during difficult times by promoting a loyal confidant such as al-Khuli who could also be relied on to support al-Assad in his bid to nominate Bashar al-Assad as successor to the presidency.

== Later life and death ==
Al-Khouli retired from service in June 1999, at the age of 66. Batatu asserts that al-Khuli was not tainted by official corruption or abuse of authority. He is mostly depicted as "upright, competent and deep in Assad's confidence." However, al-Khouli has been accused of influencing al-Assad to strongly rely on fellow Alawites. In 1988 an opponent of the Assad government and a former secretary-general of the Ba'ath Party was quoted by Batatu as stating "It is possible that it was he who pushed Assad towards the slippery path of sectarianism. But he is a man with a horizon."

During the fall of Baathist Syria al-Khuli fled the country to neighboring Lebanon, ultimately settling in Beirut. He died there on 3 March 2026.

== Bibliography ==
- Batatu, Hanna (1999). Syria's Peasantry, the Descendants of Its Lesser Rural Notables, and Their Politics. Princeton University Press. ISBN 0691002541.
- Ma'oz, Moshe (1999). Modern Syria: From Ottoman Rule to Pivotal Role in the Middle East. Sussex Academic Press. ISBN 1898723834.
- Reich, Bernard (1990). Political Leaders of the Contemporary Middle East and North Africa: A Biographical Dictionary. Greenwood Publishing Group. ISBN 0313262136.
- Maddy-Weitzman, Bruce (2002). Middle East Contemporary Survey. Vol. 23. Moshe Dayan Center. ISBN 9652240494.
