= Hafez al-Assad =

President of Syria from 1971 to 2000

- حافظ الأسد
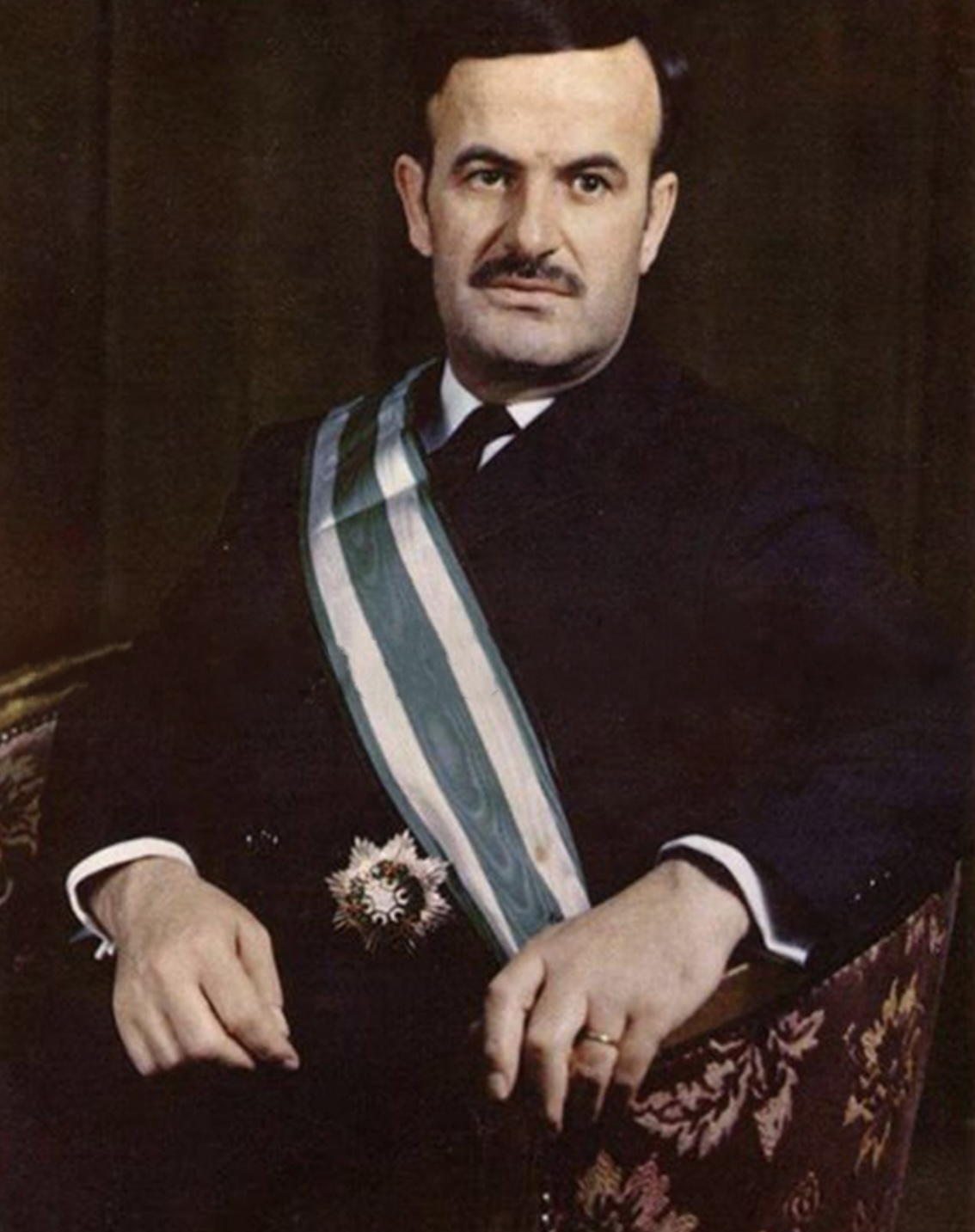
- Official portrait, 1978

President of Syria
- In office 12 March 1971 – 10 June 2000
- Prime Minister: See list: Himself Abdul Rahman Khleifawi Mahmoud al-Ayyubi Abdul Rahman Khleifawi Muhammad Ali al-Halabi Abdul Rauf al-Kasm Mahmoud Al-Zoubi Muhammad Mustafa Mero
- Vice President: See list: Mahmoud al-Ayyubi (1971–1976) Rifaat al-Assad (1984–1998) Abdul Halim Khaddam (1984–2000) Zuhair Masharqa (1984–2000)
- Preceded by: Nureddin al-Atassi; Ahmad al-Khatib (acting)
- Succeeded by: Abdul Halim Khaddam (acting); Bashar al-Assad

Prime Minister of Syria
- In office 21 November 1970 – 3 April 1971
- President: Ahmad al-Khatib (acting); Himself
- Preceded by: Nureddin al-Atassi
- Succeeded by: Abdul Rahman Khleifawi

Secretary General of the National Command of the Arab Socialist Ba'ath Party
- In office 12 September 1971 – 10 June 2000
- Deputy: Abdullah al-Ahmar
- Preceded by: Nureddin al-Atassi
- Succeeded by: Bashar al-Assad

Regional Secretary of the Regional Command of the Syrian Regional Branch
- In office 18 November 1970 – 10 June 2000
- Deputy: Mohamad Jaber Bajbouj; Zuhair Masharqa; Sulayman Qaddah
- Preceded by: Nureddin al-Atassi
- Succeeded by: Bashar al-Assad

Head of the Temperorary Regional Command of Syria (Note: Following the 1970 coup d'état, Assad served as Syria's de facto leader as the head of the Temperorary Regional Command until 12 March 1971, when he was elected president; he was sworn in on the same day.)
- De facto 18 November 1970 – 12 March 1971
- President: Ahmed al-Khatib (acting)
- Prime Minister: Himself
- Preceded by: Nureddin al-Atassi (as President)
- Succeeded by: Himself (as President)

Minister of Defense
- In office 23 February 1966 – 22 March 1972
- Prime Minister: Yusuf Zuaiyin; Nureddin al-Atassi; Himself; Abdul Rahman Kleifawi
- Preceded by: Muhammad Umran
- Succeeded by: Mustafa Tlass

Member of the Regional Command of the Syrian Regional Branch
- In office 27 March 1966 – 10 June 2000
- In office 5 September 1963 – 4 April 1965

Personal details
- Born: 6 October 1930 Qardaha, Alawite State, Syria
- Died: 10 June 2000 (aged 69) Damascus, Syria
- Resting place: Assad Mausoleum (until 2025); Unknown (since 2025)
- Party: Arab Socialist Ba'ath
- Other political affiliations: Arab Ba'ath (1946–1947) Ba'ath (1947–1966)
- Spouse: Anisa Makhlouf (m. 1957)
- Children: Bushra; Bassel; Bashar; Majd; Maher
- Parent: Ali al-Assad (father)
- Relatives: Assad family
- Education: Homs Military Academy

Military service
- Allegiance: Second Syrian Republic (1952–1958); United Arab Republic (1958–1961); Second Syrian Republic (1961–1963); Ba'athist Syria (1963–2000)
- Branch/service: Syrian Arab Air Force; Syrian Arab Armed Forces
- Years of service: 1952–2000
- Rank: Colonel General
- Commands: Syrian Arab Air Force; Syrian Arab Armed Forces
- Battles/wars: Six-Day War; War of Attrition; Black September; Yom Kippur War; Lebanese Civil War

Hafez al-Assad (Note: /ˈhɑːfɛz ˌæl.əˈsɑːd, - ælˈæsæd/ HAH-fez AL-ə-SAHD, - al-ASS-ad; Arabic: حَافِظُ ٱلْأَسَدِ, romanized: Ḥāfiẓ al-ʾAsad, Levantine Arabic: [ˈħɑːfəzˤ ɛlˈʔɜsɜd], Standard Arabic: [ħaːfɪðˤ alˈʔɐsɐd]) (6 October 1930 – 10 June 2000) was a Syrian politician and military officer who served as the president of Syria from 1971 until his death in 2000. He was previously the prime minister from 1970 to 1971 as well as the regional secretary of the regional command of the Syrian regional branch of the Arab Socialist Ba'ath Party and secretary general of the National Command of the Ba'ath Party from 1970 until his death. Assad was a key participant in the 1963 Syrian coup d'état, which brought the Syrian regional branch of the Arab Socialist Ba'ath Party to power. The party ruled for over six decades until it was overthrown in 2024, under the leadership of his son Bashar al-Assad.

After the 1963 coup, the new leadership appointed Assad as the commander of the Syrian Arab Air Force. In February 1966, Assad participated in a second coup, which toppled the leaders of the Ba'ath Party. Assad was appointed defense minister by the new government. Four years later Assad initiated a third coup, which ousted the quasi-Marxist regime of Salah Jadid, and appointed himself as leader of Syria. Assad imposed various changes to the Ba'athist foreign policy after seizing power, such as abandoning Jadid's policy of exporting "socialist revolution" and strengthening Syria's foreign relations with countries that his predecessor had deemed reactionary. Assad made alliances with the Soviet Union and the Eastern Bloc during the Cold War in return for among other things, opposing Israel, while maintaining ties with some Western European and Gulf states. While he officially kept the pan-Arab concept of unifying the Arab world into one "Arab nation" as he termed it, such as being part of the Federation of Arab Republics, he sought to paint Syria as the defender of the Palestinians against Israel, though his support for the Palestinians, particularly the Palestine Liberation Organization (PLO) in Lebanon, was weak.

Assad quickly consolidated his power. Following the death of Gamal Abdel Nasser, the leader of Egypt, Assad sought to reconcile Syrian relations with other Arab countries, that were weakened by Jadid. He also tried to form new ties with countries from both sides in the Cold War. Syria received economic support from OPEC members during the 1973 oil embargo, in part for his hostility toward Israel in the 1973 Yom Kippur War. While Syria remained a one-party system, Ba'athist decision-making authority that had attempted to be collegial was eliminated in favor of absolute Presidential control of the country. To maintain his rule, a cult of personality centered on Assad and his family was created by the president and the Ba'ath party. Assad ordered an Arabization campaign of the Kurdish areas of Syria. Syria then invaded Lebanon with 30,000 troops in 1976, which resulted in the Syrian occupation of Lebanon. The occupation of Lebanon was an attempt to back the weakened Maronite Christians against the PLO (whom he previously claimed to back), and other leftist militias. During his rule, his regime crushed an Islamist uprising led by the Syrian Muslim Brotherhood through a series of crackdowns that culminated in the Hama massacre, which led to two thirds of the city of Hama being destroyed. His regime committed numerous human rights violations, including the massacres of 30,000 men, women and children in Hama alone.

Assad's initial preferred successor as president was his brother Rifaat, but he was exiled after attempting to seize power in 1984 in response to Hafez suffering a health scare. Assad's next choice of successor was his eldest son, Bassel. However, Bassel died in a high-speed car crash in 1994, and Assad turned to his third choice—his younger son Bashar, who at that time was a medical student in the UK, with no political experience. The move to appoint a member of his own family as his successor was met with criticism in some quarters of the Syrian ruling class, but Assad persisted with his plan and demoted officials who opposed this succession. Assad died in office on 11 June 2000 and Bashar succeeded him as president.

== Early life, education and early career ==
=== Early life ===
Hafez al-Assad was born on 6 October 1930, in Qardaha, a town in northwest Syria. He was born into a poor Alawite peasant family belonging to the Kalbiyya tribe of Alawites. Later, Assad recalled at the congresses of the Peasants' General Union: "I had a passion for threshing the harvest... But I took part in all the phases of farming..., lived your emotions and understand what your life signifies. I still have mental pictures of the injustices of the time. No matter how far the past sinks away, it is necessary to keep these images alive in our minds, not to nurse hatred against anyone but to see into them, for what we endured forms an essential part of the way we view things and of the foundation on which we build the present and the future."

His paternal grandfather, Sulayman al-Wahhish, gained the nickname al-Wahhish (wild beast) for his strength. Hafez al-Assad's parents were Na'isa Shalish and Ali al-Assad. His father married twice and had eleven children. Hafez was his ninth son and the fourth from his second marriage.

By the 1920s, Ali was respected locally and was opposed to the Mandate for Syria and the Lebanon, a French-ruled League of Nations mandate officially established in 1923. Nevertheless, Ali Sulayman later cooperated with the French administration and was appointed to an official post. Local residents called him "al-Assad" (the lion) for his accomplishments and, in 1927, he made the nickname his surname.

=== Education and early political career ===
Alawites initially opposed a united Syrian state, believing that their status as a religious minority would endanger them. After the French left Syria in 1946, many Syrians mistrusted the Alawites because of their alignment with France. Assad left his Alawite village, beginning his education at the age of nine in Sunni-dominated Latakia. He became the first in his family to attend high school, but in Latakia, Assad faced anti-Alawite bias from Sunnis. He was an excellent student, winning several prizes at around the age of 14. Assad lived in a poor, predominantly Alawite part of Latakia; he even had to interrupt his studies for a while, since his father did not have enough money to pay for it (but later he was able to return). Interested in political action, he approached political parties that welcomed Alawites. These parties (which also espoused secularism) were the Syrian Communist Party, the Syrian Social Nationalist Party (SSNP) and the Arab Ba'ath Party; Assad joined the Ba'ath in 1946, whereas some of his friends belonged to the SSNP. The Ba'ath (Renaissance) Party espoused a pan-Arabist, socialist ideology.

Assad proved an asset to the party, organizing Ba'ath student cells and carrying the party's message to the poor sections of Latakia and to Alawite villages. He was opposed by the Muslim Brotherhood, which allied itself with wealthy and conservative Sunni Muslim families. Assad's high school accommodated students from rich and poor families, and Assad was joined by poor, anti-establishment Sunni Muslim youth from the Ba'ath Party in confrontations with students from wealthy Brotherhood families. He made many Sunni friends, some of whom later became his political allies.

While still a teenager, Assad became increasingly prominent in the party as an organizer and recruiter. He acted as head of his school's student-affairs committee from 1949 to 1951 and president of the Union of Syrian Students. During his political activism in school, he met many men who would later serve him when he became president. Thanks to Assad and his comrades, the regional Ba'ath Party branch, through demonstrations and boycotts, succeeded in nationalizing the formerly French-controlled tobacco company "La Compagnie Libano-Syrienne des Tabacs," also known as Rôgie, in 1951. The company had already earned the hatred of the residents of Latakia for its total control over the most profitable and fertile lands, control over prices for its products, and its monopoly.

== Air Force career: 1950–1958 ==
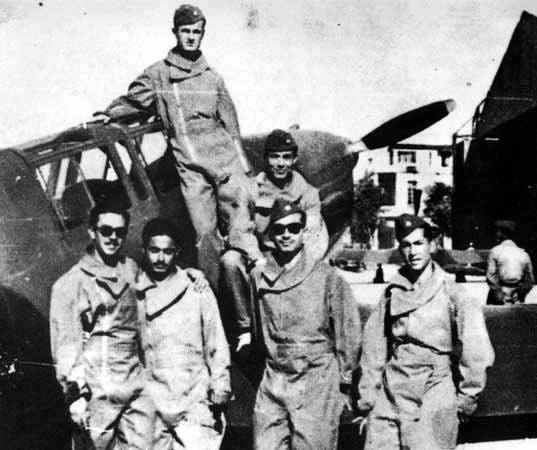
Hafez al-Assad (above) standing on the wing of a Fiat G.46-4B with fellow cadets at the Syrian AF Academy outside Aleppo, 1951–52

After he was graduated from high school, Assad aspired to be a medical doctor, but his father could not pay for his study at the Jesuit Saint Joseph University in Beirut. Instead, in 1950, he decided to join the Syrian Armed Forces. Assad entered the Homs Military Academy, which offered free food, lodging and a stipend. He wanted to fly, and entered the flying school in Aleppo in 1950.

Assad was graduated in 1955, after which he was commissioned a lieutenant in the Syrian Air Force. Upon graduation from flying school, he won a best-aviator trophy, and shortly afterwards was assigned to the Mezzeh air base near Damascus. He married Anisa Makhlouf in 1957, a relative of the powerful Makhlouf family.

In 1955, the military split in a revolt against President Adib Shishakli. Hashim al-Atassi, head of the National Bloc and briefly president after Sami al-Hinnawi's coup, returned as president and Syria was again under civilian rule. After 1955, Atassi's hold on the country was increasingly shaky. As a result of the 1955 election, Atassi was replaced by Shukri al-Quwatli, who was president before Syria's independence from France. The Ba'ath Party grew closer to the Communist Party not because of shared ideology, but a shared opposition to the West. At the academy, Assad met Mustafa Tlass, his future minister of Defense.

In 1955, Assad was sent to Egypt for a further six months of training. When Gamal Abdel Nasser nationalised the Suez Canal in 1956, Syria feared retaliation from the United Kingdom, and Assad flew in an air-defense mission. He was among the Syrian pilots who flew to Cairo to show Syria's commitment to Egypt. After finishing a course in Egypt the following year, Assad returned to a small airbase near Damascus. During the Suez Crisis, he also flew a reconnaissance mission over northern and eastern Syria. In 1957, as squadron commander, Assad was sent to the Soviet Union for training in the MiG-17. He spent ten months in the Soviet Union, during which he fathered a daughter (who died as an infant while he was abroad) with his wife.

In 1958, Syria and Egypt formed the United Arab Republic (UAR), separating themselves from Iraq, Iran, Pakistan, and Turkey (who were aligned with the United Kingdom). This pact led to the rejection of Communist influence in favour of Egyptian control over Syria. All Syrian political parties (including the Ba'ath Party) were dissolved, and senior officers—especially those who supported the Communists—were dismissed from the Syrian armed forces. Assad, however, remained in the military and rose quickly through the ranks. After reaching the rank of captain, he was transferred to Egypt, continuing his military education with the future president of Egypt, Hosni Mubarak.

== Runup to 1963 coup: 1958–1963 ==
Assad was not content with a professional military career, regarding it rather as a gateway to politics. After the creation of the UAR, Ba'ath Party leader Michel Aflaq was forced by Nasser to dissolve the party. During the UAR's existence, the Ba'ath Party experienced a crisis for which several of its members—mostly young—blamed Aflaq. To resurrect the Syrian Regional Branch of the party, Muhammad Umran, Salah Jadid, Assad and others established the Military Committee. In 1957–58 Assad rose to a dominant position in the Military Committee, which mitigated his transfer to Egypt. After Syria left the UAR in September 1961, Assad and other Ba'athist officers were removed from the military by the new government in Damascus, and he was given a minor clerical position at the Ministry of Transport.

Assad played a minor role in the failed 1962 military coup, for which he was jailed in Lebanon and later repatriated. That year, Aflaq convened the 5th National Congress of the Ba'ath Party (where he was re-elected as the Secretary-General of the National Command) and ordered the re-establishment of the party's Syrian Regional Branch. At the Congress, the Military Committee (through Umran) established contacts with Aflaq and the civilian leadership. The committee requested permission to seize power by force, and Aflaq agreed to the conspiracy. After the success of the Iraqi coup d'état led by the Ba'ath Party's Iraqi Regional Branch, the Military Committee hastily convened to launch a Ba'athist military coup in March 1963 against President Nazim al-Qudsi which Assad helped plan.

The coup was scheduled for 7 March, but postponed until the next day. During the coup Assad led a small group to capture the Dumayr airbase, 40 kilometres (25 mi) northeast of Damascus. His group was the only one that encountered resistance. Some planes at the base were ordered to bomb the conspirators, and because of this Assad hurried to reach the base before dawn. Because the 70th Armored Brigade's surrender took longer than anticipated, however, he arrived in broad daylight. When Assad threatened the base commander with shelling, the commander negotiated a surrender; Assad later claimed that the base could have withstood his forces.

== Early Ba'ath Party rule: 1963–1970 ==
=== Aflaqite leadership: 1963–1966 ===
==== Military work ====
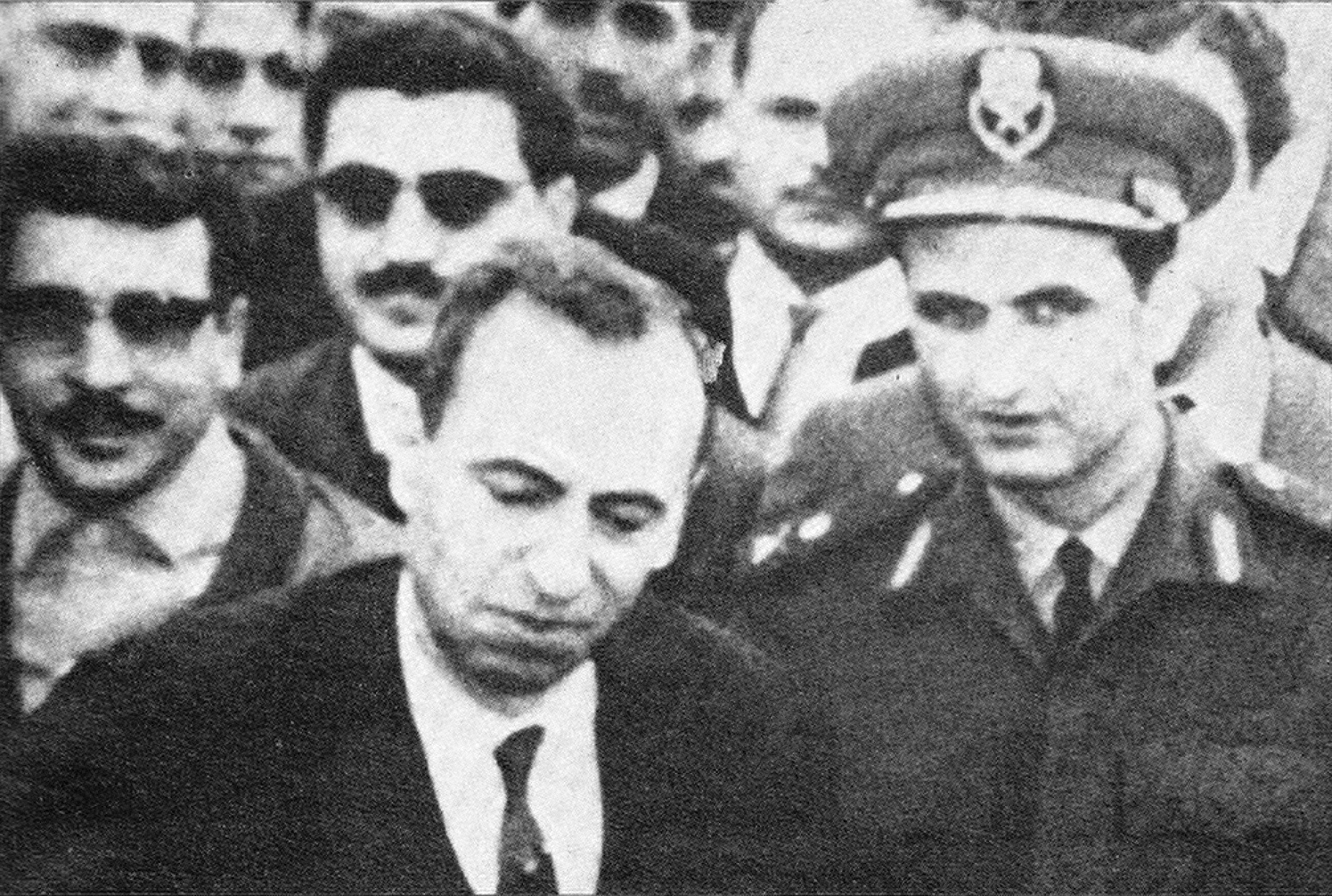
Michel Aflaq and Salah Jadid, 1963

Not long after Assad's election to the Regional Command, the Military Committee ordered him to strengthen the committee's position in the military establishment. Assad may have received the most important job of all, since his primary goal was to end factionalism in the Syrian military and make it a Ba'ath monopoly; as he said, he had to create an "ideological army". To help with this task, Assad recruited Zaki al-Arsuzi, who indirectly (through Wahib al-Ghanim) inspired him to join the Ba'ath Party when he was young. Arsuzi accompanied Assad on tours of military camps, where Arsuzi lectured the soldiers on Ba'athist thought. In gratitude for his work, Assad gave Arsuzi a government pension. Assad continued his Ba'athification of the military by appointing loyal officers to key positions and ensuring that the "political education of the troops was not neglected". He demonstrated his skill as a patient planner during this period. As Patrick Seale wrote, Assad's mastery of detail "suggested the mind of an intelligence officer".

By the end of 1964 Assad was named commander of the Air Force, with the rank of major general. He gave privileges to Air Force officers, appointed his confidants to senior and sensitive positions and established an efficient intelligence network. Air Force Intelligence, under the command of Muhammad al-Khuli, became independent of Syria's other intelligence organizations and received assignments beyond Air Force jurisdiction. Assad prepared himself for an active role in the power struggles that lay ahead.

==== Power struggle and 1966 coup ====
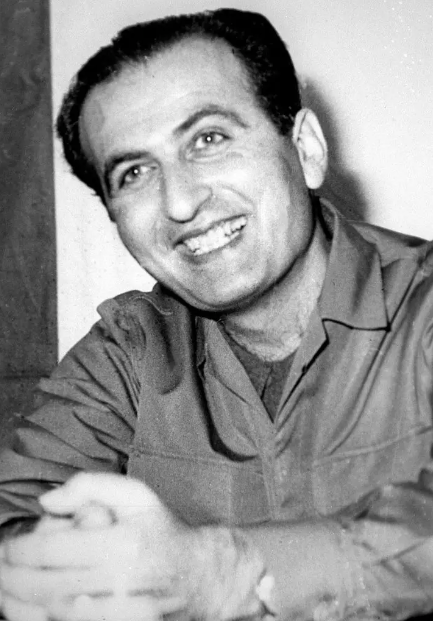
General Salah Jadid, who launched a 1966 coup together with Assad.

In the aftermath of the 1963 coup, at the First Regional Congress (held 5 September 1963) Assad was elected to the Syrian Regional Command (the highest decision-making body in the Syrian Regional Branch). While not a leadership role, it was Assad's first appearance in national politics. In retrospect, he said he positioned himself "on the left" in the Regional Command. Khalid al-Falhum, a Palestinian who would later work for the Palestine Liberation Organization (PLO), met Assad in 1963; he noted that Assad was a strong leftist "but was clearly not a communist", committed instead to Arab nationalism.

During the 1964 Hama riot, Assad voted to suppress the uprising violently if needed. The decision to suppress the Hama riot led to a schism in the Military Committee between Muhammad Umran and Jadid. Umran opposed force, instead wanting the Ba'ath Party to create a coalition with other pan-Arab forces. Jadid desired a strong one-party state, similar to those in the communist countries of Europe. Assad, as a junior partner, reserved his opinion at first but eventually allied himself with Jadid. Why Assad chose to side with him has been widely discussed; he probably shared Jadid's radical ideological outlook. Having lost his footing on the Military Committee, Umran aligned himself with Aflaq and the National Command; he told them that the Military Committee was planning to seize power in the party by ousting them. Because of Umran's defection, Rifaat al-Assad (Hafez's brother) succeeded Umran as commander of a secret military force tasked with protecting Military Committee loyalists.

In its bid to seize power the Military Committee allied themselves with the regionalists, a group of cells in the Syrian Regional Branch that refused to disband in 1958 when ordered to do so. Although Aflaq considered these cells traitors, Assad called them the "true cells of the party." This again highlighted differences between the Military Committee and the National Command headed by Aflaq. At the Eighth National Congress in 1965 Assad was elected to the National Command, the party's highest decision-making body. From his position as part of the National Command, Assad informed Jadid on its activities. After the congress, the National Command dissolved the Syrian Regional Command; Aflaq proposed Salah al-Din al-Bitar as prime minister, but Assad and Brahim Makhous opposed Bitar's nomination. According to Seale, Assad abhorred Aflaq; he considered him an autocrat and a rightist, accusing him of "ditching" the party by ordering the dissolution of the Syrian Regional Branch in 1958. Assad, who also disliked Aflaq's supporters, nevertheless opposed a show of force against the Aflaqites. In response to the imminent coup Assad, Naji Jamil, Husayn Mulhim and Yusuf Sayigh left for London.

In the 1966 Syrian coup d'état, the Military Committee overthrew the National Command. The coup led to a permanent schism in the Ba'ath movement, the advent of neo-Ba'athism and the establishment of two centers of the international Ba'athist movement: one Iraqi- and the other Syrian-dominated.

=== Jadid as strongman: 1966–1970 ===
==== Beginning ====
After the coup, Assad was appointed Minister of Defense. This was his first cabinet post, and through his position, he would be thrust to the forefront of Syrian-Israeli confrontation. His government was radically socialist, and sought to remake society from top to bottom. Assad opposed the headlong rush for change. Despite his position, he had little power in the government and took more orders than he issued. Jadid was the undisputed leader at the time, opting to remain in the office of Assistant Regional Secretary of the Syrian Regional Command instead of taking executive office (which had historically been held by Sunnis). Nureddin al-Atassi was given three of the four top executive positions in the country: President, Secretary-General of the National Command and Regional Secretary of the Syrian Regional Command. The post of prime minister was given to Yusuf Zu'ayyin. Jadid was establishing his authority, though focused on civilian issues and gave Assad de facto control of the Syrian military, considering him no threat.

During the failed coup d'état of late 1966, Salim Hatum tried to overthrow Jadid's government. Hatum (who felt snubbed when he was not appointed to the Regional Command after the February 1966 coup d'état) sought revenge and the return to power of Hammud al-Shufi, the first Regional Secretary of the Regional Command after the Syrian Regional Branch's re-establishment in 1963. When Jadid, Atassi and Regional Command member Jamil Shayya visited Suwayda, forces loyal to Hatum surrounded the city and captured them. In a twist of fate, the city's Druze elders forbade the murder of their guests and demanded that Hatum wait. Jadid and the others were placed under house arrest, with Hatum planning to kill them at his first opportunity. When word of the mutiny spread to the Ministry of Defense, Assad ordered the 70th Armored Brigade to the city. By this time Hatum, a Druze, knew that Assad would order the bombardment of the Druze majority city if Hatum did not accede to his demands. Hatum and his supporters fled to Jordan, where they were given asylum. How Assad learned about the conspiracy is unknown, but Mustafa al-Hajj Ali (head of military intelligence) may have telephoned the Ministry of Defense. Due to his prompt action, Assad earned Jadid's gratitude.

In the aftermath of the attempted coup Assad and Jadid purged the party's military organization, removing 89 officers; Assad removed an estimated 400 officers, Syria's largest military purge to that time. The purges, which began when the Ba'ath Party took power in 1963, left the military weak. As a result, when the Six-Day War broke out, Syria had no chance of victory.

==== Seizing power ====
The Arab defeat in the Six-Day War, in which Israel captured the Golan Heights from Syria, provoked a furious quarrel among Syria's leadership. The civilian leadership blamed military incompetence, and the military responded by criticizing the civilian leadership (led by Jadid). Several high-ranking party members demanded Assad's resignation, and an attempt was made to vote him out of the Regional Command, the party's highest decision-making body. The motion was defeated by one vote, with Abd al-Karim al-Jundi (who the anti-Assad members hoped would succeed Assad as defense minister) voting, as Patrick Seale put it, "in a comradely gesture" to retain him. Assad's failure as defense minister in the war was linked to his insufficient qualifications - after all, he got the job because he was considered a reliable ally of Jadid. Additionally, the horrific weakness of the Syrian army left little chance of victory. At the end of the war, the party leadership freed Aflaqites Umran, Amin al-Hafiz and Mansur al-Atrash from prison. Shortly after his release, Assad was approached by dissident Syrian military officers wanting to oust the government. Assad refused, believing that a coup at that time would have helped Israel, but not Syria.

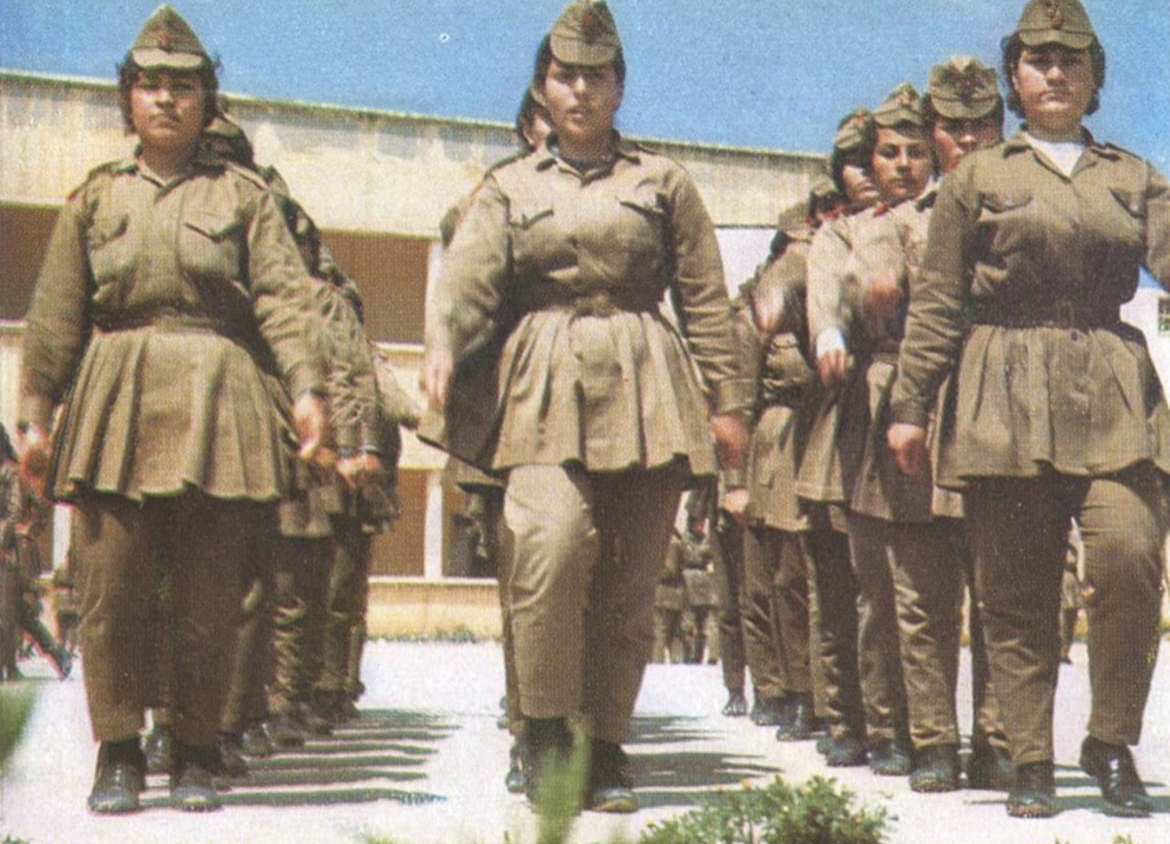
Women serving in the army, 1969

The war was a turning point for Assad (and Ba'athist Syria in general), and his attempted ouster began a power struggle with Jadid for control of the country. Until then Assad had not shown ambition for high office, arousing little suspicion in others. From the 1963 Syrian coup d'état to the Six-Day War in 1967, Assad did not play a leading role in politics and was usually overshadowed by his contemporaries. Patrick Seale wrote, he was "apparently content to be a solid member of the team without the aspiration to become number one". Although Jadid was slow to see Assad's threat, shortly after the war Assad began developing a network in the military and promoted friends and close relatives to high positions.

===== Differences with Jadid =====
Assad believed that Syria's defeat in the Six-Day War was Jadid's fault, and the accusations against Assad were unjust. By this time Jadid had total control of the Regional Command, whose members supported his policies. Assad and Jadid began to differ on policy. Assad believed that Jadid's policy of a people's war (an armed-guerrilla strategy) and class struggle had failed Syria, undermining its position. Although Jadid continued to champion the concept of a people's war even after the Six-Day War, Assad opposed it. He felt that Palestinian guerrilla fighters had been given too much autonomy and had raided Israel constantly, which in turn sparked the war. Jadid had broken diplomatic relations with countries he deemed reactionary, such as Saudi Arabia and Jordan. Because of this, Syria did not receive aid from other Arab countries. Egypt and Jordan, which participated in the war, were awarded £135million per year from Saudi Arabia, Kuwait and Libia at the Khartoum summit for an undisclosed period.

While Jadid and his supporters prioritised socialism and the "internal revolution", Assad wanted the leadership to focus on foreign policy and the containment of Israel. The Ba'ath Party was divided over several issues, such as how the government could best use Syria's limited resources, the ideal relationship between the party and the people, the organization of the party and whether the class struggle should end. These subjects were discussed heatedly in Ba'ath Party conclaves, and when they reached the Fourth Regional Congress the two sides were irreconcilable.

Assad wanted to "democratize" the party by making it easier for people to join. Jadid was wary of too large a membership, believing that the majority of those who joined were opportunists. Assad, in an interview with Patrick Seale in the 1980s, stated that such a policy would make Party members believe they were a privileged class. Another problem, Assad believed, was the lack of local government institutions. Under Jadid, there was no governmental level below the Council of Ministers (the Syrian government). When the Iraqi Regional Branch (which continued to support the Aflaqite leadership) took control of Iraq in the 17 July Revolution, Assad was one of the few high-level politicians wishing to reconcile with them; he called for the establishment of an "Eastern Front" with Iraq against Israel in 1968. Jadid's foreign policy towards the Soviet Union was also criticised by Assad, who believed it had failed. In many ways the relationship between the countries was poor, with the Soviets refusing to acknowledge Jadid's scientific socialism and Soviet newspapers calling him a "hothead". Assad, on the contrary, called for greater pragmatism in decision-making.

===== "Duality of power" =====
At a meeting someone raised the case of X. Should he not be brought back? Assad gave the questioner a hard look but said nothing. A little later the subject came up again and this time Assad said: I've heard something disagreeable about this officer. When he was on a course in England in 1954, his brother wrote asking for help for their sick mother. X took a £5 note out of his pocket, held it up and said he wouldn't part with it to save her life. Anyone who can't be loyal to his mother is not going to be loyal to the air force.

— General Fu'ad Kallas on the importance in which Assad laid on personal loyalty

The conflict between Assad and Jadid became the talk of the army and the party, with a "duality of power" noted between them. Shortly after the failed attempt to expel Assad from the Regional Command, he began to consolidate his position in the military establishment—for example, by replacing Chief of Staff Ahmad al-Suwaydani with his friend Mustafa Tlass. Although Suwaydani's relationship with Jadid had deteriorated, he was removed because of his complaints about "Alawi influence in the army". Tlass was later appointed Assad's Deputy Minister of Defense (his second-in-command). Others removed from their positions were Ahmad al-Mir (a founder and former member of the Military Committee, and former commander of the Golan Front) and Izzat Jadid (a close supporter of Jadid and commander of the 70th Armoured Brigade).

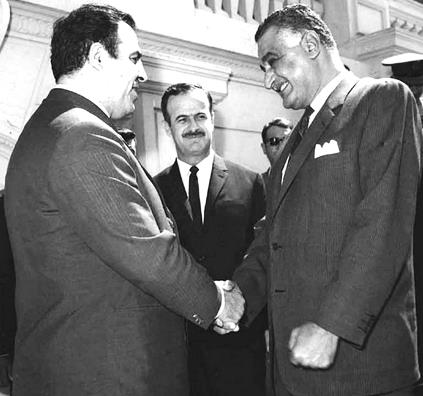
Assad (center) and Nureddin al-Atassi (left) meeting with Egyptian President Gamal Abdel Nasser, 1969

By the Fourth Regional Ba’ath party Congress and Tenth National Congress in September and October 1968, Assad had extended his grip on the army, but Jadid still controlled the party. At both congresses, Assad was outvoted on most issues, and his arguments were firmly rejected. While he failed in most of his attempts, he had enough support to remove two socialist theoreticians (Prime Minister Yusuf Zu'ayyin and Minister of Foreign Affairs Brahim Makhous) from the Regional Command. However, the military's involvement in party politics was unpopular with the rank and file; as the gulf between Assad and Jadid widened, the civilian and military party bodies were forbidden to contact each other. Despite this, Assad was winning the race to accumulate power. As Munif ar-Razzaz (ousted in the 1966 Syrian coup d'état) noted, "Jadid's fatal mistake was to attempt to govern the army through the party".

While Assad had taken control of the armed forces through his position as Minister of Defense, Jadid still controlled the security and intelligence sectors through Abd al-Karim al-Jundi (head of the National Security Bureau). Jundi—a paranoid, cruel man—was feared throughout Syria. In February 1969, the Assad-Jadid conflict erupted in violent clashes through their respective proteges: Rifaat al-Assad (Hafez's brother and a high-ranking military commander) and Jundi. The reason for the violence was Rifaat al-Assad's suspicion that Jundi was planning an attempt on Assad's life. The suspected assassin was interrogated and confessed under torture. Acting on this information, Rifaat al-Assad argued that unless Jundi was removed from his post he and his brother were in danger.

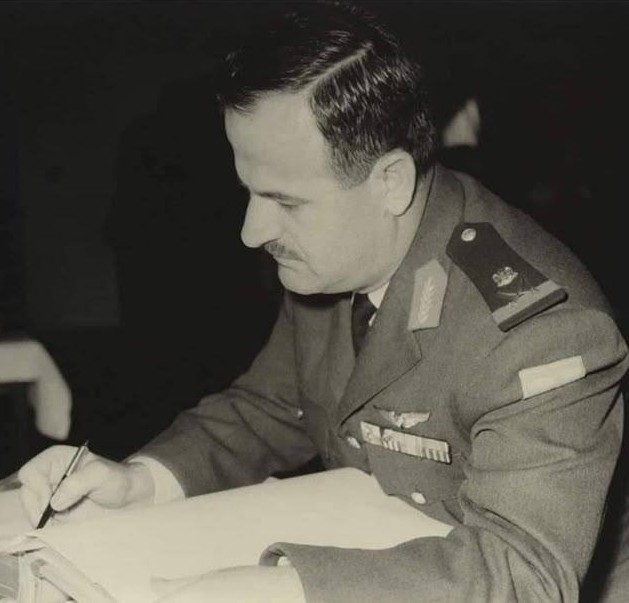
Assad in 1969

From 25 to 28 February 1969, the Assad brothers initiated "something just short of a coup". Under Assad's authority, tanks were moved into Damascus and the staffs of al-Ba'ath and al-Thawra (two Ba’ath party newspapers) and radio stations in Damascus and Aleppo were replaced with Assad loyalists. Latakia and Tartus, two Alawite-dominated cities, saw "fierce scuffles" ending with the overthrow of Jadid's supporters from local posts. Shortly afterwards, a wave of arrests of Jundi loyalists began. On 2 March, after a telephone argument with head of military intelligence Ali Duba, Jundi committed suicide. When Zu'ayyin heard the news he wept, saying "we are all orphaned now" (referring to his and Jadid's loss of their protector). Despite his rivalry with Jundi, Assad is said to have also wept when he heard the news.

Assad was now in control, but he hesitated to push his advantage. Jadid continued to rule Syria, and the Regional Command was unchanged. However, Assad influenced Jadid to moderate his policies. Class struggle was muted, criticism of reactionary tendencies of other Arab states ceased, some political prisoners were freed, a coalition government was formed (with the Ba'ath Party in control) and the Eastern Front espoused by Assad was formed with Iraq and Jordan. Jadid's isolationist policies were curtailed, and Syria re-established diplomatic relations with many of its foes. Around this time, Gamal Abdel Nasser's Egypt, Houari Boumediene's Algeria and Ba'athist Iraq began sending emissaries to reconcile Assad and Jadid.

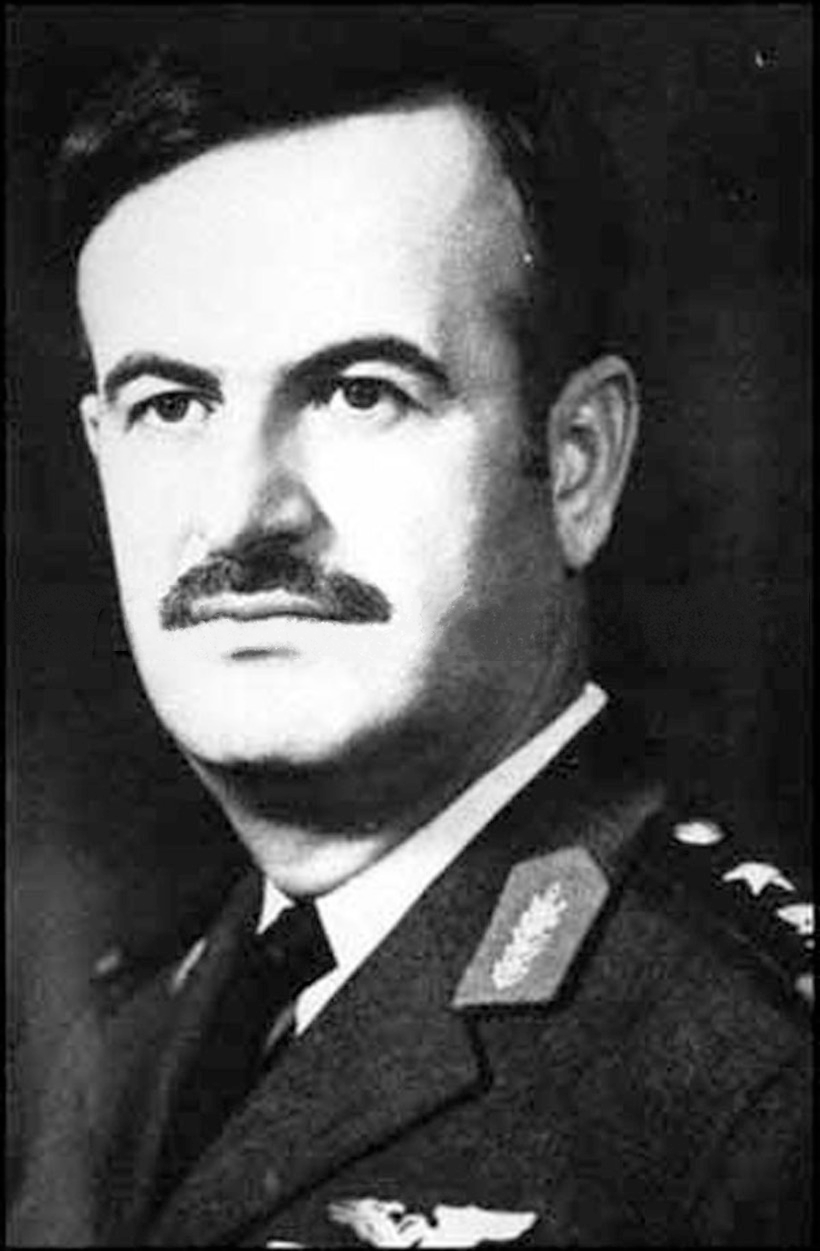
Assad in November 1970, shortly after seizing power

===== 1970 Coup d’etat =====
Assad began planning to seize power shortly after the failed Syrian military intervention in the Black September, a power struggle between the PLO and the Hashemite monarchy of Jordan. While Assad had been in de facto command of Syrian politics since 1969, Jadid and his supporters still held the trappings of power. After attending Nasser's funeral, Assad returned to Syria for the Emergency National Congress (held on 30 October). At the congress Assad was condemned by Jadid and his supporters, the majority of the party's delegates. However, before attending the congress Assad ordered his loyal troops to surround the building housing the meeting. Criticism of Assad's political position continued in a defeatist tone, with the majority of delegates believing that Assad had lost the battle. Assad and Tlass were stripped of their government posts at the congress; these acts had little practical significance.

When the National Congress ended on 12 November 1970, Assad ordered loyalists to arrest leading members of Jadid's government. Although many mid-level officials were offered posts in Syrian embassies abroad, Jadid refused: "If I ever take power, you will be dragged through the streets until you die." Assad imprisoned him in Mezze prison until his death. The coup was calm and bloodless; the only evidence of change to the outside world was the disappearance of newspapers, radio and television stations. A Temporary Regional Command was soon established, and on 16 November the new government published its first decree.

== Premiership and presidency: 1970–2000 ==
=== Domestic events and policies ===
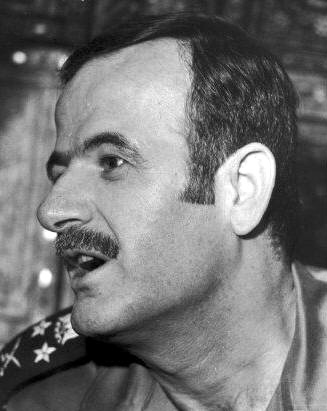
Hafez al-Assad in 1970

==== Consolidating power ====
Assad quickly and successfully consolidated his power in what became known as Assadization. Assad was able to do it thanks to Al-Jama'a, an informal group of Assadist men that formed in the 1960s and remained loyal to Assad, helping him rise to the very top of power. According to Patrick Seale, Assad's rule "began with an immediate and considerable advantage: the government he displaced was so detested that any alternative came as a relief". He first tried to establish national unity, which he felt had been lost under the leadership of Aflaq and Jadid. Assad differed from his predecessor at the outset, visiting local villages and hearing citizen complaints. The Syrian people felt that Assad's rise to power would lead to change. One of his first acts as ruler was to visit Sultan al-Atrash, father of the Aflaqite Ba'athist Mansur al-Atrash, to honor his efforts during the Great Arab Revolution against the Ottoman Turks. He made overtures to the Writers' Union, rehabilitating those who had been forced underground, jailed or sent into exile for representing what radical Ba'athists called the reactionary classes: "I am determined that you shall no longer feel strangers in your own country." Although Assad did not democratize the country, he eased some of the government's repressive policies. Assad was approved as president in a referendum on 12 March 1971 and was formally inaugurated on 14 March. He became the only ruler of Syria who came from a peasant family, which added to his initial popular support. In later years, Assad often cited his peasant origins as evidence of his closeness to the people, especially when he was attacked by his opponents.

He cut prices for basic foodstuffs 15 percent, which won him support from ordinary citizens. He lived in a modest house and worked 15 hours a day. Jadid's security services were purged, some military criminal investigative powers were transferred to the police, and the confiscation of goods under Jadid was reversed. Restrictions on travel to and trade with Lebanon were eased, and Assad encouraged growth in the private sector. While Assad supported most of Jadid's policies, he proved more pragmatic after he came to power.

Most of Jadid's supporters faced a choice: continue working for the Ba'ath government under Assad, or face repression. Assad made it clear from the beginning "that there would be no second chances". However, later in 1970, he recruited support from the Ba'athist old guard who had supported Aflaq's leadership during the 1963–1966 power struggle. An estimated 2,000 former Ba'athists rejoined the party after hearing Assad's appeal, among them party ideologist Georges Saddiqni and Shakir al-Fahham, a secretary of the founding, 1st National Congress of the Ba'ath Party in 1947. Assad ensured that they would not defect to the pro-Aflaqite Ba'ath Party in Iraq with the Treason Trials in 1971, in which he prosecuted Aflaq, Amin al-Hafiz and nearly 100 followers (most in absentia). The few who were convicted were not imprisoned long, and the trials were primarily symbolic.

At the 11th National Ba’ath Congress, Assad assured party members that his leadership was a radical change from that of Jadid, and he would implement a "corrective movement" to return Syria to the true "nationalist socialist line". Unlike Jadid, Assad emphasised "the advancement of which all resources and manpower [would be] mobilised [for] the liberation of the occupied territories". This would mark a major break with his predecessors and would, according to Raymond Hinnebusch, dictate "major alterations in the course of the Ba'thist state".

==== Institutionalization ====
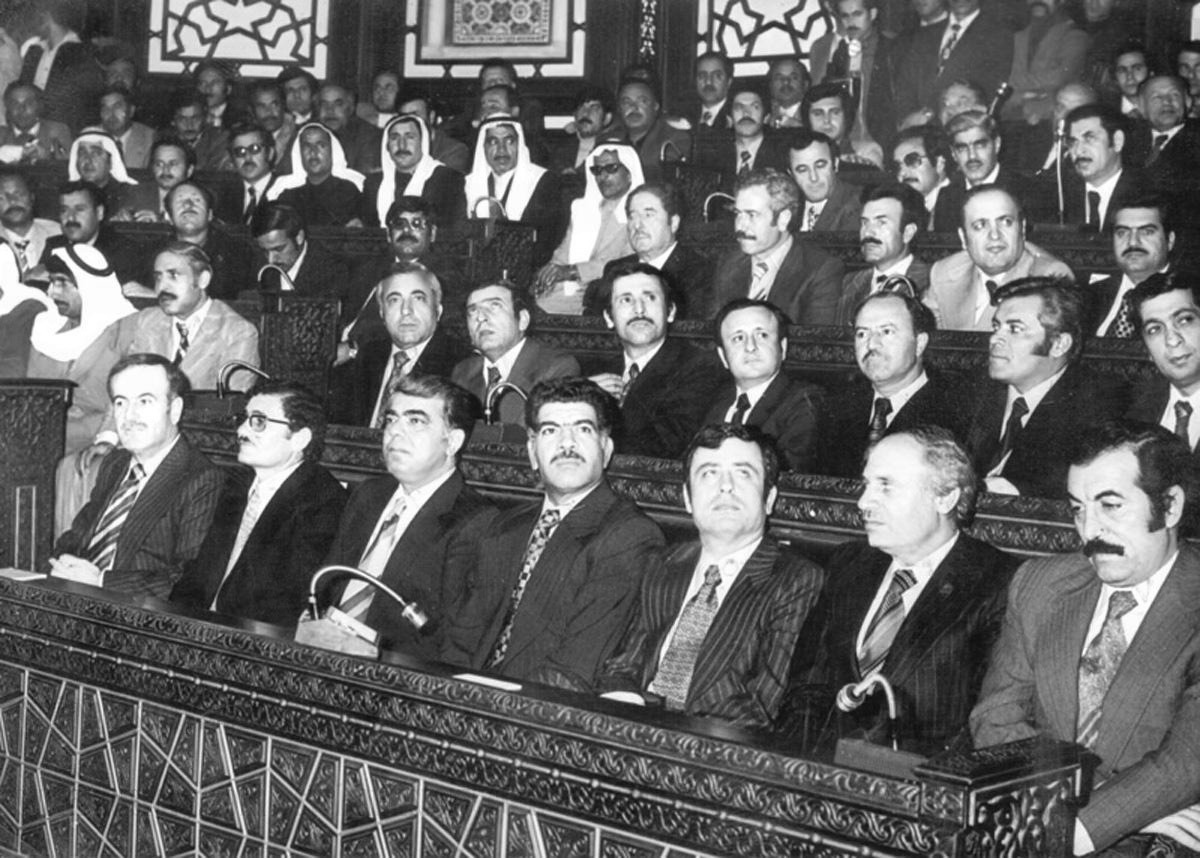
Assad's first inauguration as president in the People's Council, March 1971. L–R: Assad, Abdullah al-Ahmar, Prime Minister Abdul Rahman Khleifawi, Assistant Regional Secretary Mohamad Jaber Bajbouj, Foreign Minister Abdul Halim Khaddam and People's Council Speaker Fihmi al-Yusufi. In the third civilian row are Defense Minister Mustafa Tlass (MP in the 1971 Parliament) and Air Force Commander Naji Jamil. Behind Tlass is Rifaat al-Assad, Assad's younger brother. On the far right in the fourth row is future vice president Zuhair Masharqa, and behind Abdullah al-Ahmar is Deputy Prime Minister Mohammad Haidar.

Assad turned the presidency, which had been known simply as "head of state" under Jadid, into a position of power during his rule. In many ways, the presidential authority replaced the Ba'ath Party's failed experiment with organised, military Leninism; Syria became a hybrid of Leninism and Gaullist constitutionalism. According to Raymond Hinnebusch, "as the president became the main source of initiative in the government, his personality, values, strengths, and weaknesses became decisive for its direction and stability. Arguably Assad's leadership gave the government an enhanced combination of consistency and flexibility which it hitherto lacked."

Assad institutionalised a system where he had the final say, which weakened the institutions of the state and party. As fidelity to the leader replaced ideological conviction later in his presidency, corruption became even more widespread. The state-sponsored cult of personality became pervasive; as Assad's authority strengthened at his colleagues' expense, he became the sole symbol of the government.

While Assad did not rule alone, he increasingly had the last word; those with whom he worked eventually became lieutenants, rather than colleagues. None of the political elite would question a decision of his, and those who did were dismissed or murdered. General Naji Jamil is an example, being dismissed after he disagreed with Assad's handling of the Islamist uprising. The two highest decision-making bodies were the Regional Command and the National Command, both part of the Ba'ath Party. Joint sessions of these bodies resembled politburos in communist states. Assad headed the National Command and the Regional Command as Secretary General and Regional Secretary, respectively. The Regional Command was the highest decision-making body in Syria, appointing the president and (through him) the cabinet. As presidential authority strengthened, the power of the Regional Command and its members evaporated. The Regional and National Commands were nominally responsible to the Regional Congress and the National Congress—with the National Congress the de jure superior body—but the Regional Congress had de facto authority. The National Congress, which included delegates from Ba'athist Regional Branches in other countries, has been compared to the Comintern. It functioned as a session of the Regional Congress focusing on Syria's foreign policy and party ideology. The Regional Congress had limited accountability until the 1985 Eighth Regional Congress, the last under Assad. In 1985, responsibility for leadership accountability was transferred from the Regional Congress to the weaker National Progressive Front.

==== The Economy of Assad ====
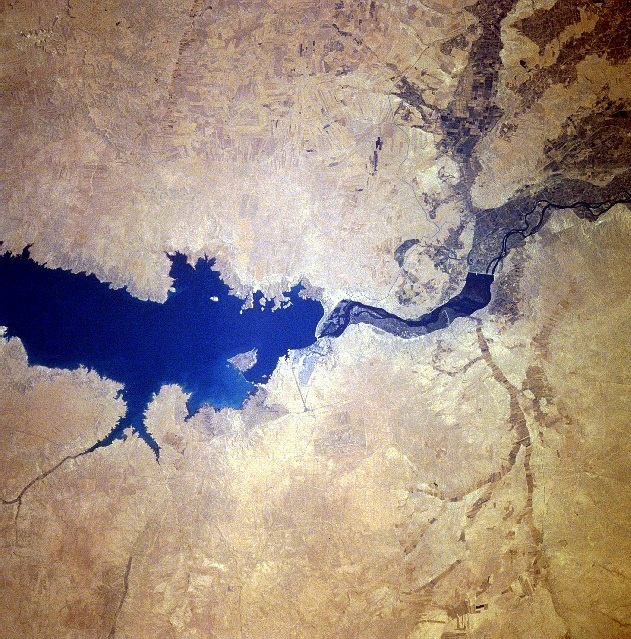
Tabqa Dam (center), built-in 1974

Assad called his domestic reforms a Corrective Movement, and it achieved some positive results. He introduced Ta'addudiyya and Infiraj policies, aimed at limited economic and political liberalization. He tried to modernize Syria's agricultural and industrial sectors; one of his main achievements was the completion of the Tabqa Dam on the Euphrates River in 1974. One of the world's largest dams, its reservoir was called Lake al-Assad. The reservoir increased the irrigation of arable land, provided electricity, and encouraged industrial and technical development in Syria. Many peasants and workers received increased income, social security, and better health and educational services. The urban middle class, which had been hurt by the Jadid government policy, were afforded new economic opportunities.

By 1977 it was apparent that despite some success, Assad's political reforms had largely failed. This was partly due to Assad's foreign policy, failed policies, natural phenomena, and corruption. Chronic socioeconomic difficulties remained, and new ones appeared. Inefficiency, mismanagement, and corruption in the government, public, and private sectors increased. Illiteracy, poor education (particularly in rural areas), increasing emigration by professionals, inflation, a growing trade deficit, inflation and shortages of consumer goods were among the multitude of problems faced by the citizens of Syria. The financial burden of Syria's involvement in Lebanon since 1976 contributed to worsening economic problems, encouraging corruption and the black market. The Fourth Five-Year Plan (1976-1980) set ambitious goals but failed to achieve most of them, as well as Fifth (1981-1985) and Sixth (1986-1990) Plans. The emerging class of entrepreneurs and brokers became involved with senior military officers—including Assad's brother Rifaat—in smuggling from Lebanon, which affected government revenue and encouraged corruption among senior government officials.

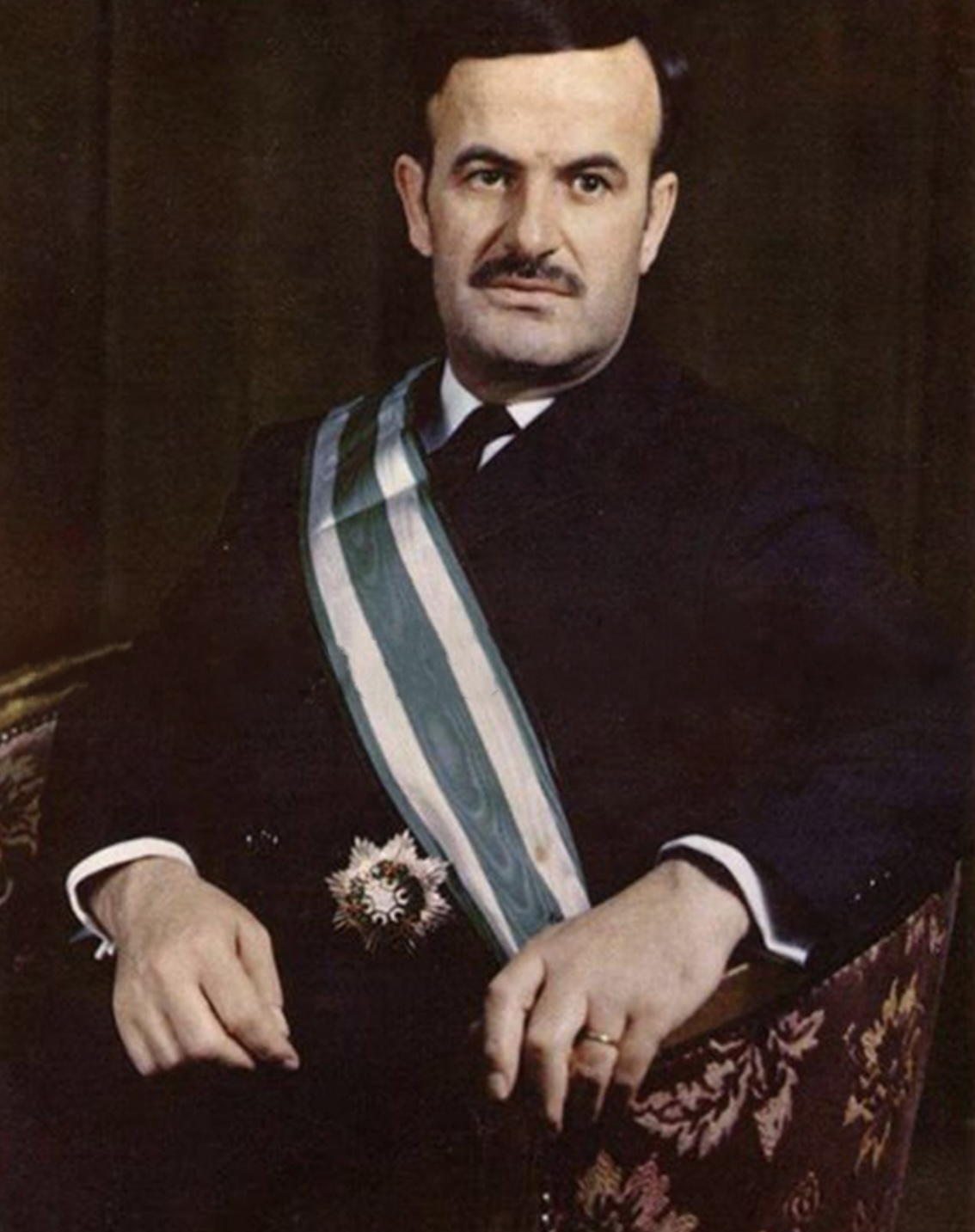
Assad in 1978

During the early 1980s, Syria's economy worsened. By mid 1984, the food crisis was severe, and the press was full of complaints. Assad's government sought a solution, arguing that food shortages could be avoided with careful economic planning. The food crisis continued through August, despite government measures. Syria lacked sugar, bread and the flour to bake it. Commodities including wood, iron, and construction equipment were scarce. The resulting inflation caused long queues and rampant black marketeering. Smuggling goods from Lebanon increased. Assad's government tried to combat the smuggling, stifled by the involvement of his brother Rifaat in the corruption. In July 1984, the government formed an anti-smuggling squad in attempt to control the Lebanon–Syria border. The Defense Detachment commanded by Rifaat al-Assad played a leading role in the smuggling, importing $400,000 worth of goods a day. The anti-smuggling squad seized $3.8million in goods during its first week.

The Syrian economy grew at five to seven percent per annum during the early 1990s. Exports increased, the balance of trade improved, inflation was moderate (15–18 percent), and oil exports increased. In May 1991 Assad's government liberalized the Syrian economy in so-called Al-Ta`addudiyya Al-Iqtisadiyya campaign, which stimulated domestic and foreign private investment. Most foreign investors were Arab Persian Gulf states since Western countries still had political and economic reasons not to invest. The Gulf states invested in infrastructure and development projects. The Ba'ath Party's socialist ideology denied the Assad government privatization of state-owned companies.

Syria fell into recession during the mid-1990s. Several years later, its economic growth was languishing at 1.5 percent. This was insufficient for the country as population growth was between 3 and 3.5 percent. Another symptom of the crisis was statism in foreign trade. Syria's economic crisis coincided with a recession in world markets. A 1998 drop in oil prices dealt a major blow to Syria's economy; when oil prices rose the following year, the Syrian economy partially recovered. In 1999, one of the worst droughts in a century caused a drop of 25–30 percent in crop yields compared with 1997 and 1998. Assad's government implemented emergency measures, including loans and compensation to farmers plus the distribution of free fodder to feed sheep and cattle. Those steps were limited, though, and had no measurable effect on the economy.

Assad's government tried to decrease population growth, but this was only marginally successful. One sign of economic stagnation was Syria's lack of progress in talks with the EU on a trade agreement. The main cause was the country's difficulty in meeting EU demands to open the economy and introduce reforms. Marc Pierini, head of the EU delegation in Damascus, said that if the Syrian economy was not modernised it would not benefit from closer ties to the EU. Assad's government gave civil servants a 20-percent pay raise on the anniversary of the corrective movement that brought him to power. Although the foreign press criticised Assad for his reluctance to liberalize the economy, the government would not modernize the banking system, permit private banks or open a stock exchange.

==== Sectarianism ====
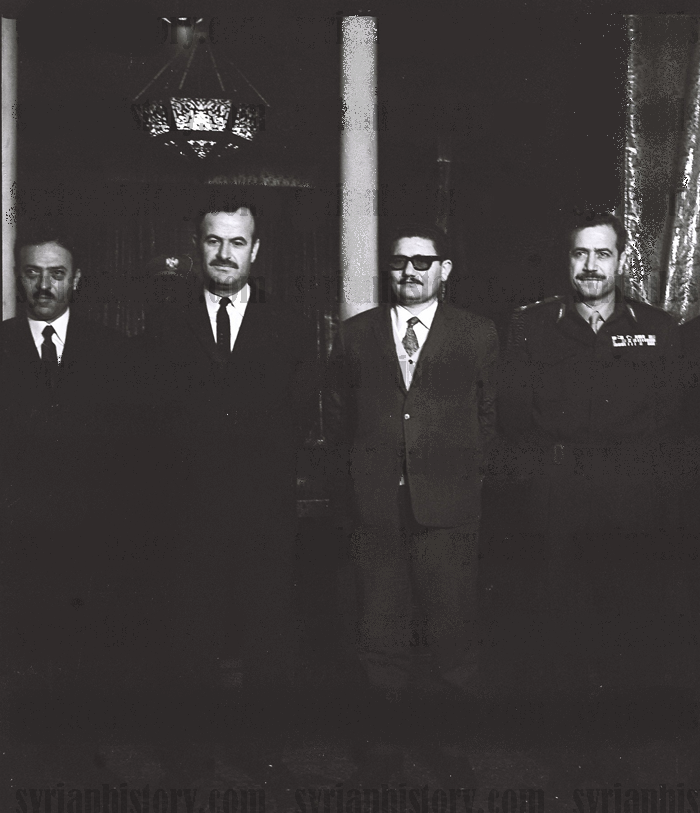
Hafez in 1971 with Sunni members of the political elite: (L–R) Ahmad al-Khatib, Assad, Abdullah al-Ahmar and Mustafa Tlass

When Assad came to power, he increased Alawite dominance of the security and intelligence sectors to a near-monopoly. The coercive framework was under his control, weakening the state and party. According to Hinnebusch, the Alawite officers around Assad "were pivotal because as personal kinsmen or clients of the president, they combined privileged access to him with positions in the party and control of the levers of coercion. They were, therefore, in an unrivalled position to act as political brokers and, especially in times of crisis, were uniquely placed to shape outcomes". The leading figures in the Alawite-dominated security system had family connections; Rifaat al-Assad controlled the Struggle Companies, and Assad's brother-in-law Adnan Makhlouf was his second-in-command as Commander of the Presidential Guard. Other prominent figures were Ali Haydar (special-forces head), Ibrahim al-Ali (Popular Army head), Muhammad al-Khuli (head of Assad's Air Force Intelligence Directorate from 1970 to 1987) and Military Intelligence head Ali Duba. Assad controlled the military through Alawites such as Generals Shafiq Fayadh (commander of the 3rd Division), Ibrahim Safi (commander of the 1st Division) and Adnan Badr Hassan (commander of the 9th Division). During the 1990s, Assad further strengthened Alawite dominance by replacing Sunni General Hikmat al-Shihabi with General Ali Aslan as chief of staff. The Alawites, with their high status, appointed and promoted based on kinship and favor rather than professional respect. Therefore, an Alawite elite emerged from these policies. Anti-Sunni orientation of his Alawite regime also pushed Assad to pursue closer relations with Shia Iran.

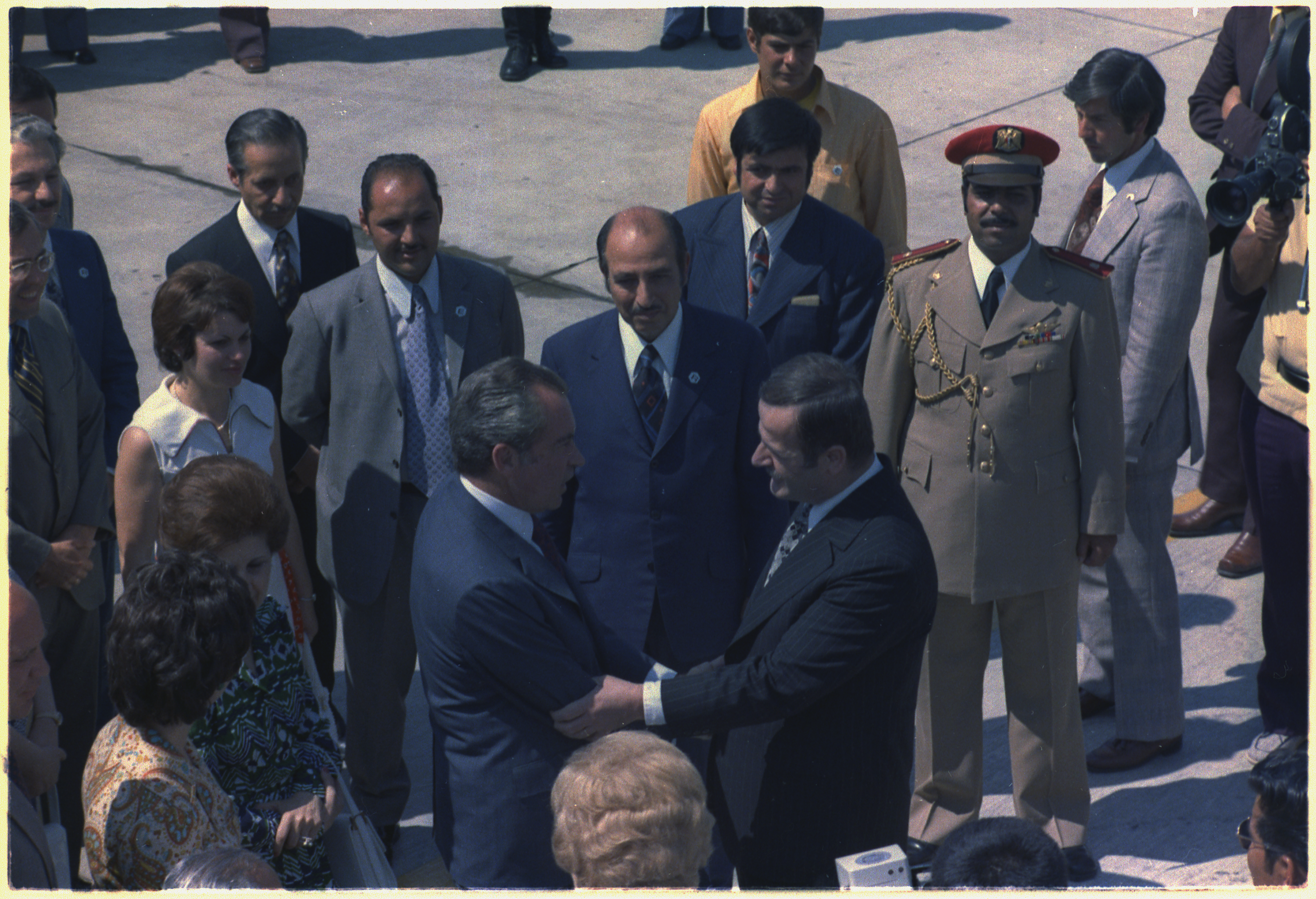
Assad greeting Richard Nixon on the latter's arrival at Damascus Airport, 15 July 1974

During the early years of his rule, some of Assad's elite had appeared non-sectarian; prominent Sunni figures at the beginning of his rule were Abdul Halim Khaddam, Shihabi, Naji Jamil, Abdullah al-Ahmar and Mustafa Tlass. However, none of these people had a power base distinct from that of Assad. Although Sunnis held the positions of Air Force Commander from 1971 to 1994 (Jamil, Subhi Haddad and Ali Malahafji), General Intelligence head from 1970 to 2000 (Adnan Dabbagh, Ali al-Madani, Nazih Zuhayr, Fuad al-Absi and Bashir an-Najjar), Chief of Staff of the Syrian Army from 1974 to 1998 (Shihabi) and defense minister from 1972 until after Assad's death (Tlass), none had power separate from Assad or the Alawite-dominated security system. When Jamil headed the Air Force, he could not issue orders without the knowledge of Khuli (the Alawite head of Air Force Intelligence).

After the failed Islamist uprising, Assad's reliance on his relatives intensified; before that, his Sunni colleagues had some autonomy. A defector from Assad's government said, "Tlass is in the army but at the same time seems as if he is not of the army; he neither binds nor loosens and has no role other than that of the tail in the beast." Another example was Shihabi, who occasionally represented Assad. However, he had no control in the Syrian military; Ali Aslan, First Deputy Chief of Staff for Operations during most of his tenure, was responsible for troop maneuvers. Although the Sunnis were in the forefront, the Alawites had the power.

==== Militarization ====
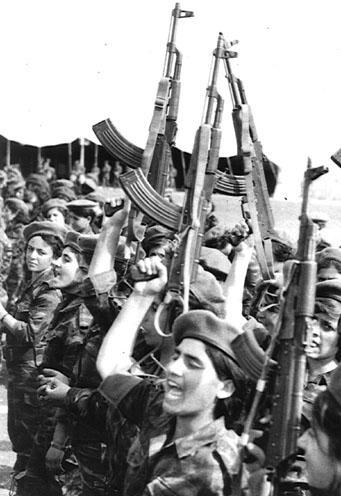
Syrian soldiers in 1980

From the very beginning of his rule, Assad pursued an active policy of militarizing the Syrian state and its society - his goal was to build a strong traditional army (with the support of the USSR) to fight Israel. Assad gave a very high priority to building a strong military and preparing it for a confrontation with Israel, for both offensive and defensive purposes and to enable him to politically negotiate the return of the Golan Heights from a position of military strength. He allocated up to 70 percent of the annual budget to the military build-up and received large quantities of modern arms from the Soviet Union: Assad eventually built a large and more professional military equipped with modern tanks, airplanes and long-range ground-to-ground missiles capable of launching chemical warheads into most Israeli cities. The Syrian Arab Army, which was mainly a conscripted force, increased from 50,000 personnel in 1967 to 225,000 in 1973 and to over 500,000 in 1986, and its air and armored fleets were among the largest in the world. Already high military spending has steadily increased, burdening the Syrian economy.

The policy of general militarization also affected the civil sphere of the country: militaristic propaganda was very widespread, especially in schools and educational institutions (where students were taught military tactics and the use of weapons), and Assad himself often wore a military uniform, and was often depicted in portraits in military uniform. It is believed that military education in Syrian schools was introduced in the 1970s by Hafez al-Assad, although the preconditions for this had been there since the Ba'ath Party came to power. Students were required to wear military uniforms (which were standard for Syrian schools at the time) and go to military camps known as moaskar for 15 days, where they were further introduced to soldier's life and were under the command of military officers. Thus, taking into account only the soldiers of the Syrian army, it was 4th in the world in terms of militarization per capita. Additionally, even more people in the country knew how to use a weapon, from instruction in school.

=== Arab Belt project ===
From 1973 to 1976, under Assad's orders, an Arabization campaign known as the "Arab Belt" was carried out in northeastern Syria. The Assad government called the campaign "Plan to establish model state farms in the Jazira region". The aim of the campaign was to change the ethnic composition of north-east Syria in favor of the Arabs and to the detriment of the local inhabitants, the Kurds. It involved the seizure of land which was then settled with Arabs displaced by the creation of Lake Assad. The programme was implemented in 1973; forcibly deporting around 140,000 Kurds from 332 villages and confiscating their lands around a 180-mile strip. Tens of thousands of Arab settlers coming from Raqqa were then granted these stolen lands to establish settlements in which to permanently live. The area of the project was a strip of land - almost 15km in breadth - that extended over 375km in length; across the north-eastern boundary-regions of Syria with Turkey and Iraq.

The Arabs were provided with weapons and divided between more than 50 so-called model farms in the Jazira Region and to the north of Raqqa. Twelve were built each around Qamishli and Al-Malakiyah and sixteen around Ras al Ayn. The Kurdish village names of the area were replaced by Arabic names not necessarily related to the traditions and history of the region. These Arabs are named as Maghmurin (مغمورين Maġmūrīn, which is affected by flooding). The campaign was eventually faded out in 1976, but the deported Kurds have not been allowed to return.

=== Islamist uprising ===
==== Background ====
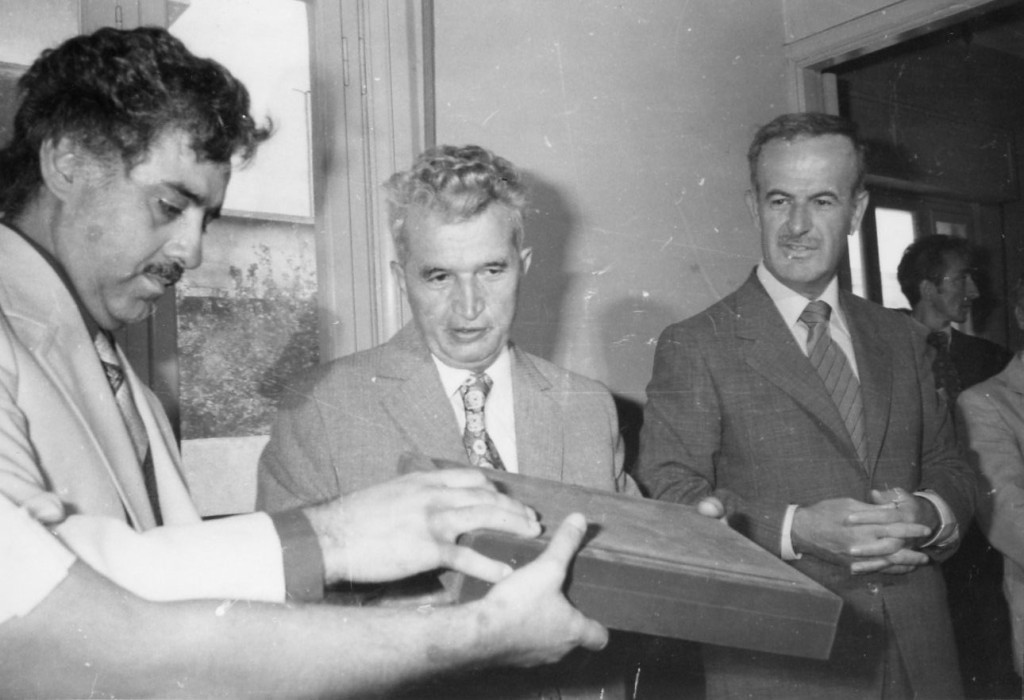
Hafez al-Assad alongside Romanian President Nicolae Ceaușescu in 1979

Assad's pragmatic policies indirectly led to the establishment of a "new class", and he accepted this while it furthered his aims against Israel. When Assad began pursuing a policy of economic liberalization, the state bureaucracy began using their positions for personal gain. The state gave implementation rights to "much of its development program to foreign firms and contractors, fueling a growing linkage between the state and private capital". What ensued was a spike in corruption, which led the political class to be "thoroughly embourgeoised". The channeling of external money through the state to private enterprises "created growing opportunities for state elites' self-enrichment through corrupt manipulation of state-market interchanges. Besides outright embezzlement, webs of shared interests in commissions and kickbacks grew up between high officials, politicians, and business interests". The Alawite military-security establishment got the greatest share of the money; the Ba'ath Party and its leaders ruled a new class, defending their interests instead of those of peasants and workers (whom they were supposed to represent). This, coupled with growing Sunni disillusionment with what Hinnebusch calls "the regime's mixture of statism, rural and sectarian favouritism, corruption and new inequalities", fueled the growth of the Islamic movement. Because of this, the Muslim Brotherhood of Syria became the vanguard of anti-Ba'athist forces.

The Brotherhood had historically been a vehicle for Islamism during its introduction to the Syrian political scene during the 1960s under the leadership of Mustafa al-Siba'i. After Siba'i's imprisonment, under Isam al-Attar's leadership, the Brotherhood developed into the ideological antithesis of Ba'athist rule. However, the Ba'ath Party's organizational superiority worked in its favor; with Attar's enforced exile, the Muslim Brotherhood was in disarray. It was not until the 1970s that the Muslim Brotherhood established a clear, central collective authority for its organization under Adnan Saad ad-Din, Sa'id Hawwa, Ali Sadr al-Din al-Bayanuni and Husni Abu. Because of their organizational capabilities, the Muslim Brotherhood grew tenfold from 1975 to 1978 (from 500 to 700 in Aleppo); nationwide, by 1978 it had 30,000 followers.

==== Events ====
The Islamist uprising began in the mid-to-late 1970s, with attacks on prominent members of the Ba'ath Alawite elite. As the conflict worsened, a debate in the party between hard-liners (represented by Rifaat al-Assad) and Ba'ath liberals (represented by Mahmoud al-Ayyubi) began. The Seventh Regional Congress, in 1980, was held in an atmosphere of crisis. The party leadership—with the exception of Assad and his proteges—were criticised severely by party delegates, who called for an anti-corruption campaign, a new, clean government, curtailing the powers of the military-security apparatus and political liberalization. With Assad's consent, a new government (headed by the presumably clean Abdul Rauf al-Kasm) was established with new, young technocrats. The new government failed to assuage critics, and the Sunni middle class and the radical left (believing that Ba'athist rule could be overthrown with an uprising) began collaborating with the Islamists.

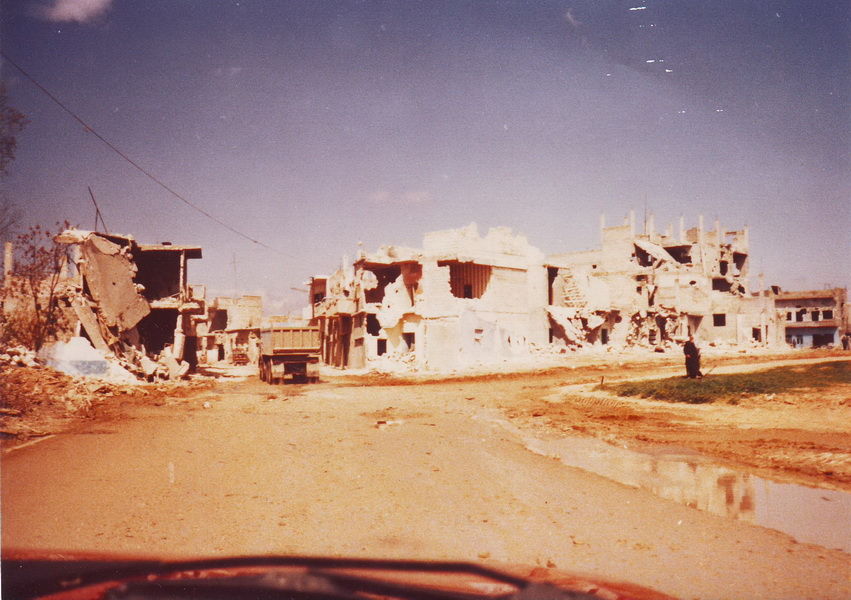
Hama devastation after bombardment by the Syrian army

Believing they had the upper hand in the conflict, beginning in 1980 the Islamists began a series of campaigns against government installations in Aleppo; the attacks became urban guerrilla warfare. The government began to lose control in the city. Inspired Islamists took similar disturbances to Hama, Homs, Idlib, Latakia, Deir ez-Zor, Maaret-en-Namen and Jisr esh-Shagour. Those affected by Ba'athist repression began to rally behind the insurgents; Ba'ath Party co-founder Bitar supported the uprising, rallying the old, anti-military Ba'athists. The increasing threat to the government's survival strengthened the hard-liners, who favored repression over concessions. Security forces began to purge all state, party and social institutions in Syria, and were sent to the northern provinces to quell the uprising. When this failed, the hard-liners began accusing the United States of fomenting the uprising and called for the reinstatement of "revolutionary vigilance". The hard-liners won the debate after a failed attempt on Assad's life in June 1980, and began responding to the uprising with state terrorism later that year. Under Rifaat al-Assad, Islamic prisoners at the Tadmur prison were massacred, membership in the Muslim Brotherhood became a capital offence and the government sent a death squad to kill Bitar and Attar's former wife. The military court began condemning captured prisoners, which "sometimes degenerated into indiscriminate killings". Little care was taken to distinguish Muslim Brotherhood hard-liners from their passive supporters, and violence was met with violence.

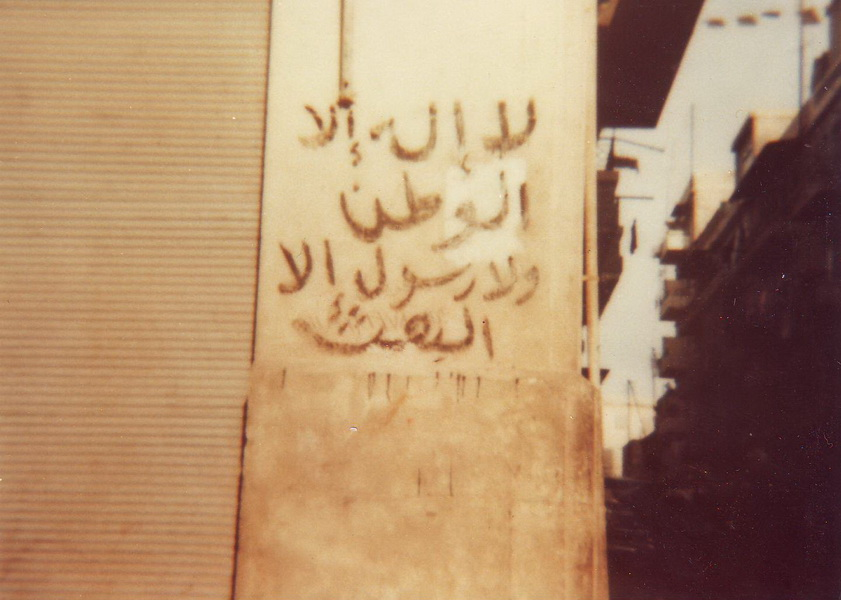
Destruction in Hama in 1982. The inscription left by Syrian forces reads: "There is no god but the Motherland, there is no messenger but Ba'ath".

Ultimately this culminated in the 1982 Hama massacre when the government crushed the uprising. Helicopter gunships, bulldozers, and artillery bombardment razed the city, killing thousands of people. The Ba'ath government withstood the uprising, not because of popular support, but because the opposition was disorganised and had little urban support. Throughout the uprising, the Sunni middle class continued to support the Ba'ath Party because of its dislike of political Islam. After the uprising the government resumed its version of militaristic Leninism, reverting the liberalization introduced when Assad came to power. The Ba'ath Party was weakened by the uprising; democratic elections for delegates to the Regional and National Congresses were halted, and open discussion within the party ended. The uprising made Syria more totalitarian than ever, and strengthened Assad's position as undisputed leader of Syria.

=== 1983–1984 succession crisis ===
In November 1983, Assad, a diabetic, had a heart attack complicated by phlebitis; this triggered a succession crisis. On 13 November, after visiting his brother in the hospital, Rifaat al-Assad reportedly announced his candidacy for president; he did not believe Assad would be able to continue ruling the country. When he did not receive support from Assad's inner circle, he made, in the words of historian Hanna Batatu, "abominably lavish" promises to win them over.

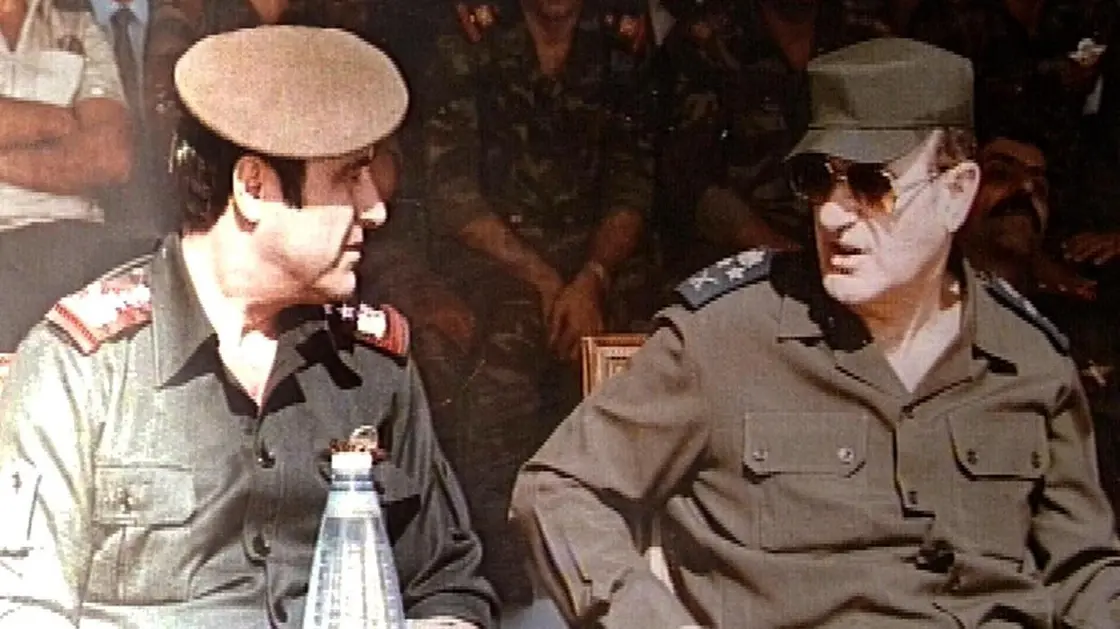
Hafez al-Assad (r) with his brother Rifaat al-Assad during a military ceremony in Damascus, 1984. Rifaat launched a failed coup attempt the same year, resulting in his expulsion from Syria.

Until his 1985 ouster, Rifaat al-Assad was considered the face of corruption by the Syrian people. Although highly paid as Commander of Defense Companies, he accumulated unexplained wealth. According to Batatu, "there is no way that he could have permissibly accumulated the vast sums needed for the investments he made in real estate in Syria, Europe and the United States".

Although it is unclear if any top officials supported Rifaat al-Assad, most did not. He lacked his brother's stature and charisma, and was vulnerable to charges of corruption. His 50,000-strong Defense Companies were viewed with suspicion by the upper leadership and throughout society; they were considered corrupt, poorly disciplined and indifferent to human suffering. Rifaat al-Assad also lacked military support; officers and soldiers resented the Defense Companies' monopoly of Damascus' security, their separate intelligence services and prisons and their higher pay. He did not abandon the hope of succeeding his brother, opting to take control of the country through his post as Commander of Defense Companies. In what became known as the "Poster War", personnel from the Defense Companies replaced posters of Assad in Damascus with those of Rifaat al-Assad. The security service, still loyal to Hafez, responded by replacing Rifaat al-Assad's posters with Hafez's. The poster war lasted for a week until Assad's health improved.

Shortly after the poster war, all of Rifaat al-Assad's proteges were removed from positions of power. This decree nearly sparked a clash between the Defense Companies and the Republican Guard on 27 February 1984, but conflict was avoided by Rifaat al-Assad's appointment as one of three Vice Presidents on 11 March. He acquired this post by surrendering his position as Commander of Defense Companies to a Hafez supporter. Rifaat al-Assad was succeeded as Defense Companies head by his son-in-law. During the night of 30 March, Rifaat ordered Defense Company loyalists to seal Damascus off and advance to the city. The Republican Guard was put on alert in Damascus, and 3rd Armored Division commander Shafiq Fayadh ordered troops outside Damascus to encircle the Defense Companies blocking the roads into the city. Rifaat al-Assad's plan might have succeeded if Special Forces commander Ali Haydar supported him, but Haydar sided with the president. Assad punished Rifaat al-Assad with exile, allowing him to return in later years without a political role. The Defense Companies were reduced by 30,000–35,000 men, and their role was assumed by the Republican Guard. Makhluf, the Republican Guard commander was promoted to major general, and Hafez's son Bassel al-Assad, then an army major, became influential in the guard. Assad recovered and returned to his work routine, holding numerous meetings with diplomats. However, his deteriorating health was noticeable to everyone—he had lost weight and turned pale.

=== Foreign policy ===
==== Yom Kippur War ====
===== Planning =====
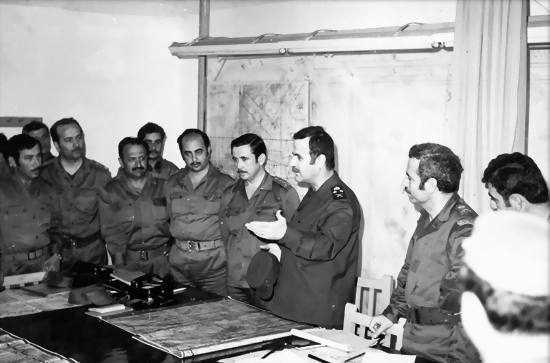
Assad and his generals planning the war

Since the Arab defeat in the Six-Day War, Assad was convinced that the Israelis had won the war by subterfuge. After gaining power, his top foreign-policy priority was to regain the Arab territory lost in the war. Assad reaffirmed Syria's rejection of the 1967 UN Security Council Resolution 242 because he believed it stood for the "liquidation of the Palestine question". To Assad, peace for the region, including the Palestinians, wasn't enough. He believed, and continued to believe until long into his rule, that the only way to get Israel to negotiate with the Arabs was through war.

When Assad took power, Syria was isolated. Planning an attack on Israel, he sought allies and war material. Ten weeks after gaining power, Assad visited the Soviet Union. The Soviet leadership was wary of supplying the Syrian government, viewing Assad's rise to power with reserve and believing him to lean further toward the US and Western Europe than Jadid did. While he soon understood that the Soviet relationship with the Arabs would never be as deep as the United States' relationship with Israel, he needed its weapons. Unlike his predecessors (who tried to win Soviet support with socialist policies), Assad was willing to give the Soviets a stable presence in the Middle East through Syria, access to Syrian naval bases (giving them a role in the peace process) and help in curtailing American influence in the region. The Soviets responded by sending arms to Syria. The new relationship bore fruit, and between February 1971 and October 1973 Assad met several times with Soviet leader Leonid Brezhnev.

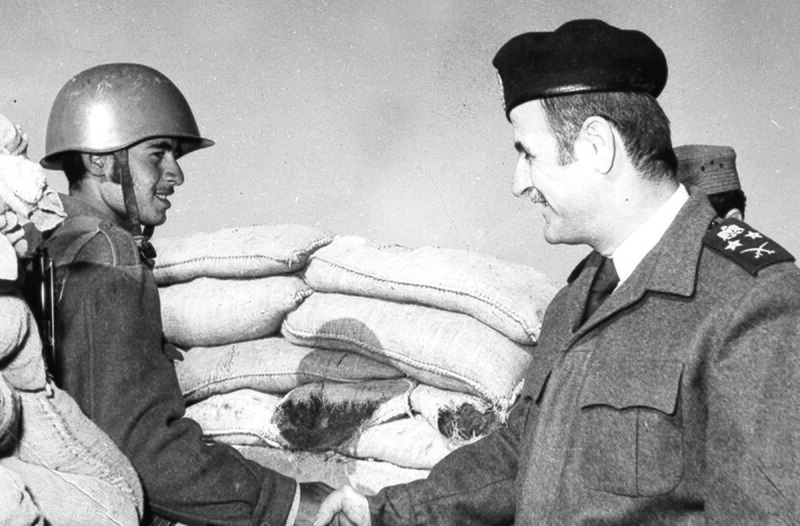
Assad visits positions of the Syrian army

Assad believed that Syria would have no chance in a war against Israel without Egyptian participation. He believed that if the United Arab Republic had not collapsed, the Arabs would already have liberated Palestine. For a war against Israel, Syria needed to establish another front. However, by this time Syria's relations with Egypt and Jordan were shaky at best. Planning for war began in 1971 with an agreement between Assad and Anwar Sadat. In the beginning, the renewed Egyptian–Syrian alliance was based upon the proposed Federation of Arab Republics (FAR), a federation initially encompassing Egypt, Libya, Sudan (which left soon after FAR's first summit) and Syria. Assad and Sadat used the FAR summits to plan war strategy, and by 1971 they had appointed Egyptian General Muhammad Sadiq supreme commander of both armies. From 1972 to 1973, the countries filled their arsenals and trained their armies. In a secret meeting of the Egyptian–Syrian Military Council from 21 to 23 August 1973, the two chiefs of staff (Syrian Youssef Chakkour and Egyptian Saad el-Shazly) signed a document declaring their intention to go to war against Israel. During a meeting of Assad, Sadat and their respective defense ministers (Tlass and Ahmed Ismail ) on 26–27 August, the two leaders decided to go to war together.

Egypt’s reason to attack Israel was different from Syria's. While Assad wanted to regain lost Arab territory, Sadat wished to strengthen Egypt's position in its peace policy toward Israel. The Syrians were deceived by Sadat and the Egyptians, which would play a major role in the Arab defeat. Egyptian Chief of Staff Shazly was convinced from the beginning that Egypt could not mount a successful full-scale offensive against Israel; therefore, he campaigned for a limited war. Sadat knew that Assad would not participate in the war if he knew his real intentions. Since the collapse of the UAR, the Egyptians were critical of the Ba'athist government; they saw it as an untrustworthy ally.

===== The war =====
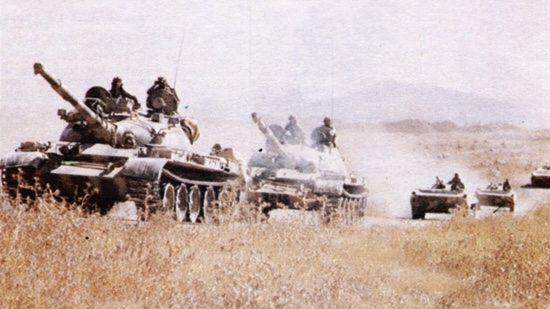
Column of the Syrian tank and Armoured vehicles entering Golan Heights, 1973

At 14:05 on 6 October 1973, Egyptian forces (attacking through the Sinai Peninsula) and Syrian forces (attacking the Golan Heights) crossed the border into Israel and penetrated the forward Israeli defense lines. The Syrian forces on the Golan Heights met with more intense fighting than their Egyptian counterparts, but by 8 October had broken through the Israeli defenses. The early successes of the Syrian army were due to its officer corps (where officers were promoted because of merit and not politics) and its ability to handle advanced Soviet weaponry: tanks, artillery batteries, aircraft, man-portable missiles, the Sagger anti-tank weapon and the 2K12 Kub anti-aircraft system on mobile launchers. With the help of these weapons, Egypt and Syria could, for the first time, compete against Israel's armor and air supremacy. Egypt and Syria announced the war to the world first, accusing Israel of starting it, mindful of the importance of avoiding appearing as the aggressor (Israel accused the Arab powers of starting the Six-Day War when they launched Operation Focus). In any case, early Syrian successes helped rectify the loss of face they had suffered following the Six-Day War.

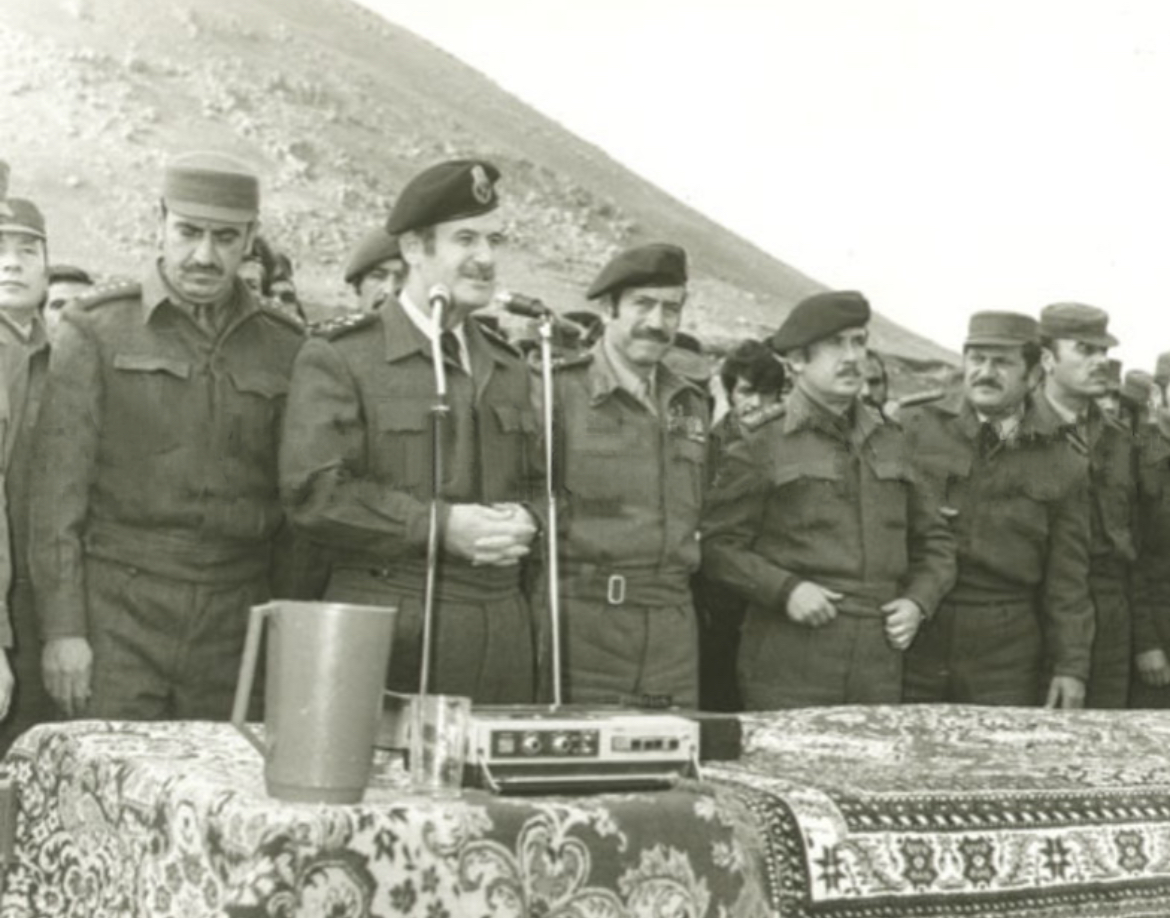
Assad speech to his soldiers, October 1973

The main reason for the reversal of fortune was Egypt's operational pause from 7 to 14 October. After capturing parts of the Sinai, the Egyptian campaign halted and the Syrians were left fighting the Israelis alone. The Egyptian leaders, believing their war aims accomplished, dug in. While their early successes in the war had surprised them, War Minister General Ahmad Ismail Ali advised caution. In Syria, Assad and his generals waited for the Egyptians to move. When the Israeli government learned of Egypt's modest war strategy, it ordered an "immediate continuous action" against the Syrian military. According to Patrick Seale, "For three days, 7, 8, and 9 October, Syrian troops on the Golan faced the full fury of the Israeli air force as, from first light to nightfall, wave after wave of aircraft swooped down to bomb, strafe and napalm their tank concentration and their fuel and ammunition carriers right back to the Purple Line." By 9 October, the Syrians were retreating behind the Purple Line (the Israeli–Syrian border since the Six-Day War). By 13 October, the war was lost, but in contrast to the Six-Day War, the Syrians were not crushed; this earned Assad respect in Syria and abroad. On 14 October, Egypt began a limited offensive against Israel for political reasons. Sadat needed Assad on his side for his peace policy with Israel to succeed, and military action as a means to an end. The renewed Egyptian military offensive was ill-conceived. A week later, due to Egyptian inactivity, the Israelis had organised and the Arabs had lost their most important advantage. While the military offensive gave Assad hope, this was an illusion; the Arabs had already lost the war militarily. Egypt's behavior during the war caused friction between Assad and Sadat. Assad, still inexperienced in foreign policy, believed that the Egyptian–Syrian alliance was based on trust and failed to understand Egypt's duplicity. Although it was not until after the war that Assad would learn that Sadat was in contact with American National Security Advisor Henry Kissinger almost daily during the war, the seeds of distrust had been sown. Around this time, Sadat called for an American-led ceasefire agreement between Egypt, Syria, and Israel; however, he was unaware that under Kissinger's tenure the United States had become a staunch supporter of Israel.

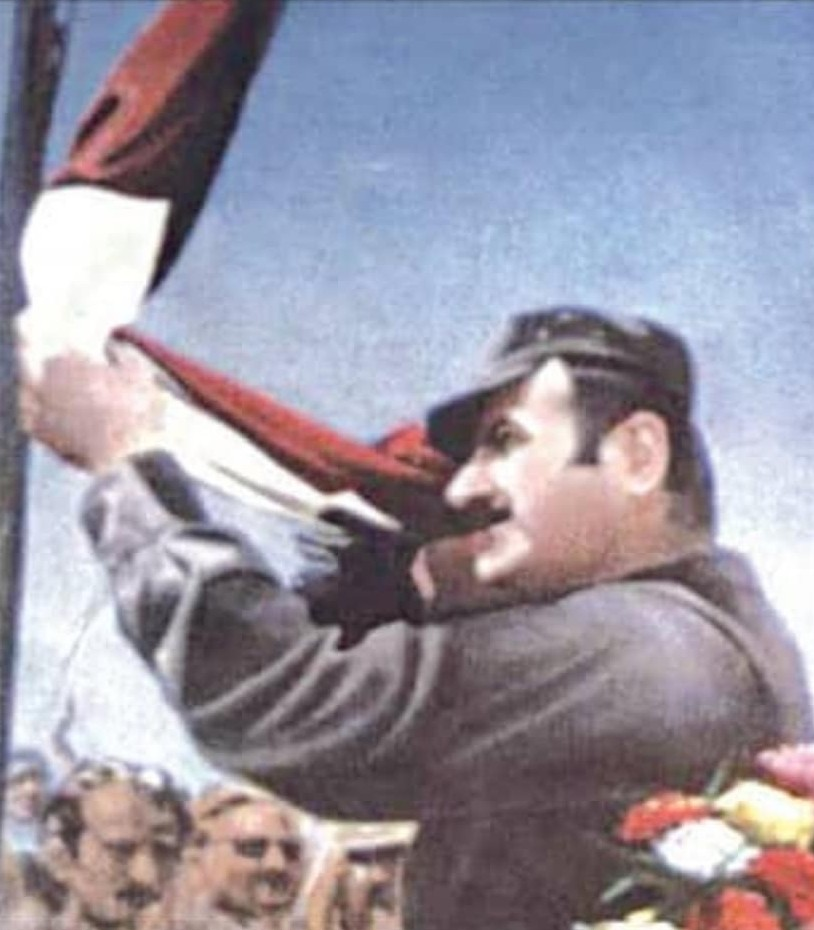
Portrait of the moment of Assad raising the Syrian flag over Quneitra, which he gained after the war

On 16 October, Sadat—without telling Assad—called for a ceasefire in a speech to the People's Assembly, the Egyptian legislative body. Assad was not only surprised but could not comprehend why Sadat trusted "American goodwill for a satisfactory result". Soviet Premier Alexei Kosygin visited Cairo, urging Sadat to accept a ceasefire without the condition of Israeli withdrawal from the occupied territories. While Sadat was reluctant at first, Kosygin returned on 18 October with satellite images showing 300 Israeli tanks in Egyptian territory. The blow to Sadat's morale was such that he sent a cable to Assad, obliquely saying that all hope was lost. Assad, who was in a better position, was still optimistic. Under Soviet influence, Egypt called for a ceasefire on 22 October 1973, direct negotiations between the warring parties and the implementation of the UN Security Council Resolution 242. The ceasefire resolution did not call for Israeli withdrawal from its occupied territories. Assad was annoyed since he had not been informed beforehand of Sadat's change in policy (which affected them both). On 23 October the Syrian government accepted the ceasefire, spelling out its understanding of UN Resolution 338 (withdrawal of Israeli troops from the occupied territories and the safeguarding of Palestinian rights).

==== Lebanese Civil War ====
We did not go into Lebanon to achieve any regional ambitions, nor for any selfish or opportunistic motives. On the contrary, it was at the expense of our economy and our daily bread.

— Assad, reviewing Syria's intervention in Lebanon

Syria intervened in Lebanon in 1976 during the civil war, which began in 1975. Assad ordered the Palestine Liberation Army (PLA), a regular force based in Syria with Syrian officers, into Lebanon to fight the PLO and left wing militias. Around this time, the Israeli government opened its borders to Maronite refugees in Lebanon. Clashes between the Syria-loyal PLA and militants occurred throughout the country. Despite Syrian support and Khaddam's mediation, Rashid Karami (the Sunni Muslim Prime Minister of Lebanon) did not have enough support to appoint a cabinet.

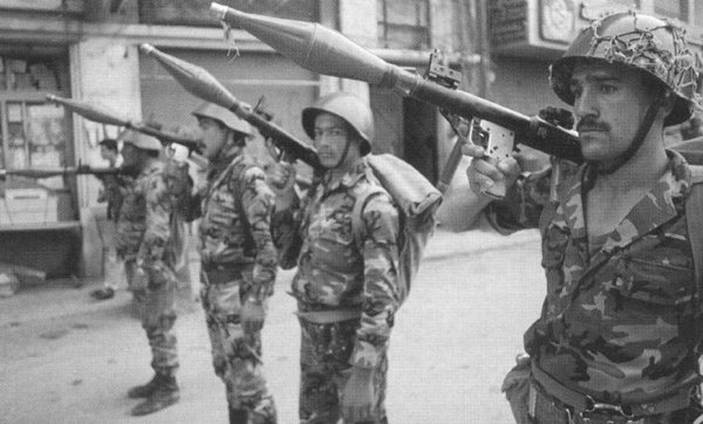
Syrian army soldiers in Lebanon

In early 1976 Assad was approached by Lebanese politicians for help in forcing the resignation of Suleiman Frangieh, the Christian President of Lebanon. Assad resisted attempts by some Lebanese politicians to enlist him in Frangieh's ouster; when General Abdul Aziz al-Ahdāb attempted to seize power, Syrian troops stopped him. In the meantime, radical Lebanese leftists were gaining the upper hand in the military conflict. Kamal Jumblatt, leader of the Lebanese National Movement (LNM), believed that his strong military position would compel Frangieh's resignation. Assad did not wish a leftist victory in Lebanon which would strengthen the position of the Palestinians. He did not want a rightist victory either, instead of seeking a middle-ground solution which would safeguard Lebanon and the region. When Jumblatt met with Assad on 27 March 1976, he tried to persuade him to let him "win" the war; Assad replied that a ceasefire should be in effect to ensure the 1976 presidential elections. Meanwhile, on Assad's orders Syria sent troops into Lebanon without international approval.

While Yasser Arafat and the PLO had not officially taken a side in the conflict, several PLO members were fighting with the LNM. Assad attempted to steer Arafat and the PLO away from Lebanon, threatening him with a cutoff of Syrian aid. The two sides were unable to reach an agreement. When Frangieh stepped down in 1976, Syria pressured Lebanese members of parliament to elect Elias Sarkis president. One-third of the Lebanese members of parliament (primarily supporters of Raymond Edde) boycotted the election to protest American and Syrian interference. On 31 May 1976, Syria began a full-scale intervention in Lebanon to (according to the official Syrian account) end bombardment of the Maronite cities of Qubayat and Aandqat. Before the intervention, Assad and the Syrian government were one of several interests in Lebanon; afterward, they were the controlling factors in Lebanese politics. On Assad's orders, the Syrian troop presence slowly increased to 30,000. Syria received approval for the intervention from the United States and Israel to help them defeat Palestinian forces in Lebanon. The Ba'athist group As-Sa'iqa and the PLA's Hittīn brigade fought Palestinians who sided with the LNM.

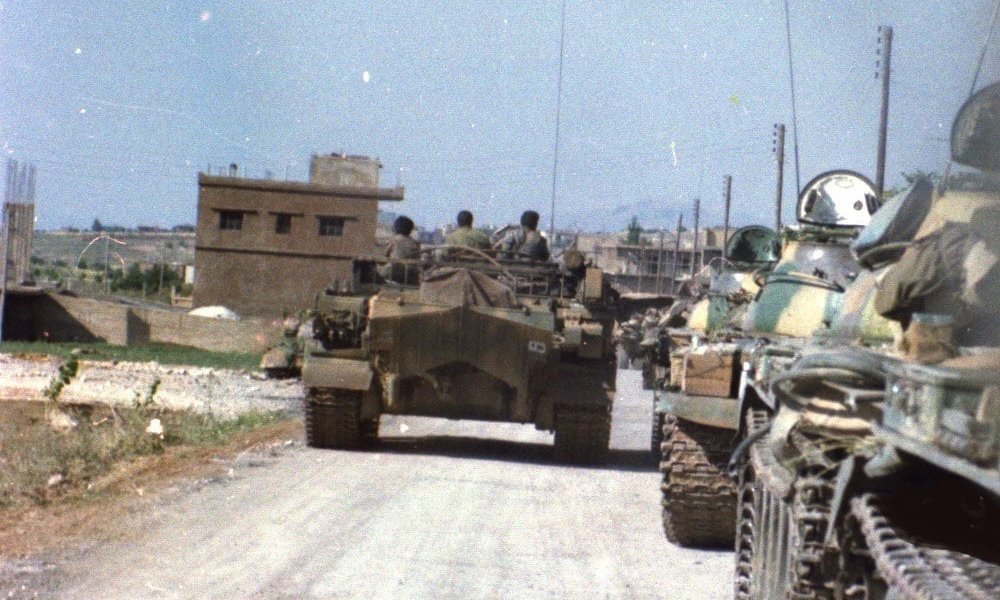
A column of Syrian armored vehicles in Sultan Yacoub, 1982

Within a week of the Syrian intervention, Christian leaders issued a statement of support. Muslim leaders established a joint command of all Palestinian groups except As-Sa'iqa, which was driven by the PLO to its stronghold near the main airport. Shortly afterward, As-Sa'iqa and other leftist Damascus forces were absorbed by the Syrian military. On 8 June 1976 Syrian forces were pushed back from Sidon, encountering stiff resistance in Beirut from the LNM. Assad's actions angered much of the Arab world however and the sight of Syria trying to eliminate the PLO brought criticism upon him. There was considerable hostility to Assad's alliance with the Maronites in Syria. As a result, the Syrian government asked the Arab League to assist in the conflict. The Arab League began to meditate, establishing the Arab Deterrent Force (ADF) for peacekeeping. The Syrian strategy at this point was to gradually weaken the LNM and its Palestinian collaborators, continuing to support the Christian militia. However, the Syrians were unable to capture the LNM's stronghold of Aley before the Arab League called for a ceasefire on 17 October. The Arab League strengthened the ADF to 30,000 troops, most Syrian. While some heavy fighting continued, by December 1976 and January 1977 most Palestinian and Lebanese groups had disposed of their heavy weaponry. According to Charles Winslow, the "main phase" of the Lebanese Civil War had ended by 1977; until the early 1990s most violence was attributed to the turf, proxy, inter-communal and state wars. Assad used terrorism and intimidation to extend his control over Lebanon. Jumblatt died in a 1977 assassination allegedly ordered by Syria; in 1982, Syrian agents assassinated Lebanese President Bachir Gemayel (who was helped to power by the Israelis during the 1982 Lebanon War). Jumblatt and Gemayel had resisted Assad's attempts to dominate Lebanon. Assad caused the failure of the 1983 Lebanon–Israel agreement, and by proxy guerrilla warfare forced the Israeli Defense Forces to withdraw to southern Lebanon in 1985. Terrorism against Palestinians and Jordanian targets during the mid-1980s thwarted the rapprochement between King Hussein of Jordan and the PLO, slowing Jordanian–Israeli cooperation in the West Bank.

==== Hindawi affair ====
In April 1986, an attempt was made to blow up El Al Flight 016 heading to Israel by Jordanian citizen Nezar Nawwaf al-Mansur al-Hindawi (through his girlfriend Anne-Marie Murphy), but it was unsuccessful. After Hindawi gave the woman a bag of explosives on the flight (which was discovered by security guards), he went to the Syrian embassy and asked for assistance. The ambassador passed him to the embassy security men, who took him to their lodgings, where they tried to change his appearance by cutting and dyeing his hair. For an unknown reason, early the next morning, 18 April, Hindawi fled from the Syrians and gave himself up to the British police.

He was interrogated intensively for a number of days: during the interrogation, Hindawi claimed to have arranged the plot with high-ranking officers in Syrian Air Force intelligence a year earlier in Damascus, where he was given Syrian papers and instructions for operating the explosive. He supposedly conducted a training run back in England before returning again to Syria for final details and preparation. Hindawi said that the explosive was delivered to him in the Royal Garden Hotel in London on 5 April, less than two weeks prior to the attempted bombing. This story is supported by the fact that Hindawi had first sought refuge in the Syrian embassy after learning of the failed bombing, and that Syrian officials were in the process of altering his appearance before he fled again. Also, British intelligence had previously intercepted Syrian communications with Hindawi's name, Hindawi was using genuine Syrian documents although he was not Syrian, and Hindawi's original escape plan involved leaving England with Syrian agents working on Syrian Arab Airlines.

Later, Hindawi began to claim that everything was planned by Mossad, but most countries accepted the first version of events about Syria's involvement. After the court found Hindawi guilty, the then-British Prime Minister Margaret Thatcher broke off diplomatic relations with Syria. Following this, the United States and Canada recalled their ambassadors from Syria. The European Community also imposed minor sanctions.

==== Gulf War ====
When Saddam Hussein invaded Kuwait in August 1990, Assad sided with Kuwait and considered Iraq's aggression as a serious threat to Syria's interests. Assad and Saddam had long detested each other, and Assad felt that Syria would be the next target of Saddam if he won in Kuwait. As a result, Syria joined the US-led coalition and sent up to 20,000 troops to defend Saudi Arabia.

==== Political assassinations ====
When Hafez al-Assad came to power, he did not limit his authority to purging Syrian institutions. The regime organized assassinations and political murders of his potential (and proven) enemies who did not support either Assad or his policies. Moreover, the assassination attempts organized by the Assad regime neither affected only Syrians nor only those who lived in Syria.

On his deathbed in May 2000, Assad said that Mahmoud Al-Zoubi had betrayed him. He did not say what the betrayal was but demanded that "an investigation be conducted and that he be held accountable." The next day, at an emergency meeting of the Ba'ath Party, Zoubi was expelled from the party. On May 25, the Damascus police chief came to him and allegedly shot him in his own apartment - the official version was that Zoubi committed suicide.

===== Lebanon =====
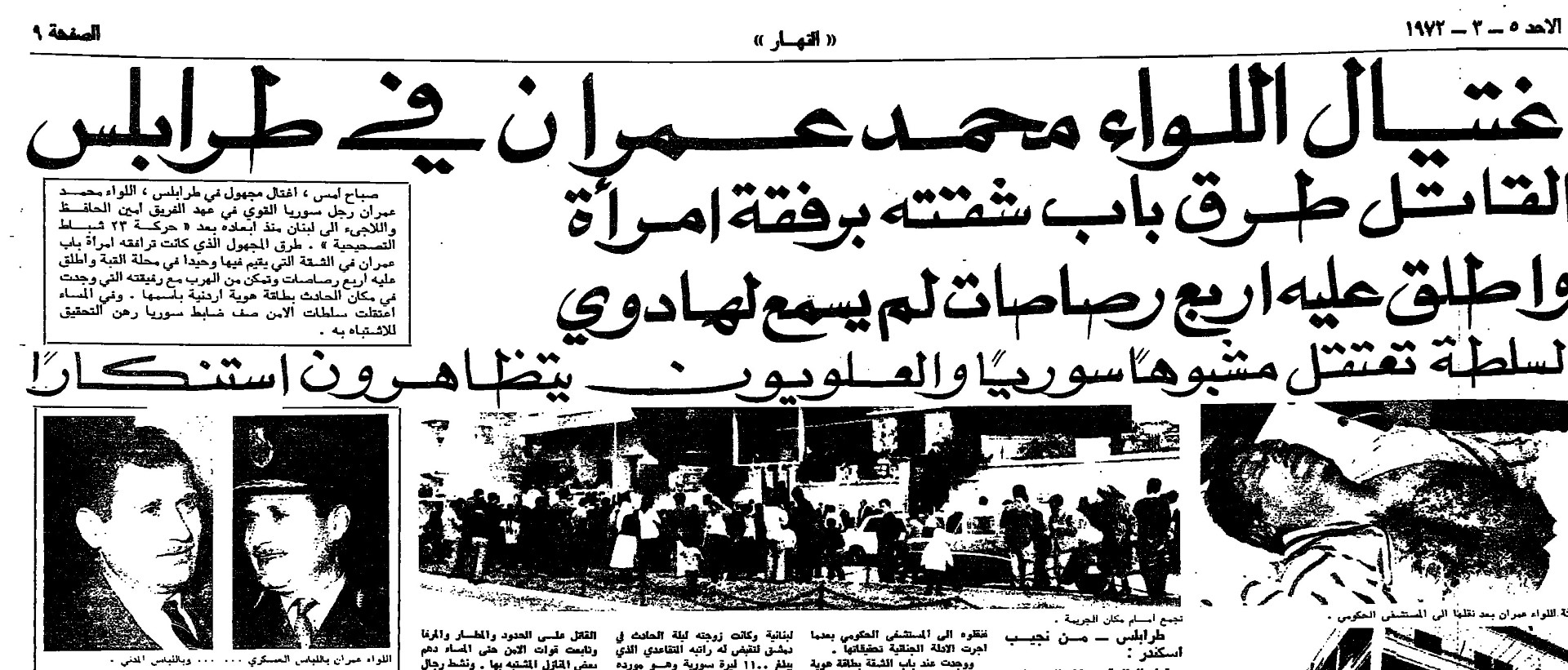
Newspaper announced death of Muhammad Umran in 1972

Muhammad Umran was a Assad's longtime opponent, with whom he had had disagreements since 1964, and had considerable influence on the minds of the Syrian military, so Assad believed that killing him would help strengthen his own family's power. On March 4, 1972, in the Lebanese city of Tripoli, men shot and killed Umran.

Salim Lawzi was a Lebanese journalist and founder of al Hawadeth magazine. His criticism of the Syrian role in Lebanese Civil War escalated leading to serious threats on his life. The Hawadeth main building was destroyed during the war. Fearing for his life due to the threats he was receiving, Lawzi chose self-exile in London, from where he continued editing his magazine. But After his mother died, he decided to return for her funeral. After landing in Beirut International Airport, he was kidnapped by gunmen on the Airport Road on 25 February 1980. His heavily bruised body from torture was found nine days later on 4 March 1980 in Aramoun, on the outskirts of Beirut. Forensic reports found heavy signs of torture, including a broken and dislocated right arm, maimed and disjointed writing hand, fingers burnt and blackened through use of acid and phosphoric substances, pens pierced into abdomen and intestines (obvious messages in mutilation for other critics of Syria) and an assassination-style bullet in the head. The alleged perpetrators were Syrian intelligence agents.

Khalil Akkawi was the leader of the Islamic Unification Movement lived in Lebanese Tripoli. Syrian Military Intelligence killed Khalil Akkawi in February 9, 1986, because he refused to fight the Lebanese Forces. Three supporters of Akkawi's Islamic Tawheed, or Islamic Unification Movement, were slain in gunfights with Syrian troopers after his burial. In the 1980s, Syrian intelligence services were very active in assassination attempts (mostly successful) against their opponents in Lebanon.

===== Europe =====
Even earlier, Salah ad-Din al-Bitar had been sentenced to death in absentia by the new government, and had fled to Beirut. In 1978, Assad pardoned him and allowed him to return to Syria. However, a quarrel and conflict soon broke out between them again, and Bitar fled to Paris. Bitar launched a press campaign against the Syrian government from his exile in Paris, attacking it in a new magazine which he entitled al-Ihyaa al-Arabi, in an echo of the name he and Aflaq had adopted almost forty years before. He was also rumored to be in contact with Syrian opposition figures in Baghdad. Bitar was killed by Syrian secret services in Paris on July 21, 1980. As he was exiting the elevator to enter his office, his assassin fired two shots to the back of his head.

Banan Al-Tantawi was the wife of former Muslim Brotherhood director general Issam al-Attar and lived in Aachen, Germany. In March 1981, her father, Ali Al-Tantawi, called her, saying that she was in serious danger (in the form of assassins sent by Assad after her and her husband). An hour later, a neighbor knocked on her door at gunpoint - Tantawi, hearing a familiar voice, opened the door and was immediately killed by two men.

== Political ideology and beliefs ==
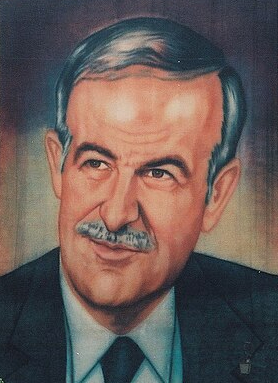
Assad portrait, 1994

Assad was originally a devout pan-Arabist and was greatly inspired by Gamal Abdel Nasser and his ideas. However, over time, his ideology shifted towards a mix of Arab nationalism and Syrian nationalism.

As a result, his ideas and methods of ruling the state became known as Assadism. Assadism is considered a later and more personalized version of radical neo-Ba'athism, which places Hafez al-Assad at the center as the founder and father of the modern Syrian nation. Assadism's policies were a strange mixture of Syrian-Arab nationalism, radical socialism (until the 1990s), secularism, militarism and a personality cult around Hafez and his family: Assadism exalted the person of Hafez and portrayed his wisdom as "beyond the comprehension of the average citizen". Unlike Jadid's neo-Ba'athism, Assadism did not promote atheism and relied on more traditional ideas, for example rejecting the doctrine of exporting socialist revolution and the Maoist strategy of "people's war". Assadism supported the formation of a strong standard army (rather than the support of proxy forces, as was the case under Jadid), and the formation of a coalition with non-Ba'athist organizations in Syria (which was also rejected by the Jadid regime), which eventually resulted in the formation of the National Progressive Front. Syrian state propaganda cast Assadism as a neo-Ba'athist current that evolved Ba'athist ideology with the needs of the modern era.

== Autocracy, succession, and death ==
Assad's first choice of successor was his brother Rifaat al-Assad, an idea he broached as early as 1980, and his brother's coup attempt weakened the institutionalised power structure on which he based his rule. Instead of changing his policy, Assad tried to protect his power by honing his governmental model. He gave a larger role to his eldest son, Bassel al-Assad, who was rumored to be his father's planned successor; this kindled jealousy within the government.

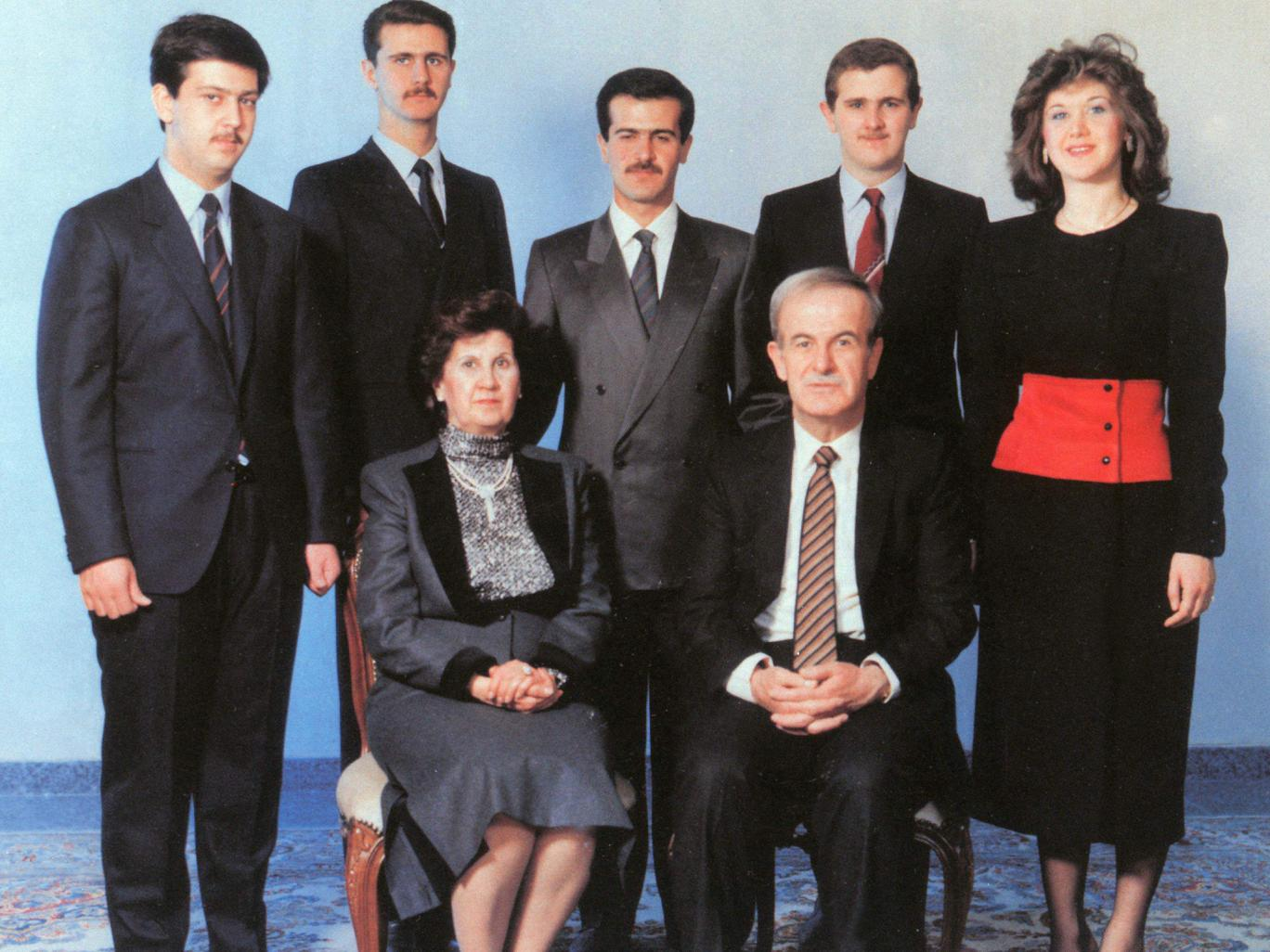
Assad and his wife, Anisa Makhlouf; back row, left to right: Maher, Bashar, Bassel, Majd and Bushra al-Assad, circa 1992-93

At a 1994 military meeting, Chief of Staff Shihabi said that since Assad wanted to normalize relations with Israel, the Syrian military had to withdraw its troops from the Golan Heights. Haydar replied angrily, "We have become nonentities. We were not even consulted." When he heard about Haydar's outburst, Assad replaced Haydar as Commander of Special Forces with the Alawite Major General Ali Habib. Haydar also reportedly opposed dynastic succession, keeping his views secret until after Bassel's death in 1994 (when Assad chose Bashar al-Assad to succeed him); he then openly criticised Assad's succession plans.

Abdul Halim Khaddam, Syria's foreign minister from 1970 to 1984, opposed dynastic succession on the grounds that it was not socialist. Khaddam has said that Assad never discussed his intentions about succession with members of the Regional Command. By the 1990s, the Sunni faction of the leadership was aging; the Alawites, with Assad's help, had received a new base. The Sunnis were at a disadvantage since many were opposed to any kind of dynastic succession.

After [Assad's] illness [in 1983] this matter was too sensitive to be discussed. His love for the family was even stronger than his duty as president. The decision was very wrong. This decision was in total contradiction to all laws and regulations in Syria. In the late 1990s, when he was becoming sicker, this sentiment grew stronger and stronger.

— Abdul Halim Khaddam, on Assad's succession plans

After returning to Syria, Bashar al-Assad enrolled in the Homs Military Academy. He was quickly promoted to Brigadier Commander, and served for a time in the Republican Guard. He studied most military subjects, "including a tank battalion commander, command and staff" (the latter two of which were required for a senior command in the Syrian army). Bashar al-Assad was promoted to lieutenant colonel in July 1997, and to colonel in January 1999. Official sources ascribe Bashar's rapid promotion to his "overall excellence in the staff officers' course, and in the outstanding final project he submitted as part of the course for command and staff". With Bashar's training, Assad appointed a new generation of Alawite security officers to secure his succession plans. Shihabi's replacement by Aslan as Chief of Staff on 1 July 1998—Shihabi was considered a potential successor by the outside world—marked the end of the long security-apparatus overhaul. Skepticism of Assad's dynastic-succession plan was widespread within and outside the government, with critics noting that Syria was not a monarchy. By 1998 Bashar had made inroads into the Ba'ath Party, taking over Khaddam's Lebanon portfolio (a post he had held since the 1970s). By December 1998 Bashar al-Assad had replaced Rafic al-Hariri, Prime Minister of Lebanon and one of Khaddam's proteges, with Salim al-Huss. Several Assad proteges, who had served since 1970 or earlier, were dismissed from office between 1998 and 2000. They were sacked not because of disloyalty to Assad, but because Assad thought they would not fully support Bashar al-Assad's succession. "Retirees" included Muhammad al-Khuli, Nassir Khayr Bek and Ali Duba. Among the new appointees (Bashar loyalists) were Bahjat Sulayman, Major General Hassan Khalil and Major General Assef Shawkat (Assad's son-in-law).

By the late 1990s, Assad's health had deteriorated. American diplomats said Assad had difficulty staying focused and seemed tired during their meetings; he was seen as incapable of functioning for more than two hours a day. Because of his increasing seclusion from state affairs, the government became accustomed to working without his involvement in day-to-day affairs. Nearly all of his administrative tasks and even much of the important decision making was allegedly being delegated to his daughter, Bushra, who set up her own office next to her father in the Presidential Palace. Bushra, long believed to have been Assad's favorite child and, had it not been for her gender, preferred candidate for succession, had a negative view towards Bashar's ability to succeed Hafez and was allegedly mounting her own attempt at amassing power to succeed him. His spokesperson ignored the speculation, and Assad's official routine in 1999 was basically unchanged from the previous decade. Assad continued to conduct meetings, traveling abroad occasionally; he visited Moscow in July 1999.

On 26 March 2000, Assad embarked on another rare foreign trip to Geneva to meet with American president Bill Clinton.

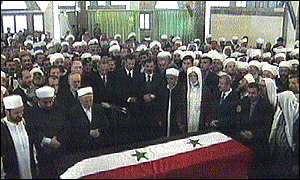
People praying during the funeral

On 10 June 2000, at the age of 69, Hafez al-Assad died of a heart attack while on the telephone with Lebanese prime minister Salim al-Huss. A period of 40 days of mourning was declared in Syria and 7 days in Lebanon thereafter. Egypt, Iran, Jordan, Oman, Palestine, Libya, Morocco, United Arab Emirates, Yemen, Kuwait and Qatar announced three days of national mourning. His funeral was held three days later. The Israeli prime minister Ehud Barak said that with the death of Assad, an era has ended in the Middle East.

Assad was buried in his hometown of Qardaha alongside his son Bassel, in what became known as the "Immortal Leader's Mausoleum". After Hafez al-Assad's death, power was transferred to his son Bashar al-Assad with the support of Ba'ath loyalists, making Syria the first Arab republic to establish a dynastic system.

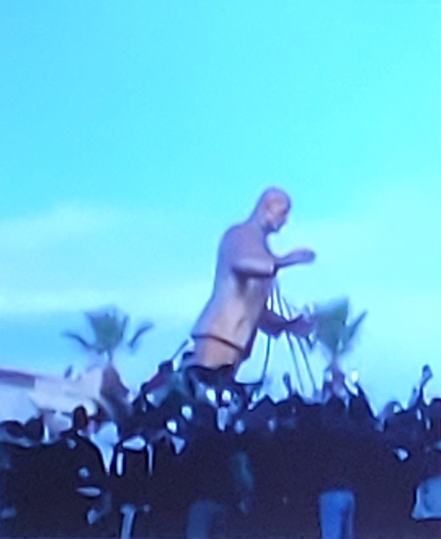
Syrian citizens toppling the statue of Hafez al-Assad in Latakia, in 2024, which came to symbolize the fall of the Assad regime

On 11 December 2024, after the overthrow of his son Bashar following 13 years of civil war and 656,493 lives lost, (199,068 of them civilian), rebels set fire and burned Hafez al-Assad's tomb inside the mausoleum. Videos of armed men burning Assad's grave and desecrated on it were published online. On 28 April 2025, videos and photos on social media showed his grave being exhumed by unidentified individuals. His remains were reportedly transferred to an unknown location.

== Legacy ==
Hafez al-Assad was one of the key figures in the Middle East, who exerted considerable influence on the politics of the entire region. The New York Times put it, "No lasting peace could hold without him, but none could be negotiated with him either." Assad was able to build a stable state: his work in domestic policies of expanding infrastructure, medical and educational services, strengthening central authority, and intensive militarization of society, and foreign policy, which consisted of a consistent fight "against imperialism and Israel," have turned Syria into a closed regional power, whose views could not be ignored. His ability to get out of difficult situations, convince others and achieve favorable conditions for himself impressed some diplomats who interacted with him. As The New York Times wrote, "Mr. Assad most sought to create a legacy, remaking Syria into a power among the Arabs rather than a political football".

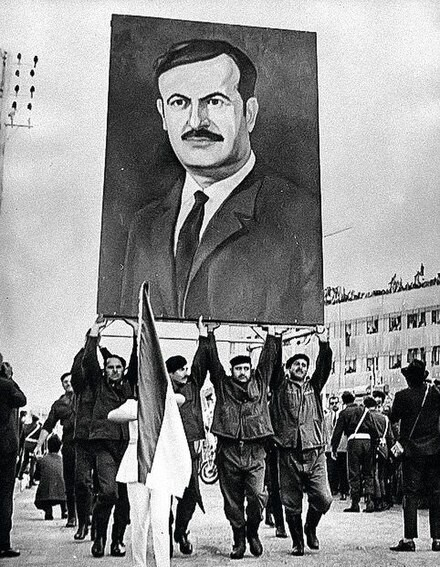
Syrians marching with portrait of Assad

Critics of Hafez al-Assad, including a number of law enforcement organizations have called his regime a brutal dictatorship responsible for the suffering and death of hundreds of thousands of people, and have repeatedly condemned his totalitarian state for gross human rights violations. Assad deployed repressive measures ranging from censorship to violent methods of state terror such as mass murders, deportations and practices such as torture, which were unleashed collectively upon the civilian population. For example, SS-Haupsturmfuhrer Alois Brunner, who played a significant role in the implementation of the Holocaust as the right-hand man of Adolf Eichmann, assisted al-Assad in organizing the Ba'athist secret police and trained them on Nazi Germany's torture practices. A 1983 report published by Amnesty International revealed that Assad regime routinely committed mass-executions of alleged dissidents and engaged in the extensive torture of prisoners of conscience. Various torture methods in Syrian prisons include electrocutions, ablazing, sexual violence, castration, etc. Assad left behind a hereditary dictatorship that eventually sparked a civil war and a personality cult even more widespread than in Maoist China or Josip Broz Tito's Yugoslavia.

== Foreign honours ==
- Austria
  - Grand Star of the Decoration of Honour for Services to the Republic of Austria, 1988
- Czechoslovakia
  - Collar of the Order of the White Lion, 9 August 1975
- East Germany
  - Grand Star of Peoples' Friendship, 1 October 1978
- Lebanon
  - National Order of the Cedar
- Poland
  - Grand Cross of the Order of Polonia Restituta, 1973
- Socialist Republic of Romania
  - Order of the Star of the Romanian Socialist Republic, First Class, 1974
- Yugoslavia
  - Order of the Yugoslav Star, 1974

== Notes ==
Political offices
Preceded by Muhammad Umran	Minister of Defense of Syria; 1966–1972	Succeeded by Mustafa Tlass
Preceded by Nureddin al-Atassi	Prime Minister of Syria; 1970–1971	Succeeded by Abdul Rahman Kleifawi
Preceded by Ahmad al-Khatib; Acting	President of Syria; 1971–2000	Succeeded by Abdul Halim Khaddam; Acting
Party political offices
Preceded by Nureddin al-Atassi	Secretary of the Syrian Regional Command of the Arab Socialist Ba'ath Party; 1970–2000	Succeeded by Bashar al-Assad
