= Modern history of Syria =

Period in history of Syria

Flag of the Arab Kingdom of Syria (1920)

Flag of Syria under French mandate (1920–1922)

Flag of the Syrian Federation, later State of Syria under French mandate (1922–1925 and 1925–1930)

Flag of the Syrian Republic (1932–1958), and again from 1961 to 1963

Flag of the United Arab Republic (1958–1961) and again of the Arab Republic of Syria from 1980 to 2024

Flag of the Syrian Arab Republic 1963–1972

Flag of the Syrian Arab Republic, 1972–1980

The modern history of Syria begins with the termination of Ottoman control of Syria by French forces and the establishment of the Occupied Enemy Territory Administration during World War I. The short-lived Arab Kingdom of Syria emerged in 1920, which was however soon committed under the French Mandate, which produced the short-lived autonomous State of Aleppo, State of Damascus (later State of Syria), Alawite State and Jabal al-Druze (state); the autonomies were transformed into the Mandatory Syrian Republic in 1930. Syrian Republic gained independence in April 1946. The Republic took part in the Arab–Israeli War and remained in a state of political instability during the 1950s and 1960s.

The 8 March 1963 coup resulted in the installation of the National Council for the Revolutionary Command (NCRC), a group of military and civilian officials who assumed control of all executive and legislative authority. The takeover was engineered by members of the Ba'ath Party led by Michel Aflaq and Salah al-Din al-Bitar. He was overthrown in early 1966 by Marxist–Leninist military dissidents of the party led by General Salah Jadid. After the Arab Spring of 2011, Bashar al-Assad's government was embroiled in the ongoing Syrian civil war.

On 8 December 2024, Bashar al-Assad fled to Russia after rebels seized the capital city of Damascus, resulting in the fall of the Assad regime and establishment of a caretaker government. Following the fall of the Assad regime, Syria entered a political transition under a transitional government on 29 March 2025, headed by president Ahmed al-Sharaa.

== Syria under the Mandate ==
=== OETA ===
The Occupied Enemy Territory Administration (OETA) was a joint British and French military administration over Levantine and Mesopotamian provinces of the former Ottoman Empire between 1918 and 1920, set up following the Sinai and Palestine Campaign of World War I. The administration ended following the assignment of the Mandate for Syria and the Lebanon and British Mandate for Palestine at the 19–26 April 1920 San Remo conference.

=== Initial civil administration ===
Following the San Remo conference in April 1920 and the defeat of King Faisal's short-lived monarchy in Syria at the Battle of Maysalun on 24 July 1920, the French general Henri Gouraud established civil administration in the territory. The mandate region was subdivided into six states. They were the states of Damascus (1920), Aleppo (1920), Alawites (1920), Jabal Druze (1921), the autonomous Sanjak of Alexandretta (1921) (modern-day Hatay), and the State of Greater Lebanon (1920), which later became the modern country of Lebanon.

The drawing of those states was based in part on the sectarian make-up on the ground in Syria. However, nearly all the Syrian sects were hostile to the French mandate and to the division it created. This was best demonstrated by the numerous revolts that the French encountered in all of the Syrian states. Maronite Christians of Mount Lebanon, on the other hand, were a community with a dream of independence that was being realized under the French; therefore, Greater Lebanon was the exception to the newly formed states.

=== Syrian Federation (1922-24) ===
In July 1922, France established a loose federation between three of the states: Damascus, Aleppo, and the Alawite state under the name of the Syrian Federation (Fédération syrienne). Jabal Druze, Sanjak of Alexandretta, and Greater Lebanon were not parts of this federation, which adopted a new federal flag (green-white-green with French canton). On 1 December 1924, the Alawite state seceded from the federation when the states of Aleppo and Damascus were united into the State of Syria.

=== The Great Syrian Revolt ===
In 1925, a revolt in Jabal Druze led by Sultan Pasha al-Atrash spread to other Syrian states and became a general rebellion in Syria. France tried to retaliate by having the parliament of Aleppo declare secession from the union with Damascus, but the voting was foiled by Syrian patriots.

=== First Syrian Republic ===
The red stars that represented the three districts of the republic (Damascus, Aleppo, and Deir ez Zor).

=== 1936 Independence treaty ===
In 1936, the Franco-Syrian Treaty of Independence was signed, a treaty that would not be ratified by the French legislature. However, the treaty allowed Jabal Druze, the Alawite (now called Latakia), and Alexandretta to be incorporated into the Syrian republic within the following two years. Greater Lebanon (now the Lebanese Republic) was the only state that did not join the Syrian Republic. Hashim al-Atassi, who was Prime Minister under King Faisal's brief reign (1918–1920), was the first president to be elected under a new constitution adopted after the independence treaty.

=== Separation of Hatay ===
In September 1938, France again separated the Syrian district of Alexandretta and transformed it into the Republic of Hatay. The Republic of Hatay joined Turkey in the following year, in June 1939. Syria did not recognize the incorporation of Hatay into Turkey and the issue is still disputed until the present time.

== World War II and the founding of the UN ==
With the fall of France in 1940 during World War II, Syria came under the control of the Vichy Government until the British and Free French invaded and occupied the country in July 1941. Syria proclaimed its independence again in 1941 but it was not until 1 January 1944 that it was recognized as an independent republic.

On 27 September 1941, France proclaimed, by virtue of, and within the framework of the Mandate, the independence and sovereignty of the Syrian State. The proclamation said "the independence and sovereignty of Syria and Lebanon will not affect the juridical situation as it results from the Mandate Act. Indeed, this situation could be changed only with the agreement of the Council of the League of Nations, with the consent of the Government of the United States, a signatory of the Franco-American Convention of 4 April 1924, and only after the conclusion between the French Government and the Syrian and Lebanese Governments of treaties duly ratified in accordance with the laws of the French Republic.

Benqt Broms said that it was important to note that there were several founding members of the United Nations whose statehood was doubtful at the time of the San Francisco Conference and that the Government of France still considered Syria and Lebanon to be mandates.

Duncan Hall said "Thus, the Syrian mandate may be said to have been terminated without any formal action on the part of the League or its successor. The mandate was terminated by the declaration of the mandatory power, and of the new states themselves, of their independence, followed by a process of piecemeal unconditional recognition by other powers, culminating in formal admission to the United Nations. Article 78 of the Charter ended the status of tutelage for any member state: 'The trusteeship system shall not apply to territories which have become Members of the United Nations, relationship among which shall be based on respect for the principle of sovereign equality.'"

On 29 May 1945, France bombed Damascus and tried to arrest its democratically elected leaders. While French planes were bombing Damascus, Prime Minister Faris al-Khoury was at the founding conference of the United Nations in San Francisco, presenting Syria's claim for independence from the French Mandate. Continuing pressure from Syrian nationalist groups and British pressure forced the French to evacuate their last troops on 17 April 1946.

== Syrian Republic (1946–1963) ==
Syrian independence was acquired in 1946. Although rapid economic development followed the declaration of independence, Syrian politics from independence through the late 1960s was marked by upheaval. The early years of independence were marked by political instability.

In 1948, Syria was involved in the Arab–Israeli War with the newly created State of Israel. The Syrian army was pressed out of the Israeli areas, but fortified their strongholds on the Golan and managed to keep their old borders and occupy some additional territory. In July 1949, Syria was the last Arab country to sign an armistice agreement with Israel.

In March 1949, Syria's national government was overthrown by a military coup d'état led by Husni al-Zaim in a coup. Some authors claim involvement by the United States CIA.

Later that year Zaim was overthrown by his colleague Sami al-Hinnawi and Adib al-Shishakli. The latter undermined civilian rule and led to Shishakli's complete seizure of power in 1951. Shishakli continued to rule the country until 1955, when growing public opposition forced him to resign and leave the country. The national government was restored, but again to face instability, this time from abroad. After the overthrow of President Shishakli in a 1954 coup, continued political maneuvering supported by competing factions in the military eventually brought Arab nationalist and socialist elements to power. Between 1946 and 1956, Syria had 20 different cabinets and drafted four separate constitutions.

During the Suez Crisis of 1956, after the invasion of the Sinai Peninsula by Israeli troops, and the intervention of British and French troops, martial law was declared in Syria. Later Syrian and Iraqi troops were brought into Jordan to prevent a possible Israeli invasion. The November 1956 attacks on Iraqi pipelines were in retaliation for Iraq's acceptance into the Baghdad Pact. In early 1957 Iraq advised Egypt and Syria against a conceivable takeover of Jordan.

In November 1956 Syria signed a pact with the Soviet Union, providing a foothold for communist influence within the government in exchange for planes, tanks, and other military equipment being sent to Syria. This increase in the strength of Syrian military technology worried Turkey, as it seemed feasible that Syria might attempt to retake Iskenderon, a formerly Syrian city now in Turkey. On the other hand, Syria and the USSR accused Turkey of amassing its troops at the Syrian border. During this standoff, communists gained more control over the Syrian government and military. Only heated debates in the United Nations (of which Syria was an original member) lessened the threat of war.

Syria's political instability during the years after the 1954 coup, the parallelism of Syrian and Egyptian policies, and the appeal of Egyptian President Gamal Abdal Nasser's leadership in the wake of the Suez crisis created support in Syria for union with Egypt. On 1 February 1958, Syrian president Shukri al-Kuwatli and Nasser announced the merging of the two countries, creating the United Arab Republic, and all Syrian political parties, as well as the Communists therein, ceased overt activities.

The union was not a success, however. Following a military coup on 28 September 1961, Syria seceded, reestablishing itself as the Syrian Arab Republic. Instability characterised the next 18 months, with various coups culminating on 8 March 1963, in the installation by leftist Syrian Army officers of the National Council of the Revolutionary Command (NCRC), a group of military and civilian officials who assumed control of all executive and legislative authority. The takeover was engineered by members of the Arab Socialist Resurrection Party (Ba'ath Party), which had been active in Syria and other Arab countries since the late 1940s. The new cabinet was dominated by Ba'ath members.

== Ba'athist Syrian Arab Republic (1963–2024) ==
=== First Ba'ath government ===
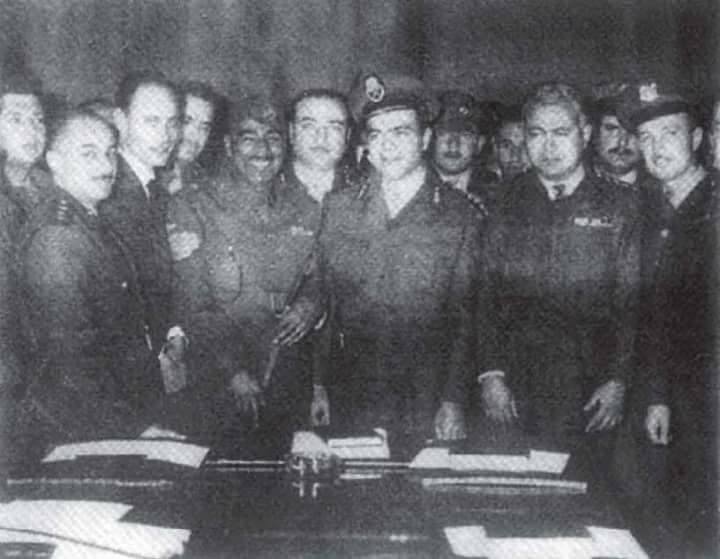
Syrian military officers after the coup, 1963.

The Ba'ath takeover in Syria followed a Ba'ath coup in Iraq, the previous month. The new Syrian Government explored the possibility of federation with Egypt and with Ba'ath-controlled Iraq. An agreement was concluded in Cairo on 17 April 1963, for a referendum on unity to be held in September 1963. However, serious disagreements among the parties soon developed, and the tripartite federation failed to materialize. Thereafter, the Ba'ath governments in Syria and Iraq began to work for bilateral unity. These plans foundered in November 1963, when the Ba'ath government in Iraq was overthrown.

In May 1964, President Amin al-Hafiz of the NCRC promulgated a provisional constitution providing for a National Council of the Revolution (NCR), an appointed legislature composed of representatives of mass organisations—labour, peasant, and professional unions—a presidential council, in which executive power was vested, and a cabinet.

=== Second Ba'ath government ===
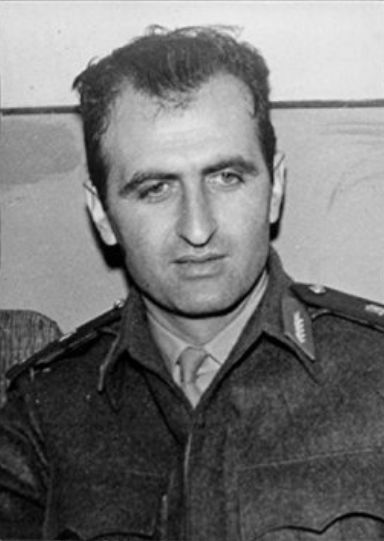
Leader of the coup Salah Jadid, 1968.

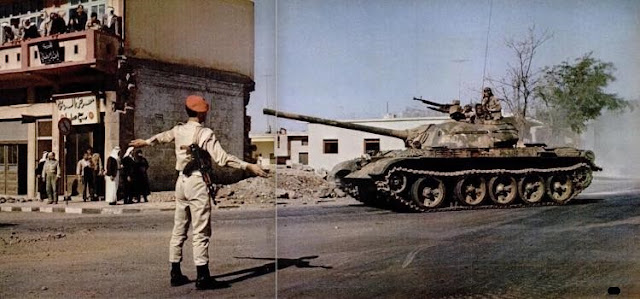
A Ba'athist Syrian tank in Jordan.

On 23 February 1966, a group of army officers carried out a successful, intra-party coup, imprisoned President Hafiz, dissolved the cabinet and the NCRC, abrogated the provisional constitution, and designated a regionalist, civilian Ba'ath government on 1 March. The coup leaders described it as a "rectification" of Ba'ath Party principles. In June 1967 Israel captured and occupied the Golan Heights. The Six Day War had significantly weakened the radical socialist government established by the 1966 coup.

On 18 September 1970, during the events of Black September in Jordan, Syria tried to intervene on behalf of the Palestinian guerrillas. Hafez al-Assad sent in armored forces equivalent to a brigade, with tanks, some of them allegedly hastily rebranded from the regular Syrian army for the purpose. Other Syrian units were the 5th Infantry Division and Commandos. On 21 September, the Syrian 5th Division broke through the defenses of the Jordanian 40th Armoured Brigade, and pushed it back off the ar-Ramtha crossroads. On 22 September, the Royal Jordanian Air Force began attacking Syrian forces, which were badly battered as a result. The constant airstrikes broke the Syrian force, and on the late afternoon of 22 September, the 5th Division began to retreat. The swift Syrian withdrawal was a severe blow to Palestinian guerillas. Jordanian armored forces steadily pounded their headquarters in Amman, and threatened to break them in other regions of the Kingdom as well. Eventually, the Palestinian factions agreed to a cease-fire. King Hussein and Yasser Arafat attended the meeting of the Arab League in Cairo, where the hostilities briefly ended. The Jordanian-Palestinian Civil War shortly resumed, but without Syrian intervention.

By 1970 a conflict had developed between an extremist military wing and a more moderate civilian wing of the Ba'ath Party. The 1970 retreat of Syrian forces sent to aid the PLO during the "Black September" hostilities with Jordan reflected this political disagreement within the ruling Ba'ath leadership.

=== Ba'ath Party under Hafez al-Assad, 1970–2000 ===
==== Power takeover ====
On 13 November 1970, Minister of Defense Hafez al-Assad effected a bloodless military coup, ousting the civilian party leadership and assuming the role of President. Upon assuming power, Hafez al-Assad moved quickly to create an organizational infrastructure for his government and to consolidate control. The Provisional Regional Command of Assad's Arab Socialist Ba'ath Party nominated a 173-member legislature, the People's Council, in which the Ba'ath Party took 87 seats. The remaining seats were divided among "popular organizations" and other minor parties.

In March 1971, the party held its regional congress and elected a new 21-member Regional Command headed by Assad. In the same month, a national referendum was held to confirm Assad as president for a 7-year term. In March 1972, to broaden the base of his government, Assad formed the National Progressive Front, a coalition of parties led by the Ba'ath Party, and elections were held to establish local councils in each of Syria's 14 governorates. In March 1973, a new Syrian constitution went into effect followed shortly thereafter by parliamentary elections for the People's Council, the first such elections since 1962.

==== October War ====
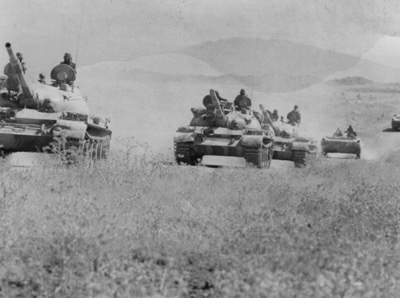
Column of Syrian tanks in the Golan Heights, 1973.

On 6 October 1973, Syria and Egypt began the Yom Kippur War (also called the "Ramadan War" or "October War" because Syria and Egypt attacked during Muslim Ramadan holiday) by staging a surprise attack against Israel. Despite the element of surprise, Egypt and Syria lost their initial gains in a three-week-long warfare, and Israel continued to occupy the Golan Heights and the Sinai peninsula.

==== Intervention in Lebanon ====
In early 1976, the Lebanese Civil War was going poorly for the Maronite Christians, so the Lebanese President Elias Sarkis officially requested Syria intervene militarily. After receiving their first mandate from the Lebanese President, Syria was given a second mandate by the Arab League to intervene militarily in Lebanon. Syria sent 40,000 troops into the country to prevent the Christians from being overrun, but soon became embroiled in this war, beginning the 30 year Syrian presence in Lebanon. Over the following 15 years of civil war, Syria fought both for control over Lebanon, and as an attempt to undermine Israel in southern Lebanon, through extensive use of Lebanese allies as proxy fighters. Many saw the Syrian Army's presence in Lebanon as an occupation, especially following the end of the civil war in 1990, after the Syrian-sponsored Taif Agreement. Syria then remained in Lebanon until 2005, exerting a heavy-handed influence over Lebanese politics, that was deeply resented by many.

About one million Syrian workers came into Lebanon after the war ended to find jobs in the reconstruction of the country. Syrian workers were preferred over Palestinian Arabs and Lebanese workers because they could be paid lower wages, but some have argued that the Syrian government's encouragement of citizens entering its small and militarily dominated neighbor in search of work, was in fact an attempt at Syrian colonization of Lebanon. In 1994, under pressure from Damascus, the Lebanese government controversially granted citizenship to over 200,000 Syrians resident in the country.

==== Muslim Brotherhood uprising and Hama Massacre ====
On 31 January 1973, Assad implemented the new Constitution which led to a national crisis. Unlike previous constitutions, this one did not require that the president of Syria must be a Muslim, leading to fierce demonstrations in Hama, Homs and Aleppo organized by the Muslim Brotherhood and the ulama. They labeled Assad as the "enemy of Allah" and called for a jihad against his rule. Robert D. Kaplan has compared Assad's coming to power to "an untouchable becoming maharajah in India or a Jew becoming tsar in Russia—an unprecedented development shocking to the Sunni majority population which had monopolized power for so many centuries." The authoritarian government was not without its critics, a serious challenge arose in the late 1970s from fundamentalist Sunni Muslims, who reject the basic values of the secular Ba'ath program and object to rule by the Alawis whom they consider heretical. From 1976 until its suppression in 1982, the arch-conservative Muslim Brotherhood led an armed insurgency against the government. In response to an attempted uprising by the brotherhood in February 1982, the government crushed the fundamentalist opposition centered in the city of Hama, leveling parts of the city with artillery fire and causing many thousands of dead and wounded. During the rest of Hafez al-Assad's reign, public manifestations of anti-government activity were very limited.

==== During Gulf War ====
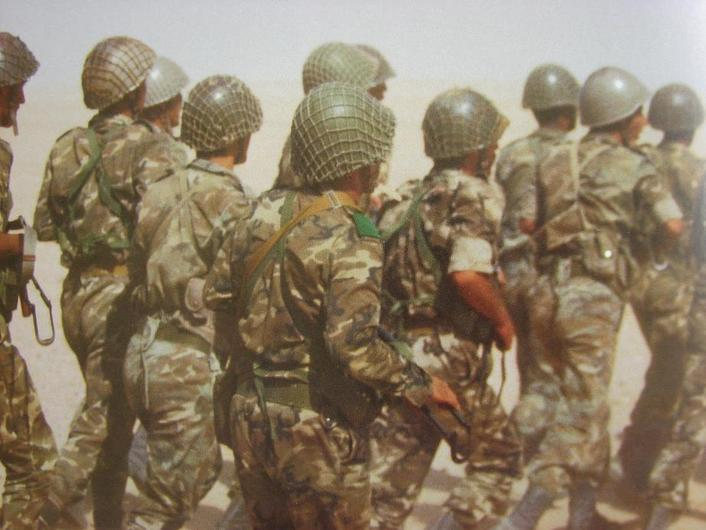
Syrian soldiers in Iraq during the Gulf war, 1991.

Syria's 1990 participation in the U.S.-led multinational coalition aligned against Saddam Hussein marked a dramatic watershed in Syria's relations both with other Arab states and with the Western world. Syria participated in the multilateral Middle East Peace Conference in Madrid in October 1991, and during the 1990s engaged in direct, face-to-face negotiations with Israel. These negotiations failed, and there have been no further Syrian-Israeli talks since President Hafez al-Assad's meeting with President Bill Clinton in Geneva in March 2000.

==== Internal power struggle ====
In what has become known as the 1999 Latakia incident, violent protests and armed clashes erupted following the 1998 People's Assembly's Elections. The violent events were an explosion of a long-running feud between Hafez al-Assad and his younger brother Rifaat, who previously attempted to initiate a coup against Hafez in 1984, but was eventually expelled from Syria. Two people were killed in fire exchanges of Syrian police and Rifaat's supporters during police crack-down on Rifaat's port compound in Latakia. According to opposition sources, denied by the government, the clashes in Latakia resulted in hundreds of dead and injured.

==== Drought in Syria ====
From 2006 to 2010, Syria experienced its worst drought in modern history. The drought resulted in a mass migration from the Syrian countryside into urban centers, which notably strained existing infrastructure already burdened by the influx of some 1.5 million refugees from Iraq. The drought itself has been linked to human caused global climate change. It has also been directly linked as a contributing factor to the socieoeconomic conditions that led to initial protests and uprising. Adequate water supply continues to be an issue in the ongoing civil war and the supply is frequently the target of military action.

=== Under Bashar al-Assad, 2000–2024 ===
==== The Damascus Autumn ====
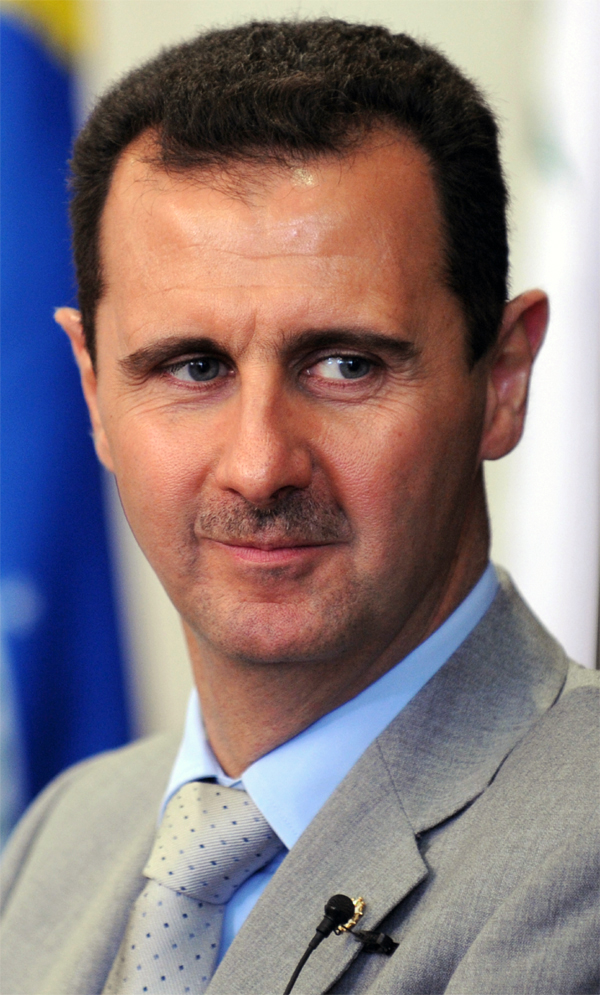
Bashar al-Assad

Hafez al-Assad died on 10 June 2000, after 30 years in power. Immediately following al-Assad's death, the Parliament amended the constitution, reducing the mandatory minimum age of the President from 40 to 34, which allowed his son, Bashar al-Assad, to become legally eligible for nomination by the ruling Ba'ath party. On 10 July 2000, Bashar al-Assad was elected president by referendum in which he ran unopposed, garnering 97.29% of the vote, according to Syrian government statistics.

Bashar, who speaks French and English and has a British-born wife, was said to have "inspired hopes" for reform, and a "Damascus Spring" of intense political and social debate took place from July 2000 to August 2001. The period was characterized by the emergence of numerous political forums or salons where groups of like minded people met in private houses to debate political and social issues. The phenomenon of salons spread rapidly in Damascus and to a lesser extent in other cities. Political activists, such as, Riad Seif, Haitham al-Maleh, Kamal al-Labwani, Riyad al-Turk, and Aref Dalila were important in mobilizing the movement. The most famous of the forums were the Riad Seif Forum and the Jamal al-Atassi Forum. The Damascus Spring ended in August 2001 with the arrest and imprisonment of ten leading activists who had called for democratic elections and a campaign of civil disobedience.

==== International and internal tensions ====
On 5 October 2003, Israel bombed a site near Damascus, claiming it was a terrorist training facility for members of Islamic Jihad. Islamic Jihad said the camp was not in use; Syria said the attack was on a civilian area. The Israeli action was condemned by European governments. The German Chancellor said it "cannot be accepted" and the French Foreign Ministry said "The Israeli operation… constituted an unacceptable violation of international law and sovereignty rules." The Spanish UN Ambassador Inocencio Arias called it an attack of "extreme gravity" and "a clear violation of international law."

The United States Congress passed the Syria Accountability Act in December 2003, with the goal of ending what the U.S. saw as Syrian involvement in Lebanon, Iraq, terrorism, and weapons of mass destruction through international sanctions.

Ethnic tensions increased in Syria, following an incident in a football stadium in Al Qamishli, 30 people were killed and more than 160 were injured in days of clashes starting from 12 March. Kurdish sources indicated that Syrian security forces used live ammunition against civilians after clashes broke out at a football match between Kurdish fans of the local team and Arab supporters of a visiting team from the city of Deir al-Zor. The international press reported that nine people were killed on 12 March. According to Amnesty International hundreds of people, mostly Kurds, were arrested after the riots. Kurdish detainees were reportedly tortured and ill-treated. Some Kurdish students were expelled from their universities, reportedly for participating in peaceful protests.

In June 2005, thousands of Kurds demonstrated in Qamishli to protest the assassination of Sheikh Khaznawi, a Kurdish cleric in Syria, resulting in the death of one policeman and injury to four Kurds.

Renewed opposition activity occurred in October 2005 when activist Michel Kilo launched with leading opposition figures the Damascus Declaration, which criticized the Syrian government as "authoritarian, totalitarian and cliquish" and called for democratic reform.

On 6 September 2007 a Syrian facility was bombed in the Deir ez-Zor region. While no one claimed responsibility for this act, Syria accused Israel, which in turn declared that the indicated site was a nuclear facility with a military purpose. Syria denied the claim.

On 26 October 2008 helicopter-borne CIA paramilitary officers and United States Special Operations Forces carried out a raid on Syrian territory which was launched from Iraq. The Syrian government called the event a "criminal and terrorist" attack on its sovereignty, alleging all of the reported eight fatalities were civilians. An unnamed U.S. military source, however, alleged that the target was a network of foreign fighters who travel through Syria to join the Iraqi insurgency against the United States-led Coalition in Iraq and the Iraqi government.

==== Syrian civil war ====
The ongoing Syrian civil war has its roots in the Syrian revolution, which was influenced by the Arab Spring revolutions. It began in 2011 as a chain of peaceful protests, suppressed through a deadly crackdown by the Ba'athist security apparatus. In July 2011, Army defectors declared the formation of the Free Syrian Army and began forming fighting units. The war has also involved jihadi groups (al-Nusra and the more extreme Islamic State of Iraq and the Levant, the latter dominated by foreign fighters) and various foreign countries, leading to claims of a proxy war. as well as Kurdish factions.

Rebel forces, which received arms from Gulf Cooperation Council states, Turkey and some Western countries, initially made significant advances against the government forces, which were receiving financial and military support from Iran and Russia. Rebels captured the regional capitals of Raqqa in 2013 and Idlib in 2015. Consequently, Iran launched a military intervention in support of the Syrian government in 2014 and Russia followed in 2015, shifting the balance of the conflict. By late 2018, all rebel strongholds except parts of Idlib region had fallen to the government forces.

In 2014, the Islamic State won many battles against both the rebel factions and the Syrian government. Combined with simultaneous success in Iraq, the group was able to seize control of large parts of Eastern Syria and Western Iraq, prompting the US-led CJTF coalition to launch an aerial bombing campaign against it, while providing ground support and supplies to the Kurdish-majority Syrian Democratic Forces. By way of battles that culminated in the Raqqa and Deir ez-Zor offensives, the Islamic State was territorially defeated by late 2017. In August 2016, Turkey launched a multi-pronged invasion of northern Syria, in response to the creation of Rojava, while also fighting the Islamic State and government forces in the process.

According to various sources, including the United Nations, up to 100,000 people had been killed by June 2013, including 11,000 children. To escape the violence, 4.9 million Syrian refugees have fled to neighboring countries of Jordan, Iraq, Lebanon, and Turkey. Gregory Laham, then-head of Melkite Greek Catholic Church asserted that approximately 450,000 Syrian Christians had fled their homes by 2013. By October 2017, an estimated 400,000 people had been killed in the war according to the UN. In September 2022, a new UN report said it had been totally unable to deliver any supplies during the first half of 2022. As of 2022, the main external military threat and conflict were firstly, an ongoing conflict with ISIS; and secondly, ongoing concerns of possible invasion of the northeast regions of Syria by Turkish forces, in order to strike Kurdish groups in general, and Rojava in particular. An official report by the Rojava government noted Turkey-backed militias as the main threat to the region of Rojava and its government. As of 2021, more than 600,000 people had been killed in the Syrian civil war, with pro-Assad forces perpetrating more than 90% of the total civilian casualties. (Note: Sources:)

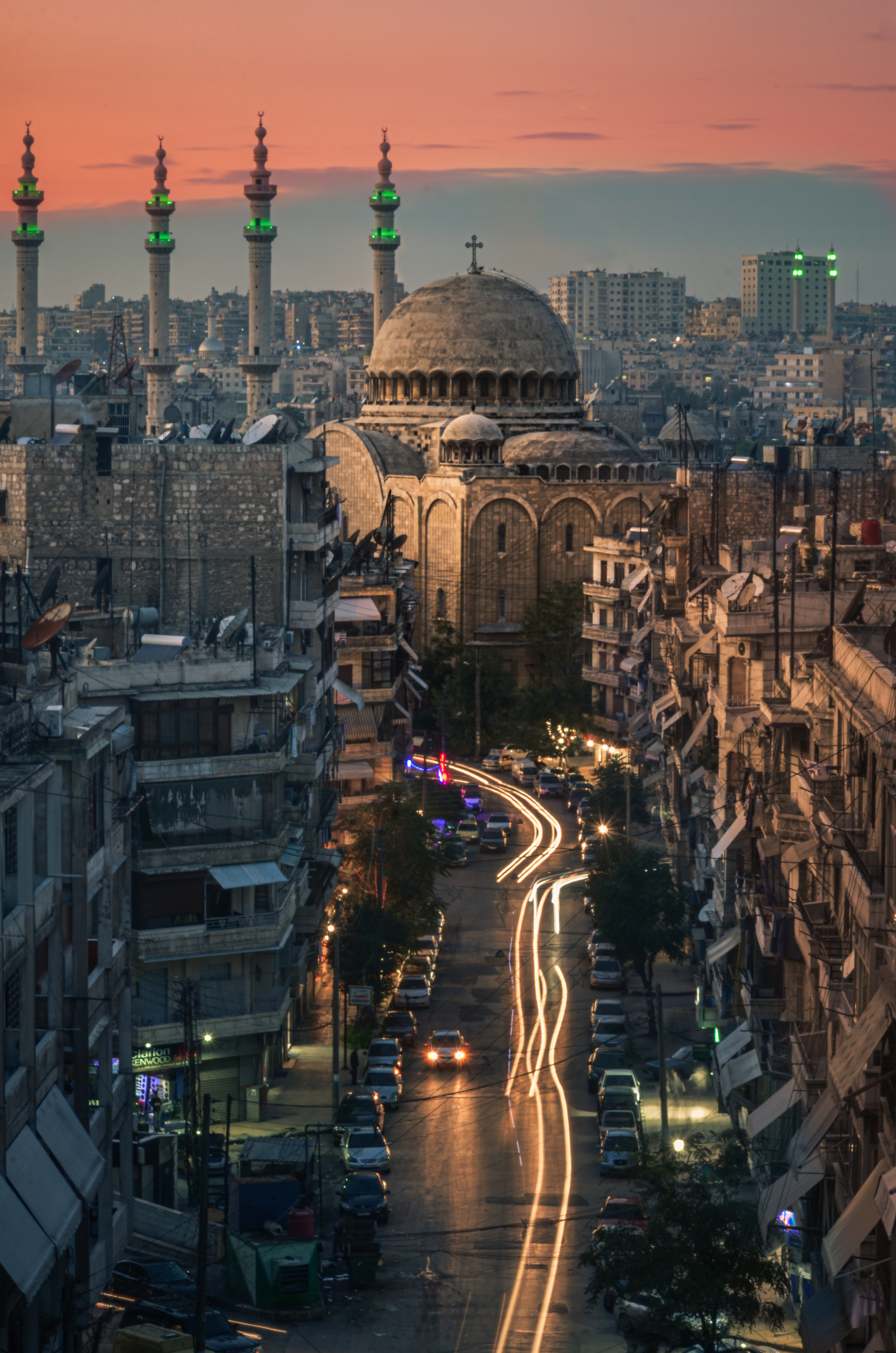
Aleppo in 2021

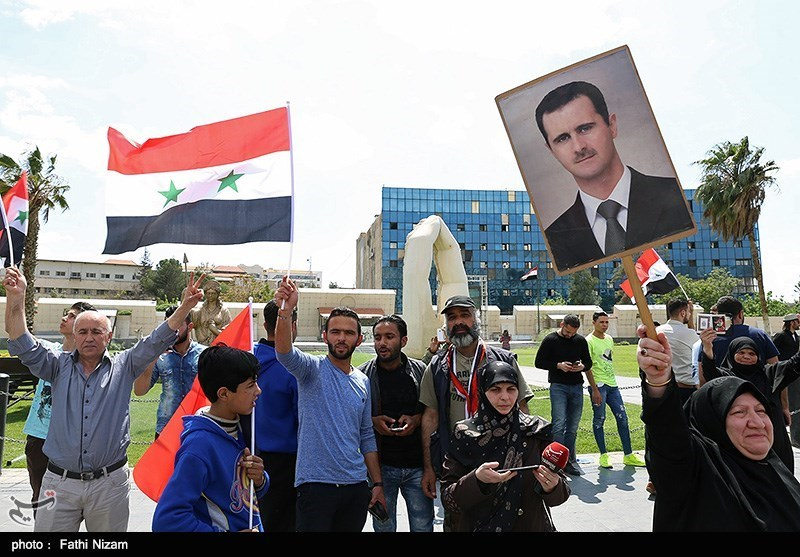
Pro-Assad demonstration in the capital Damascus after US-led missile strikes in April 2018

Between the March 2020 Idlib ceasefire and late 2024, frontline fighting mostly subsided, but there were regular skirmishes. In early 2023, reports indicated that the forces of ISIS in Syria had mostly been defeated, with only a few cells remaining in various remote locations. As of 2023, Turkey was continuing its support for various militias within Syria, which periodically attempted some operations against Kurdish groups consisting mostly of the YPG/YPJ. One stated goal was to create 30-kilometer (18.6-mile) wide "safe zones" along Turkey's border with Syria, according to a statement by Turkish President Erdoğan. The operations were generally aimed at the Tal Rifaat and Manbij regions west of the Euphrates and other areas further east. In 2022, the leader of the Syrian Democratic Forces (SDF), Mazloum Abdi, said that Kurdish forces were willing to work with Syrian government forces to defend against Turkey, saying “Damascus should use its air defense systems against Turkish planes." In July 2022, the SDF and the regime forged active plans to coordinate actively together to create defense plans to guard against invasion by Turkey. The SDF said that they felt that the main threat to Kurdish groups was an invasion by Turkey.

On 10 June 2020, hundreds of protesters returned to the streets of Sweida for the fourth consecutive day, rallying against the collapse of the country's economy, as the Syrian pound plummeted to 3,000 to the dollar within the previous week. Prime Minister Imad Khamis was dismissed by President Bashar al-Assad, amid anti-government protests over deteriorating economic conditions. The new lows for the Syrian currency, and the dramatic increase in sanctions, began to appear to raise new concerns about the survival of the Assad government. Russia continued to expand its influence and military role in the areas of Syria where the main military conflict was occurring.

2024 Syrian opposition offensives that overthrew Assad's regime in 11 days

New heavy sanctions under the US Caesar Act took effect on 17 June 2020 with additional sanctions implemented in August. There were increasing reports that food is becoming difficult to find and the country's economy was under severe pressure. As of early 2022, Syria was still facing a major economic crisis due to sanctions and other economic pressures. There was some doubt of the Syrian government's ability to pay for subsidies for the population and for basic services and programs. The UN reported there were massive problems looming for Syria's ability to feed its population in the near future. Several Arab countries began an effort to normalize relations with Syria, and to conclude a deal to provide energy supplies to Syria. This effort was led by Jordan, and included several other Arab countries.

==== Fall of the Assad regime (2024) ====
Heavy fighting renewed with a major rebel offensive in the northwest led by Tahrir al-Sham and supported by allied groups in the Turkish-backed Syrian National Army in November 2024, during which Aleppo, Hama and Homs were seized. Southern rebels who had previously reconciled with the government subsequently launched their own offensive, capturing Daraa and Suwayda. The Syrian Free Army and the Syrian Democratic Forces launched their own offensives in Palmyra and Deir ez-Zor, respectively. By 8 December, rebel forces had seized the capital, Damascus. Following this, the Assad regime collapsed, with al-Assad fleeing to Moscow. On the same day, Israel launched an invasion of Syria's Quneitra Governorate, aiming to seize the UN buffer zone in the Golan Heights. The SNA continued to clash with the SDF in and around Aleppo.

== Post-Ba'athist Syria (2024–present) ==
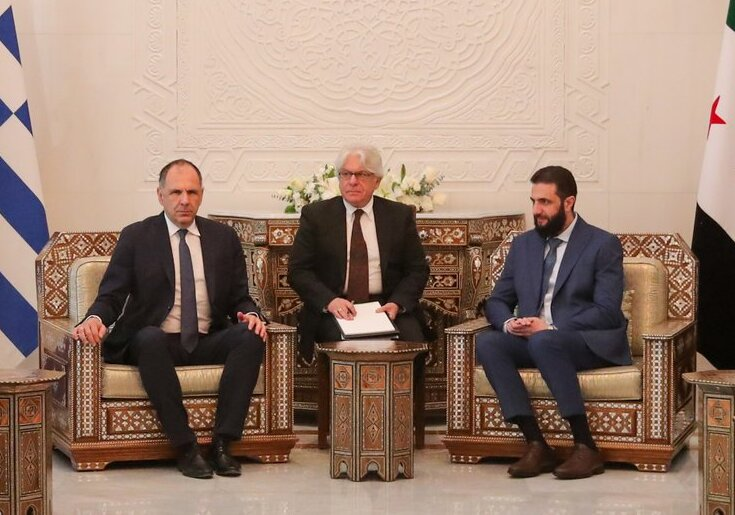
Syrian President Ahmed al-Sharaa with Greek Foreign Minister Giorgos Gerapetritis in Syria on 9 February 2025

On 8 December 2024, Syrian Prime Minister Mohammad Ghazi al-Jalali announced that the Syrian government would hand over power to a new elected government following the departure of Assad from Damascus, and Ahmed al-Sharaa announced further that al-Jalali will "supervise state institutions until they are handed over". Al-Jalali later noted to Al Arabiya that he and Ahmed al-Sharaa had been in contact prior to the announcement to discuss the handover.

Al-Sharaa subsequently became the country's de facto leader as head of the HTS. On 9 December, HTS released a video of al-Sharaa, al-Jalali and Mohammed al-Bashir, the head of the de facto government in Idlib. On the same day, following the fall of the Assad regime, the Prime Minister of the Syrian Salvation Government, al-Bashir, was tasked with forming a transitional government after meeting with al-Sharaa and outgoing Syrian Prime Minister al-Jalali to coordinate the transfer of power. The next day, he was officially appointed by the Syrian General Command as the prime minister of the transitional government.

Shortly after the fall of the Assad regime, Israel commenced a ground invasion of the Purple Line buffer zone near the Golan Heights, as well as commencing a series of airstrikes against Syrian military depots and naval bases. The Israeli Defense Forces claims that it is destroying Ba'athist military infrastructure, including chemical weapons plants, so that the rebels cannot use them. Despite the collapse of the Assad regime, Turkish-backed Syrian National Army fighters in northern Syria continued their offensive against U.S.-backed Syrian Democratic Forces (SDF) forces until a ceasefire was reached on 11 December.

After the regime change, al-Sharaa was formally appointed as the President of Syria by the Syrian General Command for the transitional period during the Syrian Revolution Victory Conference in Damascus on 29 January 2025. On 8 March 2025, the UK-based SOHR reported that Syrian security forces and pro-government fighters had committed a massacre of more than 700 Alawite civilians during clashes in western Syria. On 10 March 2025, the SDF agreed to merge with the Syrian Armed Forces after SDF leader Mazloum Abdi met with al-Sharaa. Three days later al-Sharaa signed an interim constitution covering a five-year transitional period. On 29 March 2025, the Syrian transitional government was announced by al-Sharaa at a ceremony at the Presidential Palace in Damascus, in which the new ministers were sworn in and delivered speeches outlining their agendas. The government replaced the Syrian caretaker government, which was formed following the fall of the Assad regime.

== See also ==
- Politics of Syria
- Foreign relations of Syria
