= Syrian protests =

Syrian protests may refer to:

- 1936 Syrian general strike
- 1964 Hama riot
- 1999 Latakia protests
- 2004 Al-Qamishli riots
- Syrian revolution (2011–2024)
- Syrian protests (2016)
- Southern Syria protests (2023–24)

== See also ==
- History of Syria
