= Rifaat al-Assad =

Syrian vice president (1984–1998)

Major General Rifaat al-Assad
- رفعت الأسد
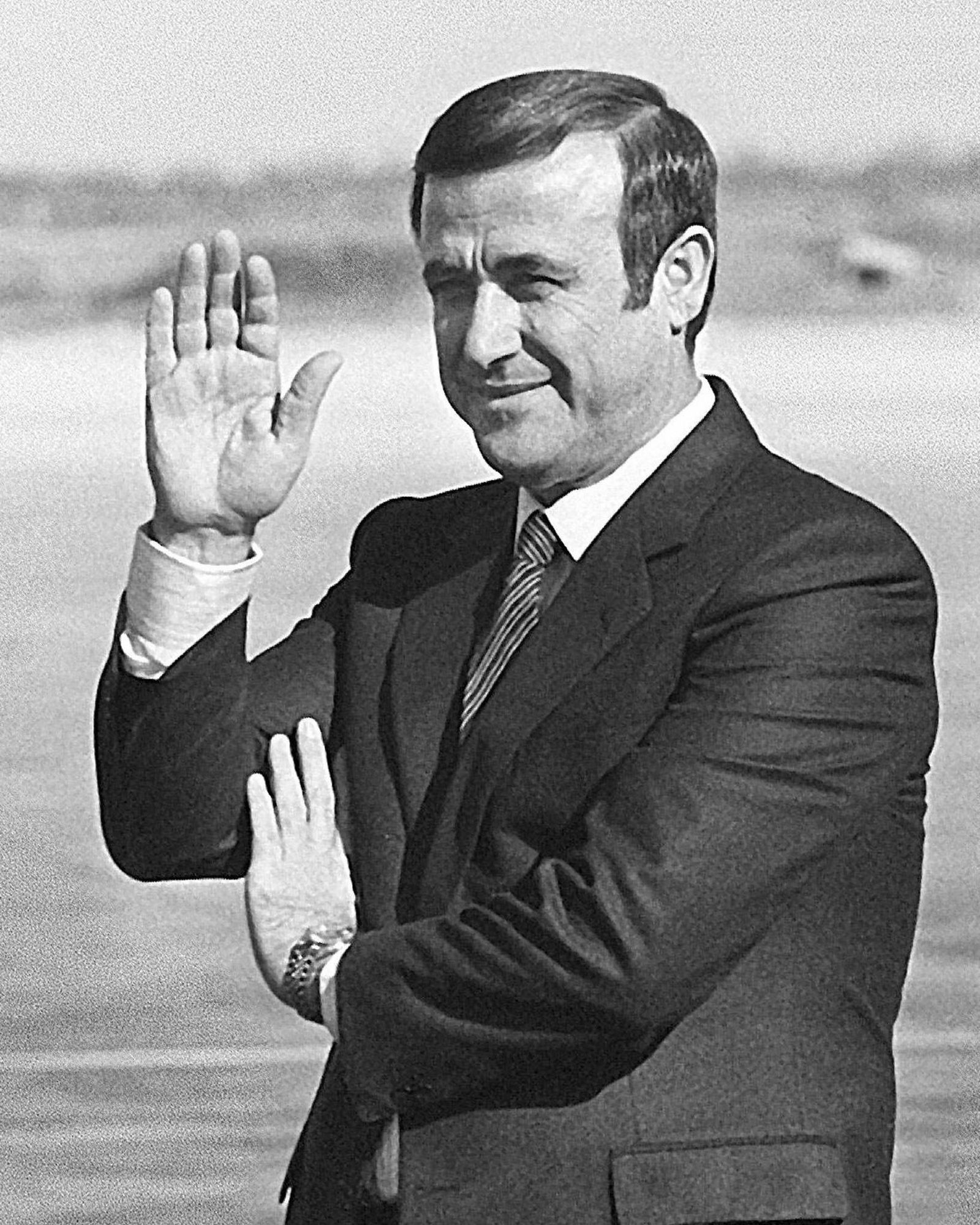
- Assad, c. 1980s

Vice President of Syria
- In office 11 March 1984 – 8 February 1998 Serving with Abdul Halim Khaddam and Zuhair Masharqa
- President: Hafez al-Assad

Member of the Regional Command of the Syrian Regional Branch
- In office 15 April 1975 – 8 February 1998

Personal details
- Born: 22 August 1937 Qardaha, Syrian Republic
- Died: 20 January 2026 (aged 88) Dubai, United Arab Emirates
- Party: Ba'ath Party
- Spouses: Amira al-Assad; Sana' Makhluf; Rajaa Bakrat; Lina al-Khayer
- Children: Siwar al-Assad; Ribal al-Assad; Firas al-Assad
- Parent: Ali al-Assad (father)
- Relatives: Jamil al-Assad (brother); Hafez al-Assad (brother); Bashar al-Assad (nephew); Maher al-Assad (nephew)
- Education: Damascus University (BA); Soviet Academy of Sciences (PhD)

Military service
- Allegiance: United Arab Republic (1958–1961); Second Syrian Republic (1961–1963); Ba'athist Syria (1963‍–‍1984)
- Branch: Syrian Arab Army; Defense Companies
- Service years: 1958–1984
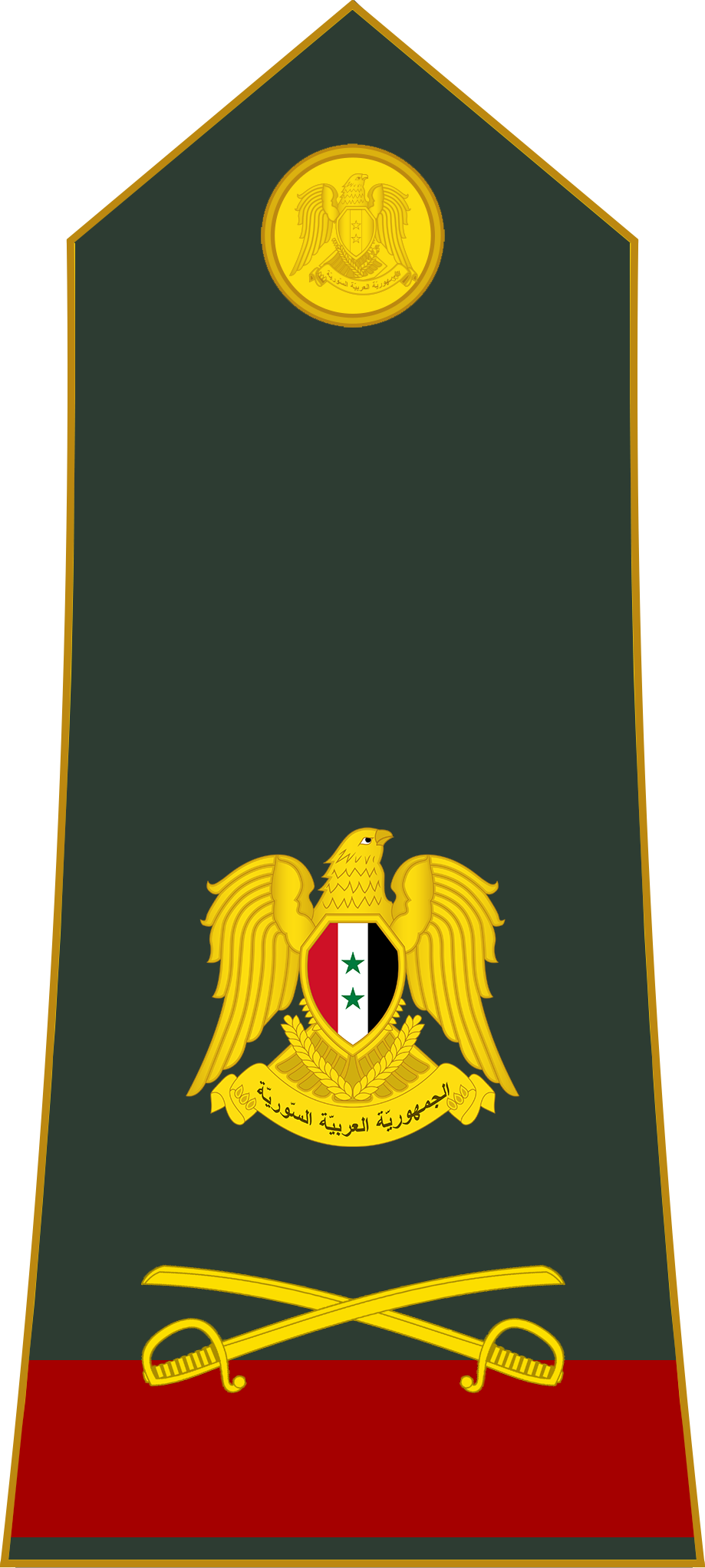
- Rank: Major General
- Commands: Defense Companies
- Conflicts: Six-Day War; 1970 Corrective Coup; Yom Kippur War; Lebanese civil war; Islamist uprising in Syria; 1982 Hama massacre; 1984 Syrian coup attempt; 1999 Latakia protests

Rifaat Ali Suleiman al-Assad (Arabic: رِفْعَتُ عَلِيِّ ٱلْأَسَدِ, romanized: Rifʿat al-ʾAsad; 22 August 1937 – 20 January 2026) was a Syrian military officer and politician. He was the younger brother of Hafez al-Assad and the uncle of Bashar al-Assad, who served successively as President of Syria. He is most famous for being the commanding officer of the ground operations of the 1982 Hama massacre.

After launching a failed coup attempt against Hafez al-Assad in 1984, Rifaat lived in exile in Europe for 36 years and returned to Syria in October 2021 after being found guilty in France of acquiring millions of euros diverted from the Syrian state. In September 2022, France's highest court, the Cour de Cassation, confirmed the ruling.

In August 2023, Switzerland issued an international warrant for Rifaat's arrest after its Federal Criminal Court demanded his extradition to prosecute him for his role in supervising ground operations of the 1982 Hama massacre. The warrant was issued as part of the proceedings related to the war crimes complaint filed in 2013 by the human rights organization "TRIAL International" at the Office of the Attorney General of Switzerland (OAG). In March 2024, the OAG charged Rifaat with numerous crimes committed in the February 1982 Hama massacre.

== Early life and education ==
Rifaat al-Assad was born to an Alawite family in the village of Qardaha, near Lattakia in western Syria on 22 August 1937. He studied Political Science and Economics at Damascus University and was later given an honorary PhD in Politics from the Soviet Academy of Sciences.

== Early career ==
Rifaat joined the Syrian Arab Army in 1958 as a first lieutenant, and was rapidly promoted after training in various Soviet military academies (mainly in the Yekaterinburg Artillery school). In 1965, he became commander of a special security force loyal to the military wing of the Ba'ath and soon, supported Hafez al-Assad's overthrow of Salah Jadid and seizure of power in 1970. He was allowed to form his own paramilitary group, the Defense Companies, in 1971, which soon transformed into a powerful and regular military force trained and armed by the Soviet Union. He was a qualified paratrooper.

== Under Hafez's rule ==
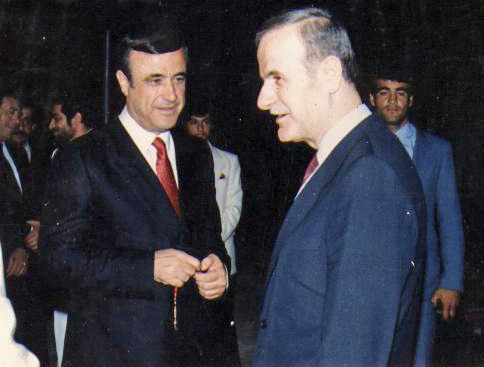
Rifaat with Hafez al-Assad, 1980

Rifaat played a key role in his brother's takeover of executive power in 1970, dubbed the Corrective Revolution, and ran the elite internal security forces and the Defense Companies (Arabic: سرايا الدفاع; Sarāyā ad-Difāʿ) in the 1970s and early 1980s. In addition to his military posture, Rifaat created the "League of Higher Graduates" (Arabic: رابطة الخريجين العليا, Rabitat al kharijin al-'ulia ), which provided discussion forums on public affairs for Syrian post-graduates, outside the constraints of the Ba'ath party. With more than fifteen branches across Syria, this cultural project gathered tens of thousands of members. He had a pivotal role throughout the 1970s and, until 1984, many saw him as the likely successor to his elder brother. Hafez Assad appointed him second vice president in March 1984.

In 1976, he visited Lebanon as a guest of Tony Frangiyeh since they had close and personal ties.

On 28 June 1979, fifteen men were hanged in Damascus. They had been convicted of attempting to assassinate Rifaat al-Assad.

=== Foreign relations ===
Numerous rumours tie Rifaat al-Assad to various foreign interests. Rifaat was close to King Abdullah of Saudi Arabia. Abdullah was married to a sister of Rifaat's wife, and Rifaat has on occasions—even after his public estrangement from the rulers in Syria—been invited to Saudi Arabia, with pictures of him and the royal family displayed in the state-controlled press.

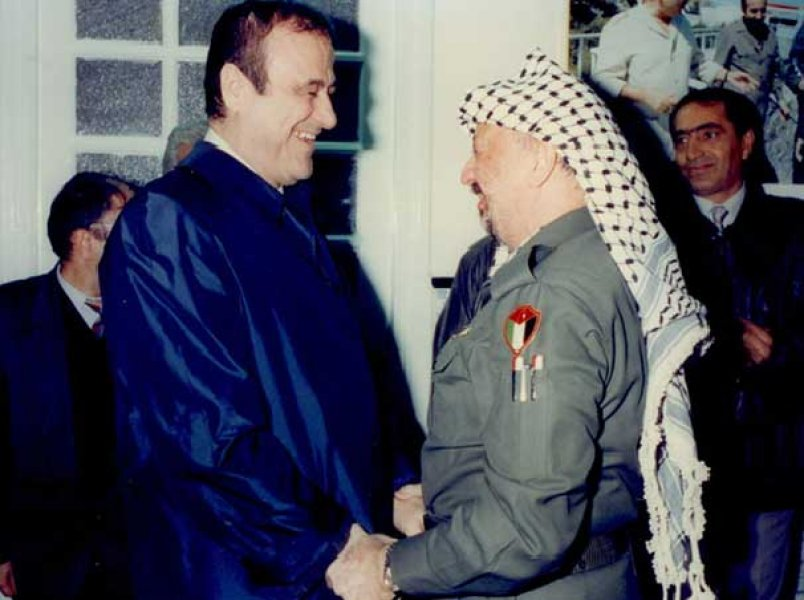
Rifaat meets with Yasser Arafat, 1983

In 1983, Rifaat met with PLO leader Yasser Arafat in an attempt to appease growing tensions between Syria and Arafat's loyalists.

Ion Mihai Pacepa, a general in the security forces of Communist Romania who defected to the U.S. in 1978, claimed that Rifaat al-Assad was recruited by Romanian intelligence during the Cold War. In Pacepa's 1996 novel Red Horizons, Romanian President Nicolae Ceaușescu is quoted as saying that Rifaat was "eating out of our hand" and went on to say: "Do I need a back channel for secret political communications? A way to inform Hafez secretly about my future discussions with Carter? Do I need to have somebody disappear in the West? Rifaat will take care of it. Now he can't do without my money." Pacepa later reasserted this allegation, describing Rifaat as "our well-paid agent" in a 2003 article in which he discussed the then Libyan leader Muammar Gaddafi.

Rifaat al-Assad contributed to the release of US politician and educator David S. Dodge on 21 July 1983. On 19 July 1982, Dodge was abducted by pro-Iranian militiamen, members of the Islamic Amal in Beirut, led by Hussein al-Musawi. He was first held in Lebanon and then kept captive in Iran until his release one year later. Through contacts in the Iranian regime of Khomeini, Rifaat was able to secure the release of Dodge and was publicly thanked by US president Ronald Reagan.

=== Hama massacre ===
In February 1982, as commander of the Defense Companies, he commanded the forces that put down a revolt in the city of Hama, by ordering his forces to shell the city with BM-21 Grad rockets, killing thousands of its inhabitants (reports of the total number of deaths range from between 10,000 and 40,000). This became known as the Hama Massacre. Due to his high-profile role in the military campaign that killed tens of thousands of civilians and destroyed most sections of Hama city, Rifaat acquired the nickname "Butcher of Hama". US journalist Thomas Friedman stated in his book From Beirut to Jerusalem that Rifaat later said that the total number of victims was 38,000.

Rifaat, however, has repeatedly denied playing any role in the Hama massacre. Rifaat al-Assad presented his version for the Hama massacre during the conference in Paris to form the Syrian National Democratic Council on 15 November 2011. He was also implicated in the 1980 Tadmor Prison massacre and acquired the sobriquet, the "butcher of Tadmor."

Rifaat al-Assad was also mentioned in a CIA report regarding drug smuggling activities in Syria during the 1980s, along with other Syrian officials such as Ali Haydar, Mustafa Tlass and Shafiq Fayadh.

== Attempted coup d'état ==
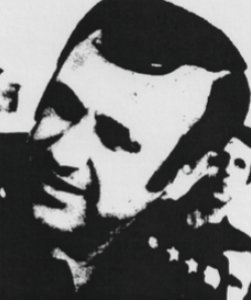
Rifaat's picture in CIA report, 1984

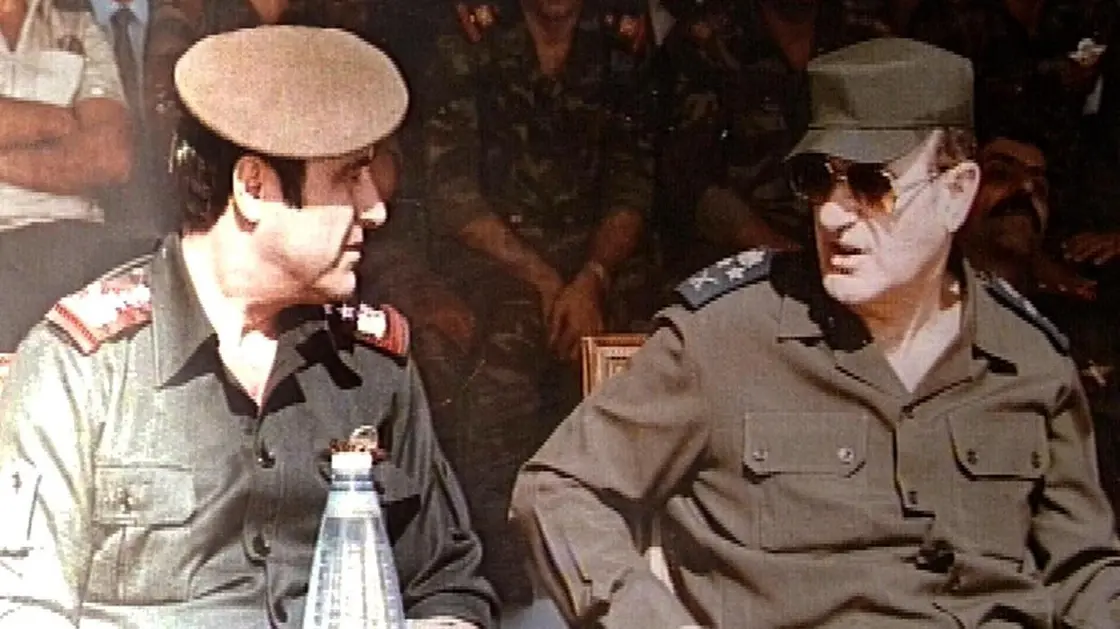
Rifaat (left) with Hafez Assad in 1984

When Hafez al-Assad suffered from heart problems in late 1983, he established a six-member committee to run the country composed of Abdul Halim Khaddam, Abdullah al-Ahmar, Mustafa Tlass, Mustafa al-Shihabi, Abdul Rauf al-Kasm and Zuhair Masharqa. Rifaat was not included, and the council consisted entirely of close Sunni Muslim loyalists to Hafez, who were mostly lightweights in the military-security establishment. This caused unease in the Alawi-dominated officer corps, and several high-ranking officers began rallying around Rifaat, while others remained loyal to Hafez's instructions.

In March 1984, Rifaat's troops, now numbering more than 55,000 with tanks, artillery, aircraft and helicopters, began asserting control over Damascus. A squadron of Rifaat's T-72 tanks took position at the central roundabout of Kafr Sousa and in Mount Qasioun, overlooking the city. Rifaat's forces set up checkpoints and roadblocks, put up posters of him in state buildings, disarmed regular troops and arbitrarily arrested soldiers of the regular Army, occupied and commandeered police stations, intelligence buildings, and state buildings; the Defense Companies rapidly outnumbered and took control over both the Special Forces and the Republican Guard. Although Damascus was divided between two armies and seemed on the brink of war, Rifaat did not move. Informed that Rifaat was heading to Damascus, his brother Hafez al-Assad left his headquarters to meet him.

British journalist Patrick Seale reports an intimate moment between the two brothers :

At Rifat's home in Mezze the brothers were at last face to face. 'You want to overthrow the regime?' Asad asked. 'Here I am. I am the regime.' For an hour they stormed at each other but, in his role of elder brother and with his mother in the house, Asad could not fail to win the contest. Deferring to him at last, as he had so often done in their youths, Rifat chose to accept (although with some inward scepticism) Asad's pledge that trust between them would be restored and would be the basis for their future work together.

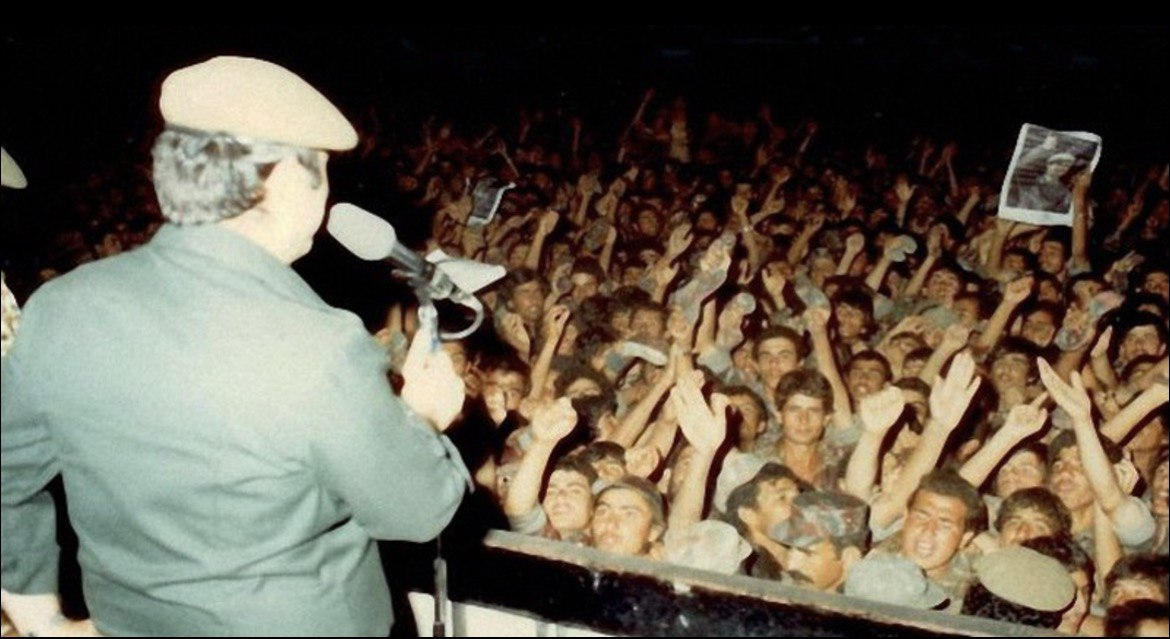
Rifaat with crowd of paratroopers from "Defense Companies", 1982

There was a clear division and tensions between forces loyal to Hafez, namely the 3rd Armoured Division (commanded by General Shafiq Fayadh), the Republican Guard (commanded by General Adnan Makhlouf), the various Intelligence services (commanded by Generals Mohamed Khouli and Ali Duba), the National Police, and the Special Forces (commanded by General Ali Haidar); and the Defense Companies loyal to Rifaat. By the middle of 1984 Hafez had returned from his sick bed and assumed full control, at which point most officers rallied around him. Initially, it seemed that Rifaat was going to be put on trial and even faced a questioning that was broadcast on television. However, it is believed that Hafez's daughter Bushra actually saved her uncle by convincing her father that purging him would disgrace the family and might cause tensions not only in the Assad family, but with the Makhlouf family as well (since Rifaat was also married to a woman from that family, who are also the second most prevalent Alawite family, dominating the leadership of the security services behind the Assads).

In what at first seemed a compromise, Rifaat was made vice-president with responsibility for security affairs, but this proved a wholly nominal post. Command of the 'Defense Companies', which was trimmed down to an Armoured Division size, was transferred to another officer, and ultimately the entire unit was disbanded and absorbed into other units, like the 4th Mechanized Division, the Republican Guard, and the Airborne Special Forces Division. Rifaat was then sent to the Soviet Union on "an open-ended working visit". His closest supporters and others who had failed to prove their loyalty to Hafez were purged from the army and Ba'ath Party in the years that followed. Upon his departure, Rifaat acquired $US300 million of public money including a $US100 million Libyan loan. In 2015, he claimed that the money had been a gift from Crown Prince Abdullah of Saudi Arabia.

== Exile in Europe ==
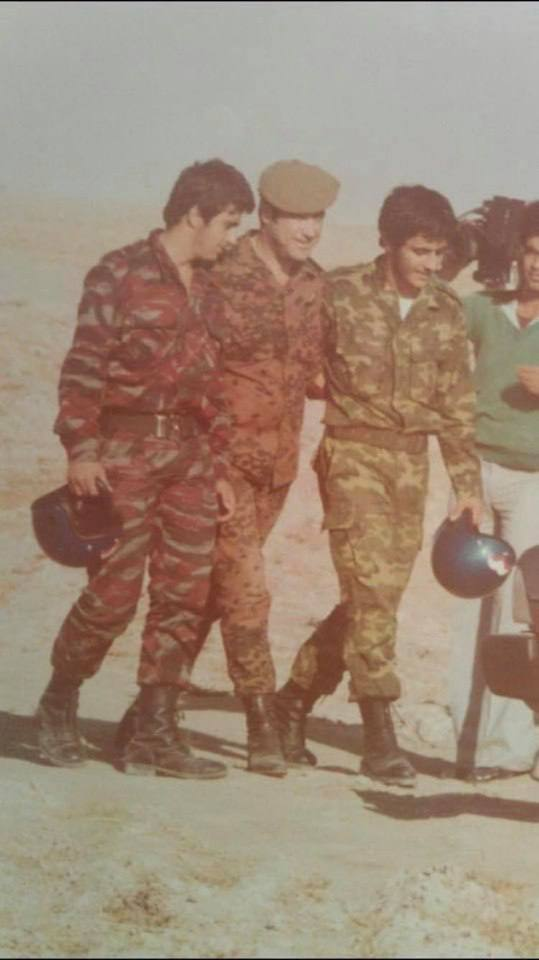
Rifaat with paratroopers during drills in 1982

After Hafez exiled his brother following his abortive coup attempt in 1984, Rifaat lived in Europe for the next 40 years. Hafez allowed Rifaat to briefly return to Syria to attend his mother's funeral in 1992 but he was thereafter forced to return to Europe. He lived lavishly in exile, and secretly used an adviser in Guernsey to manage his vast wealth.

In the 2010s, Rifaat owned a large property on the Costa del Sol, in Marbella, Spain; a £10 million townhouse in Mayfair, London; and a mansion in Avenue Foch in Paris, France. Like other members of Assad family, he maintained a network of properties in Europe, which in 2011 he was reportedly attempting to sell off in anticipation of asset freezing due to international sanctions against Syria.

After the death of Hafez's eldest son Bassel al-Assad in an auto crash in 1994, Rifaat sought to position himself as Hafez's successor, and returned to Syria again; however, Hafez named a younger son, Bashar al-Assad, instead, and maneuvered to eliminate all potential competition for Bashar's succession. Unhappy at being passed over, Rifaat returned to exile, where he established a London-based satellite television in 1997. The station, the Arab News Network, was run by Rifaat's son Somar and was not commercially successful. Rifaat created a political party, also led by his son Somar, that criticized Hafez's regime and had contacts with various Syrian opposition figures. Rifaat nominally retained the post of vice president (one of three people to hold the title) until 8 February 1998, when he was stripped of this title. In 1999, Rifaat's supporters engaged in armed clashes with government forces in Latakia, leading to a crackdown that destroyed much of Rifaat's remaining network in Syria.

After Hafez's death in June 2000, Rifaat again unsuccessfully made a bid for power, with his spokesman asserting that he was "ready to take up his responsibilities at any moment" and was the legitimate heir to the presidency. However, the leading forces in the ruling Ba'ath party, security forces, and military remained loyal to Bashar, and Rifaat was blocked from attending Hafez's funeral. Vice-President Abdul Halim Khaddam, the interim leader until Bashar's formal succession, ordered Rifaat's arrest if he attempted to return to Syria or Lebanon. By the time of the outbreak of the Syrian civil war in 2011, Rifaat and Sumer had already spent years in exile and were considered to have little influence on Syrian politics, beyond being an occasionally disruptive force. In November 2011, nine months into an uprising against Bashar's regime, Rifaat launched a new Paris-based opposition group, the Syrian National Democratic Council; Rifaat claimed that the group had popular support in Syria, including among some army defectors, but these assertions were not considered credible.

After the Iraq War, there were press reports that he had started talks with US government representatives on helping to form a coalition with other anti-Assad groups to provide an alternative Syrian leadership, on the model of the Iraqi National Congress. Rifaat has held a meeting with the former Iraqi Prime Minister Ayad Allawi. Yossef Bodansky, the director of the US Congressional Task Force on Terrorism and Unconventional Warfare, has stated that Rifaat enjoyed support from both the United States and Saudi Arabia; he has been featured in the Saudi press as visiting the royal family in 2007. The Bashar government remained wary of his intentions and carefully monitored his activities.

Rifaat was mentioned by the influential American think tank Stratfor as a possible suspect for the 2005 bombing that killed Lebanese ex-prime minister Rafiq Hariri and the string of attacks that struck Beirut after the subsequent Syrian withdrawal. The goal would have been to destabilize the Syrian government. However, there has been no mention of Rifaat in the United Nations Mehlis reports on the crime.

Rifaat founded the Arab Democratic Party in Lebanon in the early 1970s, a small Alawite sectarian/political group in Lebanon, which during the Lebanese Civil War acted as an armed militia loyal to the Syrian government (through Rifaat).

== Distinctions ==
Ribbon	Distinction	Country	Date	Location	Notes	Reference
	Order of Military Merit (Commander)	Morocco	1974	Rabat	Sharifian (Royal) Order of Military Merit in Morocco. Awarded by King Hassan II	
	Grand Cross of the National Order of the Legion of Honour	France	1986	Paris	Highest rank in the Order of the Legion of Honor in the Republic of France. Awarded by former president François Mitterrand	

== Criminal proceedings in Europe and return to Syria ==
=== In Switzerland ===
In December 2013, human rights organization "Trial International" filed criminal proceedings against Rifaat al-Assad. As commander of Defense Brigades that took part in the Hama Massacre, Rifaat was charged with organizing extrajudicial killings, large-scale torture, sexual violence, mass-rapes, summary executions and forced disappearances. An inquiry was launched by the Office of the Attorney General of Switzerland (OAG) that month. In 2021, the Federal Office of Justice rejected the OAJ's request to issue an arrest warrant against Rifaat, on the ground that he was neither a Swiss national or resident. However, in 2022, the Federal Criminal Court ordered the office to issue the warrant, ruling that Rifaat's presence at a Geneva hotel in 2013, when the investigation was opened, was a sufficient nexus for Swiss authorities to prosecute them. The court's ruling was published the next year, but because Rifaat had fled to Syria in 2021, it was considered unlikely that the arrest warrant would be implemented. In December 2024, the Federal Criminal Court confirmed that it was considering closing the case against Rifaat due to his poor health.

=== In Spain and France ===
Since 2014, Rifaat was accused of money laundering and aggravated tax fraud by French prosecutors. In addition, Spanish authorities have seized his assets and bank accounts in a money laundering investigation since 2017.

In June 2020, a Paris court sentenced Rifaat to four years in prison upon his conviction of money laundering and aggravated tax fraud by embezzling state funds from Syria and using them to build a property empire in Europe. The trial was held in absentia due to Rifaat's advanced age and poor health. (He was hospitalized in France in December 2019 with internal bleeding.) Rifaat did not serve any of his jail sentence in France. However, his properties in Paris and London were ordered to be seized. In September 2022, France's highest court, the Cour de Cassation, upheld the sentence.

=== Return to Damascus ===
In October 2021, Rifaat returned to Syria at the age of 84. President Bashar al-Assad allowed his uncle to return to the country after decades in exile in order "to avoid imprisonment in France". He returned to his former home in the Western Villas neighborhood of Mezzeh in Damascus.

== Second exile ==
During the fall of the Assad regime in December 2024, Rifaat fled to Lebanon before moving to Dubai, United Arab Emirates, on 26 December. The next day, his daughter-in-law Rasha Khazem, the wife of his son Duraid Assad, was arrested along with her daughter Shams in Lebanon while they were attempting to fly out to Egypt.

== Personal life and death ==
Rifaat married four times and his polygamous marriages as well as the marriages of his children have produced strong alliances and ties with prominent families and prestigious clans within Syria and the Arab world. He firstly married one of his cousins, Amirah, from al-Qurdahah. Then, he married Salma Makhlouf, a cousin of Hafez Assad's wife, Anisa. His third spouse is a young woman from the traditional Sunni Muslim establishment, Rajaa Bakrat. His fourth wife, Lina al-Khayyir, is from one of the most prominent Alawite families in Syria. The sister of one of his spouses was married to King Abdullah of Saudi Arabia.

Rifaat's daughter Tumadir married Muin Nassif Kheir Beik, a member of the most powerful and prestigious Alawite family. His son-in-law is a relative of the Syrian activist and poet Kamal Kheir Beik. Tamadhin, another daughter, married a Makhlouf. Lama married Ala Fayyad, the son of Alawite General Shafiq Fayadh. Rifaat's eldest son, Mudar, married Maya Haydar, the daughter of the ultra-rich entrepreneur Muhammad Haydar from the prominent al-Haddadin Alawite tribe. His youngest son, Ribal al-Assad, born 1975, is a businessman and political activist. He resided in Paris and has spoken frequently on French and international media on the Syrian crisis.

Rifaat died from complications of influenza in Dubai, on 20 January 2026, at the age of 88.

Following his death, French President Emmanuel Macron announced in July 2026 that France would return more than €50 million in frozen assets confiscated from Rifaat al-Assad's illicit gains to Syria for development projects, under a declaration of intent signed by French and Syrian officials.

== See also ==
- Al-Assad family
- Presidency of Hafez al-Assad

== Bibliography ==
- Thomas L. Friedman (2012). "4. Hama Rules". From Beirut to Jerusalem (Revised ed.). Picador. ISBN 978-1250015495.

Political offices
Preceded by (No Vice Presidents appointed)	Vice President of Syria; 1984–1998	Succeeded by —
