= 1980 Tadmor prison massacre =

Massacre in Tadmor prison in Syria

- Part of Islamist uprising in Syria
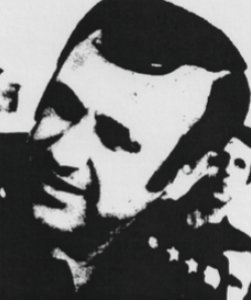
- Image of Rifaat al-Assad, who led the massacre, from a CIA report
- Location: 34°33′32.00″N 38°17′7.01″E; Tadmor Prison, Palmyra, Syria
- Date: June 27, 1980
- Target: Prisoners associated with Muslim Brotherhood
- Attack type: Massacre
- Deaths: 500-1100 prisoners, 1 soldier
- Injuries: 2 soldiers
- Perpetrators: Defense Companies; 40th Army Corps; 138th Security Brigade
- Motive: Revenge for the assassination attempt on President Hafez al-Assad

On June 27, 1980, a massacre was committed on the prisoners of the Tadmor Prison by the Syrian Defense Companies in revenge for an assassination attempt on Syrian President Hafez al-Assad, which took place the previous day. After the assassination attempt, on orders from the president's brother, Rifaat al-Assad, fighters from the Defense Companies militia flew into the prison in helicopters and began indiscriminately killing prisoners, ultimately killing an estimated 1,000 people.

== Background ==
=== Tadmor prison ===
The buildings were first used as a prison for political prisoners in 1966. When Hafez al-Assad came to power in 1970, the prison was greatly expanded. As a result, it gained a reputation as one of the most brutal and deplorable prisons on the planet, repeatedly causing outrage from media and law enforcement organizations, such as Human Rights Watch or Amnesty International.

=== Islamist uprising ===
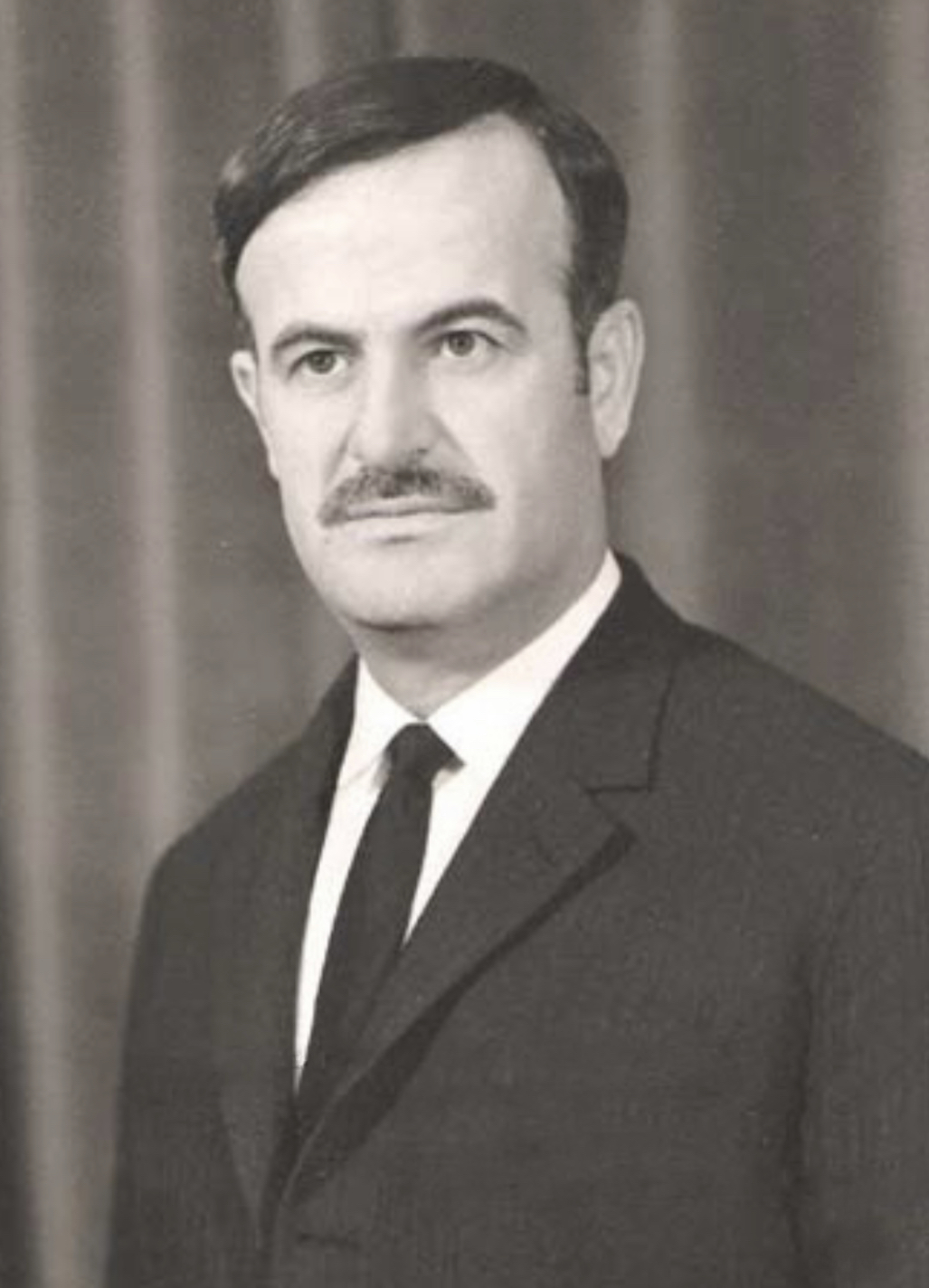
Official portrait of Hafez al-Assad, president of Syria (1971-2000)

Beginning in 1976, Syria was in the grip of the so-called "Islamist uprising" against the neo-Ba'athist regime of president Hafez al-Assad, with the Muslim Brotherhood and the Fighting Vanguard carrying out attacks on targets associated with the government and security forces. In 1979, militants massacred Syrian cadets at an artillery school in Aleppo, marking the end of sporadic attacks in favor of a full-fledged campaign of urban warfare against the government. The government's response to the massacre was aggressive, resulting in increased repression. Gradually, the situation escalated; the president's brother, Rifaat al-Assad, told the Ba'ath Party's regional congress in January 1980:

"Stalin sacrificed ten million to preserve the Bolshevik Revolution and Syria should be prepared to do the same... I am personally willing to fight a hundred years, demolish a million strongholds, and sacrifice a million martyrs [to end Muslim Brotherhood]".

In addition to this statement, Rifaat, standing on a tank in March 1980, said that he was ready to "kill a thousand people a day to cleanse the country of the Muslim Brotherhood."

Earlier in 1980, prisoners in Tadmor began rioting, demanding better living conditions in the prison. Security forces responded by killing more than a hundred of them, whose bodies were dumped in mass graves.

=== Attempted assassination of Hafez al-Assad ===
On 26 June 1980, Hafez al-Assad himself narrowly escaped death after a failed assassination attempt. The assailant fired a burst of rounds and threw two grenades, the first being kicked away by Assad and the second being covered by his personal bodyguard, Khalid al-Husayn, who died instantly. It was carried out by Muslim Brotherhood supporters. The very next day the government carried out its revenge.

== Massacre ==
On the morning of June 27, 22 helicopters took off from Homs and Damascus towards Palmyra. On board were a total of 350 commandos of the "Defense Companies", 100 soldiers of the 40th Army Corps and 100 members of the 138th Security Brigade (a total of up to 550 people). At 6.30 am the helicopters arrived at their destination - 470 soldiers remained on site to guard the helicopters, while 80 began to move into the prison. They were divided into groups of 10 and were given orders to kill all prisoners who might be associated with the Muslim Brotherhood. In essence, they could kill anyone - and they did. Prisoners were executed right in their cells, without any interrogation, simply on the grounds of suspicion of connections with the Muslim Brotherhood: they were shot at indiscriminately with machine guns and pelted with grenades. The massacre continued for several hours or less than an hour, with special forces soldier Isa Ibrahim Fayad, who partook in the massacre, describing the events as such:

“The guards opened the doors for us. Six or seven of us went in and killed everyone in there, about 60 or 70 people. I shot about 15 people myself. In the neighboring blocks, you could also hear machine gun fire and the cries of the dying: “Allahu Akbar!” ... We killed almost 550 of these Muslim Brotherhood bastards."

The massacre resulted in the killing of an estimated 500-600 to 1,000-1,100 people (almost all prisoners). Some prisoners tried to resist: for this reason 1 soldier was killed and 2 more were wounded. After the massacre, it took two weeks to clear the prison of blood and corpses. The massacre was carried out in strict secrecy - the outside world only learned about it eight months later, when Syrian intelligence agents captured in Jordan exposed it and provided details.

== Aftermath ==
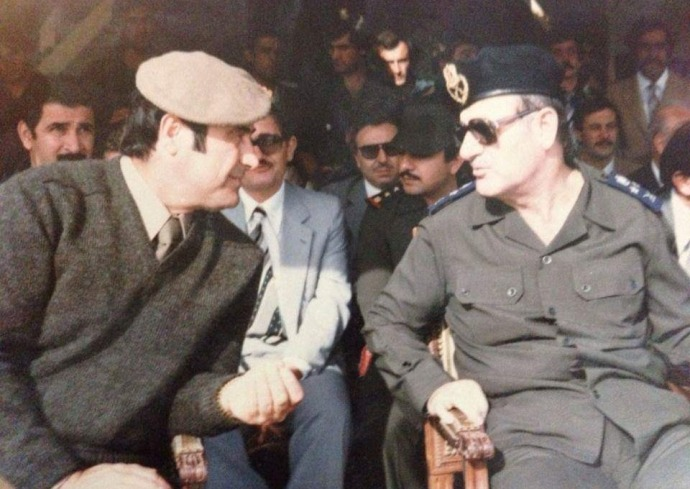
Hafez and Rifaat al-Assad, 1982

The massacre marked another escalation in government repression. At July 7, the government issued Law No. 49, which declared membership in the Muslim Brotherhood or the Fighting Vanguard a capital crime punishable by death. The burial site of those executed was never revealed, and the government released no information about the dead. In October 1981, Hafez al-Assad said: "We must completely eliminate any trace of this gang by effective revolutionary means, no matter how long it takes us".

The massacre is well known throughout Syria. Syrian poet Faraj Bayrakdar, who was a political prisoner for many years, called Tadmor Prison a "kingdom of death and madness". The massacre and the prison in general have occupied a special place in Syrian literature written by opposition figures and even former political prisoners, and have become the subject of books, poems, novels and documentaries.

== See also ==
- Presidency of Hafez al-Assad
- Ba'athist Syria
- Human rights in Ba'athist Syria
- Terrorism in Ba'athist Syria
