= Ribal al-Assad =

Syrian businessman and political activist

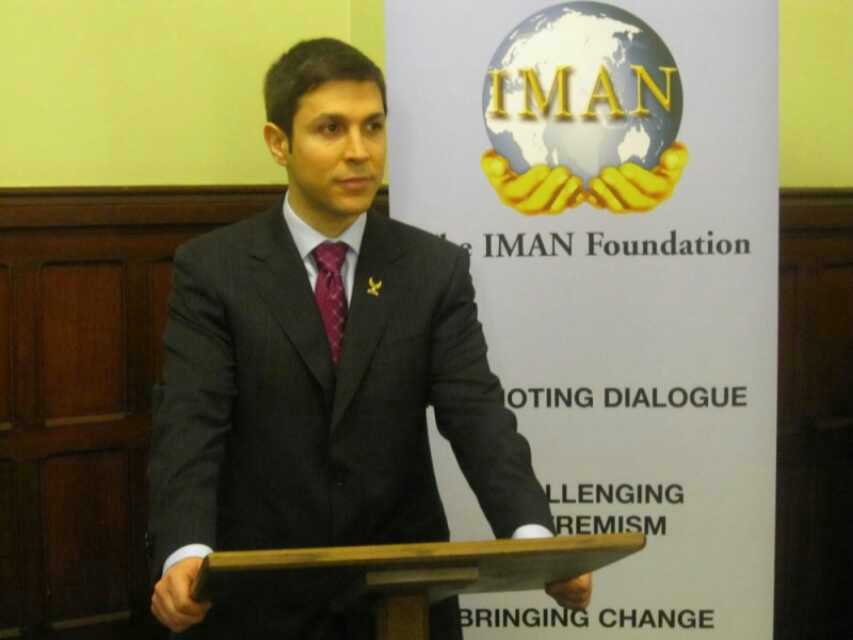
Ribal Al-Assad launches the Iman Foundation in the British Parliament, on 16 March 2011

Ribal al-Assad (Arabic: ريبال الأسد; born 4 June 1975) is a Syrian businessman and political activist. He is the founder and director of the Organisation for Freedom and Democracy in Syria (ODFS) and the chairman and founder of the Iman Foundation.

== Early life and family ==
Ribal al-Assad was born in Damascus, the 13th of 16 siblings. He is the son of Rifaat al-Assad and his third wife Line Al-Khayer, sister-in-law of the late Saudi king Abdullah bin Abdulaziz, and is thus a member of the Assad family. His father, Rifaat al-Assad, a younger brother of President Hafez al-Assad, was a security chief and commander of the Defense Companies, who was responsible for the 1982 Hama massacre. After attempting a coup d'état, he and his family went into exile in France, then the UK. Ribal, at the age of 9, and his family then moved to Paris, where he continued to live until the age of 16. At the age of 16, al-Assad moved to the United States and began high school in New York and Houston, before attending university in Boston. He holds a Bachelor of Business Administration degree from the InterAmerican University, New York, US and an MA from the University of Leicester, United Kingdom.

== Political activism ==
In 2006, al-Assad became director of the London Bureau of the Arab News Network (ANN), a family owned television channel founded in 1997. After he left ANN, he founded the Organisation for Democracy and Freedom in Syria (ODFS) in 2009 and became its director. The organization did not gain prominence until 2010, when Robert Fisk of The Independent interviewed Ribal al-Assad. Of his cousin, Bashar al-Assad, Ribal said: "He is still governing under the ghost of his father. Each person in Syria has an interest in the secret service. Bashar should have declared national unity as soon as he took over. He did things bit by bit, with internet cafes and so on. But it was not enough. There was no real change."

Al-Assad also appears from time to time on TV and in the print media as a commentator on politics and current events.

Ribal has been critical of the Syrian National Council since its inception. He said it has been overwhelmingly made up of members of the Muslim Brotherhood, who were not elected through a democratic process but hand-picked by Turkey and Qatar. He has also been critical of the Free Syria Army (saying it was made of Islamist extremist groups) and its Supreme Military Council (saying it was exclusively made up of Salafi extremist groups).

After the fall of the Assad regime in 2024, al-Assad voiced skepticism regarding the takeover by Syrian rebels.

Ribal al-Assad’s work as Chairman of the Iman Foundation has focused on promoting interfaith and inter cultural dialogue and challenging extremism across the world. The organisation is not-for-profit and is committed to "promoting inter-religious and inter-cultural dialogue, intra-religious dialogue and challenging extremism and promoting mainstream voices".
