= Attempted assassination of Hafez al-Assad =

- Part of Islamist uprising in Syria
- Location of the assassination attempt.
- Location: Guest Palace, Damascus, Syria
- Date: 26 June 1980 (Local time)
- Target: Hafez al-Assad
- Attack type: Assassination attempt
- Weapons: Hand grenades, machine gun
- Deaths: 3 (including 2 perpetrators)
- Injuries: 1 (Hafez al-Assad)
- Perpetrator: Muslim Brotherhood

On 26 June 1980, an assassination attempt on Hafez al-Assad, the Syrian president, was carried out by Muslim Brotherhood supporters who threw two grenades and fired machine gun bursts at him as he waited for the president of Mali in the Guest Palace in Damascus. Assad kicked one grenade out of range, while one of his bodyguards threw himself on the other grenade.

The attack came in the context of the Islamist uprising in Syria. The attack on the president prompted a series of deadly retaliation by the government troops, most notably the Tadmor prison massacre, carried out the next day. Ten days later Law No. 49 was passed, making membership of the Muslim Brotherhood a capital offense.

== See also ==
- 1986 Damascus bombings
- 1982 Hama massacre
