= Arab News Network =

Arabic-language television channel

- Broadcast area: Worldwide
- Headquarters: North Acton, London, UK

Programming
- Language: Arabic

Ownership
- Owner: Siwar al Assad (director)
- Key people: Siwar Al Assad

History
- Launched: 1997 (29 years ago)

Links
- Website: anntv.co.uk

Arab News Network (ANN) was an Arab news channel broadcast on satellite from London.

== History and profile ==
ANN was established in 1997. The channel is currently owned by Siwar al Assad, a first cousin of the President of Syria, Bashar al-Assad. The channel states its goal to be democratic reform.

The station broadcast daily English news from November 2004 to March 2006, but since then had been broadcasting solely in Arabic until 2014. The desire to remove the programme reflected a change in management. Ribal al-Assad, took over as director of the London Bureau from 2006 to 2010. He decided to cancel the English programming due to what he perceived to be the lack of an audience for it. However, since the latest change of management in 2010, the new proprietor, Siwar al Assad, has decided to reintroduce English Language programming alongside the Arabic. In 2014 Siwar launched a program modeled on the BBC's Hardtalk called The English Hour which is recorded in London broadcast at peak time and subtitled in Arabic.

The channel has faced some financial issues. Major restructuring has been undertaken and technological updates have been acquired by the channel in order to improve its image.

ANN formerly broadcast on Hotbird and Arabsat but now broadcasts on Nilesat.
