= 1999 Latakia protests =

Violent protests and armed clashes

- Date: October 1999
- Location: Latakia, Latakia Governorate, Syria
- Caused by: Closure of economic interests owned by Rifaat al-Assad
- Result: Syrian government victory: Destruction of Rifaat's remaining business interests in Syria; Succession of Presidency secured for Bashar al-Assad

Parties
(Ba'athist Syria) Syrian Government; Syrian Police	(Ba'athist Syria) Rifaat supporters Supported by: Saudi Arabia (alleged)

Lead figures
(Ba'athist Syria) Hafez al-Assad	(Ba'athist Syria) Rifaat al-Assad

Casualties
- Deaths: 2 (official figure); Hundreds (opposition figure)
- Injuries: Hundreds (opposition figure)
- Arrested: ~1,000 protesters

The 1999 Latakia protests (or 1999 Latakia incident) were violent protests and armed clashes, which erupted in Latakia, Syria following the 1998 People's Assembly's elections. The violent events were an explosion of a long-running feud between Hafez al-Assad and his younger brother Rifaat. Two people were killed in fire exchanges between Syrian police and Rifaat's supporters during a police crack-down on Rifaat's port compound in Latakia. According to opposition sources, which were denied by the government, the protests left hundreds dead or injured.

== Background ==
=== Attempted 1984 coup d'etat ===
When Hafez al-Assad suffered from heart problems in 1983, he established a six-member committee to run the country. Rifaat was not included, whereas the council consisted entirely of Sunni Muslim loyalists close to Hafez. This caused unease in the Alawi-dominated officer corps, and several high-ranking officers began rallying around Rifaat, while others remained loyal to Hafez's instructions. Rifaat's troops, then numbering more than 55,000 with tanks, artillery, aircraft and helicopters, began asserting control over Damascus, with a clear attempt to succeed his brother. Tensions between forces loyal to Hafez and those loyal to Rifaat were extreme, but by early 1984, Hafez had recovered and assumed full control, at which point most officers rallied around him. In what at first seemed a compromise, Rifaat was made vice-president with responsibility for security affairs, but this proved a wholly nominal post. Rifaat was then sent abroad on "an open-ended working visit." Both his closest supporters and others who had failed to prove their loyalty to Hafez were purged from the army and Ba'ath Party in the years that followed. Rifaat was, thereafter, confined to exile in France and Spain. He nominally retained the post of vice president until 1998, when he was stripped even of the title. He had retained a large business empire both in Syria and abroad, partly through his son Sumer.

=== 1998 People's Assembly elections ===
Elections to the People's Assembly in Syria were held on 30 November and 1 December 1998, at which the NPF, led by the ruling Ba'ath party, won the majority of seats. On 11 February 1999, a national referendum verified the Assembly's decision to nominate President Assad for a fifth term in office. It was also speculated that Bashar al-Assad to be promoted to vice-presidency, after already acquiring colonel army rank in January that year. In June, Syrian authorities undertook a campaign led by Bashar to counter corruption in public office, which resulted in the detention of several officials and businessmen. In October, after a nine-month trial, former Syrian intelligence service director got a lengthy prison sentence for alleged corruption and embezzlement of public funds.

== Protests ==
In September, security forces arrested around 1,000 people in Damascus and Latakia, targeting supporters and relatives of Rifaat al-Assad. In October, the subsequent closure of Rifaat's businesses provoked several days of violent clashes between Rifaat's supporters and security forces. The official version was that Rifaat had ignored a series of decrees from the Syrian Transport Ministry, ordering a demolition of his 'jetty' and an accompanying complex that had been established on 11,410 sq. meters of public land.

When the police were sent to enforce the closure of the compound, they encountered small-arms fire and retreated. The security forces then attacked and occupied the port, resulting in two people killed. Opposition reports of those events, rejected by the Syrian Government, indicated that hundreds of people were killed of injured.

After the events, the Information Minister, Muhammad Salman, warned that if Rifaat returns to Syria he would face criminal charges. It was never explained why Rifaat's 'illegal' port had been tolerated for four years (1995–1999), before the crack-down. The 1999 crackdown in Lattakia destroyed much of Rifaat's remaining business network in Syria; large numbers of Rifaat's supporters were arrested. This was seen as tied to the issue of succession, with Rifaat having begun to position himself to succeed the ailing Hafez, who in his turn sought to eliminate all potential competition for his designated successor, his son Bashar al-Assad.

== Rifaat's reaction to Bashar's presidency succession ==
In France, Rifaat loudly protested the succession of Bashar al-Assad to the post of president, claiming that he alone embodied the "only constitutional legality" (as vice president, alleging his dismissal was unconstitutional). He made threatening remarks about planning to return to Syria at a time of his choosing to assume "his responsibilities and fulfill the will of the people." He also claimed that he would rule benevolently and democratically, with "the power of the people and the army" behind him.

== See also ==
- Human rights in Syria
- 1982 Hama massacre
- Syrian Civil War
- List of modern conflicts in the Middle East
