= List of members of the National Revolutionary Council, 1965 =

This is a list of members elected to the National Revolutionary Council elected by the Regional Command of the Ba'ath Party and appointed by President Amin al-Hafiz in 1965.

== Members ==
No.	Name	Party
1	Muhammad Amin al-Hafiz	Ba'ath Party
2	Michel Aflaq	Ba'ath Party
3	Hafez al-Assad	Ba'ath Party
4	Shibli al-Aysami	Ba'ath Party
5	Ibrahim Makhous	Ba'ath Party
6	Mansur al-Atrash	Ba'ath Party
7	Salah Jadid	Ba'ath Party
8	Nur al-Din al-Atassi	Ba'ath Party
9	Yusuf Zuayyin	Ba'ath Party
10	Jamil Shaya	Ba'ath Party
11	Mahmoud al-Zoubi	Ba'ath Party
12	Mustafa Rustum	Ba'ath Party
13	Salah ad-Din al-Bitar	Ba'ath Party
14	Ghassan Haddad	Ba'ath Party
15	Fahd al-Shaer	
16	Musa al-Zoubi	
17	Hamad Ubayd	Ba'ath Party
18	Marwan Habash	Ba'ath Party
19	Salim Hatum	Ba'ath Party
20	Fayez al-Jasim	
21	Hussam Haiza	
22	Muhammad Riyah al-Tawil	
23	Abdul-Karim al-Jundi	Ba'ath Party
24	Mustafa Tlass	Ba'ath Party
25	Muhammad Eid Ashawi	Ba'ath Party
26	Hussein Malham	
27	Mustafa al-Hajj Ali	
28	Osman Kanaan	
29	Ahmad al-Amir	
30	Ahmad Suwaydan	
31	Khalid al-Jundi	
32	Jamil Thabit	
33	Nour al-Din al-Dardari	
34	Muhammad Asaad al-Hamad	
35	Muhammad al-Sousi	
36	Ibrahim Nuweidar	
37	Hassan Sasila	
38	Muhammad Khalil Jawish	
39	Abd al-Rahman Abaji	
40	Anwar Ajaj Iqra‘i	
41	Ali Shihab al-Darwish	
42	Hussein Ali Rizq	
43	Fayyad Mustafa	
44	Najib Hilal	
45	Ahmad Hamdouni	
46	Ibrahim Shahada	
47	Yusuf Abdullah Haddad	
48	Nayef Hajar	
49	Diaa al-Hajj Ali	
50	Mahmoud Abd al-Qadir	
51	Yahya Nasif	
52	Ali al-Ghadban	
53	Aziz Shurayqa	
54	Atiyya Hannoush	
55	Faisal Najras	
56	Suleiman Khuli	
57	Ahmad Shalout	
58	Wasima Safarjalani	
59	Suad Abdullah	
60	Aisha al-Dabbagh	Ba'ath Party
61	Hayat al-Dawalibi	
62	Furat Tleimat	
63	Shukriya Abd al-Ghani	
64	Nabila Razzaz	
65	Fernand Bali	
66	Sabah al-Rikabi	
67	Muhammad Wiss	
68	Kamal Shahada	
69	Salah Omar Pasha	
70	Michel Mansour	
71	Sharif al-Nabulsi	
72	Khairi Shalati	
73	Abdullah al-Banshi	
74	Suleiman al-Khash	Ba'ath Party
75	Muzhir al-Anbari	
76	Abd al-Rahman al-Kawakibi	
77	Adel Tarbin	
78	Hussein Mihanna	
79	Saleh Mahamid	
80	Samih Fakhouri	
81	Mamdouh Jaber	Ba'ath Party
82	Abd al-Fattah al-Boushi	Ba'ath Party
83	Hassan Marioud	Ba'ath Party
84	Najah Saati	
85	Samih Atiya	
86	George Shahrastan	
87	Mustafa al-Shammaa	
88	Mahmoud Arab Said	
89	Ahmad al-Khatib	Ba'ath Party
90	Faez al-Nasser	
91	Kamal Shawqi	
92	Abd al-Rahim Allaf	
93	Shawqi Sibai	
94	Khaled al-Ali	
95	Abd al-Ilah Assi	
