= Mansur al-Atrash =

Syrian politician

Mansur al-Atrash منصور الأطرش
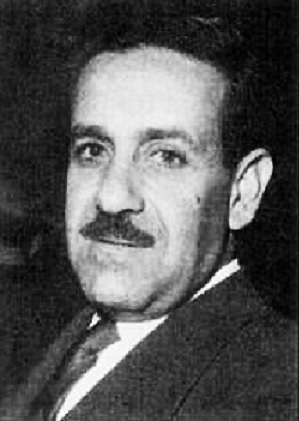
- Portrait of Mansur al-Atrash, 1963–1966

Chairman of the National Revolutionary Council
- In office 1 September 1965 – 21 February 1966
- Preceded by: Said al-Ghazzi
- Succeeded by: Ahmad al-Khatib

Minister of Labor and Social Affairs
- In office 4 August 1963 – 13 May 1964
- Preceded by: Muhammad Abdin
- Succeeded by: Ali Taljabini

Member of the National Command of the Arab Socialist Ba'ath Party
- In office 18 February 1964 – 23 February 1966

Personal details
- Born: 3 February 1925 al-Qurayya, Jabal al-Druze State, French Mandate of Syria
- Died: 14 November 2006 (aged 81) Ba'athist Syria
- Party: Syrian Regional Branch of the Arab Socialist Ba'ath Party (until 1966)
- Parent: Sultan al-Atrash (father)
- Education: American University of Beirut; University of Paris

Mansur al-Atrash (Arabic: منصور الأطرش; 3 February 1925 – 14 November 2006) was a Syrian politician and journalist. Together with fellow university students, Atrash became a founding member of the Ba'ath Party and its Syrian regional branch in 1947. During the presidency of Adib Shishakli (1951–54), he became an anti-government activist and was imprisoned twice, only to be released in an unsuccessful attempt by Shishakli to gain the support of Atrash's father, Sultan. In the year Shishakli was overthrown, Atrash was elected to parliament and turned down an offer to serve in Said al-Ghazzi's government. During the period of the United Arab Republic (1958–61), Atrash became a strong supporter of Egyptian president and pan-Arab leader Gamal Abdel Nasser. He opposed Syria's secession from the UAR and turned down offers to serve in successive separatist governments in protest.

When the Ba'ath Party gained power in the 1963 coup, Atrash became Minister of Social Affairs and in 1965 the head of the Revolutionary Command Council (RCC). A second coup by left-wing Ba'athist officers resulted in a split within the party between the coup officers led by the Military Committee and the founders led by Michel Aflaq, with Atrash being an ardent supporter of the latter. He was subsequently imprisoned, but released in the aftermath of Syria's defeat in the 1967 War with Israel. After two years of self-imposed exile in Lebanon, he returned to Syria where he mostly abandoned political life. He died on 14 November 2006 and was buried near his hometown of al-Qurayya.

== Early life ==
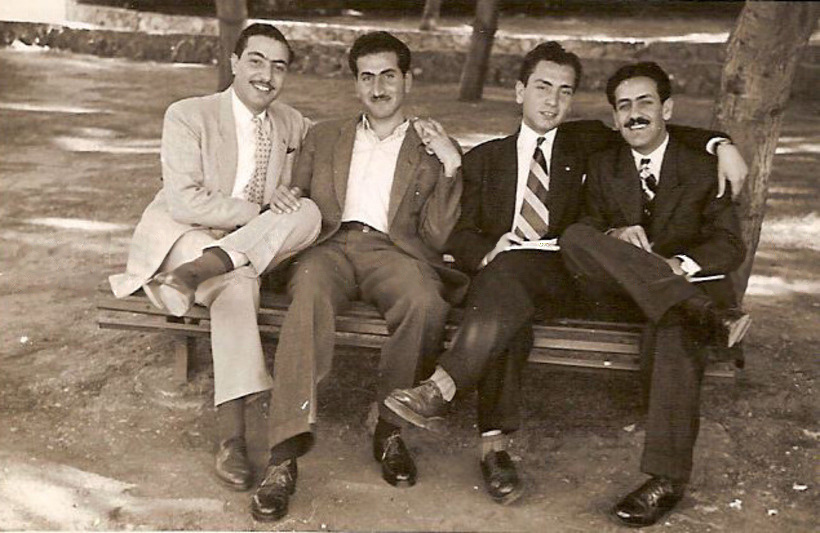
Hasan Mraywed and Mansour al-Atrash at the American University of Beirut in the 1940s

Atrash was born 3 February 1925 in the Druze community of al-Qurayya in Jabal al-Druze (Jabal al-Arab), months before the Great Syrian Revolt, which was launched and led by his father Sultan al-Atrash. At the time, the Jabal al-Druze area constituted an autonomous zone (existing between 1922 and 1936) within the French Mandate of Syria (established in 1920). Tensions between the Druze and the French authorities stemmed from a number of reasons, particularly what the local Druze leaders saw as French encroachment into their domestic affairs and self-governance. The revolt began in the summer of 1925 and had soon spread throughout Syria, ending with the military defeat of Syrian rebels in 1927 and the self-imposed exile of Sultan to Transjordan after the Mandatory authorities issued a warrant for his arrest. He returned in 1937 after being pardoned by the authorities.

It was in Transjordan, and later in Damascus and Beirut, that Mansur completed his primary and secondary education. In 1946, Mansur went to study at the American University in Beirut (AUB), and graduated in 1948 with a BA in political science. In 1951, he attained a law degree from the Sorbonne University. He also served as a lecturer on Arabic literature in the University of Damascus.

== Ba'ath Party and conflict with Shishakli ==
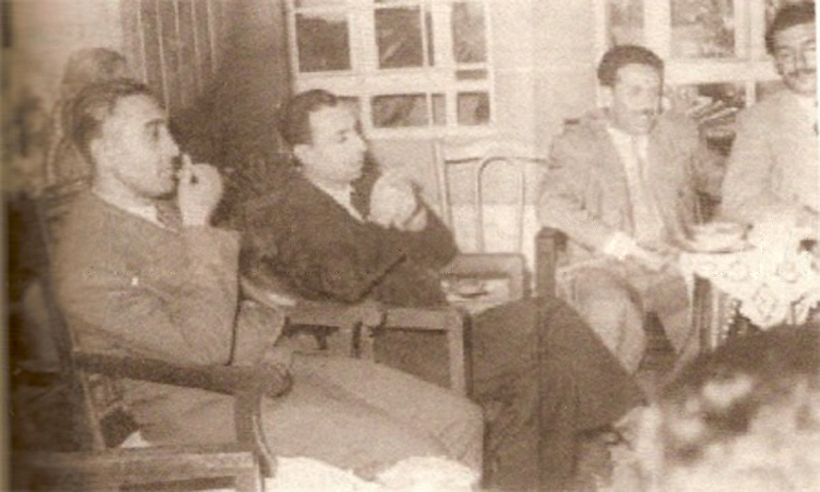
Founders of the Baath Party during its formation in Damascus - April 1947

In 1947 Atrash, an ardent socialist and Arab nationalist 'in principle and practice," according to historian Sami Moubayed, became a founding member of the Ba'ath Party. He joined the organization during his time at the AUB and then left with his party colleagues Salah al-Din al-Bitar and Michel Aflaq for further studies in Paris. He became part of its Syrian regional branch, and actively participated in party strikes, marches and parades. Atrash wrote regularly for the party newspaper al-Ba'ath. He was the only prominent Druze member in the Ba'ath Party who hailed from a major clan, the al-Atrash.

General Adib Shishakli seized power in 1951, establishing a military-backed autocracy. Atrash participated in anti-Shishakli activity, including throwing explosives at Shishakli's residence in 1952, an action which resulted in Atrash's arrest. In 1953 Shishakli launched a crackdown on the Druze community, claiming they were being funded by Hashemite-ruled Jordan and Iraq to establish a Hashemite government in Syria. Jabal al-Druze was bombarded by government forces and Atrash's father Sultan was put under house arrest for his vocal criticism of Shishakli.

After Shishakli came into conflict with the Ba'athists that year as a result of the former's authoritarian manner of governance, Atrash moved to Homs, a hotbed of opposition to Shishakli's rule, where he helped coordinate the supply of arms to insurgents in Jabal al-Druze. He was arrested by the authorities for a second time in May, during the peak of the unrest. He had been released both times because of his father's popularity at the national level; by releasing Atrash, Shishakli attempted to gain the appeasement of Sultan. In response to Atrash's second release from prison, Sultan said "I didn't ask Shishakli for the freedom of my son. I asked him for the freedom of my country."

According to Moubayed, Atrash's anti-government activities significantly contributed to Shishakli's resignation and departure from Syria in February 1954 amid the countrywide unrest. In the first post-Shishakli democratic election later that year, Atrash was elected to parliament. Atrash was offered a cabinet position in Said al-Ghazzi's September 1955 government, but he rejected the offer because of the Ba'ath Party's opposition to the government's makeup.

== UAR period and Ba'athist Syria ==
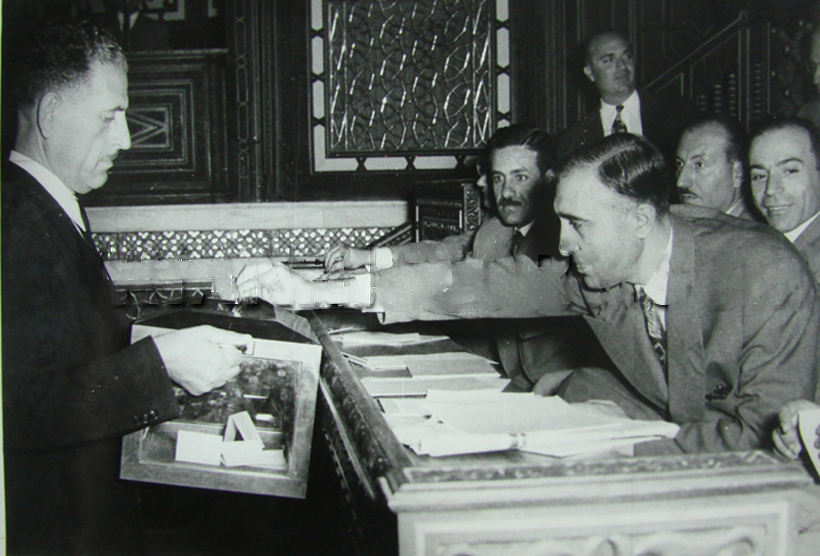
Baath MPs Salah al-Bitar and Mansour al-Atrash voting in Parliament - 1955

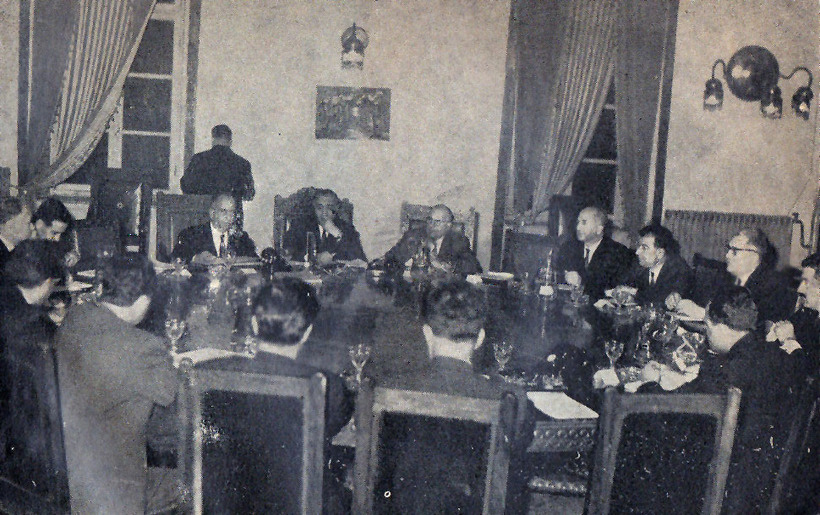
The first meeting of the Syrian government after the Baath coup of March 8, 1963

Atrash supported formation of the United Arab Republic (UAR), a union between Syria and Egypt, in 1958. During the UAR years, Atrash became a devoted Nasserite—a supporter of President Gamal Abdel Nasser's policies—and wrote several articles in Nasserite daily newspaper Al Jamahir ("The People.") Atrash opposed the break-up of the union after a secessionist coup in September 1961, and opposed playing a political role in the anti-unionist governments that succeeded the UAR; Prime Minister Bashir al-Azma (term in 1962) offered him a cabinet post, but he turned down the offer, citing his ideological opposition to a secessionist government. Prime Minister Khalid al-Azm (term in 1962–63) appointed him minister of social affairs without asking him, but Atrash turned down that job as well.

His seclusion from Syrian politics ended after the Military Committee of the Ba'ath Party took power in a coup d'état on 8 March 1963. The Military Committee's stated goal was to reestablish a pan-Arab state; a goal Atrash shared. He was appointed Minister of Labor and Social Affairs in Salah al-Din al-Bitar's first government, and became a member of the Presidential Council, an organ responsible for running day-to-day state affairs. In February 1964 Atrash was elected to the 12-member Ba'ath Party National Command, which was nominally the highest policy-making body of the party.

Differences between Bitar and the Regional Command had developed in 1964, with the latter viewing Bitar's cabinet as being right-leaning and soft on "reactionary" elements within Syria in the aftermath of Hama uprising in April of that year by the Muslim Brotherhood. President Amin al-Hafiz had been prime minister at the time of the unrest and stepped down in response to countrywide strikes and demonstrations in protest at the severity of the uprising's suppression. Bitar replaced Hafiz to serve a second term as prime minister in May, publicly promising to protect civil liberties. Intra-party tensions culminated with the Regional Command withdrawing its confidence from Bitar's government on 25 September, and Bitar and Atrash (an associate of Bitar) subsequently resigning from the Presidential Council. Their positions were filled by Salah Jadid and Yusuf Zuaiyin, respectively, and effectively brought the Presidential Council under the full control of the Military Committee and the Regional Command. Hafiz also replaced Bitar as premier in October, although Atrash remained in his ministerial post.

On 1 September 1965 Atrash was appointed Chairman of the Revolutionary Command Council (RCC), but acquired little de facto power because of the Military Committee's overarching control, with Atrash later remarking "the officers let us do the talking although, as we later discovered, they had agreed beforehand ... what the decisions would be." The RCC played the role of parliament and Atrash was its speaker. In December tensions between the National Command (loyal to Aflaq and Bitar) and the Regional Command (loyal to Jadid and backed by the military) grew worse as elements of the former attempted to align with Military Committee member Muhammad Umran in an effort to split the military's support (and according to Syria expert Itamar Rabinovich, the Alawite officers' solid backing) of Jadid. However, Atrash, along with Munif al-Razzaz of Jordan and Jubran al-Majdalani and Ali al-Khalil of Lebanon, was a part of the group in the National Command that opposed confrontation with the Regional Command, citing the National Command's lack of military support and political power as well as the fundamental weakness of an alliance with Umran and Amin al-Hafiz. The latter two had been engaged in an antagonistic rivalry over leadership of the Military Committee.

Atrash continued to hold the office of RCC, and was reelected as speaker on 15 February 1966, shortly before the 1966 Syrian coup d'état (21–23 February), which brought the left-wing neo-Ba'athist government of Jadid to power and caused an internal party split. The Jadid government's coming to power resulted in the self-imposed exile of the leading Ba'ath ideologue Michel Aflaq. Atrash, a partisan of Aflaq, was arrested and jailed in the Mezzeh Prison during the coup. The new defense minister and future president Hafez al-Assad later paid him a visit to discuss Syria's political situation and check on his health.

On 9 June 1967, when the Israeli Army occupied the Golan Heights during the Six-Day War, Atrash and other Aflaq loyalists were released from their detention. Atrash later remarked that "It was not agreeable to know that we owed our freedom to defeat." In collaboration with dissenting Ba'athist officer Salim Hatum, Atrash attempted to overthrow Jadid's government in 1967, but failed. Following this unsuccessful coup attempt, he moved into self-imposed exile in Lebanon and lived there until the death of Abd al-Karim al-Jundi, the head of Syria's secret intelligence service. He returned to Syria in 1969 and lived much of the remainder of his life in seclusion.

== Later life and death ==
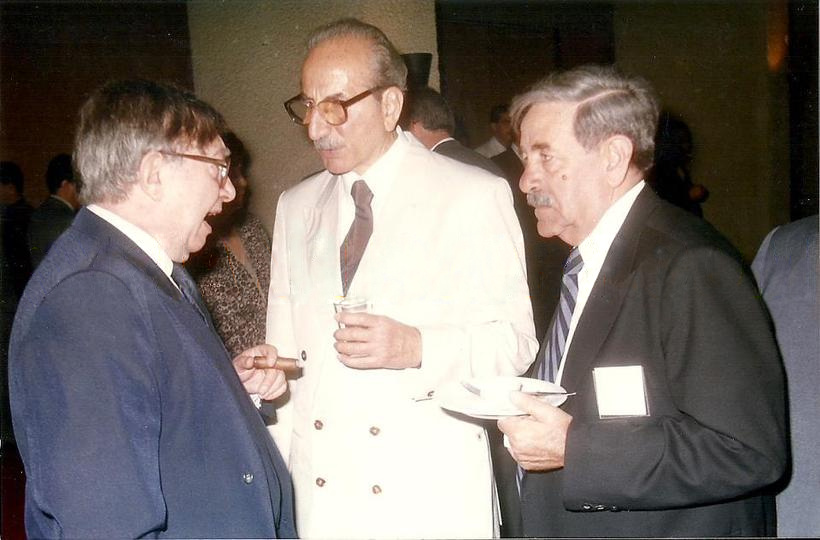
Baath Party veterans at a cocktail reception in 2002

In 1978 Atrash hosted a dinner aimed at healing the rift between the ruling Ba'ath governments of Syria and neighboring Iraq. The dinner was attended by such notables as Iraqi foreign minister Tariq Aziz and Syrian defense minister Mustafa Tlass. Between 2000 and 2006 Atrash was a member of an organization in support of the Palestinian uprising against Israel. Between 2001 and 2006 he presided over the Syrian Arab Committee, which aimed to end the sanctions against Iraq and later support it after the 2003 invasion. In August 1956 Atrash married teacher Hind al-Shuwayri, a Christian and the daughter of Yusuf al-Shuwayri, Sultan's partner in the grain trade, who was based in al-Midan and owned a house in al-Qurayya. Atrash had a son named Tha'er and a daughter named Rim. Because Atrash's wife was not from the Druze community, the marriage caused a temporary schism between Atrash and his father. Eventually the two bridged their differences. Following Sultan's death in 1982, Mansur gained the latter's role as the major spokesman for the al-Atrash clan.

Atrash died at 6:30 am on 14 November 2006, at the age of 80. His funeral was held in the city of al-Suwayda, and according to one of his relatives, Talal al-Atrash, the ceremony was attended by "hundreds of thousands" of Druze from Syria, Lebanon and Jordan as well as some "prominent Arab personalities." Atrash was buried in the woodland area of Hushus which he owned, near his native al-Qurayya.
