= Salim Hatum =

Syrian politician (1928–1967)

- سليم حاطوم
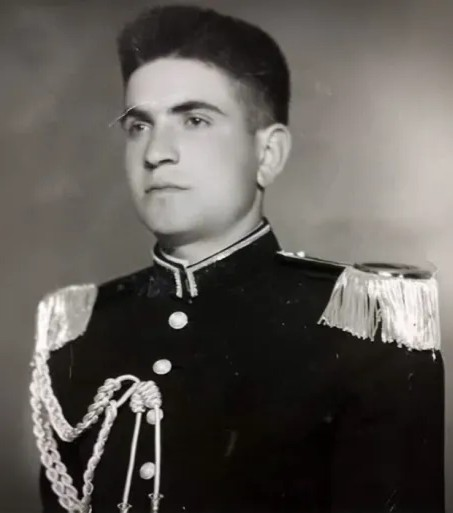

Commander of Radio and Television Station Garrison
- In office 8 March 1963 – 28 September 1966

Member of the Regional Command of the Syrian Regional Branch
- In office 1 August 1965 – 19 December 1965

Personal details
- Born: 1928 Thaybin, Jabal al-Druze State, French Mandate of Syria
- Died: 26 June 1967 (age 39) Damascus, Syria
- Cause of death: Execution by firing squad
- Party: Ba'ath Party
- Education: Homs Military Academy

Military service
- Allegiance: Second Syrian Republic; United Arab Republic; Ba'athist Syria
- Branch/service: Syrian Army

Salim Hatum (Arabic: سليم حاطوم; 1928 – 26 June 1967) was a Syrian military officer and politician who played a significant role in Syrian politics in the 1960s. A member of the Syrian Regional Branch of the Arab Socialist Ba'ath Party, he was instrumental in the 1966 Syrian coup d'état that toppled the government of Amin al-Hafiz, also a Ba'athist. That same year he launched an insurrection from his home region of Jabal al-Druze against his colleagues who formed the new government but sidelined him from any major position. He fled Syria amid a warrant for his arrest, but returned in 1967 and was subsequently jailed and executed.

== Early life ==
Hatum was born in the village of Dhibin near the town of Salkhad in the Jabal al-Druze region of southern Syria, during French Mandatory rule. His family were followers of the Druze religion. Historian Hanna Batatu describes Hatum's family as part of the "middle landed class," while historian Patrick Seale describes them "poor." His father had been a director of the census in the area.

== Military and political career ==
=== Early career and 1963 coup ===
Hatum began his military career in the Homs Military Academy, where he also joined the Ba'ath Party, an Arab nationalist movement, headed by Michel Aflaq. After graduating he became an officer in the Syrian Army, with the rank of captain. In 1958 Syria and Egypt merged under the leadership of Gamal Abdel Nasser to form the United Arab Republic. In September 1961 the union was ended after a coup by secessionist officers in Syria. Arab nationalist officers sought to topple the secessionist government of Nazim al-Qudsi and formed an alliance within the military to launch a coup in 1963. Hatum was one of the few Ba'athist officers among the Arab nationalists in the army during this period, although the Ba'athists were the most organized force unofficially headed by a secretive grouping known as the Military Committee and officially, if only nominally, organized by the political party under Aflaq.

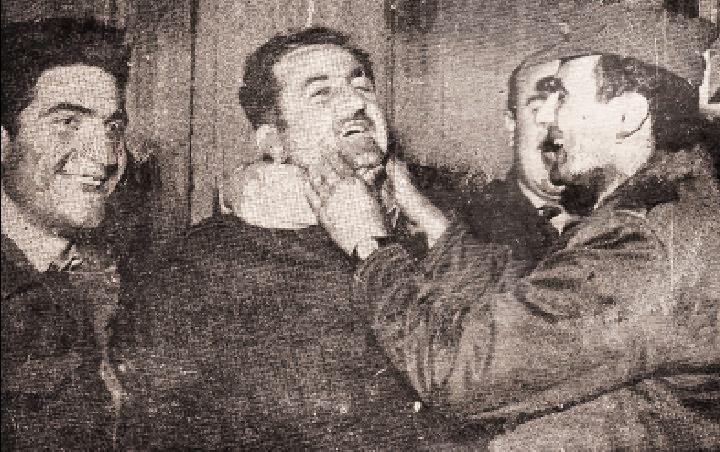
Participants in the 1963 coup celebrating its success. From left to right: Hatum, Muhammad Umran and Salah Jadid

On 7–8 March 1963 Ziad al-Hariri, an independent unionist officer, headed the coup by leading the takeover of Damascus, capturing several strategic points in the city. Meanwhile, Hatum led the unionists' capture of the city's radio station. It then broadcast that the National Council for the Revolutionary Command had replaced the secessionist government and that it was reinstating several discharged Ba'athist officers into the army, including all of those on the Military Committee, which at that time was made of Muhammad Umran, Salah Jadid, Hafez al-Assad, Abd al-Karim al-Jundi and Ahmad al-Mir. Following the coup's success, Hatum was appointed to the Military Committee, which was expanded to include more members. He was subsequently promoted to the rank of major. In addition to the commando unit he headed prior to the coup, Hatum was also made the commander of the army garrisons posted near the strategic radio and television stations.

Hatum was elected as a member of the Regional Command of the Syrian Regional Branch on 1 August 1965, serving one term that lasted until 19 December of that year. That year, he also served on the military tribunal to try Israeli spy Eli Cohen.

=== 1966 coup and aftermath ===
The Military Committee increasingly challenged the authority of President Amin al-Hafiz and Prime Minister Salah al-Din al-Bitar, both staunch allies of Aflaq. In February 1966, the regionalist faction of the Committee launched a coup to topple the government. Jadid assigned Hatum to command a special force and arrest Hafiz from his home in Damascus. Hafiz resisted and a firefight between him and Hatum's men ensued. Hatum ordered tank fire against his home and armed clashes raged throughout the city, ending in the deaths of some 50 people. Hafiz was wounded and his daughter lost an eye during the battle, before Hafiz surrendered himself.

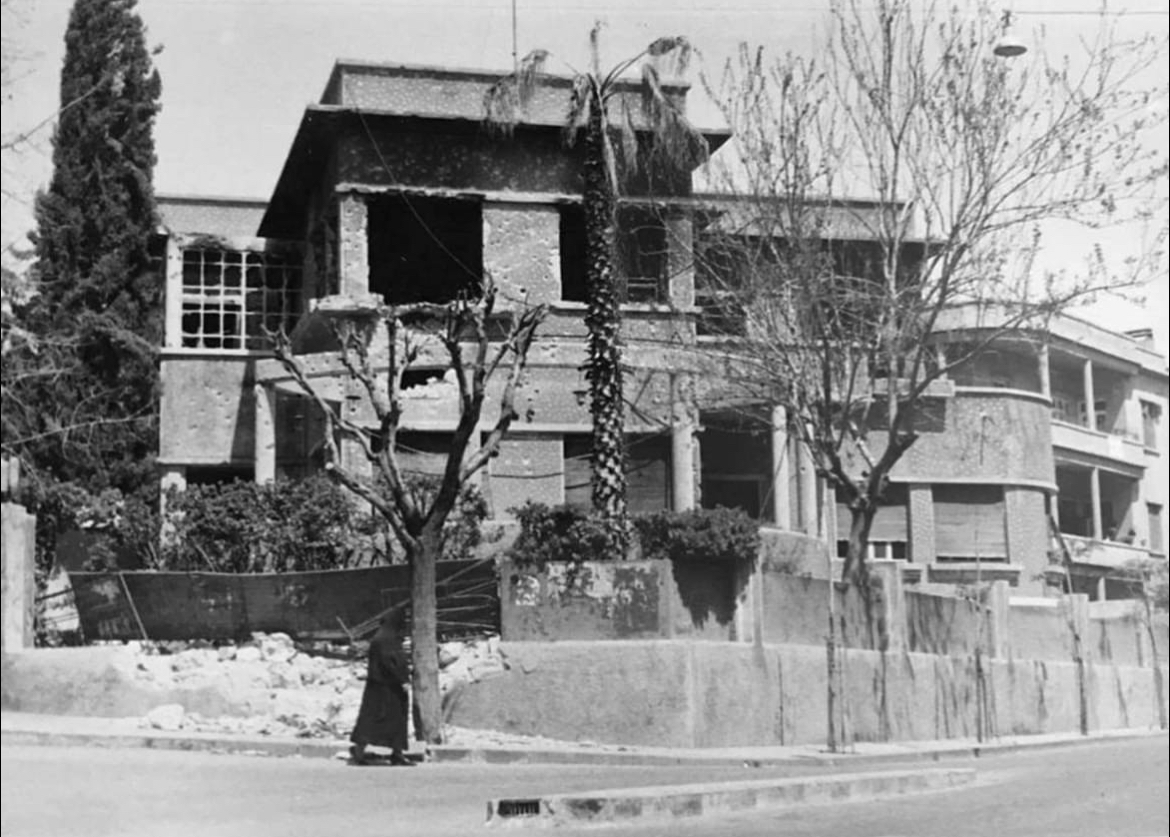
The house of Amin al-Hafiz, which was shelled during the 1966 coup

Hatum felt he was not properly rewarded for his role in the 1966 coup, having been kept from any position in the Ba'ath Party's Regional Command or the Syrian government. Instead he kept his post in the Committee and command over Damascus' radio station. The leaders of the coup, Jadid and Hafez al-Assad, viewed Hatum as reckless and deplored the severe use of force he deployed and the consequent mass casualties when he arrested Hafiz. Hatum decided to oust Jadid and Assad by establishing contact with officers and party figures who had been loyal to Bitar and Hafiz, namely former secretary-general of the party's National Command Munif al-Razzaz and former deputy chief of staff Fahd al-Sha'ir.

A coup was planned for 1 July, but delayed until 3 September, upon Hatum's insistence. In the meantime, in August, one of Hatum's co-conspirators, colonel Talal Abu Asali, publicly cursed Jadid and promised to avenge Hafiz during a drinking session with other officers. As a result, he was arrested the following day by Chief of Staff Ahmad Suwaydani, who assigned Hatum (who was far from suspicion at that point) to head the investigation against Asali. During the interrogation, Hatum reportedly whispered to Asali "I will kill anyone who talks". Jadid became suspicious of Hatum for unclear reasons, stripped him of his investigative role and assigned Syrian intelligence head, Abd al-Karim al-Jundi, to head the interrogation. After Jundi allegedly tortured Asali, the latter confessed that Sha'ir and Razzaz were planning a coup against the new government, but did not mention Hatum. Jundi subsequently led a crackdown against officers belonging to the Druze community, like Sha'ir and Hatum, arresting over 200 military personnel. Asali was released.

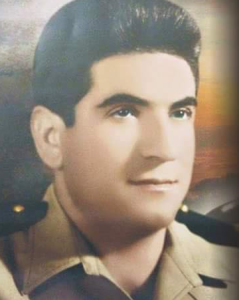
Hatum photo in military uniform

Tensions in the predominantly Druze region of Jabal al-Druze, prompted Jadid and President Nureddin al-Atassi to visit the regional capital of Suwayda to alleviate the situation. After hearing of their visit, an incensed Hatum had Asali surround Suwayda with tanks, while Hatum entered the city's party headquarters where Jadid and Atassi were meeting local officials. He threatened to kill them, but after pressure from local elders, he reneged and had them detained instead. Defense Minister Assad, who was in Damascus, ordered Hatum to release Jadid and Atassi, which Hatum rejected. Assad subsequently ordered the aerial and ground bombardment of Suwayda, until he put an end to Hatum's mutiny.

== Downfall and death ==
Hatum and Asali fled south to Jordan, where King Hussein gave them asylum. Afterward, four hundred of Hatum's loyalists in the officers corps were dismissed, reassigned or arrested, in an unprecedented purge in Syrian military history, while in March 1967, Mustafa Tlass headed a military court that tried Hatum in absentia. Hatum was sentenced to death.

Sectarianism increasingly played a role in the rivalry and confrontation between the two camps, with the Druze and to an extent the Sunni Muslim officers set against the Alawite officers like Jadid and Assad, who were largely in control of the country's military and internal security networks at that time. Hatum stated in a press conference in Jordan, that sectarianism was taking hold in the Syrian Army, with the purges undertaken by Assad and Jadid resulting in the entrenchment of Alawite power in the country, with Alawite officers taking up key positions in the state. He further asserted that Alawites outnumbered non-Alawites in the officer corps five to one and the government was leading Syria under the slogan of "One Nusayri state with an eternal message." This was a mock reference to the Ba'athist motto "One Arab nation with an eternal message", replacing "Arab" with "Nusayri", which is a derogatory name for Alawite.

Following Syria's defeat in the 1967 Six-Day War with Israel, Hatum announced that he would return to Syria to fight the Israelis. He felt Jadid would not pursue the death warrant against him with his government now weakened by the defeat. After he reentered the country, he took up protection by the popular Syrian nationalist Druze leader Sultan al-Atrash in Jabal al-Druze. However, he was arrested by the authorities to Atrash's protestations and brought to court, where Tlass confirmed the death sentence and Hatum was executed by firing squad on 26 June. Tlass later took personal responsibility for his execution, stating Hatum "lost the correct path by conspiring with Jordan".

== Depictions in popular culture ==
Hatum is portrayed by Hassam Ghancy in the 2019 OCS/Netflix miniseries The Spy.

== See also ==
- List of Druze

== Bibliography ==
- Batatu, Hanna (1999). Syria's Peasantry, the Descendants of Its Lesser Rural Notables, and Their Politics. Princeton University Press. ISBN 0-691-00254-1.
- Moosa, Matti (1987). Extremist Shiites: The Ghulat Sects. Syracuse University Press. ISBN 9780815624110.
- Moubayed, Sami M. (2006). Steel & Silk: Men and Women who shaped Syria 1900–2000. Cune Press. ISBN 978-1-885942-41-8.
- Rabinovich, Itamar (1972). Syria Under the Baʻth, 1963–66: The Army Party Symbiosis. Transaction Publishers.
- Seale, Patrick (1990). Asad of Syria: The Struggle for the Middle East. University of California Press. ISBN 978-0-520-06976-3.
