= 1966 Syrian coup d'état =

1966 neo-Ba'athist military coup in Syria

- Part of the Arab Cold War
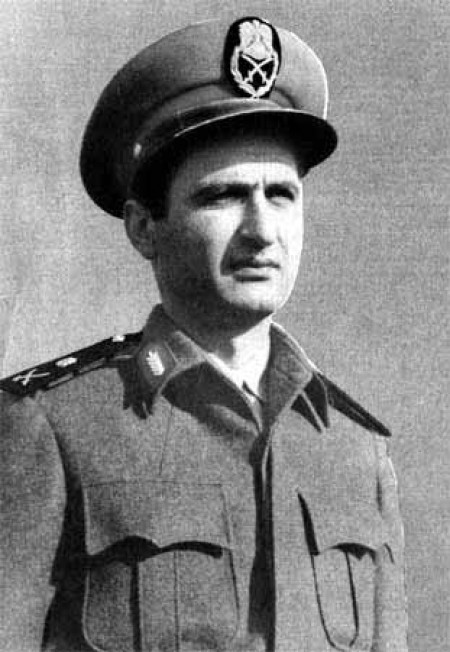
- General Salah Jadid, Chief of Staff of the Syrian Arab Armed Forces, who launched the coup
Date	21–23 February 1966
Location	Syria
Result	Neo-Ba'athist victory: Overthrow of the Aflaqists; Salah Jadid becomes de facto ruler of the Syrian Arab Republic; Execution of Salim Hatum after failed coup attempt; Power-struggle between Salah Jadid and Hafez al-Assad

Belligerents
National Command of the Ba'ath Party: Syrian government	Syrian Regional Branch of the Ba'ath Party

Commanders and leaders
Michel Aflaq; The preeminent figure of the National Command of the Arab Socialist Ba'ath Party; Munif al-Razzaz; Sect. Gen. of the National Command of the Arab Socialist Ba'ath Party; Prime Minister of Syria; Amin al-Hafiz; Salah al-Din al-Bitar; President of Syria; Shibli al-Aysami; Vice President of Syria; Muhammad Umran; Minister of Defence	Salah Jadid; Assistant Regional Secretary of the Regional Command of the Syrian Regional Branch; Maj. Gen. Hafez al-Assad; Commander of the Syrian Air Force; Maj. Salim Hatum; Syrian Army commander Lt. Col. Mustafa Tlas; Syrian Army commander

Casualties and losses
- 400 killed

In the 1966 Syrian coup d'état (21–23 February) the government of the Syrian Arab Republic was overthrown and replaced. The ruling National Command of the Arab Socialist Ba'ath Party were removed from power by a union of the party's Military Committee and the Syrian Regional Branch, under the leadership of Salah Jadid.

The coup was precipitated by a heightening in the power struggle between the party's old guard, represented by Michel Aflaq, Salah al-Din al-Bitar, and Munif al-Razzaz, and the radical leftist factions adhering to a Neo-Ba'athist position. On 21 February, supporters of the old guard in the army ordered the transfer of their rivals. Two days later, the Military Committee, backing the radical leftist factions, launched a coup that involved violent fighting in Aleppo, Damascus, Deir ez-Zor, and Latakia. As a result of the coup, the party's historical founders fled the country and spent the rest of their lives in exile.

The Ba'athist military committee's seizure of power and subsequent purges marked the total ideological transformation of the Syrian Ba'ath party into a militarist neo-Ba'athist organization, independent of the National Command of the original Ba'ath party. Salah Jadid established the most radical administration in modern Syrian history. The coup created a permanent schism between the Syrian and Iraqi regional branches of the Ba'ath Party and their respective National Commands, with many senior Syrian Ba'athists defecting to Iraq. Salah Jadid's government would subsequently be overthrown in the 1970 Syrian coup d'etat, which brought his military rival Hafez al-Assad to power. Despite this, the Assad regime and Ba'athist Iraq continued its propaganda campaigns against each other and the Ba'athist schism persisted.

== Background ==
=== Consolidation of power ===
After the success of the 1963 Syrian coup d'état, officially the 8th of March Revolution, a power struggle erupted between the Nasserites in the National Council for the Revolutionary Command and the Ba'ath Party. The Nasserites sought to reestablish the United Arab Republic, the former federation encompassing Egypt and Syria from 1958 to 1961, on Gamal Abdel Nasser's terms, but the Ba'athists were skeptical of a new union with Nasser and wanted a loose federation where the Ba'ath Party could rule Syria alone without interference. The Nasserites mobilised large street demonstrations in favour of a union. It took time before the Ba'ath Party knew how to respond to the issue, since the majority of Syrian Arab Nationalists were not adherents to Ba'athism, but of Nasserism and Nasser in general.

Instead of trying to win the support of the populace, the Ba'athists moved to consolidate their control over the Syrian military. Several hundred Nasserites and conservatives were purged from the military, and Ba'athists were recruited to fill senior positions. Most of the newly recruited Ba'athist officers came from the countryside or from a low social class. These Ba'athist officers replaced the chiefly "urban Sunni upper-middle and middle class" officer corps, and replaced it with an officer corps with a rural background who more often the "kinsmen of the leading minority officer". These changes led to the decimation of Sunni control over the military establishment.

The cost of clamping down on the protests was a loss of legitimacy, and the emergence of Amin al-Hafiz as the first Ba'athist military strongman. In 1965, Amin al-Hafiz imposed the socialist policies adopted in the 6th National Congress; fully nationalizing Syrian industry, vast segments of private sector and established a centralized command economy. The traditional elite, consisting of the upper classes, who had been overthrown from political power by the Ba'athists, felt threatened by the Ba'ath Party's socialist policies. The Muslim Brotherhood in Syria was a historical rival of the Syrian Regional Branch, and it felt threatened by the party's secularist nature. Akram al-Hawrani and his supporters and the Syrian Communist Party opposed the one-party system which the Ba'ath Party was establishing.

The majority of Sunni Muslims were Arab nationalists, but not Ba'athist, making them feel alienated. The party was chiefly dominated by minority groups such as Alawites, Druzes, and Isma'ilis, and people from the countryside in general; this created an urban–rural conflict based predominantly on ethnic differences. With its coming to power, the Ba'ath Party was threatened by the predominantly anti-Ba'athist sentiment in urban politics – probably the only reason why the Ba'athists managed to stay in power was the rather weakly organised and fragmented opposition it faced.

=== Conflict with the Aflaqists ===
Cohesive internal unity had all but collapsed after the 1963 seizure of power; Michel Aflaq, Salah al-Din al-Bitar, and their followers wanted to implement "classic" Ba'athism in the sense that they wanted to establish a loose union with Nasser's Egypt, implement a moderate form of socialism, and to have a one-party state which respected the rights of the individual, tolerating freedom of speech and freedom of thought. However, the Aflaqites (or Aflaqists) were quickly forced into the background, and at the 6th National Ba'ath Party Congress, the Military Committee and their supporters succeeding in adopting a new ideological document known as Muntalaqat and creating a new form of Ba'athism strongly influenced by Marxism–Leninism. This new form of Ba'athism laid emphasis on "revolution in one country" rather than to unifying the Arab world. At the same time, the 6th National Congress implemented a resolution which stressed the implementation of a socialist revolution in Syria. Under this form of socialism, the economy as a whole would adhere to state planning and the commanding heights of the economy and foreign trade were to be nationalized. They believed these policies would end exploitation of labour, that capitalism would disappear, and in agriculture they envisioned a plan were land was given "to he who works it". However, private enterprise would still exist in retail trade, construction, tourism, and small industry in general. These changes and more would refashion the Ba'ath Party into a Leninist party.

In the aftermath of the 1964 riot in Hama and other cities, the radicals were on the retreat and the Aflaqites regained control for a brief period. Bitar formed a new government which halted the nationalisation process, reaffirm respect for civil liberties and private property. However, these policy changes did not win sufficient support, and the population at large still opposed Ba'ath Party rule. The upper classes continued to disinvest capital and smuggle capital out of the country, and the only foreseeable solution to this loss of capital was continuing with nationalisation.

Syrian Ba'ath party's left-wing argued that the bourgeoisie would never be won over unless they were given total control over the economy as they had before. It was this power struggle between the moderate Aflaqites who dominated the National Command of the Ba'ath Party and the radicals who dominated the Syrian Regional Command of the Ba'ath Party which led to the 1966 coup d'état. Between 1963 and 1966, neo-Ba'athist radicals, who controlled the Ba'athist military committee, began steadily amassing power and influence within the Syrian regional branch of the Ba'ath party.

== Power struggle ==
Before the crushing of the riots of 1964, a power struggle started within the Military Committee between Minister of Defence Muhammad Umran, and Salah Jadid. Umran, the committee's most senior member, wanted reconciliation with the rioters and an end to confrontation with the middle class, in contrast, Jadid believed the solution was to coerce and repress the protesters so as to save the 8th of March Revolution. This was the first open schism within the Military Committee, and would prove decisive in coming events. With Hafez al-Assad's support, the Military Committee initiated a violent counter-attack on the rioters This decision led to Umran's downfall. He responded by revealing the Military Committee's plan of taking over the Ba'ath Party to the party's National Command. Aflaq, the Secretary General of the National Command, responded to the information by ordering the dissolution of the Syrian Regional Command. He was forced to withdraw his request because the party's rank-and-file rose in protest. When an old guard Ba'athist tauntingly asked Aflaq "how big a role his party still played in government", Aflaq replied "About one-thousandth of one percent". Umran's revelations to the National Command led to his exile, and with the National Command impotent, the Military Committee, through its control of the Syrian Regional Command, initiated an attack on the bourgeoisie and initiated a nationalisation drive which extended state ownership to electricity generation, oil distribution, cotton ginning, and to an estimated 70 percent of foreign trade.

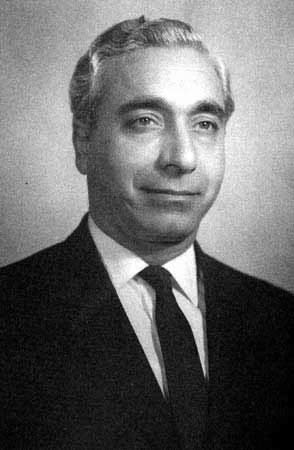
Amin al-Hafiz, Ba'athist leader and President of Syria during 1963-1966

After Umran's downfall, the National Command and the Military Committee continued their respective struggle for control of the Ba'ath Party. While the National Command invoked party rules and regulations against the Military Committee, it was clear from the beginning that the initiative lay with the Military Committee. The reason for the Military Committee's success was its alliance with the Regionalists, a group of branches which had not adhered to Aflaq's 1958 orders to dissolve the Syrian Regional Branch. The Regionalists disliked Aflaq and opposed his leadership. Assad called the Regionalists the "true cells of the party".

The power contest between the allied Military Committee and the Regionalists against the National Command was fought out within the party structure. However, the Military Committee and the Regionalists managed to turn the party structure on its head. At the 2nd Regional Congress (held in March 1965), it was decided to endorse the principle that the Regional Secretary of the Regional Command would be the ex officio head of state, and the Regional Command acquired the power to appoint the prime minister, the cabinet, the chief of staff, and the top military commanders. This change curtailed the powers of the National Command, who thenceforth had very little say in Syrian internal affairs. In response, at the 8th National Congress (April 1965) Aflaq had originally planned to launch an attack on the Military Committee and the Regionalists, but was persuaded not to by fellow National Command members – most notably by a Lebanese member, Jibran Majdalani, and a Saudi member, Ali Ghannam – because it could lead to the removal of the party's civilian leadership, as had occurred in the Iraqi Regional Branch. Because of this decision, Aflaq was voted from office as secretary general, to be succeeded by fellow National Command member Munif al-Razzaz. Razzaz was a Syrian-born Jordanian who was not rooted enough in party politics to solve the crisis, even if under his command several joint meetings of the National and Regional Commands took place. Not longer after Aflaq's loss of office, Hafiz, the Secretary of the Regional Command, changed his allegiance to support the National Command. While Hafiz was the de jure leader of Syria (he held the offices of Regional Command secretary, Chairman of the Presidential Council, prime minister and commander-in-chief), it was Jadid, the Assistant Secretary General of the Regional Command, who was the de facto leader of Syria.

== The coup ==
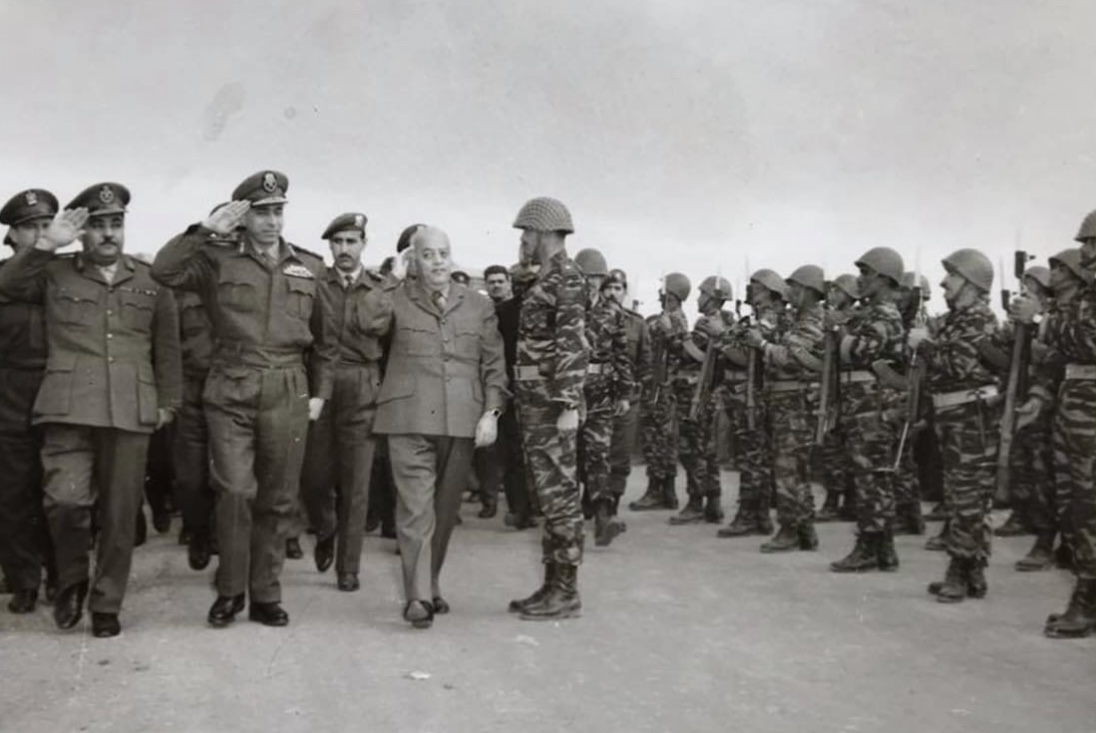
Amin al-Hafiz meets the Palestine Liberation Army parade, just before his overthrow

Arrangements devised in 1963 between Aflaq and the Military Committee led to a very close mutual involvement of the military and civilian sectors of the regime, so that by the end of 1965 the politics of the Syrian army had become almost identical to the politics of the Ba'th Party. The principal military protagonist of the period Hafiz, Jadid, and Umran were no longer on military service and their power depended on their intermediary supporters in the army and in the party. In November 1965, the National Command issued a resolution which stated it was forbidden for the Regional Command to transfer or dismiss military officers without the consent of the National Command. After hearing of the resolution, Jadid rebelled immediately, and ordered Colonel Mustafa Tlas to arrest the commanders of the Homs garrison and his deputy, both supporters of National Command. In response, Razzaz called for an emergency session of the National Command which decreed the Regional Command dissolved, and made Bitar Prime Minister. Hafiz was made chairman of a new Presidential Council and Shibli al-Aysami his deputy. Umran was recalled from exile and reappointed to the office of Minister of Defence and commander-in-chief, and Mansur al-Atrash was appointed chairman of a new and expanded National Revolutionary Council. Jadid and his supporters responded by making war on the National Command. Assad, who neither liked nor had sympathy for the Aflaqites, did not support a showdown through the use of force. In response to the coming coup, Assad, along with Naji Jamil, Husayn Mulhim and Yusuf Sayigh, left for London.

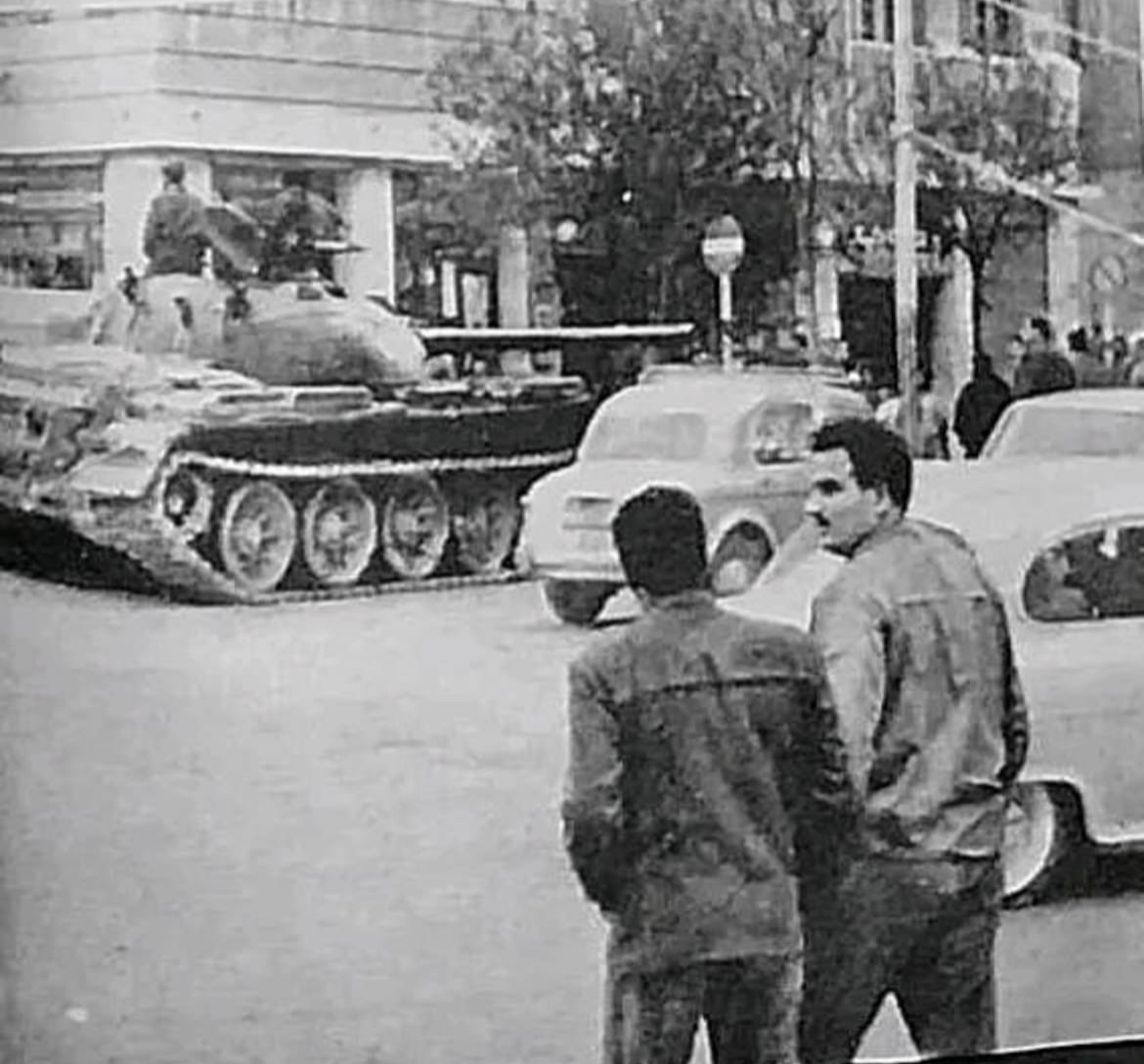
Syrian tank during the 1966 coup d'état

The coup began on 21 February 1966 when Umran tested his authority as Minister of Defence by ordering the transfer of three key Jadid supporters; Major-General Ahmed Suidani, Colonel Izzad Jadid and Major Salim Hatum. The Military Committee would respond the next day, but before that it staged a ruse which threw the National Command off balance. The ruse was that Abd al-Ghani Ibrahim, the Alawi commander of the front facing Israel, reported to headquarters that a quarrel had broken out among front-line officers, and that guns had been used. Umran, al-Hafiz and the Chief of Staff left for the Golan Heights in a hurry for a lengthy discussion with the officer corps there; when they returned at 3 am on 23 February they were exhausted. Two hours later, at 5 am, Jadid launched his coup. Not long after, the attack on al-Hafiz's private residence began, led by Salim Hatum and Rifaat al-Assad, and supported by a squadron of tank units led by Izzad Jadid. Despite a spirited defence, Hafiz's forces surrendered after all their ammunition was spent – Hafiz's daughter lost an eye in the attacks. The commander of al-Hafiz's bodyguard, Mahmud Musa, was nearly killed by Izzad Jadid, but was saved and smuggled out of Syria by Hatum. There was resistance outside Damascus. In Hama, Tlass was forced to send forces from Homs to quell the uprising, while in Aleppo Aflaq loyalists briefly controlled the radio station and some resistance was reported in Latakia and Deir ez-Zor. After their military defeats, resistance all but collapsed – Razzaz was the only National Command member to put up any organised resistance after the military defeats, issuing statements against the government from his different hiding places.

== Aftermath ==
=== Neo-Ba'athist takeover of the Syrian regional branch of the Ba'ath party ===
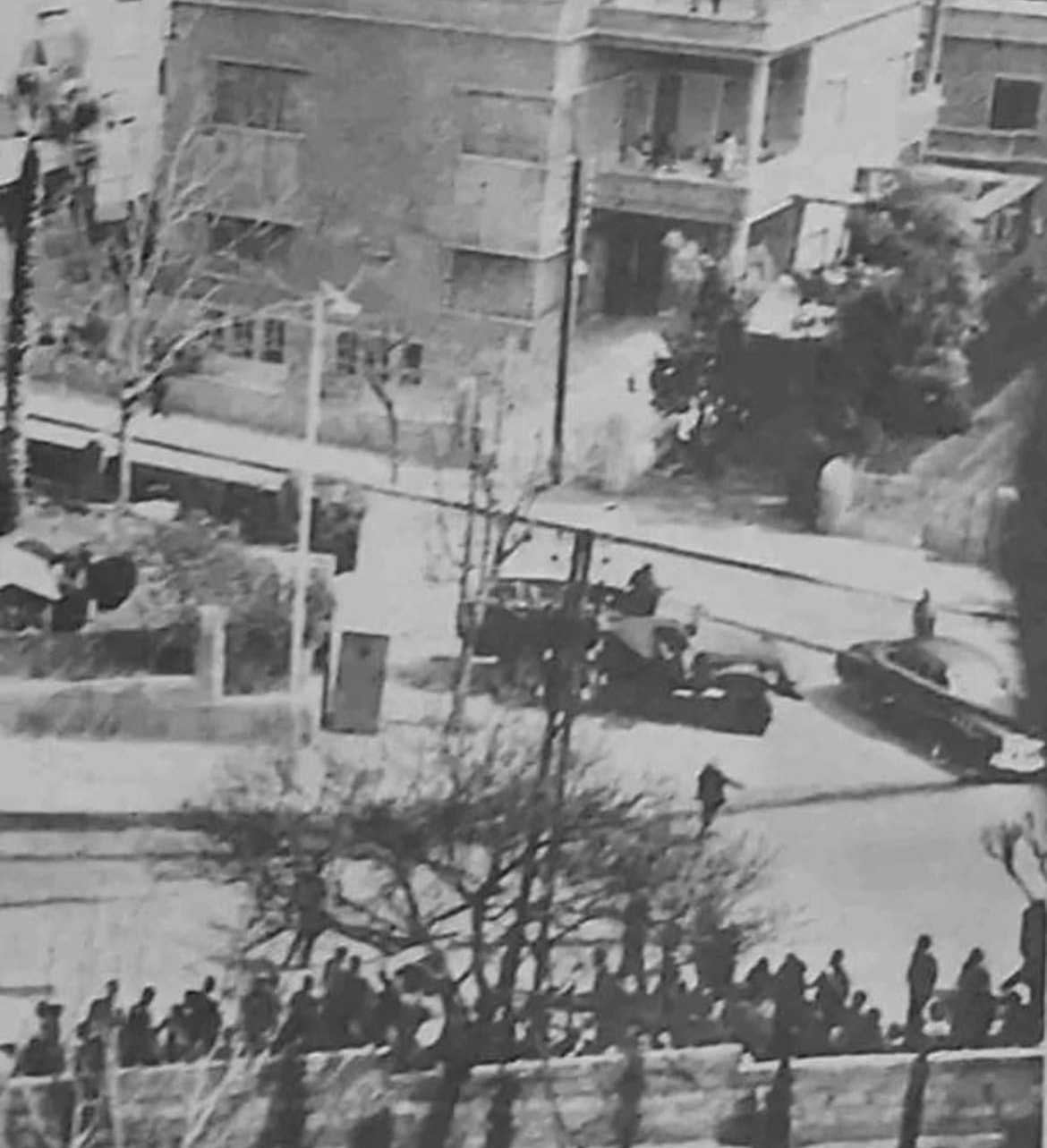
Armored personnel carrier after the coup, 1966

1966 Syrian coup d'état marked the total ideological transformation of the Ba'ath party's Syrian regional branch into a militarist "neo-Ba'ath" organization which became independent of the National Command of the original Ba'ath party. Following its violent seizure of power, which resulted in the deaths of approximately 400 people, the neo-Ba'athist military committee purged the classical Ba'athist leaders of the old guard, like Michel Aflaq and Salah al-Din Bitar. This coup led to a permanent schism between the Syrian and Iraqi regional branches of the Ba'ath Party, and many Syrian Ba'athist leaders defected to Iraq.

Avraham Ben-Tzur asserted that the Ba'athist ideology preached in Syria after the coup should be referred to as neo-Ba'athism since it has nothing to do with the ideology's classic form espoused by Aflaq, Bitar and the Aflaqites in general. Munif al-Razzaz, the last secretary general of the National Command of the original Ba'ath Party, agreed with this assertion, stating that from 1961 onwards, there existed two Ba'ath parties – "the military Ba'ath Party and the Ba'ath Party, and real power lay with the former." He further noted that the military Ba'ath (as "paraphrased by Martin Seymour") "was and remains Ba'athist only in name; that it was and remains little more than a military clique with civilian hangers-on; and that from the initial founding of the Military Committee by disgruntled Syrian officers exiled in Cairo in 1959, the chain of events and the total corruption of Ba'athism proceeded with intolerable logic." Bitar agreed, stating that the 1966 coup "marked the end of Ba'athist politics in Syria." Aflaq shared the sentiment, and stated; "I no longer recognise my party!".

=== The new government ===
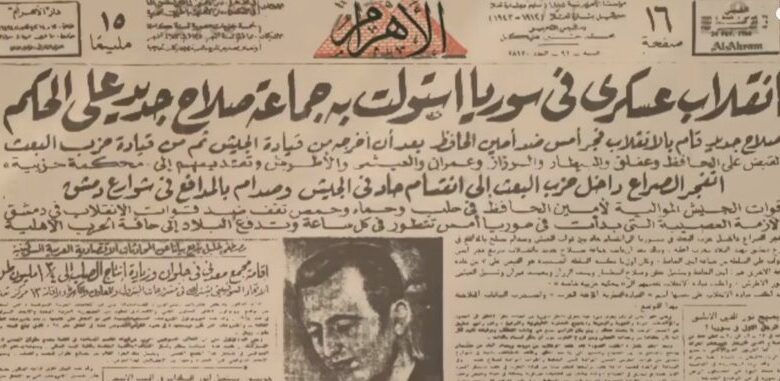
An Egyptian newspaper reports on the military coup that has taken place

Immediately after the coup, officers loyal to Umran and the Aflaqites were purged from the armed forces, being imprisoned alongside Umran at Mezze prison. One of the first acts of Jadid's government was to appoint Assad Minister of Defence. Assad however, did not support the coup, and told Mansur al-Atrash, Jubran Majdalani, and other Aflaqites that he did not support Jadid's actions. Later, in an interview with Le Monde, Assad claimed that the military's intervention was regrettable because the Ba'ath Party was democratic, and that the disputes should have been resolved in a democratic manner. However, Assad did view the actions as necessary, as it put an end, in his view, to the dictatorship of the National Command.

Jadid's government has been referred to as Syria's most radical government in history. He initiated rash and radical policies internally and externally, and tried to overturn Syrian society from the top to the bottom. Assad and Jadid did not agree on how to implement Ba'athist beliefs in practice. The Military Committee, which had been the officers' key decision-making process during 1963–66, lost its central institutional authority under Jadid because the fight against the Aflaqites was over – the key reason for the committee's existence in the first place. While Jadid never acquired, or took the offices of Prime Minister or President, instead opting to rule through the office of Assistant Secretary of the Regional Command, he was the undisputed ruler of Syria from 1966 to 1970. Before the 1966 coup, Jadid had controlled the Syrian armed forces through his post as Head of the Bureau of Officers' Affairs, but from 1966 onwards Jadid became absorbed with running the country, and in his place, Assad was given the task of controlling the armed forces. This would later prove to be a mistake, and lead to Jadid's downfall in the 1970 Corrective Revolution.

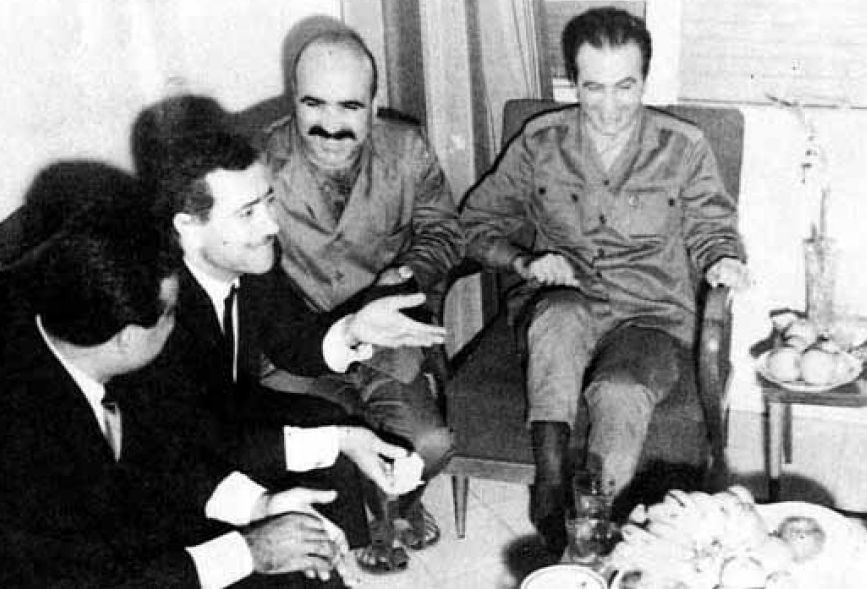
From left to right: Interior Minister Muhammad Rabah al-Tawil, Chief of Staff Mustafa Tlass, Commander of the Golan Front Ahmad al-Meer, and Salah Jadid

Jadid appointed Nureddin al-Atassi as president, Regional Secretary of the Regional Command and Secretary General of the National Command, Yusuf Zu'ayyin became Prime Minister again, and Brahim Makhous was appointed Minister of Foreign Affairs. Despite this, Jadid maintained effective control of the administration. Other personalities were former Head of Military Intelligence Ahmed Suidani, who was appointed Chief of Staff, Colonel Muhammad Rabah al-Tawil was appointed Minister of Labour and Head of the newly established Popular Resistance Forces, and Colonel Abd al-Karim al-Jundi, a founding member of the Military Committee, was appointed Minister of Agrarian Reform and later, Minister of Interior.

Salah Jadid's reign was characterized by extremely brutal repression, state terror, intensification of totalitarian measures, and imposition of hardline Marxist policies. The properties of traders, local businessmen and land owners were confiscated by Jadid's radical leftist regime, while the Syrian military forces became thoroughly politicized with neo-Ba'athist officers. In the sphere of foreign policy, the neo-Ba'athist government established close ties with the Soviet Union and began receiving large amounts of weaponry from the Soviet military.

=== Counter-coup attempt ===
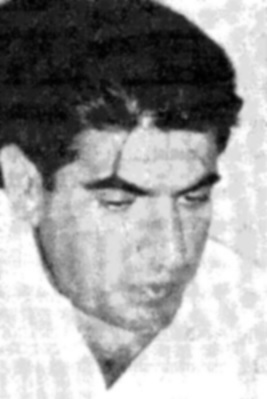
Druze officer Salim Hatum launched a counter-coup in 1966 to topple the regime of Salah Jadid and Hafez al-Assad

Druze officer Salim Hatum, who led the operations for the 1966 coup that arrested Syrian President Amin al-Hafiz, later plotted a counter-coup the same year, out of disenchanment with Hafez al-Assad and Salah Jadid. Although he was able to temporarily detain Salah Jadid, his plot was foiled by the military and he was forced to flee. After obtaining asylum in Jordan, Hatum criticised the sectarian character of the new regime and warned of a civil war in a press conference, stating:

"The situation in Syria was being threatened by a civil war as a result of the growth of the sectarian and tribal spirit, on the basis of which Salah Jadid and Hafiz al-Asad, as well as the groups surrounding them, ruled.. powerful places in the state and its institutions [are] limited to a specific class of the Syrian people [i.e. the Alawis]. Thus, the Alawis in the army have attained a ratio of five to one of all other religious communities ... whenever a Syrian military man is questioned about his free officers, his answer will be that they have been dismissed and driven away, and that only Alawi officers have remained. The Alawi officers adhere to their tribe and not to their militarism. Their concern is the protection of Salah Jadid and Hafiz al-Asad"

Hatum was later captured and killed by the neo-Ba'ath regime in 1967.

=== Intra-Ba'athist split ===
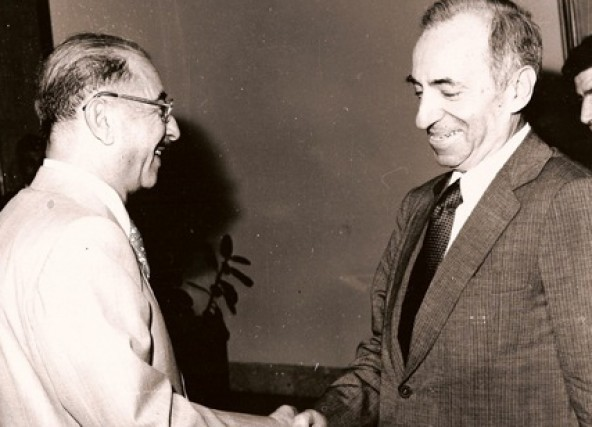
The coup caused the 1966 Ba'ath Party split; from 1968 until 2003 there existed two National Commands. In picture, from left to right Ahmed Hassan al-Bakr and Michel Aflaq

The ousting of Aflaq, Bitar, and the National Command became the deepest schism in the Ba'ath movement's history. While there had been many schisms and splits in the Ba'ath Party, Aflaq and Bitar always emerged as the victors, and remained party leaders; however, the 1966 coup brought a new generation of leaders to power who had different aims than their predecessors. While Aflaq and Bitar still had supporters in Syria and in non-Syrian Regional Branches, they were hampered by the lack of financial means – the Syrian Regional Branch had funded them since 1963. Jadid and his supporters now had the Syrian state at their disposal, and while theoretically able to establish new party organisations or coerce pro-Aflaq opinion, this failed to work since most of the regional branches changed their allegiance to Baghdad. Later in 1966, the first post-Aflaqite National Congress, officially designated the 9th, was held, and a new National Command was elected. Another change was to the ideological orientation of the Syrian Regional Branch and the new National Command; while the Aflaqites believed in an all-Arab Ba'ath Party and the unification of the Arab world, the Syria's new leaders saw this as impractical. Following the coup, the National Command became subservient in all but name to the Syrian Regional Command, and ceased to have an effective role in Arab or Syrian politics.

Following the exile of the National Command, some of its members, including Hafiz, convened the 9th Ba'ath National Congress (to differentiate it from the Syrian "9th National Congress") and elected a new National Command, with Aflaq, who did not attend the congress, as the National Command's Secretary General. For those like Bitar and Razzaz, the exile from Syria was too hard, and they left the party. Aflaq moved to Brazil, remaining there till 1968.

==== Party-to-party relations ====
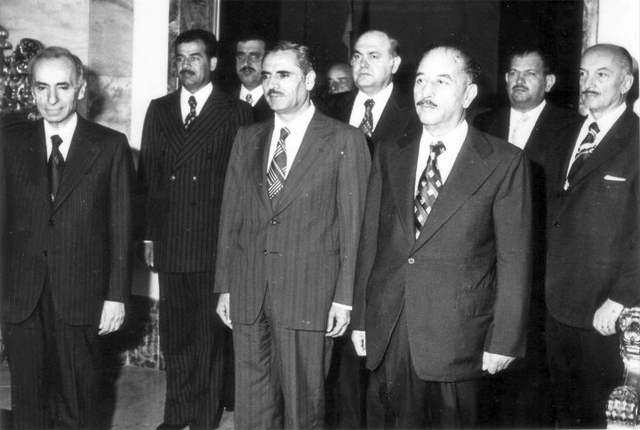
Members of the National Command of the Iraqi-dominated Arab Socialist Ba'th Party: from left to right Secretary General Michel Aflaq, Vice President of Iraq Saddam Hussein (second line), Assistant Secretary General Shibli al-Aysami (mid left) and President of Iraq Bakr (mid right) among others

When the National Command was toppled in 1966, the Iraqi Regional Branch remained, at least verbally, supportive of the "legitimate leadership" of Aflaq. When the Iraqi Regional Branch regained power in 1968 in the 17 July Revolution no attempts were made at a merger, to achieve their supposed goal of Arab unity, or reconciliation with the Syrian Ba'ath. After the establishment of Ba'ath rule in Iraq, many members of the Syrian-dominated Ba'ath movement defected to its Iraqi-counterpart, few if any Iraqi-loyal Ba'athists attempted to change its allegiance to Damascus. The reason for this was that those defecting from Damascus were loyal to the old, Aflaqite National Command. Several older members such as Bitar, Hafiz, Shibli al-Aysami and Elias Farah, either visited Iraq or sent a congratulatory message to Ahmed Hassan al-Bakr, the Regional Secretary of the Iraqi Regional Command. Aflaq did not visit Iraq until 1969, but from late 1970, he would become a leading Iraqi Ba'ath official, although he never acquired any decision-making power.

From the beginning, the Damascus government began an overwhelmingly anti-Iraqi Ba'athist propaganda campaign, to which their counterparts in Baghdad responded. However, the Iraqi Ba'athists helped Assad, who at the 4th Regional Congress of the Syrian Regional Branch called for the reunification of the Ba'ath Party in an attempt to seize power from Jadid. It was reported that Assad promised the Iraqis to recognize Aflaq's historical leadership. Iraq's foreign minister Abdul Karim al-Shaikhly even had his own personal office in the Syrian Ministry of Defence, which Assad headed. However, this should not be misconstrued, as the Iraqi Regional Branch was Arab nationalist in name only, and was in fact Iraqi nationalist.

The Syrian Regional Branch began denouncing Aflaq as a "thief". They claimed that he had stolen the Ba'athist ideology from Zaki al-Arsuzi and proclaimed it as his own, with Assad hailing Arsuzi as the principal founder of Ba'athist thought. The Iraqi Regional Branch, however, still proclaimed Aflaq as the founder of Ba'athism. Assad has referred to Arsuzi as the "greatest Syrian of his day" and claimed him to be the "first to conceive of the Ba'ath as a political movement." Bitar was sentenced to death "in absentia" in 1969, and Aflaq was condemned to death in absentia in 1971 by Assad's government. The Syrian Regional Branch erected a statue in Arsuzi's honour not long after the 1966 coup. Nevertheless, the majority of Ba'ath followers outside Syria still view Aflaq, not Arsuzi, as the principal founder of Ba'athism.

When the Iraqi Regional Branch seized power, the Syrian Regional Branch responded by not mentioning in the press release that a Ba'ath organisation had taken power in Iraq. For instance, it mentioned that Bakr had been appointed president, but did not mention his party's affiliation, and instead referred to the incident as a military coup. While the Syrian Ba'ath denied giving any legitimacy to Iraqi Ba'ath, the Iraqi Ba'ath were more conciliatory. For instance, Bakr stated "They are Ba'athists, we are Ba'athists" shortly after the Iraqi Regional Branch seized power. Foreign Minister Shaykli stated shortly after that "there is nothing preventing co-operation between us [meaning Iraq and Syria]". The anti-Iraq propaganda reached new heights within Syria at the same time that Assad was strengthening his position within the party and state. When Jadid was toppled by Assad during the Corrective Revolution in 1970, it did not signal a change in attitudes, and the first joint communique of the Syrian-dominated National Command and the Syrian Regional Command referred to the Iraqi Ba'ath as a "rightist clique".

== See also ==
- List of modern conflicts in the Middle East
  - Syrian Crisis of 1957
  - 1963 Syrian coup d'état (referred to as the "8th of March Revolution" in Ba'athist Syria)
  - 1970 Syrian coup d'etat (referred to as the "Corrective Movement" in Ba'athist Syria)
  - Syrian civil war
