= Elias Farah =

Syrian writer

Dr. Elias Farah
- Born: Elias Farah; 1 October 1927; Jisr al-Shughur, State of Syria
- Died: 6 December 2013 (aged 86); Dubai, UAE
- Education: Syrian University University of Geneva
- Political party: Arab Socialist Ba'ath Party
- Children: 4

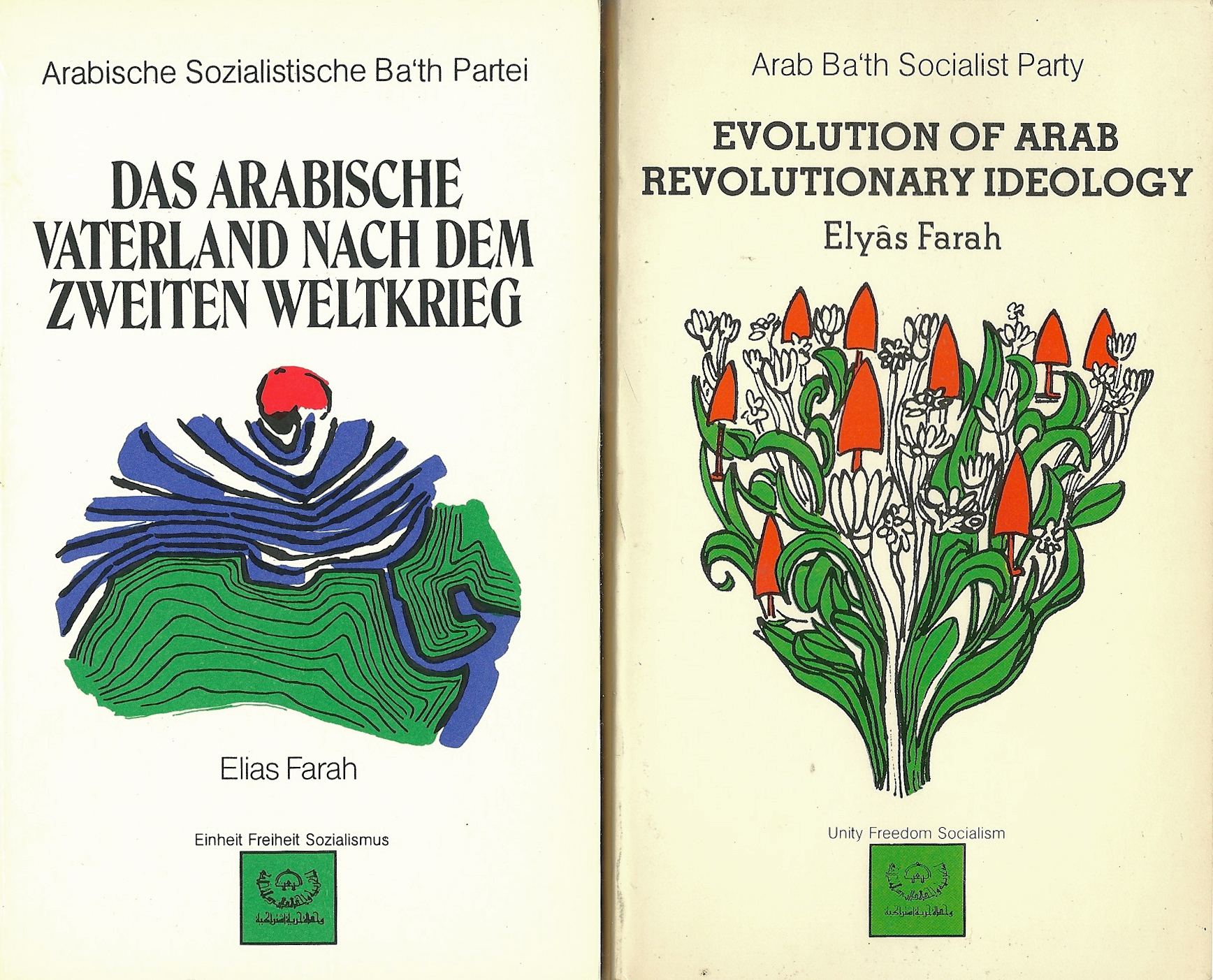
German version of Elias Farah's The Arab Homeland after World War II (printed in Italy, 1977) and Evolution of Arab Revolutionary Ideology (printed in Spain, 1978)

Elias Farah (1 October 1927 – 6 December 2013) was a Syrian writer who wrote several books about Arab nationalism and the subject of Arab thoughts and ideology, as advocated by the Ba’ath Party, many of which were translated to several languages. He served as the director of the Academy of the Arab Ba'ath Socialist Party in Baghdad.

== Early life and education ==
Elias Farah was born on 1 October 1927 in the city of Jisr al-Shughur. He came from a Christian Orthodox family and spent much of his early life in Aleppo. He graduated from Syrian University with a degree in literature, and afterwards, began his teaching career in Aleppo. Farah pursued his graduate studies at the University of Geneva in Switzerland, where he studied under professor Jean Piaget and earned a doctorate in education and psychology in 1964.

== Ba'ath Party ==
In 1947, Farah became a member of the Syrian Ba'ath Party. He was one of the closest companions of the party founder, Michel Aflaq. Farah left Syria after the 1966 Syrian coup d'état, which saw the military wing of the Ba'ath party, led by Salah Jadid and eventual Syrian president, Hafez al-Assad, overthrow the government of Amin al-Hafiz.

Farah fled to Lebanon and lived there for two years before later moving to Iraq, where he continued his work in the Ba'ath Party. As Aflaq's age advanced, he withdrew more from party work, and from 1978 onwards, Farah was given the reigns to decide the ideological orientation of the party. After a three-year period of vacancy following Aflaq's death in 1989, Iraqi President Saddam Hussein became the new general secretary of the Ba'ath Party and appointed Farah as the director of the Academy of the Arab Ba'ath Socialist Party in Baghdad.

== Later life and death ==
The 2003 Invasion of Iraq coupled with deteriorating health led Farah to return to his native Syria, where he settled in the capital of Damascus. Due to the civil war in Syria, Farah moved to Dubai in April 2013. There, he died just a few months later on 6 December 2013 at the age of 86.

== Works ==
- Arab World after the Second World War, (Beirut, 1975)
