= Munif Razzaz =

Syrian politician (1919–1984)

Munif al-Razzaz
- منيف الرزاز
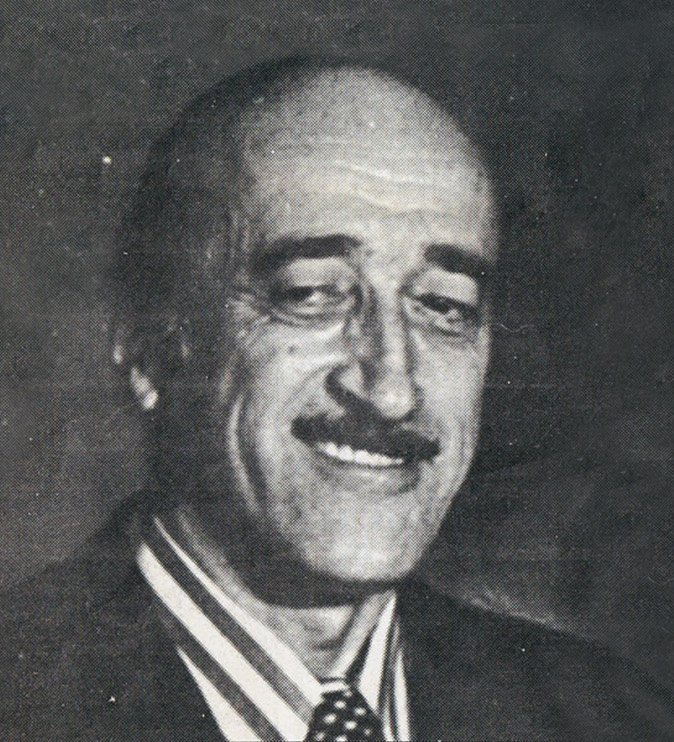

Secretary General of the National Command of the Arab Socialist Ba'ath Party
- In office April 1965 – 23 February 1966
- Deputy: Shibli al-Aisami
- Preceded by: Michel Aflaq
- Succeeded by: Michel Aflaq (Iraqi-led); Nureddin al-Atassi (Syrian-led)

Regional Secretary of the Regional Command of the Jordanian Regional Branch
- In office September 1959 – April 1965
- Preceded by: Abdullah Rimawi
- Succeeded by: Abd al-Ghani Musa al-Nahar

Member of the National Command of the Arab Socialist Ba'ath Party
- In office 6 April 1947 – 23 February 1966

Member of the Regional Command of the Jordanian Regional Branch
- In office 1952 – April 1965

Personal details
- Born: 19 December 1919 Damascus, Syria
- Died: 16 September 1984 (aged 64) Baghdad, Ba'athist Iraq
- Party: Jordanian Regional Branch of the Arab Socialist Ba'ath Party
- Spouse: Lamah Bseiso
- Children: Mu'nis Razzaz, Omar Razzaz, Zeina Razzaz

Munif al-Razzaz (Arabic: منيف الرزاز; 19 December 1919 – 16 September 1984) was a Jordanian-Syrian physician and politician who was the second, and last, Secretary General of the (unified) National Command of the Arab Socialist Ba'ath Party, having been elected to the post at the 8th National Congress held in April 1965.

Munif relocated to Iraq in 1977 and became a leading member of the Iraqi Ba'ath. Munif was among dozens of dissidents accused of plotting against then new Iraqi President Saddam Hussein in the 1979 Ba'ath Party Purge. King Hussein had advocated for Munif's release so he can return safely to Jordan, but President Saddam Hussein adamantly refused. Munif died in 1984 during his house arrest in Baghdad. His wife and doctor claimed that he was poisoned after his medication for high blood pressure medicine was replaced. He was buried in Amman according to his only will.

== Biography ==
=== Early years ===
Razzaz was born in Damascus, Syria on 19 December 1919, but he was raised in Jordan. His family moved to Jordan in 1925 after his father, a veterinarian, was accused by the French colonial authorities in Syria of collaborating with the rebels during the Great Syrian Revolt by treating their injured horses. In 1937 Razzaz was given scholarship at the American University in Beirut after having spent a brief period studying in Cairo. He became a member of the Jordanian Regional Branch of the Arab Socialist Ba'ath Party in 1950. Razzaz was one of the co-founders of the Ba'athist Regional Branch in Jordan, and he promoted the Ba'athist ideology through his writings in national newspapers. From 1955 to 1957, the Jordanian Ba'athists were loud critics of King Hussein. Razzaz criticized the King Hussein's support of the Baghdad Pact, and his stance towards Gamal Abdel Nasser, the President of Egypt. Because of his anti-monarchy activities Razzaz was imprisoned in 1956, 1958, 1959 and 1960.

In the aftermath of the Ramadan Revolution which brought the Iraqi Ba'ath Branch to power in Iraq, Razzaz along with fellow Ba'athist Abdallah Abd al-Da'im, was given the task of formulating a political program which was supposed to be broadcast to the Iraqi people.

=== National Command ===
Razzaz was elected Secretary General of the National Command at the 8th National Congress in April 1965, and succeeded Michel Aflaq in office. However, Razzaz was not rooted enough in Syrian affairs to find a solution to the crisis which was taking hold in Syria. In November 1965, the National Command passed a resolution which forbade the Syrian Regional Command to appoint or relieve officers. The Military Committee led by Salah Jadid responded immediately by rebelling. Razzaz then convened an emergency session of the National Command which decreed the dissolution of Yusuf Zu'ayyin's government and the Syrian Regional Command, while they decreed the establishment of a new leadership for Syria; al-Bittar became Prime Minister, Muhammad Umran became Minister of Defense, Amin al-Hafiz became Chairman of a new Presidential Council, and Mansur al-Atrash became Chairman of the National Revolutionary Council. Jadid and his supporters replied by carrying out the 1966 Syrian coup d'état which led to the downfall of the National Command and the moderate faction within the Ba'ath Party.

=== Later years ===
Following the downfall of Aflaq, Salah al-Din al-Bitar and the moderates in general in the 1966 coup, Razzaz went underground. He became the only member of the old National Command to put up any resistance against Jadid's neo-Ba'athist government. On his ascension to office, Razzaz relationship with Aflaq deteriorated even if it was the Military Committee, and not Razzaz, who forced him from office.

Shortly after the 1966 coup, Colonel Salim Hatum began planning a conspiracy which would topple the Jadid government. Hatum forged an alliance with Razzaz, encouraged by messages from comrades from the old National Command, began recruiting military officers to his cause. He managed to form a Military Committee led by Druze officer Major General Fahd al-Sha'ir. The coup was uncovered by the authorities in August 1966, and Razzaz and fellow conspirators were forced either into hiding or into Lebanon. Razzaz was highly critical of the Syrian regime of Hafez al Assad, writing an exposure book, Al Tajribah al Murrah The Bitter Experience, published in 1966. He became a member of the Palestinian Iraqi-aligned Ba'athist organization Arab Liberation Front in 1966, and through it, rose through the Iraqi-dominated Ba'athist structure.

In 1977, Munif relocated to Iraq and became a leading member of the Iraqi Ba'ath. He was among dozens of dissidents accused of plotting against then new Iraqi President Saddam Hussein in the 1979 Ba'ath Party Purge. King Hussein had advocated for Munif's release so he can return safely to Jordan, but President Saddam Hussein adamantly refused. Munif died in 1984. His wife and doctor claimed that he was poisoned after the medication he was taking for high blood pressure was replaced with poison. He puked blood in front of his wife and daughter.

== Thought ==
In the article "Ba'ath Socialism" in the Iraqi newspaper Iraq Today, Razzaz stated that Ba'athist socialism was scientific socialism, and that it "was the natural and inevitable response to the contradictions between the Arab nation and home land, with colonialism, imperialism and backwardness, both inherited and recent. It is a natural response to natural struggle blended with class struggle." Razzaz laid emphasis on the fact that Ba'athist socialism was both scientific and moral, and that Ba'athist socialism was a form of Third World Socialism and not the form of socialism of the First, Second, Third or Fourth Internationals. These forms of socialism derived "their character from pure class contradictions inside imperialist industrialized societies. It is a socialism which draws its basic properties from the contradictions of the Third World with imperialism on the one hand, and backwardness on the other". Ba'athist socialism, in his mind, opposed full state ownership of the economy, but supported state ownership over the heights of the economy. In his influential 1957 article "Why Socialism Now?" Razzaz states; "Socialism is a way of life, not just an economic order. It extends to all aspects of life – economics, politics, training, education, social life, health, morals, literature, science, history, and others both great and small. Socialism, freedom and unity are not different names for different things … but different facets of one basic law from which they spring." Together with Aflaq and Jamal al-Atassi, Razzaz wrote Articles on Socialism in 1974.

In a paper entitled "Arab nationalism" Razzaz asserts that Arab nationalist ideology is "the driving force behind the Arabs in their struggle to create a progressive nation that can hold on its own with the nations of the world." Razzaz believed that the Arabs had a sense of belonging to an Arab identity which could be traced back to pre-Islamic days. He believed that the Arab world was first confronted by Western colonialism at the beginning of the 16th century in the Persian Gulf and the Indian Ocean. The 1948 Arab–Israeli War "which brought the humiliating defeat of the Arabs by a handful of Jews, was the last straw that destroyed any remnants of confidence between the ruling classes on one side and the masses on the other." Resentments towards the Western powers for creating Israel could never be forgotten Razzaz believed, and the creation of Israel led to the popular demand of an end to all Western tutelage in the Arab world. Razzaz claimed that Arab nationalism was the conflict between two forces; the reactionary classes and the masses. The reactionary classes were inefficient vassals of Western capitalist imperialism who had betrayed the nation, while the masses were "anti-imperialist, anti-capitalist and anti-Zionist, and in favor of unity, freedom, socialism and neutralism."

== Personal life ==
In 1949, he married Lam'a Bseisso, who was born in Hama, Syria in 1923, with whom he had two sons and one daughter. His son Omar Razzaz was the Prime Minister of Jordan from 2018 to 2020.
