= Ahmed Suwaydani =

Syrian soldier and politician

Major General Ahmad Suwaydani
- أحمد سويداني

Chief of the General Staff of the Armed Forces
- In office February 1966 – February 1968

Head of Bureau of Military Personnel
- In office 1965–1966

Chief of Military Intelligence
- In office 1963–1965

Personal details
- Born: 1932 Nawa, Izra District, French Mandate of Syria
- Died: 1994 (aged 61–62) Nawa, Syria
- Party: Ba'ath Party
- Education: Homs Military Academy

Military service
- Allegiance: Second Syrian Republic (early 1950s–1958); United Arab Republic (1958–1961); Second Syrian Republic (1961–1963); Ba'athist Syria (1963–1968)
- Branch/service: Syrian Army
- Years of service: early 1950s–1968
- Rank: Major General
- Battles/wars: Six-Day War

Ahmad al-Suwaydani (Note: His name is also transliterated Ahmed Suidani) (Arabic: أحمد سويداني; 1932–1994) was a Syrian military officer who served the chief of staff of the Syrian Armed Forces from 1966 to 1968. He was best known for uncovering Israeli spy Eli Cohen’s espionage plans and activities in Syria during the 1960s. Prior to his position, he had served as chief of the Syrian Military Intelligence from 1963 to 1965 and the head of the Bureau of Military Personnel from 1965 to 1966. al-Suwaydani was dismissed and imprisoned for suspicions of plotting a coup d'état in 1968. In 1994, after serving 25 years in imprisonment, he was released and died shortly after.

== Early life ==
Suwaydani was born in 1932 in Nawa. He belonged to the Bani Suwaydan, a Sunni Muslim clan of the Hauran. In the 17th century, before the town of al-Suwayda had become a predominantly Druze center, the headmen of the town often hailed from the Bani Suwaydan. Suwaydani's father was a peasant, though relatively better off than most of the peasants of Nawa and a member of the village's notable class.

== Military career ==
Suwaydani graduated from the Homs Military Academy and joined the Ba'ath Party. In 1963–1965, he served as the chief of the military intelligence directorate. During this time he helped finance and provide arms to the Palestinian armed movement Fatah, cooperating particularly with Yasser Arafat and Salah Khalaf (Abu Iyad).

In 1965 he also became head of the bureau of military personnel. He became closely allied with President Amin al-Hafiz and Chief of Staff Salah Jadid. Suwaydani participated in the 1966 Syrian coup d'etat which installed Nureddin al-Atassi as president with Jadid effectively as the country's strongman. Suwaydani was then promoted to the rank of major-general and appointed by Jadid as chief of staff. He held this post during Syria's defeat by Israel in the Six Day War of 1967. Suwaydani blamed Defense Minister Hafez al-Assad for the loss of the Golan Heights to Israeli forces, and a quarrel erupted within the Syrian high command. Suwaydani penned a report denouncing Assad, but the latter countered with allegations that Suwaydani was fomenting a coup in collaboration with some 100 officers from the Hauran. As a result of Assad's and Jadid's suspicions, Jadid dismissed Suwaydani on 15 February 1968.

== Arrest and imprisonment ==
During a flight Suwaydani was taking from Baghdad to Cairo on 11 July 1969, his plane was forced to take an emergency landing by the Syrian authorities in Damascus, whereupon he was arrested. Afterward, all his loyalists from the Hauran were dismissed from the officer corps. He remained imprisoned through most of the presidency of Hafez al-Assad until his release in February 1994. Soon after his release, in the same year, he died in his hometown.

== Media depictions ==
Ahmed Suwaydani was portrayed by Alexander Siddig in the Netflix TV series The Spy.

== Bibliography ==
- Batatu, Hanna (1999). Syria's Peasantry, the Descendants of Its Lesser Rural Notables, and Their Politics. Princeton University Press. ISBN 0691002541.
- Khatib, Lina (2011). Islamic Revivalism in Syria: The Rise and Fall of Ba'thist Secularism. Abingdon and New York: Routledge. ISBN 978-0-415-78203-6.
- Moubayed, Sami M. (2006). Steel & Silk: Men and Women who Shaped Syria 1900-2000. Cune Press. ISBN 9781885942401.
