= The Spy (miniseries) =

French television miniseries

- Genre: Drama; Espionage thriller
- Created by: Gideon Raff
- Based on: L'espion qui venait d'Israël by: Uri Dan; Yeshayahu Ben Porat
- Directed by: Gideon Raff
- Starring: Sacha Baron Cohen; Noah Emmerich
- Music by: Guillaume Roussel
- Original language: English
- No. of episodes: 6

Production
- Executive producers: Gideon Raff; Sacha Baron Cohen
- Producer: Alain Goldman
- Running time: 47–62 minutes
- Production companies: Legende Films; Canal+ Netflix

Original release
- Network: OCS (France); Netflix (international)
- Release: 6 September 2019

The Spy is a French English-language espionage television miniseries, created and directed by Gideon Raff, based on the life of Israel's top Mossad spy Eli Cohen, who is portrayed by Sacha Baron Cohen (no relation). The series is a production by French company Légende Entreprises for Canal+ and Netflix. OCS is airing the show in France and Netflix is streaming the show internationally outside France. The six-episode miniseries, released on September 6, 2019, on Netflix, was inspired by real-life events. It is based on the book L'espion qui venait d'Israël (English: The Spy Who Came from Israel), written by Uri Dan and Yeshayahu Ben Porat.

The series has received "generally favorable reviews" according to Metacritic, with Baron Cohen's performance being praised. However, the series has been criticized for lapses in historical accuracy. There is no independent verification about whom Cohen met with in the Syrian elite while working undercover in Buenos Aires or Damascus. At the 77th Golden Globe Awards, Baron Cohen received a nomination for Best Actor – Miniseries or Television Film.

The series was mainly filmed in Casablanca.

== Plot ==
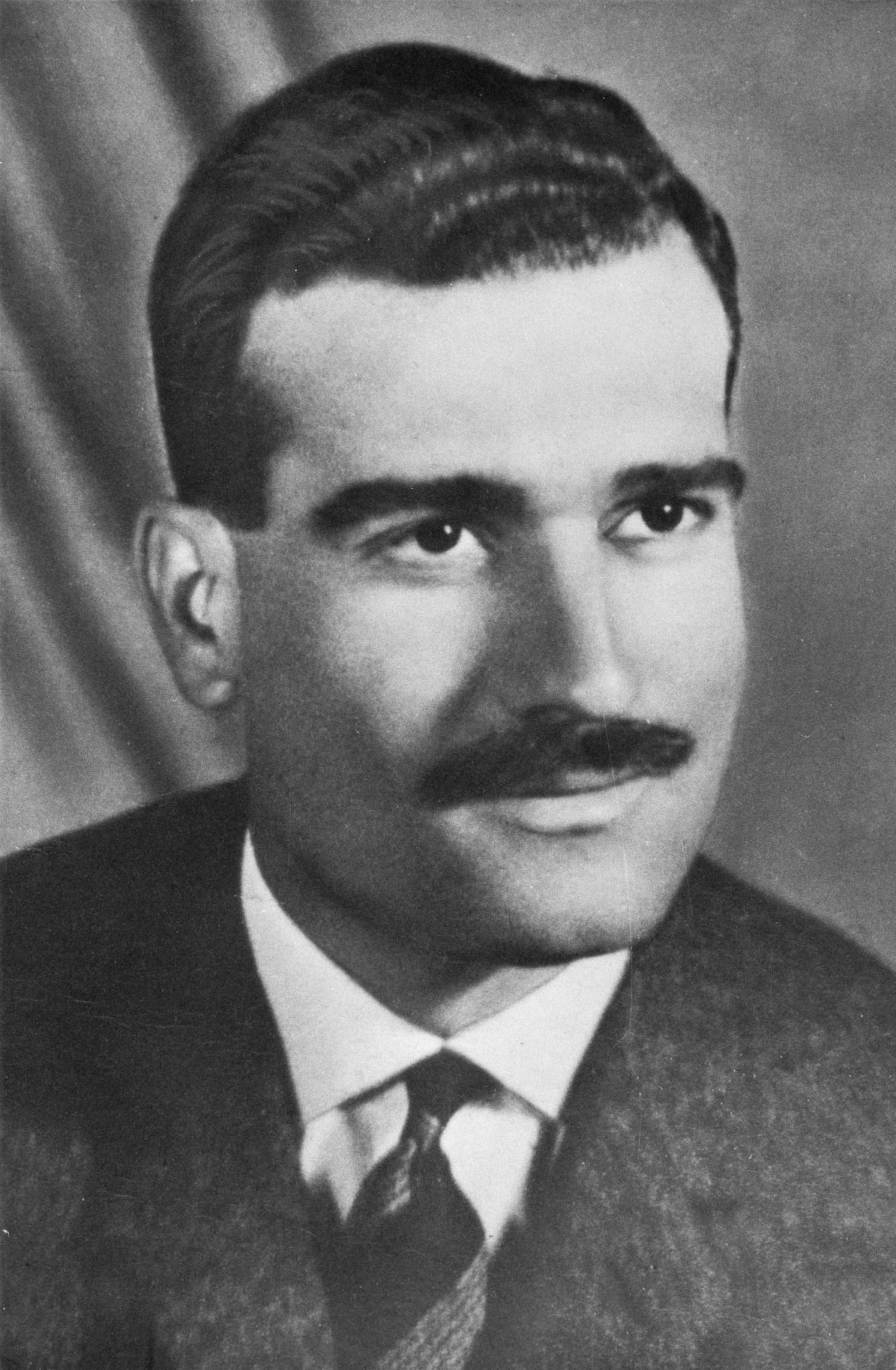
The real-life Eli Cohen

The miniseries follows the exploits of Eli Cohen, a Mossad spy. The story takes place during the years leading to the 1967 Six-Day War between Israel and Syria. It follows Cohen's recruitment into Mossad after previously being rejected twice, to his infiltration of the Syrian government. He assumes the identity of Kamel Amin Thaabet and establishes himself in Syrian high society, first in Buenos Aires, then in Damascus. After having befriended people who would eventually take over Syria, Cohen is appointed as the country's Deputy Defense Minister and becomes a close confidant to the future president, Amin al-Hafiz, before his cover is blown and he is publicly executed.

== Cast ==
- Sacha Baron Cohen as Eli Cohen / Kamel Amin Thaabet
- Hadar Ratzon-Rotem as Nadia Cohen, Eli's wife
- Yael Eitan as Maya
- Noah Emmerich as Dan Peleg
- Nassim Lyes as Ma'azi Zahreddine
- Moni Moshonov as Jacob Shimoni
- Alona Tal as Julia Schneider
- Mourad Zaoui as Benny
- Alexander Siddig as Ahmed Suwaydani
- Marc Maurille as IDF sergeant
- Waleed Zuaiter as General Amin al-Hafiz
- Stanley Townsend as General Abdul Karim Zahreddine
- Arié Elmaleh as Michel Aflaq
- Hassam Ghancy as Colonel Salim Hatum
- Uri Gavriel as sheikh Majid al-Ard
- Tim Seyfi as Mohammed bin Laden
- Souad Faress as Sophie Cohen, Eli's mother
- Ori Pfeffer as Arik

== Episodes ==
No.	Title	Directed by	Written by	Original release date
1	"The Immigrant"	Gideon Raff	Gideon Raff	September 6, 2019
Eliahu Cohen, a department store employee, is recruited by Mossad for a covert mission in Syria. He assumes the identity of Kamel Amin Thaabet and begins his training. Eli's wife, Nadia, becomes suspicious of his actions but eventually supports him. Eli arrives in Buenos Aires and immerses himself in his new identity, building relationships within the Arab community. As tensions escalate between Israel and Syria, Eli's mission gains urgency. He undergoes surveillance and testing to prove his abilities. Despite the risks, Eli remains dedicated to his mission.
2	"What's New, Buenos Aires?"	Gideon Raff	Gideon Raff	September 6, 2019
In Argentina to establish a cover, Cohen masquerades as Kamel Amin Thaabeth, an unmarried import-exporter of Syrian descent and socializes with Syrian businessmen. Cohen is supported in Buenos Aires by Julia, a female agent who gets Cohen an invitation to a party at the Syrian embassy. Through local Syrian contacts, Cohen is introduced to a high-ranking diplomat and future potential Syrian leader, General Amin al-Hafiz. Seeing classified documents on General al-Hafiz's desk, Cohen instinctively breaks in to the office to photograph the documents. Cohen and Julia fight and kill a Syrian bodyguard who was tracking him. Peleg reports to Shimoni that Cohen is too impulsive and should be recalled, but Shimoni likes the positive operational reports and overrules Peleg. Against orders to go to the Syrian embassy, Cohen delivers gifts to the General and his wife, and obtains a necessary letter of recommendation for entry into Syria. After Nadia gives birth to Sophie, Eli returns to Israel and expresses reservation about continuing the operation.
3	"Alone in Damascus"	Gideon Raff	Gideon Raff	September 6, 2019
Cohen resumes the operation and receives espionage equipment from his handlers in Zurich. En route to Syria, he befriends Sheik Majid al-Ard who unknowingly helps him enter the country. Cohen finds an apartment near the Second Bureau in Damascus. Shimoni and the Mossad team are thrilled to have landed an agent in Damascus, as Cohen builds up his business cover. Using his import-export business as a front, he quickly begins to deliver valuable intel back to Israel. Peleg is concerned about getting Cohen back alive as Peleg expresses remorse for a star agent he lost in Jordan, who had similar qualities to Cohen. Cohen befriends Ma'azi Zaher al-Din, nephew of the commander-in-chief of the Syrian Army. Back in Israel, Nadia struggles with loneliness without Eli.
4	"The Odd Couples"	Gideon Raff	Gideon Raff & Max Perry	September 6, 2019
Cohen joins a street rally to celebrate a Syrian victory against the Israelis at the Golan Heights, but is told later by Ma'azi that the victory announcement was propaganda as the Syrians were defeated in their own surprise attack. Cohen and Ma'azi visit a Syrian military zone and meet Colonel Sharif Hatoum, local commander of the Syrian defense. Colonel Hatoum gives Cohen a tour of the hidden underground bunkers at the Golan Heights, overlooking Lake Tiberias. In Israel, Nadia has trouble coping with the challenges of single parenthood. Cohen grows closer to Ma'azi and Cohen is introduced to Ma'azi's uncle, General Ad-Din. Overhearing an imminent attack, Cohen covertly sends a message to the Israel Defense Forces through contact with a farmer at the border, while evading Syrian soldiers. Peleg devotes so much time helping Nadia she begins to doubt his motives. Back in Damascus, Cohen sends information about the Syrian military capabilities to Israel. He is taken to a secret location where he meets Michel Aflaq, leader of the Ba'ath Movement and his earlier contact from Argentina, General Amin al-Hafiz.
5	"Fish Gotta Swim"	Gideon Raff	Gideon Raff & Max Perry	September 6, 2019
Instructed by General al-Hafiz, Cohen invites General Ad-Din to a lavish party at Cohen's apartment, which becomes a cover for General al-Hafiz to successfully conduct a bloody coup d'etat of President Nazim al-Qudsi. After General al-Hafiz assumes power, Cohen attends several social events with high-ranking Syrian leadership. Cohen passes photos to Mossad of General al-Hafiz talking to Mohammed bin Laden. Following orders from Peleg, Cohen asks George Seif, the new Minister of Information, about bin Laden. General al-Hafiz arranges for Cohen to talk with bin Laden, who asks Cohen for help smuggling unspecified equipment into Syria. Eli and Nadia struggle with their separate lives. Suidani catches Cohen in George Seif's office and brings him to General al-Hafiz's office, where General al-Hafiz asks Cohen to be the Deputy Minister of Defense.
6	"Home"	Gideon Raff	Gideon Raff & Max Perry	September 6, 2019
Nadia talks with an official at the Syrian embassy in Paris after travelling there with Peleg to plead for Cohen's life. Months earlier, Cohen makes a secret visit home and meets his children for the first time. Eli's brother Maurice pleads for Eli to quit and stay home. Cohen struggles with returning to civilian life in Israel, the anxiety of managing his contrasting dual personalities and the possibility that he will have to return to Syria for an indefinite period. A high level Prime Ministerial meeting with the Ministry of Defense and Mossad discuss a plan to attack Syria's water diversion operation and discuss the benefits of having an agent as Deputy Minister of Defense. Returning to Syria, he accepts the position as Deputy Minister of Defense, but aided by Soviet counterespionage Suidani catches Cohen in the act of sending messages to Israel. Despite international pleas for leniency, he is publicly executed in Marjeh Square. Pre-credit text suggests that Cohen's intelligence helped shorten the Six Day War in 1967.

== Production ==
The show was filmed in Morocco, Hungary, and the UK. Filming was said to not be possible in Syria due to the Syrian Civil War.

== Reception ==
On Rotten Tomatoes, the series holds an 86% approval rating based on 43 reviews, with an average rating of 6.97/10. The site's critics consensus reads, "Though at times stodgy, The Spy's exploration of a real-life spy remains engaging thanks to a moving performance from Sacha Baron Cohen." On Metacritic, it has a weighted average score of 68 out of 100 based on 16 critic reviews, indicating "generally favorable reviews".

Nick Allen of rogerebert.com gave the series 3 out of 4 stars, largely praising the excitement the series builds and that it adds a new dimension to the spy genre. Allen writes, "...by the end of episode one, “The Spy” takes off as Eli transforms into Kamel while delivering a monologue to the camera—Kamel's life story—and the series casts a spell, showing a chameleonic actor playing a chameleonic character."

Sacha Baron Cohen's performance has been well received. Rolling Stone's Alan Sepinwall writes, "Baron Cohen couldn’t have found a role more well suited to his gifts and career to date. The Spy is a thriller played entirely straight, but it also feels like Baron Cohen’s persona with vastly higher stakes."

== Historical accuracy ==
Analysts have noted questions of historical accuracy of some of the events presented. According to former Syrian President Amin al-Hafiz, he never met Cohen in Argentina, much less befriended him, and the office of "Deputy Defense Minister" did not even exist in Syria at the time. The position of Chief Advisor to the defense minister did exist – a position in which Cohen claimed to have served.
