= Eli Cohen =

Egyptian-born Israeli spy (1924–1965)

Eli Cohen אֵלִי כֹּהֵן
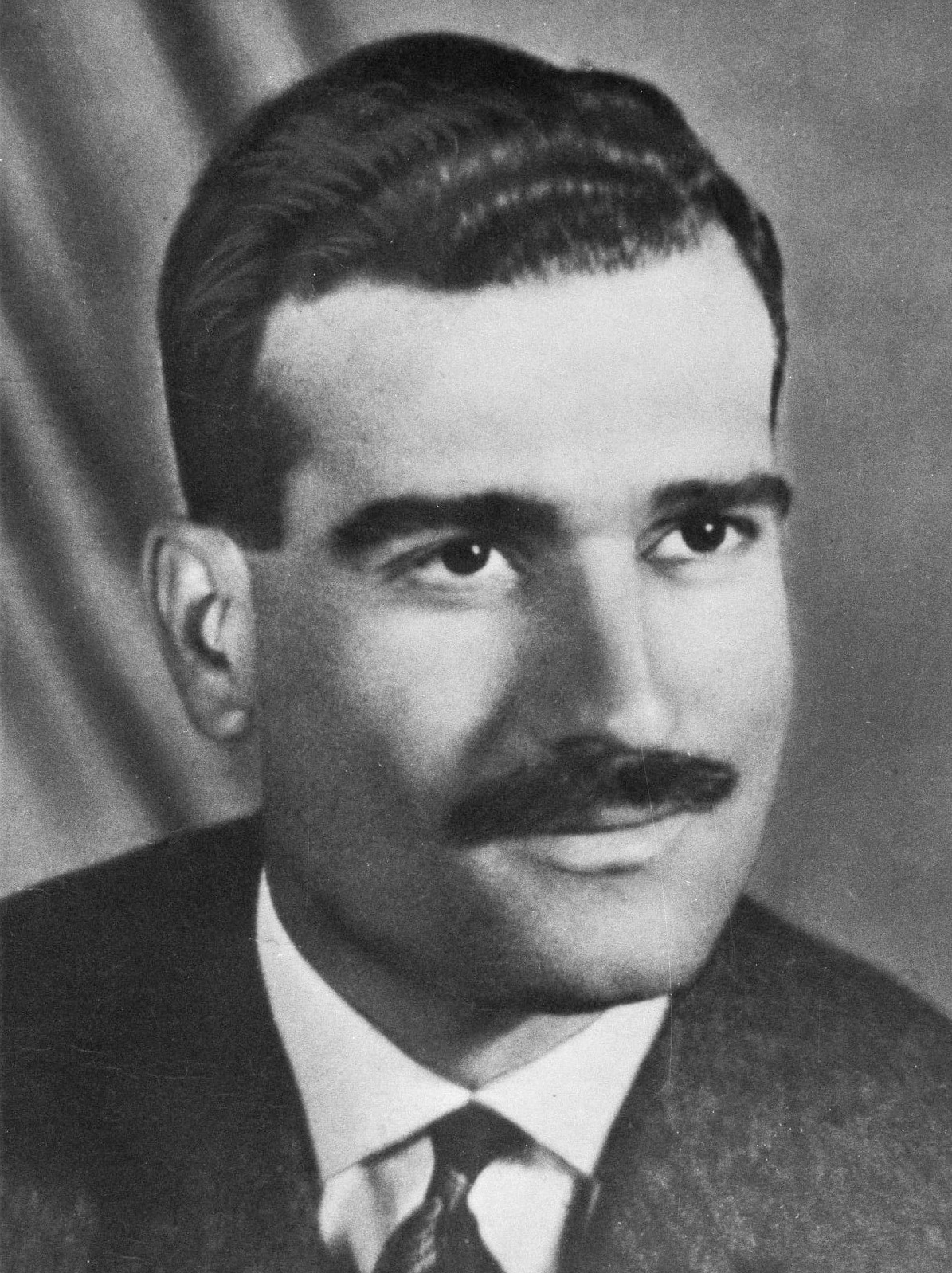
- Cohen in 1959
- Born: Eliyahu Ben-Shaul Cohen; 6 December 1924; Alexandria, Egypt
- Died: 18 May 1965 (aged 40); Damascus, Syria
- Cause of death: Execution by hanging
- Spouse: Nadia Majald (m. 1959)
- Children: 3
- Espionage activity
- Allegiance: Israel
- Agency: Mossad
- Service years: 1961–1965
- Alias: Kamel Amin Thabet (كامل أمين ثابت)

Eliyahu Ben-Shaul Cohen (Hebrew: אֱלִיָּהוּ בֵּן שָׁאוּל כֹּהֵן, romanized: ʾEliyāhū ben Šāʾūl kōhēn; Arabic: إيلياهو بن شاؤول كوهين, romanized: Īliyāhū bin Shāʾūl Kūhīn; 26 December 1924 – 18 May 1965) was an Egyptian-born Israeli spy. He is best known for his espionage work in Syria between 1961 and 1965, where he developed close relationships with the Syrian political and military hierarchy.

Though he was initially successful, Cohen's activity became increasingly risky and he expressed a sense of impending danger to Mossad in 1964. A year later, his true allegiance was uncovered by the Syrian Military Intelligence Directorate and he was convicted by the Syrian government under pre-war martial law. After being sentenced to death, he was publicly hanged in Damascus in May 1965. The incident contributed to the sharp escalation of hostilities between Israel and Syria just before the 1967 Arab–Israeli War.

Cohen is highly regarded in Israel, with several streets and roads being named after him.

== Early life ==
Cohen was born in Alexandria, Egypt, to a Syrian-Jewish family. His father had immigrated from Aleppo in the Ottoman Empire in 1914. Deeply committed to Judaism, Cohen had planned in his youth to become a rabbi with guidance from Alexandria's Chief Rabbi Moise Ventura, but the city's yeshiva soon closed down, prompting him to pursue higher education at Cairo University. A staunch Zionist, he helped Israel evacuate the Egyptian Jewish community by assisting Israeli intelligence throughout Egypt. He was also fluent in five languages: Arabic, Hebrew, English, French, and Spanish.

At the onset of the Jewish exodus from the Muslim world, which began concurrently with the Arab–Israeli conflict, Cohen's parents and three brothers immigrated to Israel in 1949, but he stayed behind to complete his degree and also to help consolidate Zionist efforts among Egypt's Jewish community. Prior to the 1952 Egyptian revolution, he was arrested and interrogated by Egyptian authorities, who were becoming suspicious of his activities.

Nonetheless, he continued to engage in various Israeli covert efforts in Egypt throughout the 1950s, although the Egyptian government could never prove his involvement in Operation Goshen, by which the Israeli government smuggled a significant number of Egypt's Jews out of the country and resettled them in Israel. Cohen is also said to have aided Egyptian Jews who were taking part in what would become known as the Lavon Affair, by which Israel sought to sabotage Egypt's relationship with the Western world. Two members of the spy ring were caught and sentenced to death, but the Egyptian government was unable to find a link between Cohen and the perpetrators.

By December 1956, just after the Suez Crisis, he was forced to leave Egypt; his immigration to Israel was facilitated by the Jewish Agency. In 1959, he married Nadia Majald (born c. 1935), an Iraqi-born Jew with whom he would have three children (Sophie, Irit, and Shai) after settling down in Bat Yam. Through this marriage, Cohen became the brother-in-law of Israeli author Sami Michael.

== Enlistment with Mossad ==
The Israel Defense Forces recruited him in 1957 and placed him in military intelligence, where he became a counter-intelligence analyst and a translator. His work bored him and he attempted to join the Mossad, but he was offended when the Mossad rejected him, and he resigned from military counter-intelligence. For the next two years, he worked as a filing clerk in a Tel Aviv insurance office.

The Mossad recruited Cohen after Director-General Meir Amit, looking for an intelligence officer to infiltrate the Syrian government, came across his name while looking through the agency's files of rejected candidates, after none of the current candidates seemed suitable for the job. For two weeks Cohen was put under surveillance and was judged suitable for recruitment and training. Cohen was then informed that Mossad had decided to recruit him and underwent an intensive six-month course at the Mossad training school. His graduate report stated that he had all the qualities needed to become a katsa, or field agent.

== Espionage in Syria ==
Cohen was then given a false identity as a Syrian businessman who was returning to the country after living in Argentina. To establish his cover, Cohen moved to Buenos Aires in 1961. In Buenos Aires he moved among the Arab community, letting it be known he had large amounts of money to put at the disposal of the Syrian Ba'ath Party. At this time the Ba'ath Party was illegal in Syria but the party seized power in 1963.

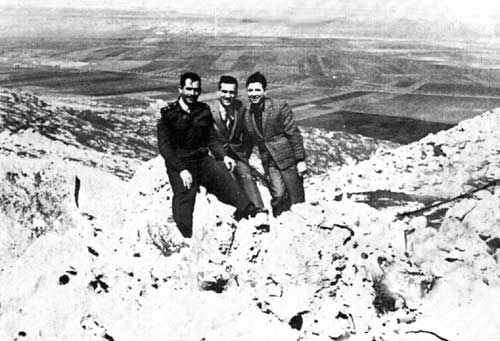
Cohen (center) at the Golan Heights

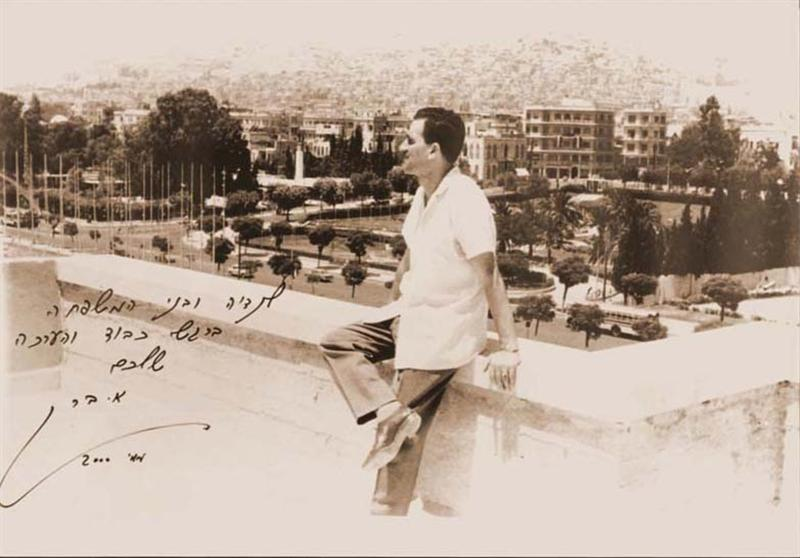
Cohen at his Damascus home in 1963

Cohen moved to Damascus in February 1962 under the alias Kamel Amin Thabet (Arabic: كامل أمين ثابت) and lived in Al Mahdi Ibn Barakeh Street of the Abu Rummaneh neighbourhood, an area which contained various embassies and government buildings, including the Air Force Intelligence Directorate. Mossad had carefully planned the tactics that he was to use in building relationships with high-ranking Syrian politicians, military officials, influential public figures, and the diplomatic community.

Cohen continued his social life as he had in Argentina, spending time in cafes listening to political gossip. He also held parties at his home for high-placed Syrian ministers, businessmen, and others. At these parties, Cohen "dispensed free-flowing liquor and prostitutes" and highly-placed officials would openly discuss their work and army plans. Cohen would pretend to be drunk to encourage such conversations, to which he paid close attention. He would also lend money to government officials, and many came to him for advice. Cohen was so ingrained in the Syrian elite that he was on the short list for deputy minister of defense right before his arrest.

Cohen provided an extensive amount and wide range of intelligence data for the Israeli Army between 1961 and 1965. He sent intelligence to Israel by radio, secret letters, and occasionally in person; he secretly travelled to Israel three times. His most famous achievement was the tour of the Golan Heights in which he collected intelligence on the Syrian fortifications there. According to an unconfirmed story, he feigned sympathy for the soldiers exposed to the sun and had trees planted at every position, placed to provide shade. The Israel Defense Forces were alleged to have used the trees as targeting markers during the Six-Day War, which enabled Israel to capture the Golan Heights in two days. Cohen made repeated visits to the southern frontier zone, providing photographs and sketches of Syrian positions. He also learned of a secret plan to create three successive lines of bunkers and mortars; the Israel Defense Forces would otherwise have expected to encounter only a single line. Cohen was able to find out that the Syrians planned to divert the Jordan River headwaters in an attempt to deprive Israel of water resources, providing information to Israeli forces that enabled them to destroy the equipment prepared for the task during the "War over Water". It is claimed that the intelligence that Cohen gathered before his arrest was an important factor in Israel's success in the Six-Day War, although some intelligence experts have argued that the information he provided about the Golan Heights fortifications was also readily available from ground and aerial reconnaissance.

A 2018 article published in Newsweek by Ronen Bergman excerpted from Bergman's book Rise and Kill First, says that Eli Cohen located Alois Brunner, a former Nazi official and Holocaust perpetrator suspected of living in Syria, and relayed the information to an Israeli intelligence unit that subsequently sent letter bombs to Brunner, causing him to lose an eye in 1961 and the fingers of his left hand in 1980 when the parcels blew up in his hands.

== Discovery and death ==
Following the 1963 Syrian coup d'état, newly appointed Syrian Intelligence Colonel Ahmed Suidani disliked Cohen and did not trust figures close to the Second Syrian Republic. In November 1964, Cohen expressed fear of discovery to the Mossad on his last secret visit to Israel to pass on intelligence and to witness the birth of his third child, and stated that he wished to terminate his assignment in Syria. Despite this, however, Israeli intelligence asked him to return one more time to Syria. Before leaving, Cohen assured his wife that it would be his last trip before he returned home permanently.

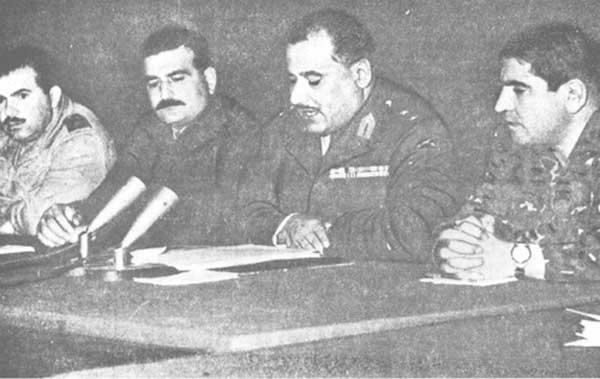
Syrian officers during Cohen's military tribunal, 1965

In January 1965, Syrian officials, who used Soviet-made tracking equipment and were assisted by Soviet experts, increased their efforts to find a high-level spy. They observed a period of radio silence, in the hope that any illegal transmissions could be identified. They successfully detected radio transmissions and were able to triangulate the transmitter. Syrian security services led by Suidani broke into Cohen's apartment on 24 January and claimed to have caught him in the middle of a transmission to Israel.

Cohen was found guilty of espionage by a military tribunal and sentenced to death under martial law. He had been repeatedly interrogated and tortured.

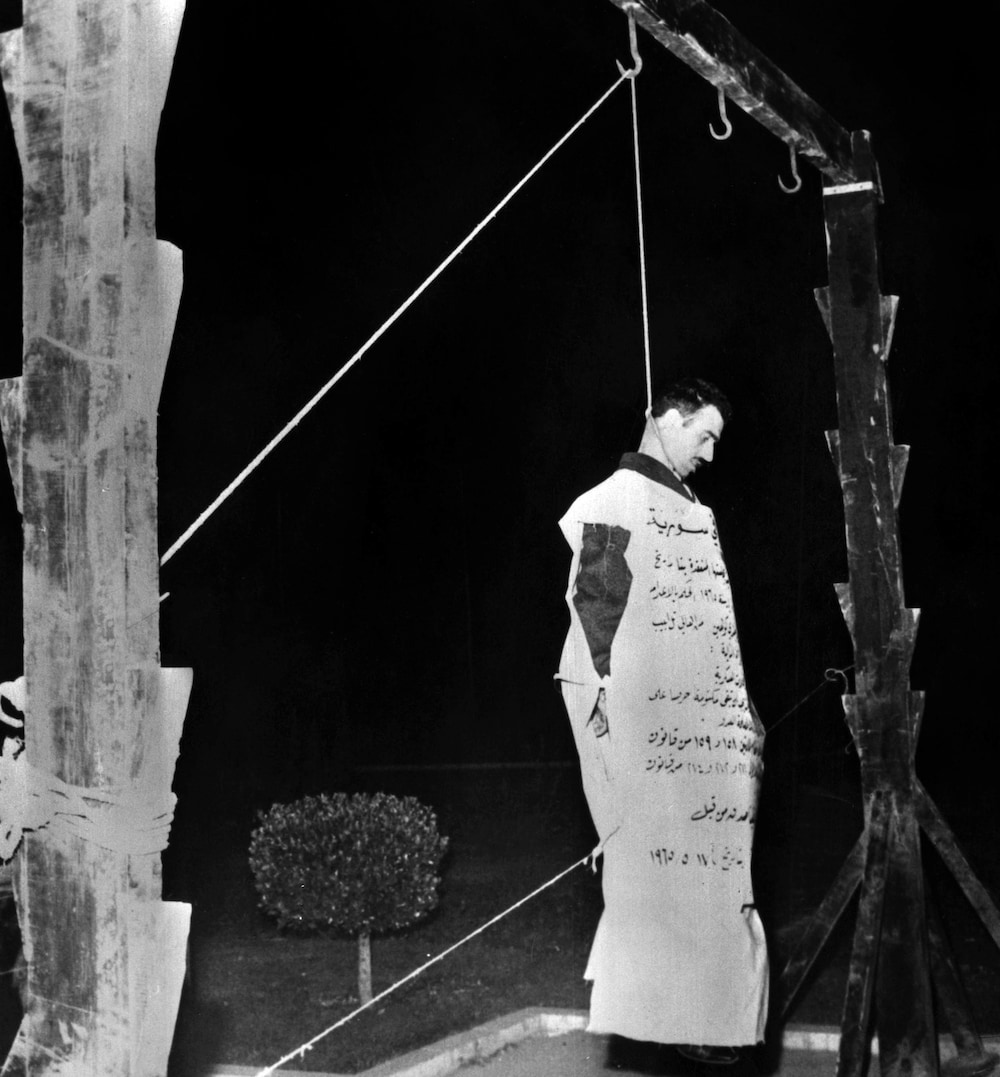
Cohen's public execution in the Marjeh Square, Damascus, 18 May 1965

Israel staged an international campaign for clemency, hoping to persuade Syria not to execute him. Israeli foreign minister Golda Meir led a campaign urging Damascus to consider the consequences of hanging him. Diplomats, prime ministers, parliamentarians, and Pope Paul VI tried to intercede. Meir even appealed to the Soviet Union. The governments of Belgium, Canada, and France tried to persuade the Syrian government to commute the death sentence, but the Syrians refused. Nadia Cohen attempted to appeal for clemency at the Syrian Embassy in Paris but was turned away. Cohen wrote in his final letter on 15 May 1965:

I am begging you, my dear Nadia, not to spend your time in weeping about something already passed. Concentrate on yourself, looking forward for a better future!

Cohen was publicly hanged in the Marjeh Square in Damascus on 18 May 1965. The execution was recorded on 35 mm film. On the day of his execution, his last wish to see a rabbi was respected by the prison authorities, and Nissim Indibo, the Chief Rabbi of Syria, accompanied him in the truck. He was also allowed to write a final letter to his wife.

== Burial ==
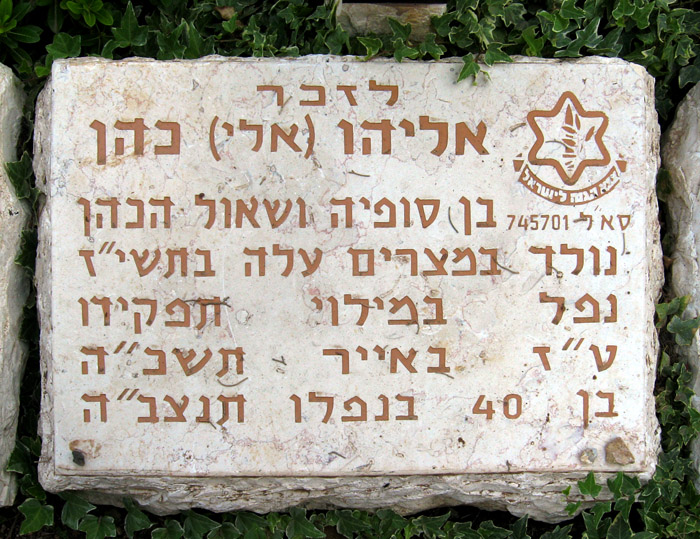
Memorial stone reading Eliahu (Eli) Cohen, in the "Garden of the Missing Soldiers" on Mount Herzl in Jerusalem.

Syria refused to return Cohen's body to his family in Israel, and his wife Nadia sent a letter to Amin al-Hafiz in November 1965 asking his forgiveness for Cohen's actions and requesting his remains. In February 2007, Turkey offered to act as a mediator for their return.

Monthir Maosily, the former bureau chief of Hafez al-Assad, claimed in August 2008 that the Syrians had buried him three times to stop the remains from being taken back to Israel via a special operation. Syrian authorities have repeatedly denied family requests for the remains. Cohen's brothers Abraham and Maurice led a campaign to return his remains; Maurice died in 2006, and Nadia now leads it.

In 2016, a Syrian group calling itself "Syrian art treasures" posted a video on Facebook showing Cohen's body after his execution. No film or video was previously known to exist of the execution. The press announced on 5 July 2018 that Cohen's wristwatch had been retrieved from Syria. His widow mentioned that the watch was up for sale months earlier, and Mossad managed to obtain it. Mossad director Yossi Cohen presented it to Cohen's family in a ceremony, and it is currently on display at Mossad headquarters.

On 18 May 2025, marking the 60th anniversary of Cohen's execution, the Israeli Prime Minister's Office announced that approximately 2,500 documents and personal items belonging to Cohen were retrieved from Syria in a covert Mossad operation. The collection, constituting the entirety of the Syrian archive on Cohen, included handwritten letters to his family, evidence of communications with senior Syrian officials, photographs from his time undercover, personal belongings such as the keys to his Damascus apartment, and his original will written hours before his execution. The items were subsequently given to his widow.

== Legacy ==
Cohen is regarded as a national hero in Israel, and many streets and neighbourhoods have been named after him. Prime Minister Menachem Begin, Defense Minister Ezer Weizmann, Chief of Staff Mordechai Gur, and several Mossad operatives all attended his son's bar mitzvah in 1977. A memorial stone has been erected to Cohen in the Garden of the Missing Soldiers in Mount Herzl, Jerusalem.

John Shea played Cohen in the television film The Impossible Spy (1987), and Sacha Baron Cohen played him in the Netflix miniseries The Spy (2019).

The Eli Cohen Museum, centered on Cohen's life and career, opened in Herzliya on 12 December 2022. Among the artifacts on display is Cohen's wristwatch, "retrieved from Syria in 2018. Then-Mossad director Yossi Cohen presented it to the family in a ceremony; details of how it was obtained were not disclosed."

The Israeli settlement Eliad in the Golan Heights is named after him.
