= Abdul-Karim al-Jundi =

Syrian military officer and Ba'ath Party's Military Committee member (1932–1969)

- عبد الكريم الجندي
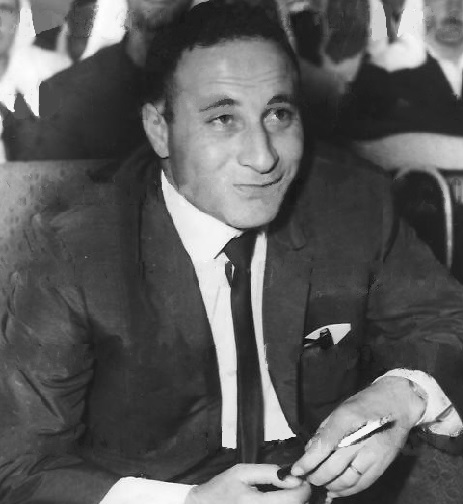
- Abd al-Karim al-Jundi, 1966

Minister of Agrarian Reform
- In office 1 March 1966 – 15 October 1966
- President: Nureddin al-Atassi
- Prime Minister: Yusuf Zuwayin
- Preceded by: Jamil Haddad
- In office 4 October 1964 – 21 December 1965
- President: Amin al-Hafiz
- Prime Minister: Amin al-Hafiz; Yusuf Zuayyin
- Preceded by: Salah Wazzan
- Succeeded by: Jamil Haddad

Director of the National Security Bureau of the Syrian Regional Branch
- In office 27 March 1966 – 2 March 1969
- Preceded by: Office established
- Succeeded by: Naji Jamil

Member of the Regional Command of the Syrian Regional Branch
- In office 27 March 1966 – 13 March 1969
- In office 1 August 1965 – 19 December 1965
- In office 1 February 1964 – 4 April 1965

Personal details
- Born: 1932 Salamiyah, French Mandate of Syria
- Died: 2 March 1969 (aged 37) Damascus, Syria
- Party: Arab Socialist Ba'ath Party (1952–1966); Syrian-led Ba'ath Party (Syrian branch: 1966–1969)

Military service
- Allegiance: Second Syrian Republic (1952–1958); United Arab Republic (1958–1961); Second Syrian Republic (1961–1963); Ba'athist Syria (1963–1969)
- Rank: Lieutenant colonel
- Commands: Commander of the Rocket Forces at al-Qutayfah (1963–1964)

Abd al-Karim al-Jundi (Arabic: عبد الكريم الجندي; 1932 – 2 March 1969) was a Syrian military officer and founding member of the Ba'ath Party's Military Committee which took over power in the country after the 1963 military coup. He also served as Minister of Agrarian Reform, Director of the National Security Bureau and leader of the Red National Guard.

== Biography ==
=== Early life ===
Al-Jundi was born to a small landowning family in the rural town of Salamiyah in the Hamah Governorate. Though Salamiyah was a predominantly Ismaili town, al-Jundi belonged to the Sunni minority of the area and would later in life be known as 'an inciter of anti-Ismaili sentiments.' Al-Jundi received his military training at the Homs Military Academy.

=== Ba'ath Party ===
Al-Jundi, like many members of his family, joined the Ba'ath Party early in his youth. In 1960, al-Jundi, then a captain in the army of the United Arab Republic (UAR), became a founding member of the secretive Military Committee of the Ba'ath Party. (Note: The other founding members were Hafez al-Assad, Salah Jadid, Ahmad al-Mir and Muhammad Umran.) In the beginning, the Military Committee's goal was to rebuild the Ba'ath Party, which had been dissolved on the orders of Gamal Abdel Nasser when the UAR was founded, and establish a new party leadership. Following the Syrian secessionist coup of 1961 that ended the UAR, the Military Committee started planning its own coup against the secessionist government.

On 8 March 1963, the Military Committee launched a successful coup against the government of Nazim al-Qudsi, bringing the Ba'ath Party to power in Syria. Following the coup, al-Jundi became a member of the National Council for the Revolutionary Command, and the Ba'ath Party Regional Command. Between 1963 and 1964, he served as commander of the Rocket Forces at al-Qutayfah.

==== Minister of Agrarian Reform ====
Between 4 October 1964 and 21 December 1965, al-Jundi served as Minister of Agrarian Reform in the two successive cabinets of Amin al-Hafiz and Yusuf Zuayyin. Al-Jundi's tenure saw rapid state appropriation of agrarian land from traditional landowners. But he was opposed to the redistribution of the lands in small lots. Instead, he advocated collective farming. In 1966, Al-Jundi was again given the portfolio of agrarian reform in the Yusuf Zuayyin cabinet, which lasted from 1 March to 15 October.

==== National Security Bureau ====
Following the 1966 coup d'état, Salah Jadid became the undisputed strongman of the country. He began his rule by re-organizing all the intelligence agencies under the central command of the Baath Party's National Security Bureau. Jadid appointed his ally, al-Jundi, to head the National Security Bureau, which became known as the most intimidating apparatus in the country. The Bureau, under al-Jundi, acquired a notorious reputation in the country for its brutal methods of rooting out opponents, including arbitrary arrests, torture and infiltrating civil society with state informers.

== Death ==
In early 1969 the power-struggle between Defence Minister Hafez al-Assad and Jadid became increasingly bitter and violent. As a result, al-Jundi's power and influence rapidly declined. He committed suicide on 2 March 1969 after an argument on the phone with chief of military intelligence, Ali Zaza, which occurred after al-Jundi's personal driver was arrested by Zaza's security forces loyal to al-Assad.
