= Yusuf Zuayyin =

Prime minister of Syria (1965, 1966–1968)

- يوسف زعيّـن
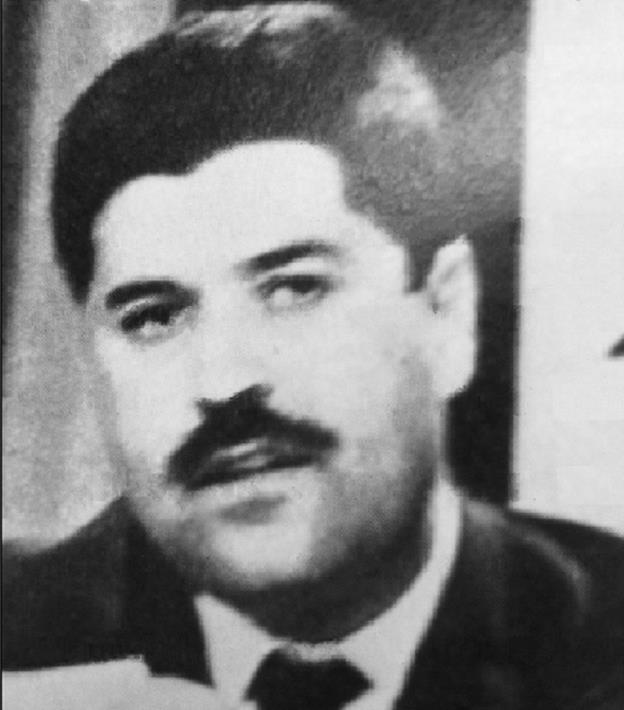
- Zuayyin in June 1967

Prime Minister of Syria
- In office 1 March 1966 – 29 October 1968
- President: Nureddin al-Atassi
- Preceded by: Salah al-Din al-Bitar
- Succeeded by: Nureddin al-Atassi
- In office 23 September 1965 – 21 December 1965
- President: Amin al-Hafiz
- Preceded by: Amin al-Hafiz
- Succeeded by: Salah al-Din al-Bitar

Personal details
- Born: 25 January 1931 Abu Kamal, French Mandate of Syria (present-day Syria)
- Died: 10 January 2016 (aged 84) Stockholm, Sweden
- Party: Ba'ath Party

Yusuf Zuayyin (Arabic: يوسف زعيّـن; 25 January 1931 – 10 January 2016) was a Syrian politician. A member of the Ba'ath Party, he served as Prime Minister of Syria in 1965 and again from 1966 to 1968. He was born in Abu Kamal.

After the 1970 coup, Zuayyin was arrested on November 13, 1970 and imprisoned for 11 years. He was released in 1981, being allowed to travel to the United Kingdom for medical treatment. After his recovery, he lived in Hungary and Sweden.

Zuayyin died after a long illness on 10 January 2016 in Stockholm, Sweden at the age of 84.
