= Amin al-Hafiz =

Syrian politician and army general (1921–2009)

Amin al-Hafez
- أمين الحافظ
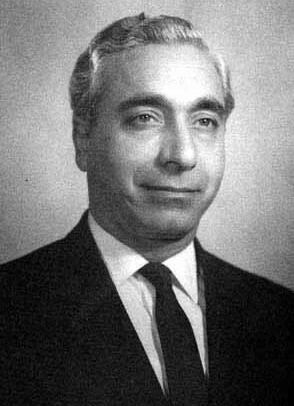
- Hafez c. 1960s

Regional Secretary of the Regional Command of the Syrian Regional Branch
- In office 4 October 1964 – 19 December 1965
- Secretary General: Michel Aflaq; Munif al-Razzaz
- Preceded by: Shibli al-Aysami
- Succeeded by: Nureddin al-Atassi (Regional Command dissolved in December 1965, new Regional Secretary elected in March 1966)

15th President of Syria
- In office 27 July 1963 – 23 February 1966
- Vice President: Muhammad Umran; Nureddin al-Atassi; Shibli al-Aysami
- Preceded by: Lu'ay al-Atassi
- Succeeded by: Nureddin al-Atassi

Prime Minister of Syria
- In office 4 October 1964 – 23 September 1965
- Preceded by: Salah al-Din Bitar
- Succeeded by: Yusuf Zu'ayyin
- In office 12 November 1963 – 13 May 1964
- Preceded by: Salah al-Din Bitar
- Succeeded by: Salah al-Din Bitar

Member of the National Command of the Arab Socialist Ba'ath Party
- In office 23 October 1963 – 23 February 1966

Member of the Regional Command of the Syrian Regional Branch
- In office 1 February 1964 – 19 December 1965

Personal details
- Born: 1921 Aleppo, State of Aleppo
- Died: 17 December 2009 (aged 88) Aleppo, Syrian Arab Republic
- Party: Ba'ath Party
- Spouse: Zeinab al-Hafiz

Military service
- Allegiance: France (1938–1946); First Syrian Republic (1946–1950); Second Syrian Republic (1950–1958); United Arab Republic (1958–1961); Second Syrian Republic (1961–1963); Ba'athist Syria (1963–1966)
- Branch/service: Syrian Arab Army
- Years of service: 1938–1966
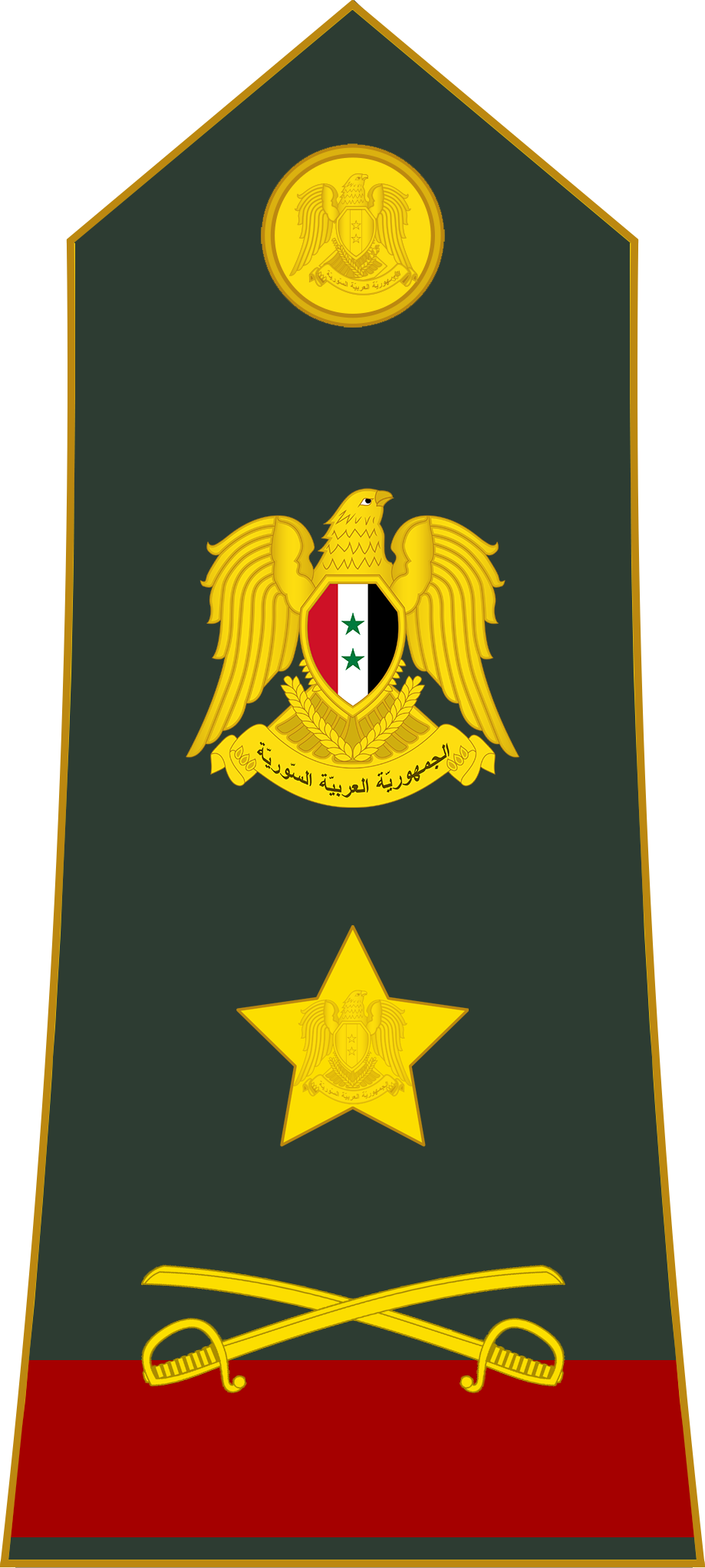
- Rank: General of the Army
- Battles/wars: World War II; 1948 Arab–Israeli War

Amin al-Hafiz (Arabic: أمين الحافظ, romanized: Amīn al-Ḥāfiẓ 1921 – 17 December 2009), also known as Amin Hafez, was a Syrian general, politician, and member of the Ba'ath Party who served as the president of Syria from 27 July 1963 to 23 February 1966.

== Early life ==
Amin al-Hafiz was born in 1921 in a Sunni Arab family, the son of a police officer from the city of Aleppo. When he was young, like other students, he threw stones at the French colonial authorities during the French mandate of Syria. In 1948, at the age of 27, al-Hafiz volunteered to fight in the 1948 Arab–Israeli War. In 1954, he joined the uprising against Adib Shishakli and was promoted to command the Eastern Front at Deir ez-Zor and then to be commander of the Homs academy, before being posted to Cairo. When Syria broke with Egypt in September 1961, al-Hafiz was sent home to Damascus.

== Career ==
=== Rise to power ===
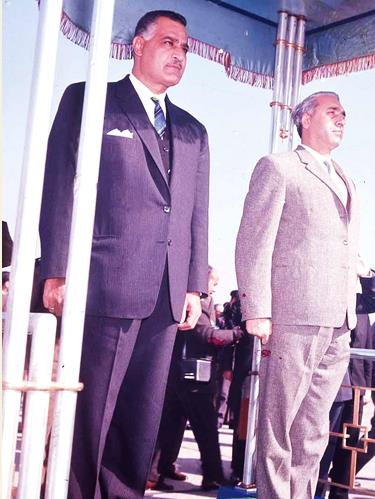
Hafiz (right) with Egyptian President Gamal Abdel Nasser on his arrival to Cairo for the 1964 Arab League summit

During his stay in Damascus, he was contacted again by the military committee's leader, Muhammad Umran. In December 1961, the Qudsi regime exiled Amin to Buenos Aires as military attaché, and it was from there that he was summoned back to Syria by the victorious officers after the 8 March coup. The coup d'état, led by the military committee, introduced al-Hafiz to public life. In the aftermath, the National Council of the Revolutionary Command (NCRC) became the country's supreme organ. It was dominated by the Syrian branch of the radical, pan-Arab Ba'ath Party. Amin became president, instituted socialist reforms, and oriented his country towards the Eastern Bloc. In January 1965, Amin signed the so-called Ramadan Socialist Decrees, which nationalized more than 100 large enterprises in Syria.

=== Downfall ===
On 23 February 1966, al-Hafiz was overthrown by a radical Ba'athist faction headed by Chief of Staff Salah Jadid. A late warning telegram of the coup d'état was sent from Egyptian President Gamal Abdel Nasser to Nasim al-Safarjalani (The General Secretary of Presidential Council), on the early morning of the coup d'état. The coup sprung out of factional rivalry between Jadid's "regionalist" (qutri) camp of the Ba'ath Party, which promoted ambitions for a Greater Syria, and the more traditionally pan-Arab al-Hafiz faction, called the "nationalist" (qawmi) faction. Jadid's supporters were also seen as more radically left-wing. The coup was also supported and led by officers from Syria's religious minorities, especially the Alawites and the Druze, whereas al-Hafiz belonged to the majority Sunni population.

== Exile and return ==
After being wounded in the three-hour shootout that preceded the coup, in which two of his children were seriously injured, al-Hafiz was jailed in Damascus's Mezzeh prison before being sent to Lebanon in June 1967. A year later, he was relocated to Baghdad. In 1971, the courts of Damascus sentenced him to death in absentia; however, Saddam Hussein "treated him and his fellow exile, Ba'ath founder Michel Aflaq, like royalty", and the sentence was not carried out. After the fall of Saddam in the Iraq War of 2003, al-Hafiz was quietly allowed to return to Syria. He died in Aleppo on 17 December 2009; reports of his age differ, but he was believed to be in his late 80s. He received a state-sponsored funeral.

== Popular culture ==
Amin al-Hafiz was portrayed by Waleed Zuaiter in the Netflix series The Spy.
