= Ba'athism =

Pan-Arab socialist ideology

Ba'athism, also spelled Baathism, (Note: /ˈbɑːθɪzm/; Arabic: البعثية al-Baʿthīyah IPA: [albaʕˈθijja], from بعث baʿth IPA: [baʕθ], meaning "renaissance" or "resurrection") is an Arab nationalist ideology which advocates the establishment of a unified Arab state through the rule of a Ba'athist vanguard party operating under a revolutionary socialist framework. The ideology is officially based on the theories of the Syrian intellectuals Michel Aflaq (per the Iraqi-led Ba'ath Party), Zaki al-Arsuzi (per the Syrian-led Ba'ath Party), and Salah al-Din al-Bitar. Ba'athist leaders of the modern era include the former president of Iraq Saddam Hussein, and former presidents of Syria Hafez al-Assad and his son Bashar al-Assad.

The Ba'athist ideology advocates the "enlightenment of the Arabs" as well as the renaissance of their culture, values and society. It also advocates the creation of one-party states and rejects political pluralism in an unspecified length of time—the Ba'ath party theoretically uses an unspecified amount of time to develop an "enlightened" Arab society. Ba'athism is founded on the principles of Arab nationalism, Pan-Arabism, and Arab socialism, as exemplified by its slogan "Unity, Freedom, Socialism". (Note: Arabic: وَحْدَةٌ، حُرِّيَّةٌ، اِشْتِرَاكِيَّةٌ, lit. 'Waḥda, Ḥurriyya, Ishtirākiyya')

Ba'athism advocates socialist economic policies such as state ownership of natural resources, protectionism, distribution of lands to peasants, and planned economies. Although inspired by Western socialist thinkers, early Ba'athist theoreticians rejected the Marxist class-struggle concept, arguing that it hampers Arab unity. Ba'athists contend that socialism is the only way to develop modern Arab society and unite it.

The two Ba'athist states which existed—Iraq and Syria—attempted to prevent criticism of their ideology through authoritarian means of governance. Ba'athist Syria's state ideology was neo-Ba'athism, a more left-leaning form of Ba'athist ideology developed by the Assadist leadership of the Syrian Ba'ath party, which was quite distinct from the Ba'athism which Aflaq and Bitar wrote about. The Iraqi Ba'ath Party, meanwhile, was dominated by Saddamism, culminating in an inter-Ba'athist conflict between the two Ba'athist states. Both Ba'athist regimes were ousted from power as a result of the U.S.-led invasion of Iraq in 2003 and the renewed rebel offensive in Syria in 2024 amid the Syrian civil war. After the dissolution of the Ba'athist party in Syria in 2025, very few Ba'athist groups remain in other countries with limited influence. In Lebanon, organizations linked to the Ba'athist party currently face forced dissolution by the government.

== History ==
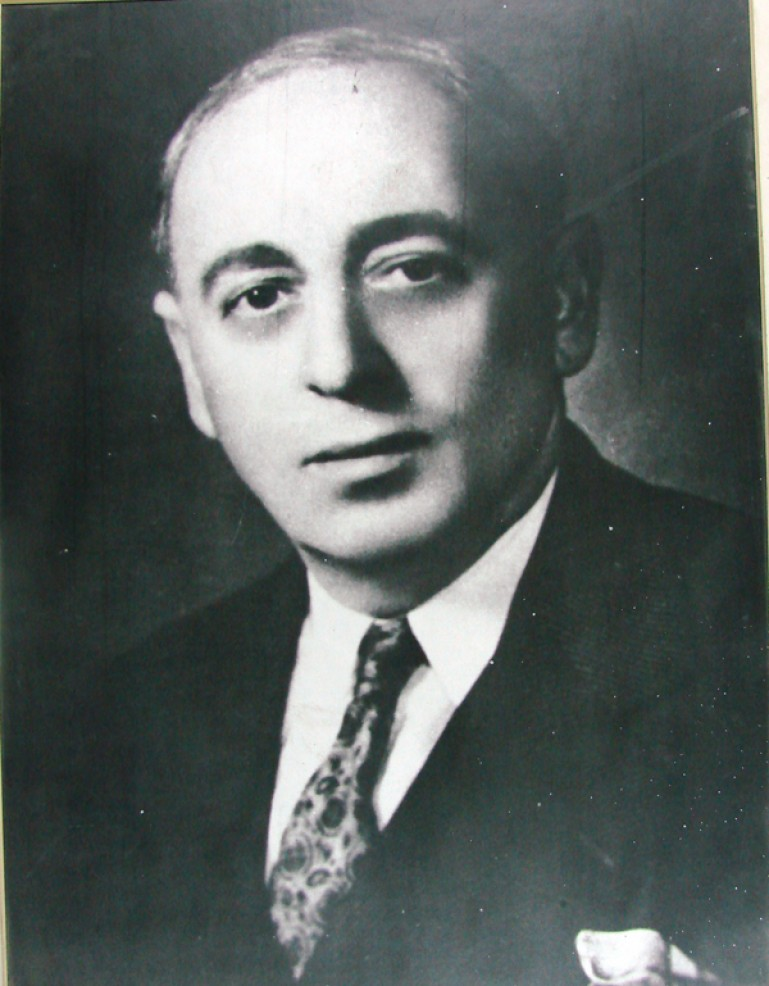
Zaki Arsuzi, politician who influenced Ba'athist thought and, after the Ba'ath Party splintered, became the chief ideologist of the Syrian-dominated Ba'ath Party

Ba'athism originated in the political thought of Syrian philosophers Michel Aflaq, Salah al-Din al-Bitar, and Zaki Arsuzi. They are considered the founders of the ideology, despite forming different organizations. In the 1940s, Bitar and Aflaq co-founded the Ba'ath Party, while Arsuzi founded the Arab National Party and later the Arab Ba'ath. The closest they ever came to being members of the same organization was in 1939, when, together with Michel Quzman, Shakir al-As and Ilyas Qandalaft, they briefly tried to establish a party. The party likely failed due to personal animosity between Arsuzi and Aflaq.

Arsuzi formed the Arab Ba'ath in 1940 and his views influenced Aflaq, who alongside the more junior Bitar founded the Arab Ihya Movement in 1940, later renamed the Arab Ba'ath Movement in 1943. Though Aflaq was influenced by him, Arsuzi initially did not cooperate with Aflaq's movement. Arsuzi suspected that the existence of the Arab Ihya Movement, which occasionally titled itself "Arab Ba'ath" during 1941, was part of an imperialist plot to prevent his influence over the Arabs by creating a movement of the same name.

Arsuzi was an Arab from Alexandretta who had been associated with Arab nationalist politics during the interwar period. He was inspired by the French Revolution, the German and Italian unification movements, and the Japanese economic "miracle". His views were influenced by a number of prominent European philosophical and political figures, among them Georg Hegel, Karl Marx, Friedrich Nietzsche and Oswald Spengler.

Arsuzi left the League of Nationalist Action (LNA) in 1939 after its popular leader died and the party fell into disarray, founding the short-lived Arab National Party. It dissolved later that year. On 29 November 1940, Arsuzi founded the Arab Ba'ath. A significant conflict and turning point in the development of Ba'athism occurred when Arsuzi's and Aflaq's movements sparred over the 1941 Iraqi coup d'état by Rashid Ali Al-Gaylani and the subsequent Anglo-Iraqi War. Aflaq's movement supported Gaylani's government and the Iraqi government's war against the British and organized volunteers to go to Iraq and fight for the Iraqi government. However, Arsuzi opposed Gaylani's government, considering the coup to be poorly planned and a failure. Because of this, Arsuzi's party lost members and support that transferred to Aflaq's movement. Arsuzi's direct influence in Arab politics collapsed after Vichy French authorities expelled him from Syria in 1941.

Aflaq's Arab Ba'ath Movement's next major political action was its support of Lebanon's war of independence from France in 1943. Still, the movement did not solidify for years until it held its first party congress in 1947 and formally merged with Arsuzi's Arab Ba'ath Party. Although socialist values existed in the two Ba'ath movements from their inception, they weren't emphasized until the party merged with Akram Al-Hawrani's Arab Socialist Movement in 1953.

Taking advantage of the chaotic years of the 1950s and 1960s, the Military Committee of the Syrian Ba'ath party, led by its civilian leadership, launched a coup in 1963 that established a one-party state in Syria. In 1966, the military wing of the Syrian Ba'ath initiated another coup which overthrew the Old Guard led by Aflaq and Bitar, resulting in a schism within the Ba'athist movement: one Syrian-dominated and one Iraqi-dominated. Scholar Ofra Bengio claims that as a consequence of the split, Arsuzi took Aflaq's place as the official father of Ba'athist thought in the pro-Syrian Ba'ath movement, while in the pro-Iraqi Ba'ath movement Aflaq was still considered the de jure father of Ba'athist thought. The Iraqi Ba'ath wing granted asylum to Aflaq after seizing power through the coup of 1968.

The Assad family and Saddam Hussein emerged dominant in the Syrian and Iraqi Ba'ath parties, respectively, eventually building personalist dictatorships in the two countries. Hostilities between the two Ba'ath movements lasted until the death of Hafez al-Assad in 2000, after which his successor Bashar al-Assad pursued reconciliation with Iraq.

Throughout their reigns, the two Ba'athist autocracies built police states that enforced mass surveillance and ideological indoctrination and subordinated all student organisations, trade unions, and other civil society institutions to the party and the state. Both regimes pursued Arabization of ethnic minorities and legitimized their authoritarian rule by implanting conspiratorial anti-Zionist, anti-Western sentiments upon the citizens.

In Iraq, Saddam Hussein was toppled in 2003 during the United States invasion, and the Iraqi Ba'ath party was subsequently banned under the new De-Ba'athification policy. In Syria, a deadly civil war began after Bashar al-Assad's brutal crackdown of the 2011 Syrian revolution. It culminated in the fall of the Assad regime on 8 December 2024, signaling the end of Ba'athist rule in Syria. Assad's downfall also signals the likely demise of the Syrian Ba’ath Party's presence in Lebanon where it once wielded significant power during Syria's occupation of Lebanon, but currently derives its influence from Hezbollah. The fall of the Ba'athist regimes in Syria and Iraq also marked the end of its ideological influence.

== Definition ==
Michel Aflaq is today considered the founder of the Ba'athist movement, or at least its most notable contributor. Other notable ideologues include Zaki Arsuzi, who influenced Aflaq, and Salah al-Din al-Bitar, who worked directly with Aflaq. From the founding of the Arab Ba'ath Movement until the mid-1950s in Syria and the early 1960s in Iraq, the ideology of the Ba'ath Party was largely synonymous with that of Aflaq's. For more than 2 decades, Michel Aflaq's 1940 essay compilation, titled, "Fi Sabil al-Ba’ath" (trans: "The Road to Renaissance") was the primary ideological book of the Ba'ath party. Additionally, Aflaq's views on Arab nationalism are considered by some, such as historian Paul Salem of the Middle East Institute, as romantic and poetic.

Aflaq's ideology was developed in the context of decolonisation and other events in the Arab world during his life. It recast conservative Arab nationalist thought to reflect strong revolutionary and progressive themes. For example, Aflaq insisted on the overthrow of the old ruling classes and supported the creation of a secular society by separating Islam from the state. Not all these ideas were his, but it was Aflaq who succeeded in turning these beliefs into a transnational movement.

The core basis of Ba'athism is Arab socialism, socialism with Arab characteristics which is separate from the international socialist movement and pan-Arab ideology. Ba'athism as developed by Aflaq and Bitar is a unique left-wing, Arab-centric ideology. It claims to represent the "Arab spirit against materialistic communism" and "Arab history against dead reaction". It holds ideological similarity and a favorable outlook to the Non-Aligned Movement politics of Indian leader Jawaharlal Nehru, Egyptian leader Gamal Abdel Nasser, and Yugoslavian leader Josip Broz Tito and historically opposed affiliation with either the American-led Western Bloc or the Soviet-led Eastern Bloc during the Cold War.

== Concepts ==
=== Arab nation ===
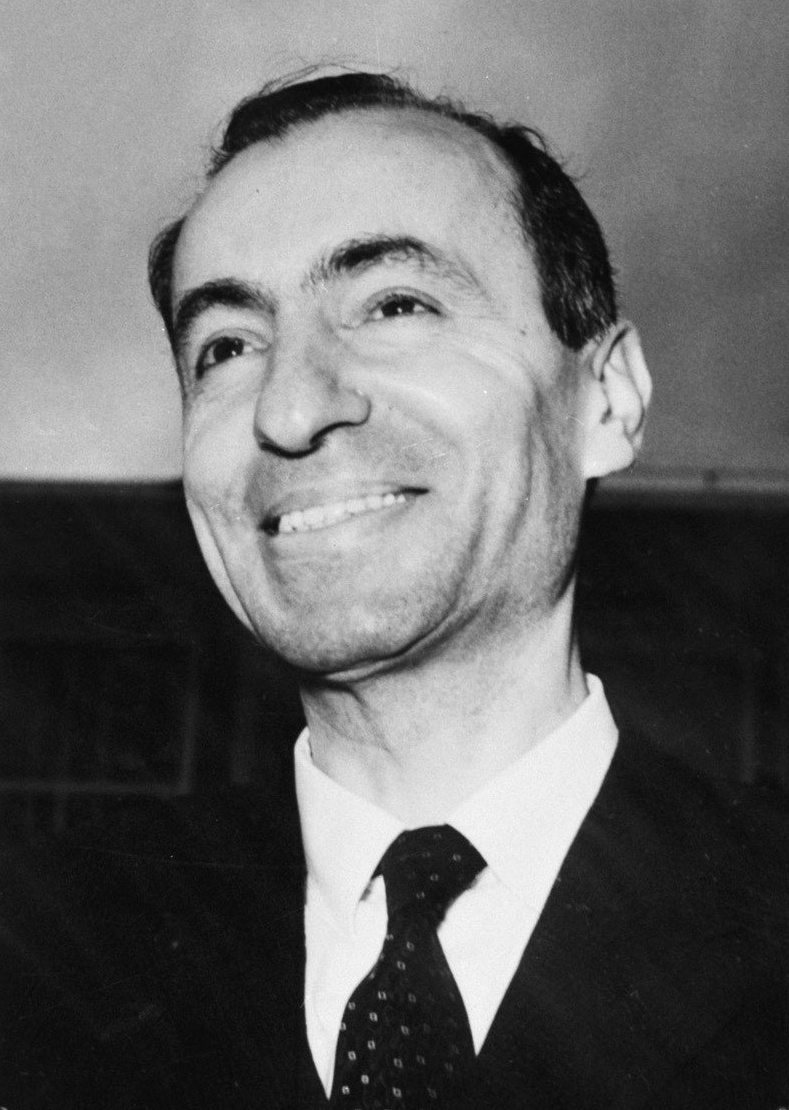
Michel Aflaq, the founder of Ba'athist thought who, after the Ba'ath Party splintered, became the chief ideologist for the Iraqi-dominated Ba'ath Party

Michel Aflaq supported the Arab nationalist Sati' al-Husri's view that language was the principal defining and unifying factor of the "Arab nation" because language led to the unity of thought, norms and ideals. History was another unifying feature for them, as it was the "fertile ground in which our consciousness took shape". The centre of Aflaq's Ba'athist thought was the feature baʽth (literally meaning "renaissance").

This renaissance, according to Aflaq, could only be reached by uniting the Arab nation, and it would transform the Arab world politically, economically, intellectually, and morally. This "future renaissance" would be a "rebirth", while the first Arab renaissance had been the seventh-century emergence of Islam, according to Aflaq. The new renaissance would bring another Arab message, summed up in the Ba'ath party's slogan, "One Nation, Bearing an Eternal Message".

Aflaq thought that the Arab nation could only reach this renaissance through a revolutionary process towards the goals of "unity, liberty, and socialism". In Aflaq's view, a nation could only "progress" or "decline", and Arab states of his time were consistently declining because of their "illnesses"—"feudalism, sectarianism, regionalism, intellectual reactionism". These problems, Aflaq believed, could only be resolved through a revolutionary process, and a revolution could only succeed if the revolutionaries were pure and devoted nearly religiously to the task. Aflaq supported the Leninist view of the need for a vanguard party following a successful revolution, which was not an "inevitable outcome". In Ba'athist ideology, the vanguard was the Ba'ath party.

Aflaq believed that the youth were the key for a successful revolution. The youth were open to change and enlightenment because they still had not been indoctrinated with other views. According to Aflaq, a major problem was the disillusionment of the Arab youth. Disillusionment led to individualism and individualism was not a healthy sign in an underdeveloped country, in contrast to developed countries, where it was seen as a healthy sign.

The party's main task before the revolution was to spread enlightened ideas to the people and to challenge reactionary and conservative elements in society. According to Aflaq, a Ba'ath party would ensure a policy of proselytization to keep the uneducated masses out of the party until the party leadership was imbued with the thoughts of enlightenment. However, the party was also a political organisation, and, as Aflaq notes, politics was "a means [... and] is the most serious of matters at this present stage". Ba'athism was similar to Leninist thought in that a vanguard party would rule for an unspecified length to construct a "new society".

Aflaq supported the idea of a committed activist revolutionary party based on the Leninist model, which in practice was based on democratic centralism. The revolutionary party would seize political power and from there on transform society for the greater good. While the revolutionary party was numerically a minority, it was an all-powerful institution which had the right to initiate a policy, even if the majority of the population were against it. As with the Leninist model, the Ba'ath party would dictate what was right and what was wrong, since the general population were still influenced by the old value and moral system.

=== Reactionary classes ===
According to Aflaq, the Arab Revolt (1916–1918) against the Ottoman Empire failed to unify the Arab world because it was led by a reactionary class. He believed the ruling class, who supported the monarchy as the leaders of the Arab Revolt did, were synonymous with a reactionary class. In Ba'athist ideology, the ruling class is replaced by a revolutionary progressive class. Aflaq was bitterly opposed to any kind of monarchy and described the Arab Revolt as "the illusions of kings and feudal lords who understood unity as the gathering of backwardness to backwardness, exploitation to exploitation and numbers to numbers like sheep".

According to Aflaq, it was the reactionary class's view of Arab unity which had left the Arab Revolt "struggling for unity without blood and nerve". He saw the German unification as proof of this, putting him at odds with some Arab nationalists who were Germanophiles. In Aflaq's view, Bismarck's unification of Germany established the most repressive nation the world had ever seen, a development which could largely be blamed on the existing monarchy and the reactionary class. To copy the German example, he thought, would be disastrous and would lead to the enslavement of the Arab people.

The only way to combat the reactionary classes lay in "progressive" revolution, Aflaq claimed, central to which is the struggle for unity. This struggle could not be separated from the social revolution, for to separate these two would be to weaken the movement. The reactionary classes, who are content with the status quo, would oppose the "progressive" revolution. Even if the revolution succeeded in one "region" (country), that region would be unable to develop because of the resource constraints, small populations and anti-revolution forces held by other Arab leaders. For a revolution to succeed, the Arab world would have to evolve into an "organic whole" (literally become one). In short, Aflaq thought that Arab unity would be both the cause of the progressive revolution and its effect.

A major obstacle to the success of the revolution in Aflaq's mind was the Arab League. He believed that the Arab League strengthened both regional interests and the reactionary classes, thus weakening the chance of establishing an Arab nation. Because the majority of Arab states were under the rule of the reactionary classes, Aflaq revised his ideology to meet reality. Instead of creating an Arab nation through an Arab-wide progressive revolution, the main task would be of progressive revolutionaries spreading the revolution from one Arab country to the next. Once successfully transformed, the created progressive revolutionary countries would then one by one unite until the Arab world had evolved into a single Arab nation. The revolution would not succeed if the progressive revolutionary governments did not contribute to spreading the revolution.

=== Liberty ===
Liberty is not a luxury in the life of the nation but its basis and its essence and its meaning.

— Aflaq in a speech dated to 1959

Fundamentally, Aflaq had an authoritarian perspective on liberty. In contrast to the liberal democratic concept of liberty, in Aflaq's vision, liberty would be ensured by a Ba'ath party which was not elected by the populace because the party had the common good at heart. Historian Paul Salem considered the weakness of such a system "quite obvious".

Aflaq saw liberty as one of the defining features of Ba'athism. Articulation of thoughts and the interaction between individuals were a way of building a new society. According to Aflaq, it was liberty which created new values and thoughts. Aflaq believed that living under imperialism, colonialism, or a religious or non-enlightened dictatorship weakened liberty as ideas came from above, not from below through human interaction. One of the Ba'ath party's main priorities, according to Aflaq, was to disseminate new ideas and thoughts and to give individuals the liberty they needed to pursue ideas. To do this, the party would interpose itself between the Arab people and both their foreign imperialist oppressors and those forms of tyranny that arise within Arab society.

While the notion of liberty was an important ideal to Aflaq, he favored the Leninist model of a continuous revolutionary struggle and he did not develop concepts for a society in which liberty was protected by a set of institutions and rules. His vision of a one-party state ruled by the Ba'ath party, which disseminated information to the public, was in many ways contrary to his view on individual interactions. The Ba'ath party through its preeminence would establish "liberty". According to Aflaq, liberty could not just come from nowhere as it needed an enlightened progressive group to create a truly free society.

=== Socialism ===
We did not adopt socialism out of books, abstractions, humanism, or pity, but rather out of need ... for the Arab working class is the mover of history in this period.

— Aflaq's view on the necessity of socialism

Socialism is an important pillar of the Ba'athist programme. Although influenced by Western socialists and Marxist parties, the Ba'ath party founders constructed a socialist vision which they believed to be more adaptable to Arab historical context. Articles 26–37 of the 1947 Ba'ath Party Charter outlines the key principles of Ba'athist socialism. Some of them are:

"

- Article 26: The Arab Ba'ath Party is socialist, believing that the economic wealth of the homeland belongs to the nation.
- Article 27: The present distribution of wealth in the Arab homeland is unjust. It will therefore be reviewed and distributed among the citizens in a just manner...
- Article 29: Public utility institutions, major natural resources, the principal means of production and transport are the property of the nation and will be administered by the state directly. Companies and foreign concessions will be abolished.
- Article 30: Agricultural property will be fixed in proportion to the owner's ability to exploit it fully without exploiting the effort of others, under the supervision of the state and in accordance with its general economic programme.
- Article 31: Small industrial property will be fixed proportionately to the economic standards enjoyed by other citizens in the state.
- Article 32: Workers will participate in the management of the factory and will be granted, in addition to their wages which will be fixed by the state, a share of the profits of the factory in a proportion to be fixed by the state...
- Article 35: Usury between citizens will be forbidden and a single government bank will be founded which will issue the currency..
- Article 36: The state will directly supervise internal and foreign trade in order to abolish exploitation between consumer and producer, and in order to protect trade and national production from foreign competition."

— Constitution of Arab Socialist Ba'ath Party (1947),

Michel Aflaq was a deep admirer of Marxist tenets, and he considered the Marxist concept of the importance of material economic conditions in life to be one of modern humanity's greatest discoveries. However, he disagreed with the Marxist view that dialectical materialism was the only truth, as Aflaq believed that Marxism had forgotten human spirituality. While believing that the concept would work for small and weak societies, he thought that the concept of dialectical materialism as the only truth in Arab development was wrong.

For a people as spiritual as the Arabs, the working class was just a group, albeit the most important group, in a much larger movement to free the Arab nation. Unlike Karl Marx, Aflaq was uncertain what place the working class had in history. In contrast to Marx, Aflaq also believed in nationalism and believed that in the Arab world, all classes, not just the working class, were working against capitalist domination of the foreign powers. What was a struggle between various classes in the West was in the Arab world a fight for political and economic independence.

For Aflaq, socialism was a necessary means to accomplish the goal of modernisation. While unity brought the Arab world together and liberty provided the Arab people with freedom, socialism was the cornerstone which made unity and liberty possible as no socialism meant no revolution. In Aflaq's view, a constitutional democratic system would not succeed in a country such as Syria that was dominated by a "pseudo-feudalist" economic system in which the repression of the peasant nullified the people's political liberty. Liberty meant little to nothing to the general poverty-stricken populace of Syria, and Aflaq saw socialism as the solution to their plight.

According to Aflaq, the ultimate goal of socialism was not to answer the question of how much state control was necessary or economic equality, but instead socialism was "a means to satisfy the animal needs of man so he can be free to pursue his duties as a human being". In other words, socialism was a system which freed the population from enslavement and created independent individuals. However, economic equality was a major tenet in Ba'athist ideology, as the elimination of inequality would "eliminate all privilege, exploitation, and domination by one group over another". In short, if liberty was to succeed, the Arab people needed socialism.

Aflaq labeled this form of socialism Arab socialism to signify that it existed in harmony with and was in some ways subordinate to Arab nationalism. According to Aflaq, who was a Christian, the teaching and reforms of Muhammad had given socialism an authentic Arab expression. Socialism was viewed by Aflaq as justice, and the reforms of Muhammad were both just and wise. According to Aflaq, modern Ba'athists would initiate another way of just and radical forms just as Muhammad had done in the seventh century.

=== Role of Islam ===
Europe is as fearful of Islam today as she has been in the past. She now knows that the strength of Islam (which in the past expressed that of the Arabs) has been reborn and has appeared in a new form: Arab nationalism.

— From one of Aflaq's works dating back to 1943 about Islam's character

Though a Christian, Aflaq viewed the creation of Islam as proof of "Arab genius" and a testament of Arab culture, values, and thought. According to Aflaq, the essence of Islam was its revolutionary qualities. Aflaq called on all Arabs, both Muslims and non-Muslims alike, to admire the role Islam had played in creating an Arab character, but his view on Islam was purely spiritual and Aflaq emphasized that it "should not be imposed" on state and society. Time and again, Aflaq emphasized that the Ba'ath party was against atheism, but also against fundamentalism, as the fundamentalists represented a "shallow, false faith".

According to Ba'athist ideology, all religions were equal. Despite his anti-atheist stance, Aflaq was a strong supporter of secular government and stated a Ba'athist state would replace religion with a state "based on a foundation, Arab nationalism, and a moral; freedom". During the Shia riots against the Iraqi Ba'ath government in the late-1970s, Aflaq warned Saddam Hussein of making any concessions to the rioters, exclaiming that the Ba'ath Party "is with [religious] faith, but is not a religious party, nor should it be one". During his vice presidency, at the time of the Shia riots, Saddam discussed the need to convince large segments of the population to convert to the party line's stance on religion.

When Aflaq died in 1989, an official announcement by the Iraqi Regional Command stated that Aflaq had converted to Islam before his death, but writer William Harris stated that unnamed Western diplomat in Iraq told him that Aflaq's family was not aware that he had undergone any religious conversion. Prior to, during, and after the Gulf War of 1990–91, the government became progressively more Islamic, and by the beginning of the 1990s, Saddam proclaimed the Ba'ath party to be the party "of Arabism and Islam".

== Syrian Ba'athism ==
"Much like Vaclav Havel's description in The Power of the Powerless of life under a totalitarian regime which 'demands conformity, uniformity and discipline' ... [the] Syrian regime narrated a reality all of its own – far removed from reality itself – derived from its own ideology, creating 'a world of appearances' that perpetuated its power and dominance over its people. Constructing a reality that was 'permeated with hypocrisy and lies' where ... 'the repression of culture is called its development' ... its people were forced to ‘live within a lie’ ... It was not important whether or not a person truly believed these lies; ultimately, it was whether they acted as though they did."

— Tamara Al-Om, British-Syrian political scientist

After the 1963 Syrian coup d'état, the Ba'ath Party which took power in Syria was dominated by a faction of radical Ba'athist military officers known as the "Neo-Ba'ath" or "new Ba'athists". This faction went beyond the pan-Arab ideological basis of Aflaqite Ba'athists by prioritising the establishment of a socialist state, imposing Marxist policies associated with the "class struggle" doctrine and stressed the domination of Ba'athist military apparatus over society. This ideological transformation intensified drastically after the 1966 Syrian coup d'état, led by radical leftist officers including Salah Jadid and Hafez al-Assad, which transformed the party into a militarist neo-Ba'ath organization that became independent of the National Command of the unified Ba'ath party. Following its violent seizure of power, which resulted in the deaths of approximately 400 people, the neo-Ba'athist military committee purged the classical Ba'athist leaders of the old guard, including Michel Aflaq and Salah al-Din Bitar. The coup led to a permanent schism between the Syrian and Iraqi regional branches of the Ba'ath Party, and many Syrian Ba'athist leaders defected to Iraq.

In the original Ba'ath ideology, pan-Arabism was the means to reach the end of both economic and social transformation. As an early party document states: "Socialism is the true goal of Arab unity... Arab unity is the obligatory basis for constructing a socialist society". With the rise of the Syrian neo-Ba'athists, however, this focus shifted. As American scholar John F. Devlin writes, the "Ba'ath Party, which started with unity as its overwhelming top priority, which was prepared to work within a variety of Middle Eastern political systems, which wanted social justice in society, had pretty much disappeared by the early 1960s. In its place rose Ba'ath organisations which focused primarily on their own region, which advocated, and created where possible, authoritarian centralised governments, which rested heavily on military power and which were very close to other socialist movements and were less distinctively Ba'athist".

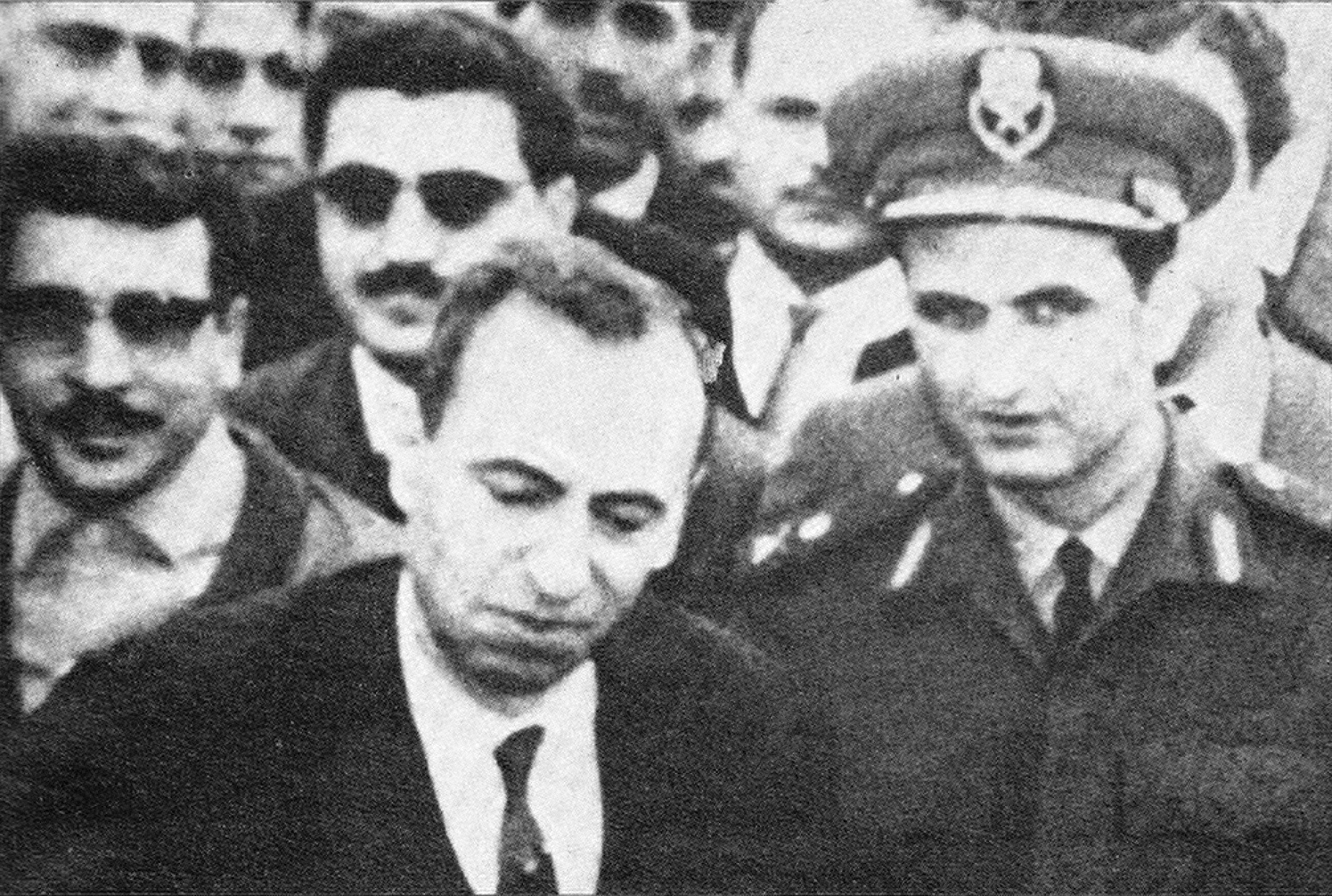
Syrian neo-Ba'athist leader Salah Jadid (right) alongside Michel Aflaq (centre), 1963

Munif al-Razzaz, the former Secretary General of the National Command of the unitary Ba'ath Party, agreed with the distinction of "neo-Ba'ath", writing that from 1961 onwards there existed two Ba'ath parties: "the military Ba'ath Party and the Ba'ath Party, and real power lay with the former". According to Razzaz, the military Ba'ath (as paraphrased by Martin Seymour) "was and remains Ba'athist only in name; that it was and remains little more than a military clique with civilian hangers-on; and that from the initial founding of the Military Committee by disgruntled Syrian officers exiled in Cairo in 1959, the chain of events and the total corruption of Ba'athism proceeded with intolerable logic". Salah al-Din al-Bitar, a member of the Ba'ath old guard, agreed, stating that the 1966 Syrian coup d'état "marked the end of Ba'athist politics in Syria". Ba'ath party founder Michel Aflaq shared the sentiment by stating, "I no longer recognise my party!"

The coup left Salah Jadid in power, and under him, the Syrian government abandoned the traditional goal of pan-Arab unity and replaced it with a radical form of Western socialism. The far-left shift was reflected strongly in the ideological propaganda of the new government, marked by widespread usage of terminology such as "class struggle" and "people's war" (itself a Maoist term, as the Six-Day War was proclaimed as a "people's war" against Israel). The Syrian Communist Party played an important role in Jadid's government, with some communists holding ministerial posts, and Jadid established "fairly close relations" with the Communist Party of the Soviet Union. The government supported a more radical economic program including state ownership over industry and foreign trade, while at the same time trying to restructure agrarian relations and production.

During Jadid's rule, neo-Ba'athist ideologues openly denounced religion as a source of what they considered the "backwardness" of the Arabs. The Jadid regime was anti-religious and imposed severe restrictions on religious freedom, banning religious preaching and persecuting the clergy. Neo-Ba'athists viewed the religious clerics as class enemies to be liquidated by the Ba'athist state. The party disseminated the doctrine of the "Arab Socialist New Man", which conceptualised the "new Arab man" as an atheist who campaigned for socialist revolution and rejected religion, feudalism, imperialism, capitalism, and every value of the old social order.

In 1968, Al-Bitar left the Ba'ath movement, claiming that "these parties had ceased to be what they set up to be, retaining only their names and acting as the organs of power and the instruments of regional and dictatorial governments". Contrary to expectations, Aflaq remained with the Ba'ath movement and became the ideologue of the Iraqi-dominated Ba'ath movement. His ideological views remained more or less the same, but in Iraq he was sidelined politically. In post-1966 Syria, the real centre of power had been vested in the neo-Ba'athist military committee. A tense power rivalry existed between Salah Jadid and Hafez al-Assad, with the former as the leader of civilian Ba'athists while the latter increased his control of the military-wing of the party and various army units. The rivalry culminated in the bloodless 1970 Corrective Revolution, a military coup that placed Assad in power.

=== Assadism ===
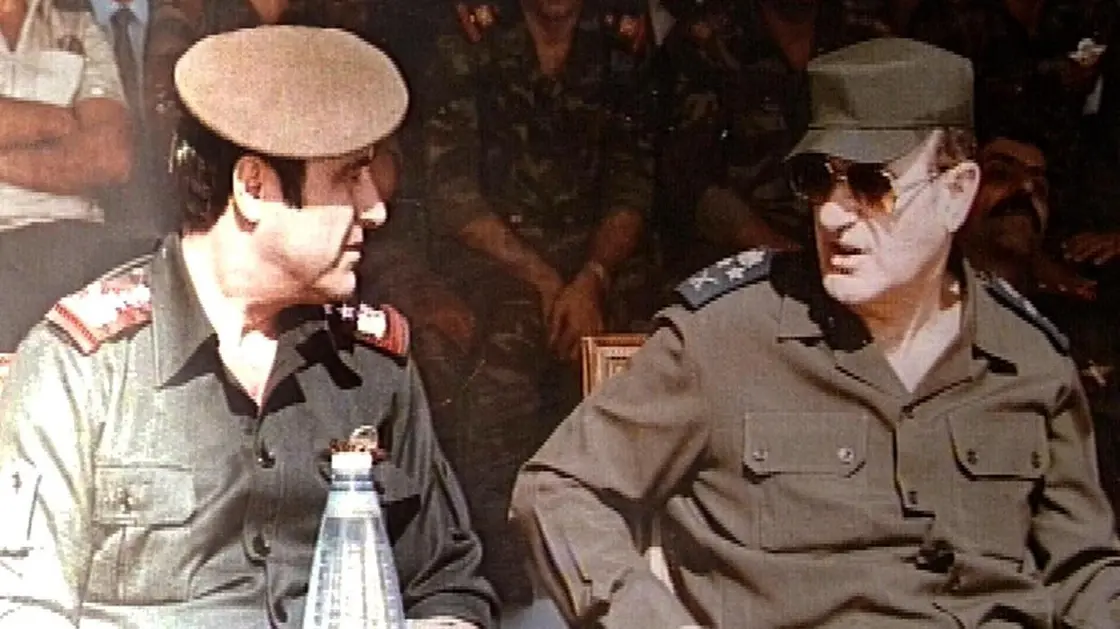
Ba'athist leader Hafez al-Assad alongside his brother Rifaat al-Assad at a military ceremony in Damascus, 1984

Assadism is a neo-Ba'athist ideology based on the policies of Hafez al-Assad after his seizure of power in the 1970 coup, described in official Ba'athist history as the Corrective Movement. It enshrines the Assad family's leadership role in Syrian politics and constructed the Assad regime in a highly personalist fashion, creating a government based upon and revolving around its leader. Under this socio-political system, the Ba'ath party portrays the wisdom of Assad as "beyond the comprehension of the average citizen". Through this apparatus, also known as the "Ba'atho-Assadist system", the Ba'ath party instrumentalized its control over Syria's political, social, economic, cultural, educational and religious spheres to enforce its neo-Ba'athist ideology in the wider society and preserve the Assad family's grip on power. The goal of General Assad was to consolidate the socialist state with the Ba'ath party as its vanguard by establishing a "coup-proof" system that eliminated factional rivalries. As soon as he seized power, the armed forces, secret police, security forces, and bureaucracy were purged, subjugating them to party command by installing Ba'athist elites loyal to Assad.

The neo-Ba'athist, Assadist system controlled Syrian politics from the 1970 coup to the fall of the Assad regime in December 2024. It was largely built upon nepotism and ethnic favoritism. For example, Hafez al-Assad began the ethnoreligious Alawitization of the party and the military, and he also built a government based on loyalty to the leader's family. Jamal al-Atassi, co-founder of Zaki al-Arsuzi's early Arab Ba'ath Party and later Syrian dissident, stated that "Assadism is a false nationalism. It's the domination of a minority, and I'm not talking just of the Alawites, who control the society's nervous system. I include also the army and the mukhabarat. [...] And despite its socialist slogans, the state is run by a class who has made a fortune without contributing—a nouvelle bourgeoisie parasitaire". Assadism is less an ideology than a cult of personality, but it is the closest thing the government of the Syrian Arab Republic had to an all-encompassing belief system, since both Ba'athist and Arab nationalist beliefs of old were watered down to not hurt the government's populist credentials. State propaganda characterised Assadism as a neo-Ba'athist current that evolved Ba'athist ideology with the needs of the modern era.

== Iraqi Ba'athism ==
=== Saddamism ===
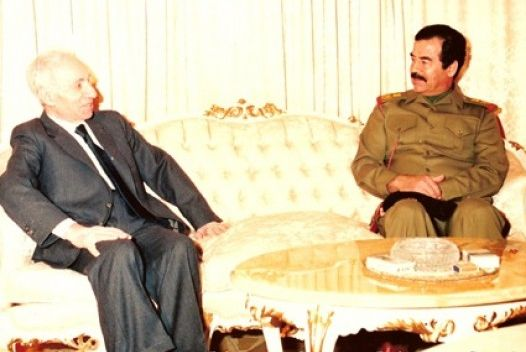
Saddam Hussein (right) talking with Michel Aflaq (left) in 1988

Saddamism is a political ideology based on the politics related to and pursued by Saddam Hussein. It has also been referred to by Iraqi politicians as Saddamist Ba'athism (Al-Baʽthiya Al-Saddamiyya). It is officially described as a distinct variation of Ba'athism. It espouses Iraqi nationalism and an Iraq-centred Arab world that calls upon Arab countries to adopt Saddamist Iraqi political discourse and to reject "the Nasserite discourse" that it claims collapsed after 1967. It is militarist and views political disputes and conflicts in a military manner as "battles" requiring "fighting", "mobilization", "battlefields", "bastions", and "trenches". Saddamism was officially supported by Saddam's government and promoted by the Iraqi daily newspaper Babil owned by Saddam's son Uday Hussein.

Saddam and his ideologists sought to fuse a pseudo-historical connection between ancient Babylonian and Assyrian civilization in Iraq with Arab nationalism by claiming that the ancient Babylonians and Assyrians were the ancestors of the Arabs. Thus, Saddam and his supporters claimed that there is no conflict between Mesopotamian heritage and Arab nationalism.

Saddamism ... is a phenomenon rooted in violence, in the manipulation of the tools and means of violence to achieve expressly political ends. Saddamism is not plain thuggery, as many people wrongly think; this is no Papa Doc or Idi Amin on the rampage. Saddamism is too political for that.—Kanan Makiya

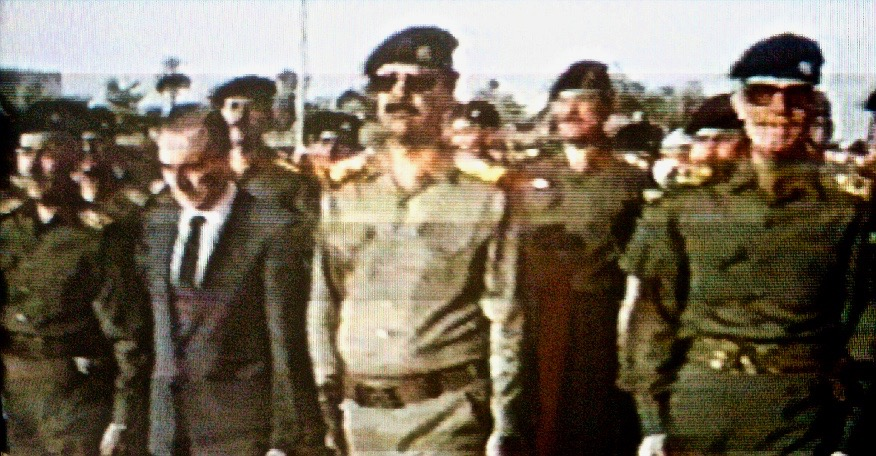
From left to right: Taha Yasin Ramadan, Shibli al-Aysami, Saddam Hussein, Izzat at-Duri. Iraqi and Syrian Ba'athist leaders (of the pro-Iraqi Ba'ath Party) during the funeral of Michel Aflaq in 1989.

Saddam's government was critical of Marxism and opposed the orthodox Marxist concepts of class conflict, dictatorship of the proletariat, and state atheism, as well as opposing Marxism–Leninism's claim that non-Marxist–Leninist parties are inherently bourgeois in nature. Rather, the party claimed that it was a popular revolutionary movement, so the people rejected petit bourgeois politics. Saddam claimed that the Arab nation did not have the class structure which existed in other nations and that class divisions were more along national lines between Arabs and non-Arabs rather than within the Arab community. However, he spoke fondly of Vladimir Lenin and commended Lenin for giving Russian socialism a uniquely Russian specificity that Marx alone was incapable of doing. He also expressed admiration for other communist leaders such as Fidel Castro, Hồ Chí Minh, and Josip Broz Tito due to their spirit of asserting national independence rather than their communism.

== Controversy ==
"The Ba’athist triumph gifted Syria and Iraq decades of tyranny, termed ‘security and stability’ (al-amn wa al-istiqrar). Both countries endured clan-based autocracies wielding ideological absolutism, malignancy of a different order from the standard republican and monarchical authoritarianism of the late twentieth-century Arab world. Strongmen swiftly emerged in the Ba’athist milieu to establish family firms... Subordination of the party, however, went together with rigorous deployment of the party apparatus and ideology to regiment society."— Prof. William Harris, University of Otago

=== Allegations of fascism ===
Cyprian Blamires, a historian of fascism, claims that "Ba'athism may have been a Middle Eastern variant of fascism, even though Aflaq and other Ba'athist leaders criticized particular fascist ideas and practices". According to him, the Ba'ath movement shared several characteristics with the European fascist movements, such as "the attempt to synthesize radical, illiberal nationalism and non-Marxist socialism, a romantic, mythopoetic, and elitist 'revolutionary' vision, the desire to create a 'new man' and restore past greatness, a centralised authoritarian party divided into 'right-wing' and 'left-wing' factions and so forth; several close associates later admitted that Aflaq had been directly inspired by certain fascist and Nazi theorists". Others have argued against Aflaq's fascist credentials, based on the facts that he was an active member of the Syrian–Lebanese Communist Party, that he participated in the activities of the French Communist Party during his stay in France, and that he was influenced by some of the ideas of Karl Marx.

According to Sami al-Jundi, one of the co-founders of the Arab Ba'ath Party which was established by Zaki Arsuzi, the party's emblem was the tiger because it would "excite the imagination of the youth, in the tradition of Nazism and Fascism, but taking into consideration the fact that the Arab is in his nature distant from pagan symbols [like the swastika]". Arsuzi's Ba'ath Party believed in the virtues of "one leader" and Arsuzi himself personally believed in the racial superiority of the Arabs. The party's members read Nazi literature, such as The Foundations of the Nineteenth Century; they were one of the first groups to plan the translation of Mein Kampf into Arabic; and they also actively searched for a copy of The Myth of the Twentieth Century—according to Moshe Ma'oz, the only copy of it was in Damascus and it was owned by Aflaq. Arsuzi did not support the Axis powers and refused Italy's advances for party-to-party relations, but he was also influenced by the racial theories of racialist philosopher Houston Stewart Chamberlain. Arsuzi claimed that historically, Islam and Muhammad had reinforced the nobility and purity of the Arabs, which had both degenerated because Islam had been adopted by other peoples. He was associated with the League of Nationalist Action, a political party which existed in Syria from 1932 to 1939 and was strongly influenced by fascism and Nazism, as evidenced by its paramilitary "Ironshirts".

Journalist Jonathan Teperman interviewed former Syrian president Bashar al-Assad in 2015 and described him to be as delusional as "Hitler in his bunker when the Russians were an hour outside Berlin" for advocating unrealistic objectives and being remorseless about his crimes, despite losing most of his Syrian territories.

The Simon Wiesenthal Center reported that Nazi war-criminal Alois Brunner, the right-hand man of Adolf Eichman and a key participant in the Final Solution, had died in Syria in 2010 under the asylum of Bashar al-Assad. Under the alias "Dr. Georg Fischer", Brunner assisted former Syrian rulers Bashar al-Assad and his father Hafez for over 30 years, serving as an instructor on torture techniques, combating internal dissent, and purging Syria's Jewish community. While the Assad regime regularly reject accusations of sheltering Brunner to this day, it had long denied permission to probe his whereabouts.

Bashar al-Assad's Ba'athist regime received support from Western neo-Nazi and far-right extremists, who became aware of him during the European refugee crisis that was mostly brought on by the Syrian Civil War. Assad's bombings of Syrian cities were praised in the far-right's Islamophobic propaganda, which portrayed Muslims as a civilizational enemy to the West. Several Western far-right groups also view Bashar al-Assad as an authoritarian, anti-semitic bulwark against globalism and Zionism. Several pro-Assadist slogans were chanted in the neo-Nazi Unite the Right rally held in Charlottesville in 2017. (Note: Sources: Elba, Mariam (8 September 2017). "Mariam Elba". The Intercept. Archived from the original on 5 October 2017.; Strickland, Patrick (14 February 2018). "Why do Italian fascists adore Syria's Bashar al-Assad?". Al Jazeera. Archived from the original on 5 January 2023.; Snell, James (17 August 2017). "Why Nazis from Charlottesville to Europe love Bashar al-Assad". New Arab. Archived from the original on 27 December 2022.; Ayoub, Joey (3 October 2022). "How the European far right coopted an Arabic letter". Al Jazeera. Archived from the original on 20 December 2022.; "Western Far-right Worries Syrians and Delights Bashar al-Assad". The Syrian Observer. 3 November 2022. Archived from the original on 3 November 2022.; Huetlin, Josephine (28 March 2018). "The European Far-Right's Sick Love Affair With Bashar al-Assad". The Daily Beast. Archived from the original on 16 November 2022.) Neo-Nazi militants from the Greek Strasserist group Black Lily joined the Syrian civil war to fight alongside the Syrian Arab Army.

=== Allegations of racism ===
The Ba'ath regimes have been accused of promoting an aggressive form of Arab ultranationalism.

The National Vanguard Party, which has ties to the Iraqi Ba'ath party, was accused of being racist by the Mauritanian government and certain political groups.

The Iraqi Regional Branch could either approve or disapprove of marriages between party members, and in a party document, party branches were ordered "to thoroughly check the Arabic origin of not only the prospective wife but also her family, and no approval should be given to members who plan to marry [someone] of non-Arab origin". During the war with Iran, the party began to confront members who were of non-Arab, especially Iranian origin. One memo which was directly sent from the party Secretariat to Saddam read, "the party suffers from the existence of members who are not originally Arabs as this might constitute a danger to the party in the future". The Secretariat recommended that people who were of Iranian origin not be allowed to become party members. In his reply to the document, Saddam wrote, "1) [I] Agree with the opinion of the Party Secretariat; 2) To be discussed in the [Regional] Command meeting". All of those who were denied membership, and all of those whose memberships were revoked, were loyal Ba'athists. For instance, one Ba'athist of Iranian origin whose membership in the party was revoked had been a member of the party since 1958, had also participated in the Ramadan Revolution, and he had even been imprisoned by the authorities in the aftermath of the November 1963 Iraqi coup d'état because he supported the Ba'athist cause. Later, the authorities began to specifically look for people of Iraqi origin, and any contact which they had with Iran and/or Iranians functioned as a sufficient reason to forbid them from being party members.

== Works cited ==
- Ali, Tariq (2003). The Clash of Fundamentalisms: Crusades, Jihads and Modernity. Verso. ISBN 978-1859844571.
- Bengio, Ofra (1998). Saddam's Word: Political Discourse in Iraq. Oxford University Press. ISBN 978-0195151855.
- Ben-Tzur, Avraham (1968). "The Neo-Ba'th Party of Syria". Journal of Contemporary History. 3 (3): 161–181. doi:10.1177/002200946800300310. S2CID 159345006.
- Blamires, Cyprian (2006). World Fascism: A Historical Encyclopedia. Vol. 1. ABC-CLIO. ISBN 9781576079409.
- Choueiri, Youssef (2000). Arab nationalism: a History: Nation and State in the Arab World. Wiley-Blackwell. ISBN 978-0631217299.
- Commins, David Dean (2004). Historical Dictionary of Syria (2nd ed.). Scarecrow Press. ISBN 978-0810849341.
- Coughlin, Con (2005). Saddam: His Rise and Fall. Harper Perennial. ISBN 978-0060505431.
- Curtis, Michel (1971). People and Politics in the Middle East. Transaction Publishers. ISBN 978-0878555000.
- Devlin, John F. (1975). The Ba'th Party: A History from its origins to 1966 (2nd ed.). Hoover Institution Press. ISBN 978-0817965617.
- Ghareeb, Edmund; Dougherty, Beth (2004). Historical Dictionary of Iraq. Scarecrow Press. ISBN 978-0810843301.
- Ginat, Rami (2010). Syria and the Doctrine of Arab Neutralism: From Independence to Dependence (2 ed.). Sussex Academic Press. ISBN 978-1845193966.
- Hannah, Sami; Gardner, George (1969). Arab Socialism: A Documentary Survey. Brill Archive. ASIN B0007DTQ2S.
- Harris, William (1997). Challenges to Democracy in the Middle East. Markus Wiener Publishers. ISBN 978-1-55876-149-0.
- Hinnebusch, Raymond (2002). Syria: Revolution from Above. Routledge. ISBN 978-0415267793.
- Hopwood, Derek (1988). Syria 1945–1986: Politics and Society. Routledge. ISBN 978-0-04-445046-7.
- Korany, Baghat; Dessouki, Ali (2010). The Foreign Policies of Arab States: The Challenge of Globalization. American University in Cairo Press. ISBN 978-977-416-360-9.
- Laqueur, Walter (1969). The Struggle for the Middle East: The Soviet Union and the Middle East, 1958–68. Routledge. ISBN 9780710066367.
- Jones, Jeremy (2007). Negotiating Change: The New Politics of the Middle East. I.B. Tauris. ISBN 978-1845112707.
- Maʻoz, Moshe (2005). Arab-Jewish Relations: From Conflict to Resolution?: Essays in Honour of Moshe Maʻoz. Sussex Academic Press. ISBN 9781903900680.
- al-Marashi, Ibrahim; Salama, Sammy (2008). Iraq's Armed Forces: an Analytical History. Routledge. ISBN 978-0-415-40078-7.
- Niblock, Tim (1982). Iraq, the contemporary state. Croom Helm, Ltd. ISBN 978-0-7099-1810-3.
- Perthes, Volker (1997). The Political Economy of Syria under Asad. I.B.Tauris. ISBN 978-1860641923.
- Pipes, Daniel (1992). Greater Syria: The History of an Ambition. Oxford University Press. ISBN 978-0195060225.
- Mackey, Sandra (2003). The Reckoning: Iraq and the Legacy of Saddam Hussein. W.W. Norton and Co. ISBN 978-0-393-32428-0.
- Ruthven, Malise (2006). Islam in the World. Oxford University Press. ISBN 978-0195138412.
- Salem, Paul (1994). Bitter Legacy: Ideology and Politics in the Arab World. Syracuse University Press. ISBN 978-0-8156-2628-2.
- Sassoon, Joseph (2012). Saddam Hussein's Ba'th Party: Inside an Authoritarian Regime (1st ed.). Cambridge University Press. ISBN 978-0521149150.
- Seddon, David (2006). A Political and Economic Dictionary of Africa. Taylor & Francis. ISBN 1-85743-212-6.
- Viorst, Milton (1995). Sandcastles: The Arabs in Search of the Modern World. Syracuse University Press. ISBN 978-0224033237.
- Walt, Stephen (1987). The Origins of Alliances. Cornell University Press. ISBN 978-0801494185.
