= Assadism =

Far-left political ideology based on the ideas of the Assad family

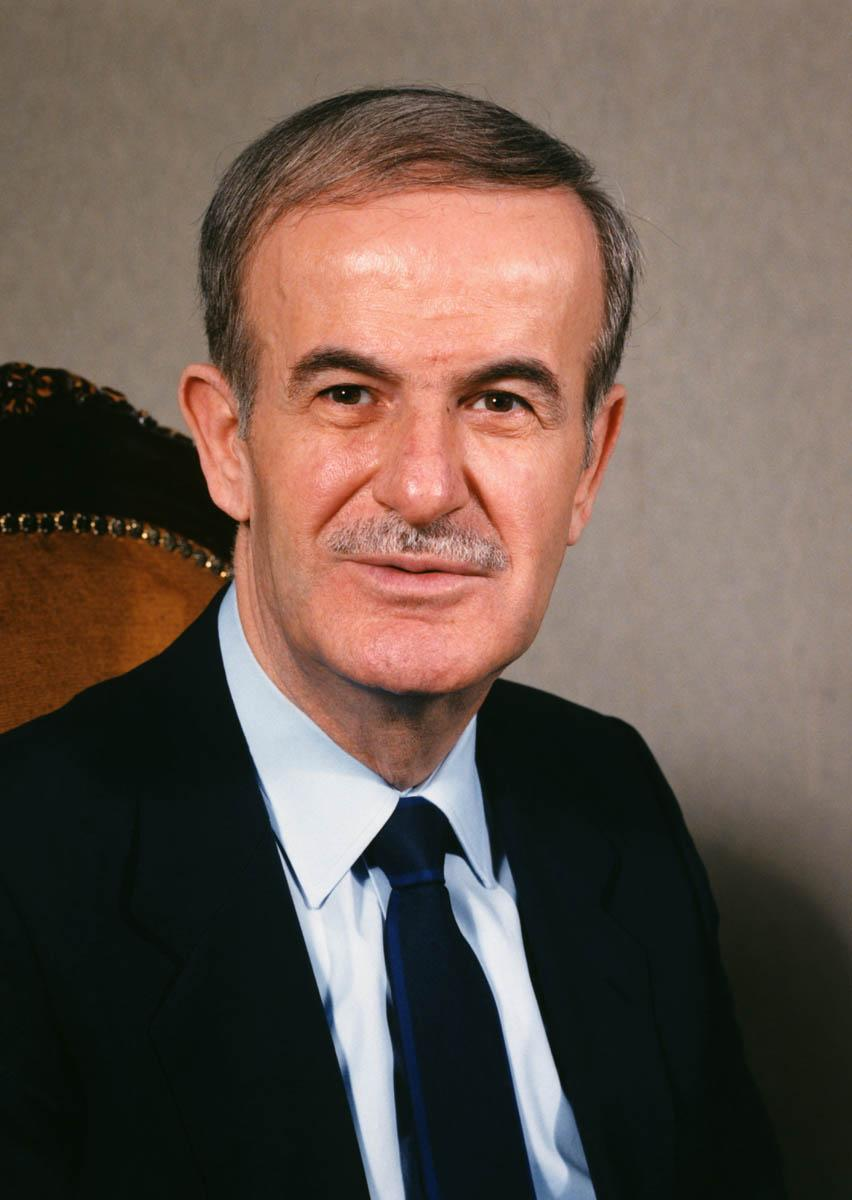
Hafez al-Assad
President of Syria (1971–2000)

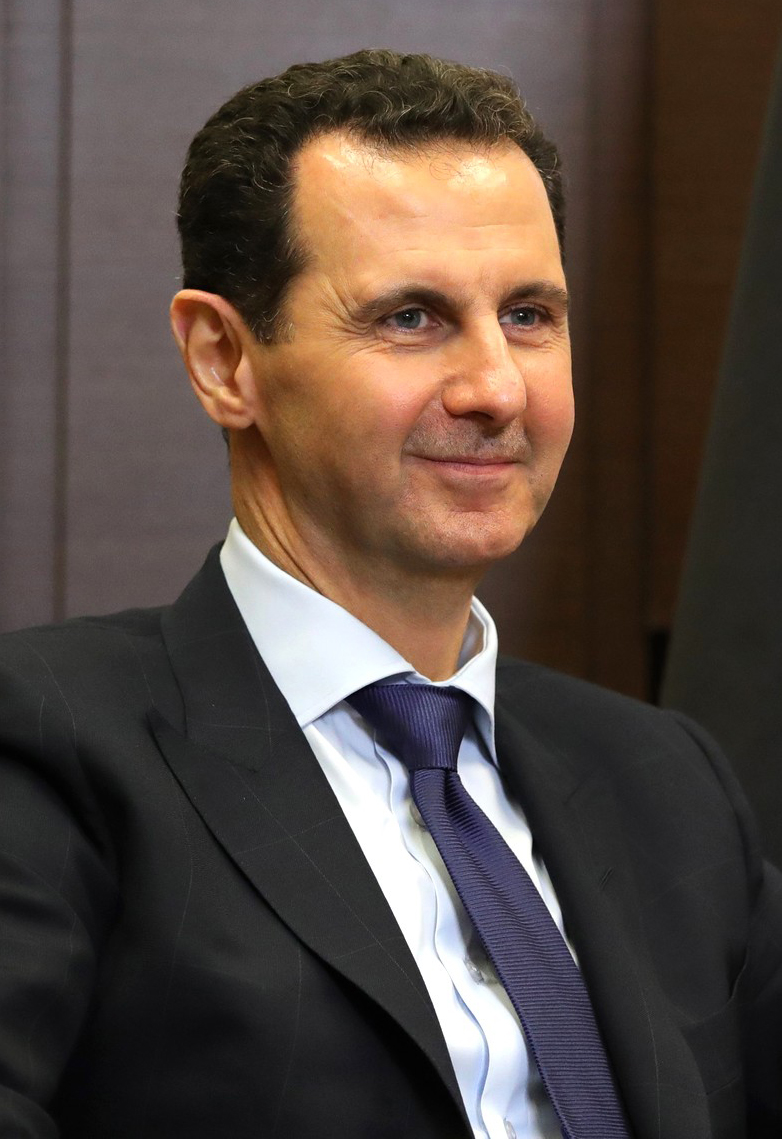
Bashar al-Assad
President of Syria (2000–2024)

Assadism (Arabic: أسدية, romanized: ʾAsadiyah) or Assadist Ba'athism is a variant of neo-Ba'athism based on the policies and thinking of the Assad family, which governed Syria as a totalitarian hereditary dictatorship from 1971 to 2024. Assadism was characterized by Arab nationalism, totalitarianism, socialism during the Cold War, and a cult of personality around the Assad family, while neoliberalism was adopted after the end of the Cold War.

This period spanned the successive regimes of Hafez al-Assad and his son Bashar al-Assad. The Assads rose to power as a result of the 1970 Syrian coup d'état, leading to the consolidation of Alawite minority dominance within the military and security forces. Their governance was largely characterized by nepotism, sectarianism, and ethnic favoritism.

The ideology enshrines the Assad family's leadership role in Syrian politics and presented the Assad regime in a very personalist fashion, creating a government based upon and revolving around its leader. Under this system, the Syrian Ba'ath Party portrayed the wisdom of Assad as "beyond the comprehension of the average citizen." Syrian state propaganda cast Assadism as a neo-Ba'athist current that evolved Ba'athist ideology with the needs of the modern era.

The Assad family cultivated extensive patronage networks, securing loyalty while monopolizing vast portions of the Syrian economy and fostering widespread corruption. The Syrian Ba'ath party used its control over Syria's political, social, economic, cultural, educational and religious spheres to enforce its neo-Ba'athist ideology in the wider society and preserve the Assad family's grip on power. Hafez al-Assad's goal upon coming to power was to consolidate the socialist state with the Ba'ath party as its vanguard by establishing a "coup-proof" system that eliminated factional rivalries. As soon as he seized power, the armed forces, secret police, security forces, and bureaucracy were purged, subjugating them to party command by installing Alawite elites loyal to Assad.

To maintain control, the regime had shifted toward the use of brute force and relentless oppression by the early 1980s, though Assadism initially attempted to solve problems within the country through political maneuvering in 1970s, exemplified by the Hama massacre in 1982 and the several sectarian massacres over the course of the Syrian civil war since 2011. Following the fall of the Assad regime in 2024 as a result of a Syrian opposition offensive amid the civil war, Assadists loyal to the former regime have engaged in an insurgency across Alawite strongholds in western Syria.

== History ==
=== Pre-1970 ===
Prior to Hafez al-Assad's seizure of power in 1970, the neo-Ba'athist movement in Syria had been dominated by strongman Salah Jadid, who came to power after a successful coup in 1966.

Salah Jadid pursued a very radical Marxist–Leninist policy internally, and aggressive and interventionist externally. In the end, his uncompromising radicalism and brutal imposition of his ideas alienated almost all layers of Syrian society, as well as members of the ruling party, who believed that the situation required a more moderate approach: The latter united around Hafez al-Assad, who was opposed to Jadid's adventurism.

Tensions between Jadid and Assad increased following the Six-Day War in 1967 and invasion of Jordan in 1970. The conflict was not limited to heated debates at party meetings and congresses, sometimes escalating into military clashes between supporters of both parties (in particular between pro-Assad elements in the army and the Palestinian fedayeen group as-Sa'iqa, which supported the Jadid regime), especially in 1969. Hafez al-Assad took advantage of his control over the military to dismantle Jadid's support network, before carrying out a coup and imprisoning Jadid and then Syrian president Nureddin al-Atassi.

=== After 1970 coup ===
After Assad seized power, the ideology of neo-Ba'athism transformed into Assadism, with even greater nationalism, militarism and the now established cult of personality of the Assad family. Assadism is very different from the ideas propagated by the original leaders of the Ba'athist movement, Michel Aflaq and Salah al-Din al-Bitar, which caused them great dissatisfaction with such an ideological transformation. Assad set upon a project of rapid institution-building, reopened parliament, and adopted a permanent constitution for the country, which had been ruled by military fiat and a provisional constitutional documents since 1963.

Political participation was limited to the National Progressive Front, the ruling coalition of Syrian Ba'ath and Marxist–Leninist parties; entrenching itself firmly within the Soviet Bloc. The Party also began building a personality cult around Assad and brought the elite of the armed forces under Assad's grip and the officer corps were installed with Alawite loyalists, further alienating the Sunni majority from the party.

The Ba'athists initially pursued a very militaristic policy aimed at some kind of "mobilization of the nation to fight against the Israeli enemy." But under Assad, militarism reached new heights. Following the Syrian loss during the Six-Day War with Israel, Hafez initiated a huge expansion of the military to achieve military parity with Israel. Assad gave a high priority to building a strong military and preparing it for a confrontation with Israel, both for offensive and defensive purposes and to enable him to politically negotiate the return of the Golan Heights from a position of military strength. He allocated up to 70 percent of the annual budget to the military build-up and received large quantities of modern arms from the Soviet Union. The Syrian Arab Army, which was mainly a conscripted force, increased from 50,000 personnel in 1967 to 225,000 in 1973, and to over 350,000 by the 1990s.

==== Yom Kippur War ====
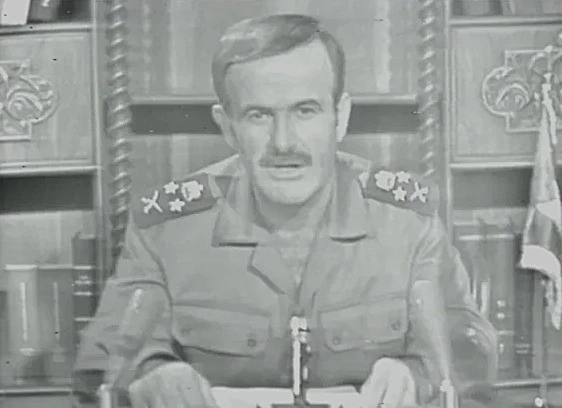
Hafez Assad declares war on Israel in his TV speech on October 6.

In 1973, Syria, together with Egypt, launched an almost successful war against Israel: despite facing stiffer resistance than their Egyptian allies, the Syrian army was able to break through the Israeli defenses. However, due to the lack of coordination and the Egyptian operational pause from October 7 to 14, Syria faced the full fury of the Israeli forces (who learned of Egypt's modest strategy) and were forced to retreat. Israel again invaded Syrian territory, the Bashan region, hoping to reach Damascus. However, Syria was able to stop its advance and a war of attrition began, which lasted until May 1974, when Syria signed a disengagement agreement. Although Syria did not liberate the Golan Heights, its army was not defeated, which earned Assad respect inside Syria and abroad.

==== Islamist uprising ====
Bitterness towards the Assadist regime and the Alawite elite in the neo-Ba'ath and armed forces became widespread amongst the Sunni majority, laying the beginnings of a Sunni Islamic resistance. Prominent leaders of Muslim Brotherhood like Issam al-Attar were imprisoned and exiled. A coalition of the traditional Syrian Sunni ulema, Muslim Brotherhood revolutionaries and Islamist activists formed the Syrian Islamic Front in 1980 with objective of overthrowing Assad through Jihad and establishing an Islamic state. In the same year, Hafez officially supported Iran in its war with Iraq and controversially began importing Iranian fighters and terror groups into Lebanon and Syria. This led to rising social tensions within the country which eventually became a full-fledged Islamist rebellion in 1976–1982; led by the Fighting Vanguard and local Muslim Brotherhood movement. The regime responded by slaughtering the Sunni inhabitants in Hama and Aleppo and bombarding numerous mosques, killing around 20,000–40,000 civilians. The uprising was brutally crushed and the Muslim Brotherhood armed movement was demolished. After the uprising the government resumed its version of militaristic Leninism, repealing liberalization introduced when Assad came to power.

== Ideology's tenets ==
=== Militarism ===
The Assadist regime was characterized by a very large-scale militarization of the entire Syrian society (both men and women, as can be seen from the military parades held in Syria) and a highly militaristic propaganda in the media and education system, mixed with the personality cult of Hafez al-Assad (and later Bashar). The degree of Assadist's militarism of was indecently high: Syria's air force and tank fleets were not much smaller (if not larger) than those of large European countries. In 1979, Syria was one of the four largest arms importers in the world (between 1961 and 1979, it imported weapons worth $7.4 billion, one of the highest figures). Even if a person has not yet served in the army and is a student, he will eventually receive some military training, such as assembling weapons, in schools run by Assadist youth organizations (such as the Revolutionary Youth Union), membership in which was mandatory. These organizations would mobilize boys through enforced training and then membership of paramilitary groups.

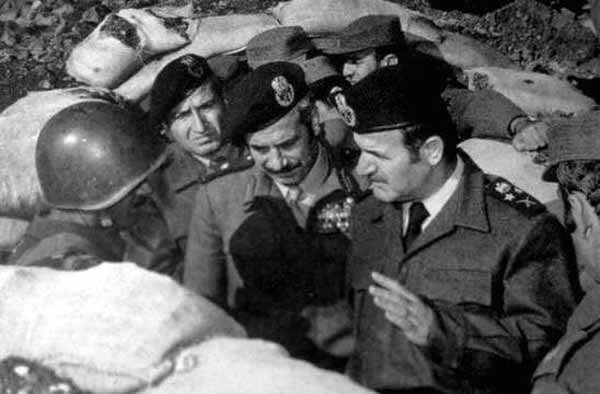
Hafez and Mustafa Tlass on the Golan front, October 1973.

Organizations like the RYU also carried out intensive ideological training and spread of Assadist ideas in schools, helping to create "ideologically correct" youth. School students also were taught Ba'athism and Assadism through a course known as "Political Arab Sociology". Students sat through a lesson every week about how to become an "active Ba'athist" and how to show their love for both the nation and the leader, particularly through celebrating a physically strong body and military training. A compulsory 15-day summer camp gave to male students extra time to learn about the soldiers life, in an attempt to prepare them for compulsory army conscription when they finished high school. During enforced marches to celebrate the “great leader”, at the time, Bashar al-Assad's father, Hafez, Syrians learned by heart the slogan: “With blood and soul, we sacrifice ourselves for you, Hafez.” According to the Constitution of Syria of 1973, Chapter 3: Educational and Cultural Principles, Article 21, it is written:

The educational and cultural system aims at creating a socialist nationalist Arab generation which is scientifically minded and attached to its history and land, proud of its heritage, and filled with the spirit of struggle to achieve its nation's objectives of unity, freedom, and socialism, and to serve humanity and its progress.

=== Neo-Ba'athism ===
Neo-Ba'athism is a far-left version of Ba'athism that originated in Syria. Gradually, neo-Ba'athist military officers led by General Salah Jadid ousted less radical Ba'athists and Aflaqites from all important positions in the traditional civilian elites, government, army and intelligence services since 1963 coup, strengthening their power in the ruling party, but they finally consolidated their power after a military coup in 1966, overthrowing a National Command, driving Michel Aflaq and his supporters out of Syria.

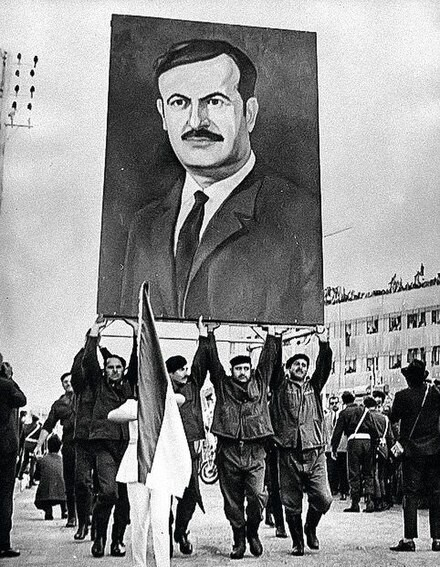
Syrians marching with gigantic portrait of the Syrian president in 1980s

Neo-Ba'athism is very different from the original ideas of the old Ba'athists, including the increased role of the military and the purging of the leadership from members of the old guard – Aflaq and al-Bitar. The Neo-Ba'athists were heavily influenced by the ideas of Marxism–Leninism, which put this ideology on the verge of communism: neo-Ba'athist regime espoused radical leftist doctrines such as war Leninism and revolutionary socialism, prioritised "internal revolution", abandoned pan-Arabism, sought to strengthen ties with the Soviet Union, and came into conflict with such ideologies as Arab nationalism, Nasserism, and Iraqi Ba'athism.

The rise of the neo-Ba'athists to power in Syria caused the deepest split in the Ba'athist movement: the party divided into two factions, Syrian and Iraqi, and the Syrian became independent from the National Command, which it overthrew. The neo-Ba'athists condemned Aflaq and accused him of "stealing" ideology from Zaki al-Arsuzi, sentencing him to death in absentia (along with al-Bitar), while Iraqi Ba'athists continued to consider Aflaq the creator of that ideology.

Domestically, the Jadid regime pursued a highly anti-religious policy: it imposed severe restrictions on religious freedom, persecuted the clergy, labeled religious clerics as class enemies, and government officials and party mass media preached about the dangers of religion and its imminent demise through socialist revolution. The Neo-Ba'athist regime also pursued very active attempts at radical socialist transformation, for example by confiscating the property of businessmen, merchants and landowners. Its relations with most of the Arab world remained largely poor: its interventionist policies and calls for the overthrow of reactionary governments (especially Jordan and Saudi Arabia) alienated most of its neighbors. The neo-Ba'athist regime was very active in supporting the Maoist concept of "people's war," which was expressed in its huge support for leftist Palestinian fedayeen groups, granting them considerable autonomy and allowing them to carry out attacks on Israel from Syrian territory.

But after his rise to power, Assad eased the government's repressive and radical policies. Although Assad supported many of Jadid's ideas, he rejected the aggressive imposition of its radical ideas in Syria. He abolished persecution of religion and made overtures to the Writers' Union, rehabilitating those who had been forced underground, jailed or sent into exile for representing what radical Ba'athists called the reactionary classes. He cut prices for basic foodstuffs 15 percent, which won him support from ordinary citizens, and the confiscation of goods under Jadid was reversed. The urban middle class, which had been hurt by the Jadid's policy, had new economic opportunities. His reign was marked by the virtual abandonment of Pan-Arab ideology; replacing it with the doctrine of socialist transformation and giving overriding priority in constructing socialist society within Syria. However, despite the abandonment of pan-Arabism and Nasserism, Assad often represented himself as a successor to Gamal Abdel Nasser: he modelled his presidential system on Nasser's and hailed Nasser for his pan-Arab leadership. In addition to Assad's ambition to turn Syria into a regional power and for himself to become a pan-Arab leader, Assad calculated that working for Arab unity and stepping up the struggle against Israel were likely to strengthen his legitimacy and leadership among the various sections of the Syrian population. The Assadists actively promoted the values of Arab socialism, but the regime's policy in this regard changed several times: from the implementation of socialism itself to ideas bordering on communism or on the contrary, reforms encouraging capitalism. In the 1980s, Assad brought back the Leninist ideology that had existed under Jadid, but with the collapse of the Soviet Union in the 1990s, he began economic and political liberalization again.

The neo-Ba'athist ideology continued to largely determine the regime's policies on socialism and nationalism, albeit with some differences. For example, already in the first three years of Assad’s rule, all attempts at collectivization, proposed under Jadid, were stopped, and state farms were mostly disbanded.

=== Nationalism ===
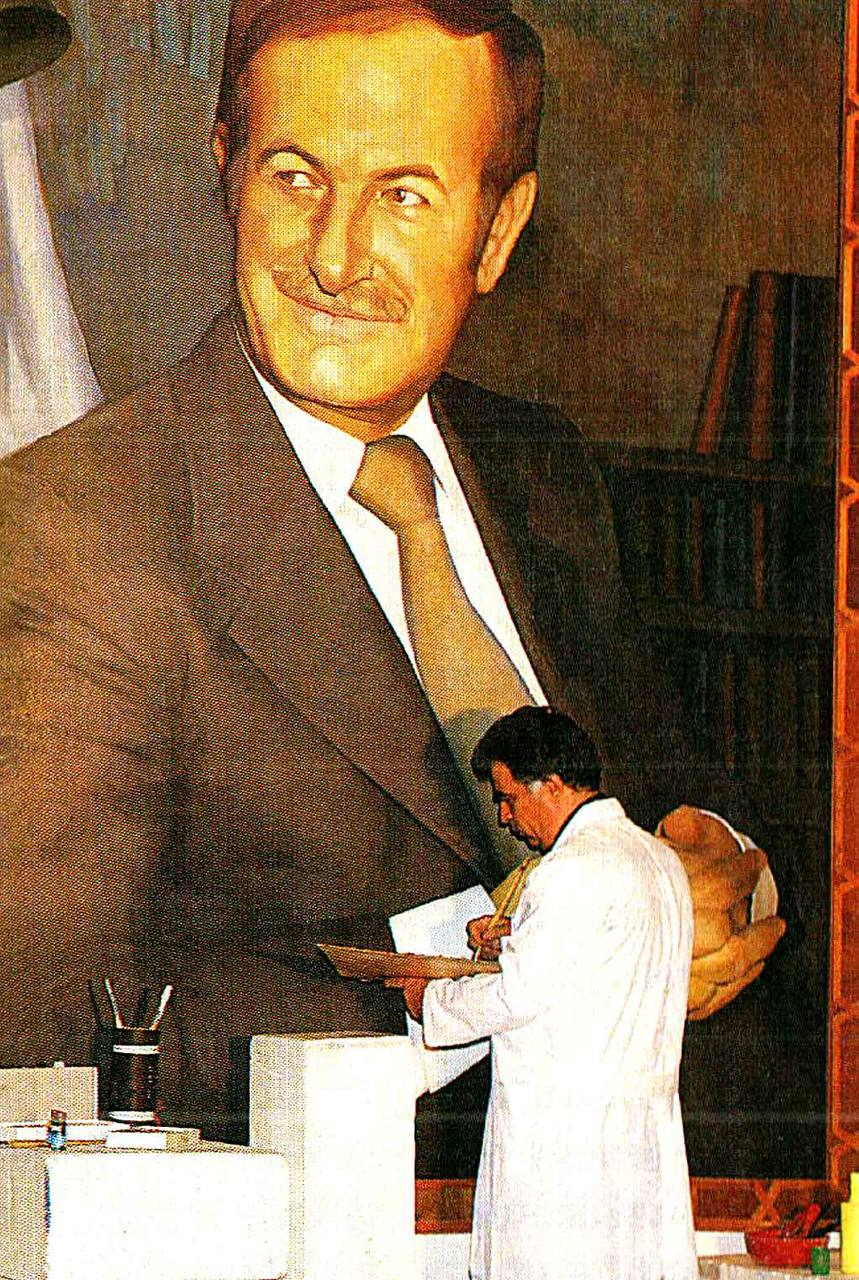
Syrian artist paints a huge portrait of President Assad in 1974

Assadism is a complex mixture of several conflicting ideas: Syrian nationalism, Arab nationalism and pan-Arabism.

Formally, Hafez al-Assad declared the goals of achieving pan-Arab unity and Arab nationalism, but in reality these ideas faded into the background and remained in the ideology more for show. Syria's relations with a considerable number of Arab countries were bad for a long period of time, which in itself did not allow pan-Arab beliefs to be realized in practice: Ba'athist Syria invaded Jordan, Lebanon and Iraq in different periods of time. In addition, Assadist Syria became an important ally of non-Arab Iran and sided with it in the Iran-Iraq War, supporting it with arms supplies and closing Iraqi oil pipelines (apart from it, only South Yemen and Libya supported Iran). Syria retained very aggressive views on the Arab-Israeli conflict, although many other Arab countries reoriented their attention to Iran. In practice, the ideas of Assadism went towards a mixture of Syrian and leftist nationalism.

Jamal al-Atassi, co-founder of Zaki al-Arsuzi's early Arab Ba'ath Party and later Syrian dissident, stated that "Assadism is a false nationalism. It's the domination of a minority, and I'm not talking just of the Alawites, who control the society's nervous system. I include also the army and the mukhabarat... And despite its socialist slogans, the state is run by a class who has made a fortune without contributing—a nouvelle bourgeoisie parasitaire." The Assad family aligned itself with Iran and its Axis of Resistance for much of its rule, contributing to an inter-Ba'athist rivalry with the Sunni-dominated Saddamist Ba'ath Party in Iraq. Describing Assadism as a quasi-religion fostered by the Ba'athist state for mobilising the fealty and adulation of Syrian citizens, Professor of Middle Eastern Studies at Bonn International Centre Dr. Esther Meininghaus wrote:

"by drawing on religion, the Assad regime successfully sought to promote a value system ultimately rooted in the Baʿathist vision for Syrian society .... To this, we can indeed add the cult surrounding Presidents Hafez and Bashar al-Asad, whose pictures are displayed not only in public buildings and schools but taxis and shops, or ceremonies such as mass parades and/or the playing of the national anthem during official celebrations. Also, official rhetoric has become increasingly infused with transcendental and metaphysical elements, in particular with regard to the President's personality cult. For instance, the President is addressed as the 'Eternal Leader' who will guide his people to becoming the 'true' Arab nation. The recent slogan of 'Bashar, Allah, Suriyya wa-bas' (Bashar, God, and Syria – that's it) possibly best epitomises how close the regime has come to creating a Syrian public religion in its own right. Whether the outward performance of 'regime rituals' was actually fully internalised or secretly mocked, it had to be practised and obeyed."

=== Al-infitah ala al-Sha'ab ===
Al-infitah ala al-Sha'ab was one of the central slogans and remarkable declared idea of Assadism a gave a significant support for Hafez al-Assad after coming to power. The idea behind the slogan was to open the government to the people, and the initial, relaxing reforms succeeded in achieving greater citizen participation in governance and decision-making. The slogan concerned both politics and economics: the relaxing reforms of the 1970s were part of the policies of infiraj and al-infitah ala al-Sha'ab, which were a part of Corrective Movement program.

=== Ta'addudiyya ===
Ta'addudiyya was the declared policy of Hafez al-Assad's government and his Corrective Movement program, emphasizing political and economic pluralism. The word "Ta'addudiyya" itself translates from Arabic as "pluralism." The essence of the policy was Syria's shift away from a one-party system toward a more "pluralistic" multi-party system: The Ba'ath Party banned all other political parties since coming to power in 1963. This was expressed, for example, in the creation of a coalition of socialist parties known as the National Progressive Front. In addition, Ta'addudiyya, along with the infiraj policy, allowed private companies to invest in the public sector of the Syrian economy. As the government claimed, the policy of Ta'addudiyya provided greater representation for the people and greater investment opportunities for the economy. However, the Ba'ath Party still remained dominant in determining policy and social change, and the Ta'addudiyya reforms were largely directly controlled by it.

=== infiraj ===
Al-infiraj, sometimes called infitah, was a socialist policy of limited economic liberalization pursued intermittently by Hafez al-Assad. The goal of the infiraj policy was to attract foreign and private investment to Syria.

== Assadist policies ==
=== Economic reforms ===
The Assadists have changed the direction of their economic policy several times. By the mid-1960s, government-sponsored land reform and nationalization of major industries and foreign investments had confirmed the new socialist direction of Syria's economic policy. As the state assumed greater control over economic decision-making by adopting centralized planning and strictly regulating commercial transactions, Syria experienced a substantial loss of skilled workers, administrators, and their capital. Despite the political upheavals, which undermined the confidence of landowners, merchants, and industrialists, the state successfully implemented large-scale development projects to expand industry, agriculture, and infrastructure.

By the 1970s, 85% of agricultural lands were distributed to landless peasant populations and tenant farmers. Banks, oil companies, power production and 90% of large-scale industries were nationalized. By the end of the 1970s, the economy had shifted from its traditional agrarian base to an economy dominated by the service, industrial, and commercial sectors. Massive expenditures for development of irrigation, electricity, water, road building projects, irisin plants and expansion of health services and education to rural areas contributed to prosperity. However, Syria remained noticeably dependent on foreign aid to support its rapidly growing military and arms spending. By the mid-1980s, the country's economic climate had shifted from prosperity to austerity, as a result of the rapid fall of world oil prices, lower export revenues, drought affecting agricultural production, and falling worker remittances. Also, Arab aid levels decreased very much because of economic retrenchment in the oil-producing states and Syrian support for Iran in the Iran–Iraq War.

In the 1990s, as the Cold War came to a close and the USSR collapsed, the Assad government instituted a series of economic reforms, although the economy remained highly regulated. These reforms began the end of Arab socialism in the Syrian state, favouring an opening up of the country to global investment and market reforms. The Syrian economy experienced strong growth throughout the 1990s, and into the 2000s. Following his assumption of power in 2000, Bashar al-Assad sought to frame his leadership around modernizing and opening the economy. He emphasized, in particular, "the need to modernize the regulatory environment and the industrial base, activate and encourage the private sector, remove bureaucratic obstacles to investment, increase job opportunities, qualify cadres, improve education and expand information technology." But Syria's economy has suffered a catastrophic collapse as a result of years of civil war.

=== Social reforms ===
When the Ba'ath Party took power in Syria in 1963, it pledged full equality between women and men as well as full workforce participation for women. Assadists continued those policies and increased women's role in society and the army. Although women are generally not required to serve in the military, for a time in the 1980s they were subject to mandatory military conscription on an equal basis with men. Women actively participated in military marches, demonstrations and in some military classes in schools (which is run by the RYU).

Although the previous government of Salah Jadid had been extremely anti-religious, the Assadists reversed its measures in this direction. Syria under the Assadists was one of the most secular and highly Westernized (in the civil sense) countries in the Arab world. The updated constitution of 1973 confirmed the secular direction of the new regime. All schools are government-run and non-sectarian, although there is mandatory religious instruction, provided in Islam and/or Christianity. Political forms of Islam are not tolerated by the government. Syria has separate secular and religious courts. Civil and criminal cases are heard in secular courts, while the Sharia courts handle personal, family, and religious matters in cases between Muslims or between Muslims and non-Muslim. Non-Muslim communities have their own religious courts using their own religious law.

=== Kurds policy ===
The Assadist government's treatment of the Kurds has been the subject of repeated outrage from international organizations such as Amnesty International and others.

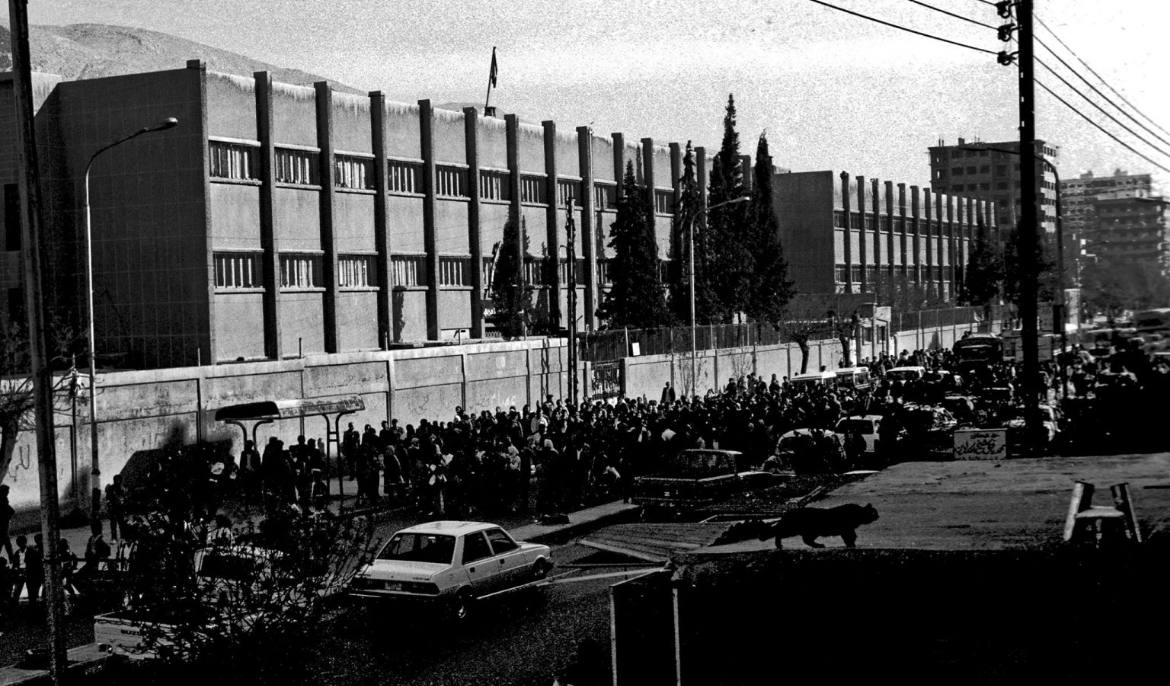
Kurds protest in Damascus against the decision to ban Nowruz celebrations, 1986

The Kurds in Syria had been victims of persecution and harassment by the government even before the Ba'ath Party or Assadists came to power, but it was they that toughened its policies in this regard. Although Kurdish was the second most widely spoken language after Arabic, it was officially banned from use, as were a number of other things related to it: for example, Kurds were prohibited from registering children with Kurdish names, opening businesses with Kurdish names, publishing books or publications in Kurdish, and building Kurdish private schools. Decree 768, introduced in 2000, additionally banned the sale of Kurdish-language cassettes and videos in stores.

From 1973 to 1976, the Assad regime carried out Arab Belt project - an Arabization campaign in the eastern Syrian province of al-Hasakah to the detriment of local ethnic groups (including Kurds), forcibly deporting the local population and settling Arab families there. While that proposals had officially been accepted by the Ba'athist government as early as 1965, it was Hafez who ordered the implementation of the Arab Belt programme in 1973. The project's name was changed by the Assad government to "Plan to establish model state farms in the Jazira region". As a result of the campaign, tens of thousands of Kurds were deported from Syria without the possibility of returning and replaced by Arab families, mostly from the neighboring Raqqa Governorate, and the Kurdish village names of the area were replaced by Arabic names not necessarily related to the traditions and history of the region.

=== Palestine policy ===
Assad, like all his predecessors, verbally spoke in unequivocal support of the Palestinian movement, against Zionism and the state of Israel: the Palestinian flag became second only to the Syrian flag in Syria. However, in reality, his policy towards Palestine and support for Palestinian militias was much more ambiguous: Assadist Syria has been very selective in its support to the Palestinians.

Under Jadid's rule, leftist Palestinian groups were given a lot of support, but Assad already considered this a bad decision: in his opinion, the militants were given too much autonomy in attacks on Israel, which provoked the Six-Day War.

The multi-factional organization known as the Palestine Liberation Organization was the main militant Palestinian group in the early decades, but its leaders had poor relations with Assadist Syria. Hafez al-Assad was known for his hostility towards Yasser Arafat and Faisal Husseini, with attempts to divide the Palestinian leadership.

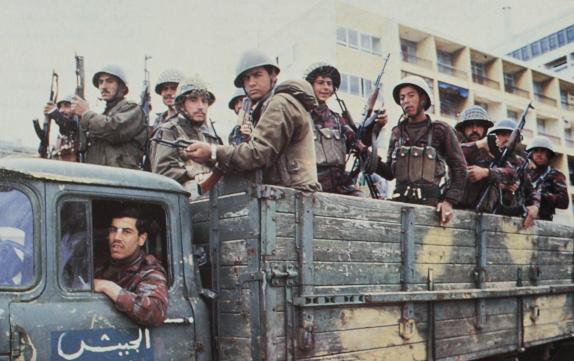
Syrian troops in Beirut during War of the Camps.

In 1975, a civil war broke out in neighboring Lebanon between various factions, including the PLO. Assad attempted to steer Arafat and the PLO away from Lebanon, threatening him with a cutoff of Syrian aid, but in a result the two sides were unable to reach an agreement. Already in 1976, Syria began a full-fledged intervention in the war, siding with the Maronites and against most Palestinian militants, which caused outrage not only among the Palestinians but also in the Arab world: one of the goals of the intervention was to return the PLO under Syrian influence. The Soviet Union tried to prevent the conflict between its two important allies, but it did not succeed. Assad supported the Palestine Liberation Army, which was much more under his control, which participated in clashes with the PLO (the PLA however proved unreliable when ordered to fight other Palestinians, and suffered from mass defections). Syria's operations against PLO militants have effectively put it on the same side as Israel, which had already begun supplying Maronite militias with weapons since the war began.

In the 1982 Lebanon War, Syria fought alongside the PLO against Israeli forces, but after the war, this short-lived alliance collapsed again. Syria also actively supported the Shiite Amal militia throughout the war, and sided with them in the War of the Camps, again fighting against PLO. Later, Assadist Syria prioritized supporting Hamas, a much more radical paramilitary group which are the enemy of PLO. The Assadists were also accused of massacres by their army against Lebanese (including Palestinians) who opposed the Syrian occupation of Lebanon.

=== Cult of personality ===
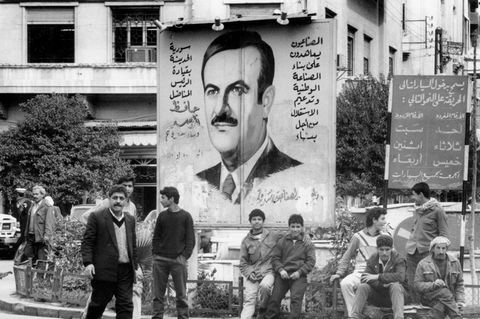
Graffiti depicting Hafez al-Assad, 1980s

The cult of personality of the Assad family in Syria was enormous. Statues, frescoes, portraits and other images of Hafez and Bashar al-Assad could be found everywhere. Hafez al-Assad developed his cult of personality in Stalinist style: ruling Ba'ath party initially manufactured Hafez al-Assad's cult of Arab socialist heroism in consultancy with Soviet state propagandists, mimicking the pervasive personality cults prevalent across Soviet Bloc dictatorships like Romania and North Korea. Beginning as a tool to bind every Syrian citizen with the obligation of undying loyalty (bay'ah) to Assad in 1970s, the propaganda was further intensified and personalist depictions reached new heights during the 1980s. Through kindergarten, school books, educational institutions and Ba'athist media; Assadist propaganda constructed the image of a homogenous Arab nation protected by a fatherly leader revelling under the "cult of Saladin". Assad regime venerates Hafez al-Assad's personalist iconography perpetually in the public and private spheres of everyday Syrian life. Ba'athist propaganda portrayed Hafez al-Assad as a strong leader whose wisdom was "beyond the comprehension of the average citizen." Syrian state propaganda also cast Assadism as a neo-Ba'athist current that evolved Ba'athist ideology with the needs of the modern era.

In schools, children were taught to sing songs of adulation about Hafez al-Assad. Teachers began each lesson with the song "Our eternal leader, Hafez al-Assad". Syrian officials were made to refer to him as 'the sanctified one' (al-Muqaddas). Assad was sometimes portrayed with apparently divine properties, and many places and objects were renamed in honor of the Assads. Fervently loyalist paramilitaries known as the Shabiha (tr. ghosts) deify the Assad dynasty through slogans such as "There is no God except Bashar!" (Arabic: لا إله الا بشار) and pursue psychological warfare against non-conformist populations.

Middle East Insight magazine wrote: "In no other country in recent memory ... not Mao's China, nor Tito's Yugoslavia, has the intensity of the personality cult reached such extremes. Asad's image, speaking, smiling, listening, benevolent or stern, solemn or reflective, is everywhere. Sometimes there are half a dozen pictures of him in a row. His face envelops telephone poles and trucks, churches and mosques. His is the visage a Syrian sees when he opens his newspaper."

After the fall of the Assad regime, a phenomenon called de-Assadization emerged – the mass destruction of any symbols of the Assadist era.

=== Human rights ===
The Assad regime's human rights record has been widely criticized by international organizations for its virtual absence. The regime's totalitarian measures were intensified after the end of the Islamist uprising in the 1980s and again during the civil war. The Assad regime has consistently been ranked among the worst in the world for human rights. The Assadists' long history of arbitrary arrests and detentions extends to neighboring Lebanon, which was occupied for nearly 30 years. Over the decades of Assadist rule, more than 70,000 people have been forcibly disappeared, 40,000 killed and hundreds of thousands deported in Syria, and 17,000 have gone missing in Lebanon during the occupation; the army has also targeted representatives of the Red Cross organization. And that's not counting the Syrian civil war, when hundreds of thousands were killed and millions fled.

== Opposition ==
Flag used by the anti-Assadist opposition which became an official symbol of Syria in 2025

There was also an opposition to the Assadist regime, especially in the later years of the Ba'athist Syria which included Islamists, Pro-Iraqi Ba'thists, human rights activists, ethnic and religious minorities like Kurds and Druze and other groups. The regime's crackdown on the Syrian dissidents caused the Syrian revolution, civil war, and the ultimate fall of the Assad regime, ending the 61 years of the Ba'athist regime not only in Syria but worldwide. The opposition to the Assadist regime was also called anti-Assadism.

== See also ==
- Syrian opposition (2011–2024)
- Saddamism
- Ba'athist Iraq

== Sources ==
- Federal Research Division (2004). Syria: A Country Study. Kessinger Publishing. ISBN 978-1-4191-5022-7.
- Seale, Patrick (1990). Asad: The Struggle for the Middle East. University of California Press. ISBN 978-0-520-06976-3.
- Winslow, Charles (2012). Lebanon: War and Politics in a Fragmented Society. Routledge. ISBN 978-1-134-76240-8.
