= Dandachi =

Dandachi is an Arabic surname. Notable people with the surname include:

- Abdelrazak al-Restom al-Dandachi (1899–1935), Syrian intellectual and activist
- Ali al-Dandachi (1906–2000), Syrian Scout vice president
