= Syrian Committee to Help Iraq =

Political movement created in 1941

- Arab Ba'ath: 1940–1947
- Arab Ba'ath Movement: 1940–1947
- Ba'ath Party: 1947–1966
- Baath Party (pro-Iraqi): 1968–2003
- Baath Party (pro-Syrian): 1966–2024

The Syrian Committee to Help Iraq was a political movement created in 1941 to support Iraq against the British during the Anglo–Iraqi War of 1941. It sent weapons and volunteers to fight alongside Iraqi forces against the British. It was organized and led by Arab Ihya Movement (later known as the Arab Ba'ath Movement) leader Michel Aflaq. Zaki al-Arsuzi opposed the organisation.
