= Zaki al-Arsuzi =

Syrian philosopher (1899–1968)

Zaki al-Arsuzi زكي الأرسوزي
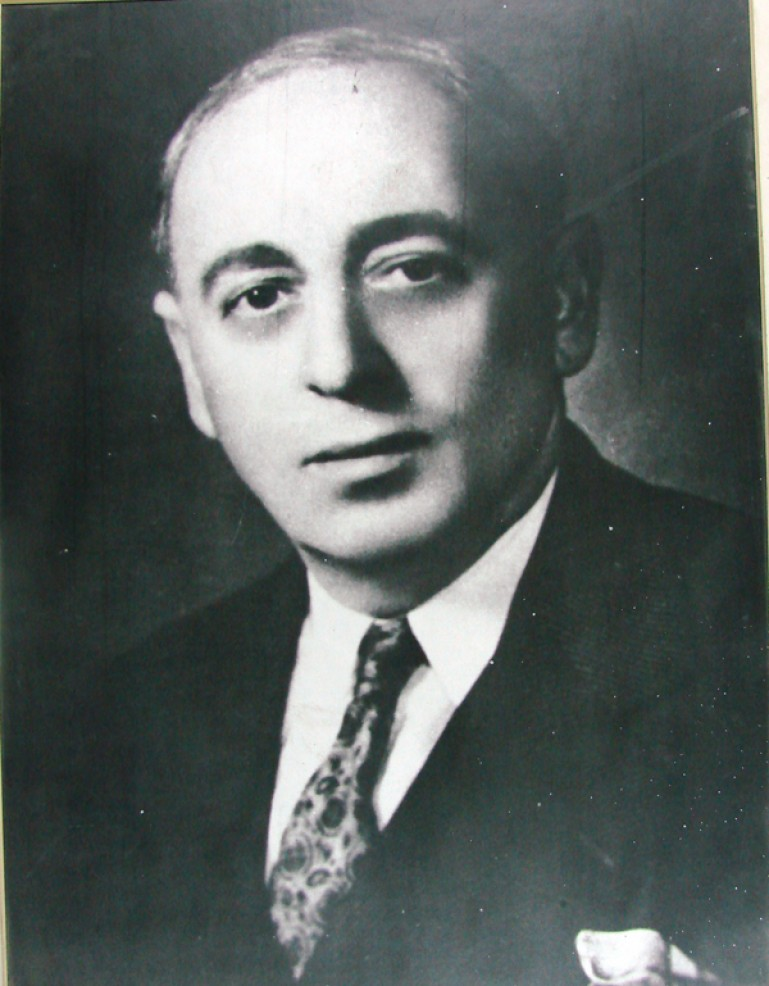
- al-Arsuzi before 1939
- Born: June 1899; Latakia, Beirut vilayet, Ottoman Empire
- Died: 2 July 1968 (aged 69); Damascus, Ba'athist Syria

Philosophical work
- Era: 20th-century philosophy
- Region: Middle Eastern philosophy
- School: Ba'athism, Arab nationalism
- Main interests: Politics, philosophy, sociology, nationalism, philology, history
- Notable ideas: Co-founder of Ba'athism (with Aflaq and al-Bitar), The Genius of Arabic in its Tongue
- Political party: League of Nationalist Action (1933–1939); Arab National Party (1939); Arab Ba'ath (1940–1947); Ba'ath Party (Syria) (1960s); Ba'ath Party (Syrian-dominated faction) (after 1966)

Zaki al-Arsuzi (Arabic: زكي الأرسوزي, romanized: Zakī al-Arsūzī; June 1899 – 2 July 1968) was a Syrian philosopher, philologist, sociologist, historian, and Arab nationalist. His ideas played a significant role in the development of Ba'athism and its political movement. He published several books during his lifetime, most notably The Genius of Arabic in its Tongue (1943).

Born into a middle-class Alawite family in Latakia, Syria, al-Arsuzi studied at the Sorbonne, where he became interested in nationalism. In 1930, he returned to Syria, where he became a member of the League of National Action (LNA) in 1933. In 1938, he moved to Damascus because of his disillusionment with party work, and in 1939, he left the LNA. In Damascus al-Arsuzi established and headed a group consisting of mostly secondary school pupils who would often discuss European history, nationalism and philosophy. Shortly after leaving the LNA, al-Arsuzi established the Arab National Party, an Arab nationalist party with a "defined creed". It was not a success and, on his return to Syria in November 1940 after a brief stay in Baghdad, al-Arsuzi established a new party, the Arab Ba'ath; by 1944, however, most of its members had left and joined Michel Aflaq's and Salah al-Din al-Bitar's Arab Ba'ath Movement, which subscribed to a nearly identical doctrine.

In 1947, the two movements merged, forming a single Arab Ba'ath Party. Despite the merger, Al-Arsuzi neither attended its founding conference nor was given membership.

During the rest of the 1940s and 1950s, al-Arsuzi stayed out of politics and worked as a teacher. He made a comeback during the 1960s power struggle in the Ba'ath Party between Aflaq and al-Bitar on one hand and Salah Jadid and Hafez al-Assad on the other. When Aflaq and al-Bitar lost the power struggle and were forced to escape from Syria in 1966, al-Arsuzi replaced Aflaq as the main ideologue of the Syrian-led faction of the Ba'ath Party (Neo-Ba'athist)

Al-Arsuzi's theories about society, language and nationalism, which are collectively part of Ba'athist thought, hold that the Arab Nation will be unified when the Arab people reestablish the Arab identity they have lost over the past 1000 years. The key to Arab unification, according to al-Arsuzi, is through language. In contrast to the Latin language, al-Arsuzi argued, Arabic was far less arbitrary and far more intuitive. Despite his contributions to Ba'athist thought, al-Arsuzi is barely mentioned in Western or Arab scholarship. This omission may be linked to the fact that Sati' al-Husri, a contemporary Arab nationalist, had many of the same ideas as al-Arsuzi but was better able to articulate them.

== Biography ==
=== Childhood and early life: 1899–1930 ===
Zaki Najib Ibrahim al-Arsuzi was born in 1900 or 1901 to a middle-class family of Alawi origins in Latakia on the Syrian coast of the Ottoman Sultanate. His mother, Maryam came from a prominent religious family, while his father, Najib Ibrahim was a lawyer. With his two brothers, one sister and his parents, he moved to Antakya in 1904. Arsuzi began his studies at a kuttab where he memorised the Quran. Four years later, his parents enrolled him into a rüşdiye to give him a proper Ottoman education. His father was arrested by Ottoman authorities in 1915 for nationalist activities; Arsuzi later believed that this event triggered his interest in nationalist politics. His father was imprisoned for a short period before he and his family were sent to internal exile in the Anatolian city of Konya. After a year in exile, Najib and his family were allowed to move back to Antioch. According to Arsuzi, his father replaced the Ottoman flag with the Hashemite flag on the Antioch government house upon hearing the news that Faisal I of Iraq had entered Damascus. This, however, was never independently verified.

In the aftermath of World War I, Arsuzi began studying at Institut Laïc in Lebanon. It was here that Arsuzi was introduced to philosophy. Also, during his stay, Arsuzi was able to perfect his French. During Arsuzi's period of studying at Institut Laïc, his atheism became notorious, and he was often caught saying "Sons of Earth are more capable of directing their affairs than sons of heaven." After finishing his studies, Arsuzi got a job as a mathematics teacher in a local secondary school in Antioch. However, he later received the job of heading the school district of Arsuz – a job he held from 1924 to 1926. In 1927 Arsuzi received a scholarship from the French High Commission to study at the Sorbonne University in France. He studied there from 1927 to 1930, but never obtained a degree from the Sorbonne. During his stay at the Sorbonne, Arsuzi befriended former French colonial administrator Jean Gaulmier. At the Sorbonne, Arsuzi developed an interest in 19th-century European philosophy; he became attracted to the thoughts of Georges Dumas, Emile Brehier, Leon Brunschvig (his philosophy professor), Henri Bergson and Johann Gottlieb Fichte among others. The books which influenced Arsuzi most at the time were Bergson's L'Evolution créatrice and Fichte's Reden an die deutsche Nation; of these, Fichte is the philosopher Arsuzi identified most with. Both Fichte and Bergson wrote of the importance of education and in the core, there was the nation.

=== The Alexandretta crisis and the founding of the Ba'ath: 1930–1939 ===
Al-Arsuzi returned to Syria in 1930 and later worked as a teacher in Antioch in 1932. "The awakening was brutal," according to historian Patrick Seale. The French authorities in Syria prohibited al-Arsuzi from teaching his students about European philosophy and the French Revolution among other topics. When he was caught teaching his students about the ideals of the French Revolution—liberty, equality, fraternity—he was forced out of the class. In 1934 al-Arsuzi founded a student club, the Club des Beaux Arts, with the ambition of spreading French culture; the club was frowned upon by the French authorities. Later that year al-Arsuzi began his political career in earnest and became a strident Arab nationalist.

In August 1933, al-Arsuzi and fifty other Arab nationalists established the League of National Action (LNA) in the Lebanese city of Quarna'il. Most of the Arab parties at that time were dominated by the former Ottoman elite or had high levels of Ottoman membership. The LNA was one of the few exceptions; the majority of LNA members were young and had been educated in the West. While LNA initially proved popular with the people, its popularity shrank when its founder Abd al-Razzaq al-Dandashi died in 1935. Al-Arsuzi was the LNA's regional head in Antioch, from the founding of the party in 1933 until 1939.

When Turkey first attempted to annex the province of Alexandretta in the early 1930s, al-Arsuzi became one of the most vocal critics of Turkey's policy towards Syria; he became a symbol of the Arab nationalist struggle. In 1939 France, which controlled Syria, ceded the province to Turkey in order to establish an alliance with that state. Al-Arsuzi left the LNA shortly thereafter.

Al-Arsuzi moved to Damascus in 1938 and began working on his ideas of Arabism and Arab nationalism. Disillusioned with party politics, he gathered several secondary school pupils to establish a learning group. At the group's meetings, al-Arsuzi would talk about, for instance, the French Revolution, the Meiji Restoration, German Unification and Italian Unification, or about the ideas of Fichte, Friedrich Nietzsche, Karl Marx, Georg Wilhelm Friedrich Hegel, Oswald Spengler and Henri Bergson. Shortly after leaving the LNA, al-Arsuzi established the Arab National Party, an Arab nationalist party with a "defined creed". The party did not last long; al-Arsuzi left for Baghdad at the end of the year. During his stay in Baghdad, al-Arsuzi tried, idealistically, to enlighten Iraqis with his thoughts on Arab nationalism, but returned to Syria disappointed in 1940. On 29 November 1940 al-Arsuzi founded the Arab Ba'ath.

=== The Arab Ba'ath: 1940–1947 ===
Around the same time that al-Arsuzi founded the Arab Ba'ath another group, led by Michel Aflaq and Salah al-Din al-Bitar, established the Arab Ihya Movement. Patrick Seale states that al-Arsuzi issued pamphlets under the name Al-Ba'ath, Al-'Arabi, while the Arab Ilhya Movement published pamphlets under the name al-Ihya, al-'Arabi. While Aflaq and al-Bitar left work to focus on the party organisation, al-Arsuzi worked as a teacher until 1959. There were not many members in the party, and most of them used their time reading, writing and translating works. In June 1941 al-Arsuzi was exiled from Damascus, three members were arrested and the remaining members fled. The following year, in 1942, al-Arsuzi and his associates tried to revitalise the party, but the attempt failed. One of his associates claims that al-Arsuzi had become bitter and even paranoid during his one-year exile, exclaiming that the group "loved the people and hated the individual; [his group] held the whole sacred, but they despised the parts". By 1944 the majority of Arab Ba'ath members had left the organisation for the more active Arab Ihya Movement (renamed to Arab Ba'ath Movement in 1943). Relations between Aflaq and al-Arsuzi were bitter at best; al-Arsuzi accused Aflaq of stealing his party's name.

At the same time, al-Arsuzi's interest in politics was waning, and he spent an increasing amount of his time engaging in philology. In 1943 this work culminated in the publication of a book, The Genius of Arabic in its Tongue, an analysis of the roots and distinctive features of the Arabic language (see the Culture and Language section). Despite this, al-Arsuzi appeared increasingly unbalanced mentally. Several people noted that he became less social, and was more inclined to shun social contacts and friends. He would later suffer from delusions. He was forced to move on again in 1949, this time living in Lattakia and later moving to live with his mother in Tarsus. It was there that his mother would die, poverty-stricken. According to one of his associates, al-Arsuzi himself spent a great deal of time living in "extreme poverty", reduced "to a life of penury and persecution" by the French authorities.

Al-Arsuzi's popularity within his own ranks lessened after Rashid Ali al-Gaylani's coup in Iraq. While Aflaq and al-Bitar founded the Syrian Committee to Help Iraq to support Iraq during the Anglo–Iraqi War, al-Arsuzi opposed any involvement on the grounds that al-Gaylani's policies would fail. While several Arab Ba'ath members agreed with al-Arsuzi's conclusion, the majority were attracted to Aflaq's romanticism. Another reason for the Arab Ba'ath's failure was al-Arsuzi's deep mistrust of others; when a party member had written a manifesto entitled Arab Ba'ath, al-Arsuzi "saw in it an imperialist plot to block his way to the people".

The Arab Ba'ath Movement, led by Aflaq and al-Bitar, was merged into the Arab Ba'ath Party in 1947. During negotiations, Wahib al-Ghanim and Jalal al-Sayyid, not al-Arsuzi, represented the Arab Ba'ath, while Aflaq and al-Bitar represented the Arab Ba'ath Movement. The only policy issue which was discussed in great detail was how socialist the party was going to be. The groups came to an agreement; the Ba'ath movement became radicalised, and moved further to the left. Al-Arsuzi did not attend the founding congress, nor was he given membership in the new party.

=== Later life and death: 1948–1968 ===
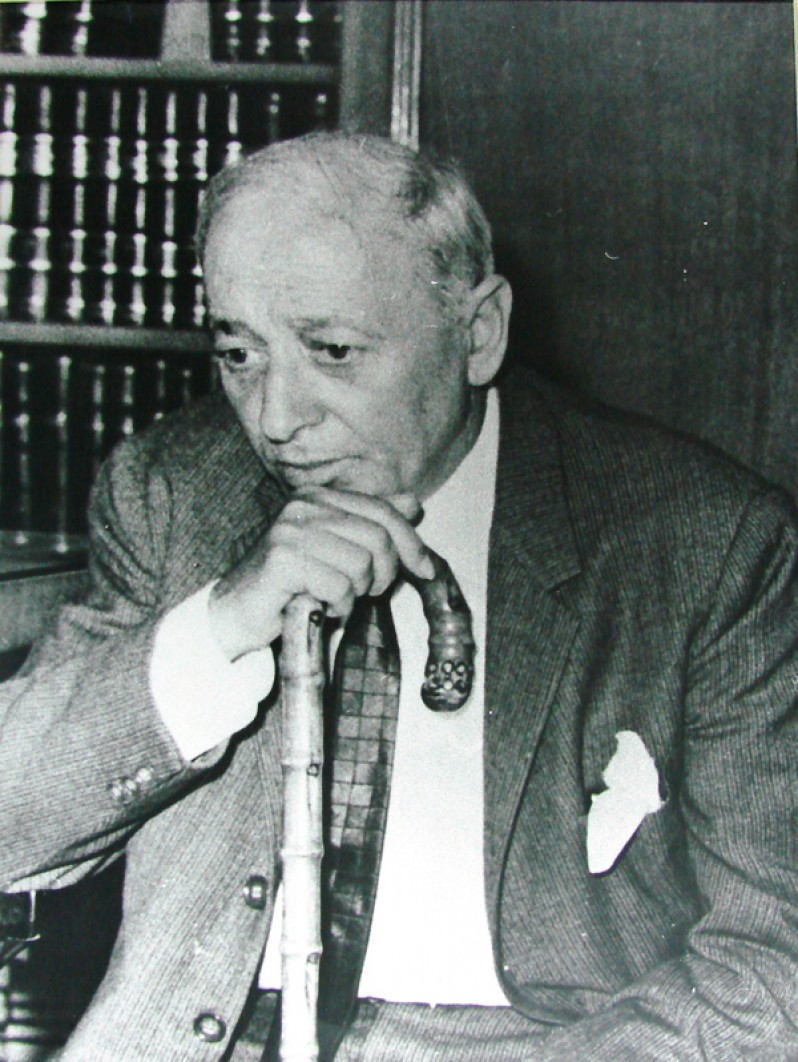
al-Arsuzi as seen in the early 1960s

After his return from Baghdad in 1940, al-Arsuzi had gained a position teaching philosophy, but he was soon dismissed from it. From 1945 until 1952 he worked again as a secondary teacher, first in Hama and then in Aleppo, and from 1952 until his retirement in 1959, he taught in a teacher training college.

In 1963, in the wake of the Sixth National Congress of the Ba'ath Party and the party's gradual alienation from its founders Aflaq and Bitar, Hafez al-Assad arranged for Arsuzi to help with Ba'athist ideological formation in the army, and later ensured that he was granted a state pension. Al-Arsuzi was elected to a seat in the National Command of the Ba'ath Party in 1965. Salah Jadid, the Ba'ath Party strongman at the time, opposed Aflaq's and al-Bitar's leadership of the party and, because of it, wanted al-Arsuzi to replace them as the original founder of Ba'athist thought. Following the Ba'ath Party split of 1966 (the party split into two branches, one Iraqi-led Ba'ath Party and one Syrian-led Ba'ath Party) al-Arsuzi became the Syrian-led Ba'ath Party's main ideologue, while Aflaq was the de jure ideologue of the Iraqi-led Ba'ath Party. From 1966 to 1968 al-Arsuzi acted as al-Assad's and Jadid's personal ideological mentor. Al-Arsuzi died in Damascus on 2 July 1968.

== Al-Arsuzi's thought ==
=== Arab Nation ===
Al-Arsuzi's central thought was the unification of the Arab Nation. He believed that the Arab Nation could trace its roots to the pre-Islamic and early Islamic periods of Arab history. The historical link to an Arab Nation was more important to al-Arsuzi than it was to other Arab nationalists and Ba'athists. The only way to create a new Arab Nation in the Modern Age was to reestablish a link between the Arab people of the past and those of the present through language—the only true remnant of the old Arab identity. In short, language was the key to regain what had been lost (the Arab Nation) and reinvigorate the Arab identity. Al-Arsuzi believed that the Arabs lost their common identity when they allowed non–Arabs to participate in government. The result was that several laws had non-Arab characteristics—these laws, and other changes brought by non-Arabs, weakened Arab identity.

=== Culture and language ===
Al-Arsuzi paid considerable attention to cultural matters, and Batatu records that the only condition of membership in his organisation was "to write or translate a book contributing to the resurrection [ba'ath] of Arab heritage." He has been described as a proponent of the "linguistic image of Arab nationalism", and in 1942 published one of his most important works, Abqariyyat al-'arabiyya fi lisaniha (The Genius of Arabic in its Tongue). His approach was distinguished by its emphasis on philology, but he did also pay attention to problems of the modern state and to questions of democracy and the locus of power. Batatu has also described al-Arsuzi as having a racist outlook, which proved in the end intellectually sterile and unsatisfactory to his followers, and as having been deeply influenced in his thought by the tenets of his Alawi religious background.

Al-Arsuzi argued that unlike the Latin language, which is conventional and uses arbitrary signs to explain certain objects, the Arabic language formed words derived from the vocalism of its syllables and "in its expression of a direct representation of a natural object" – unlike Latin, Arabic is essentially in conformity with nature. Arabic is, according to al-Arsuzi, an intuitive language; there is "a natural sympathy" between the pronunciation of Arabic words and their meaning: an Arabic word is united with its meaning by definition of a referent, which is absorbed in such an operation. For al-Arsuzi, the identity of the Arab Nation is embodied in the Arab language; it is the language that forms the source of the nationalist spirit. According to al-Arsuzi's theory, European nationalism is based on the principle of causality, while Arab nationalism is based on the principle of spontaneity. Al-Arsuzi's definition of language is in contrast to that of Socrates and other thinkers.

=== Nationalism ===
Al-Arsuzi attributed the rise of European nationalism to revolutions in intellectual, social and economic domains. The first revolution came to being under the feudal system, which gave birth to human casual and relative relationships. The second revolution, the Scientific Revolution, led by Nicolaus Copernicus and Galileo Galilei, ended the conception of nature developed during the Medieval Ages. These events created the foundations of modern rationality. On this subject, al-Arsuzi said, "man was qualified to know the truth, since what is constructed by reason can be verified by experiment". Al-Arsuzi summed up this particular view of human behaviour and civilization with René Descartes's words: "Common sense or reason is naturally equal to man". In al-Arsuzi's view, if humans were rational creatures, each would wish to organise themselves according to his or her own sense of reason, and hence would want to take over the affairs of state from oppressors (colonists). The colonists acted as a barrier to such "rational" change.

Modern life existed because of two things—science and industry. Science eliminated superstition, and replaced it with facts; and Industry enabled civilization to create a more strong, organised society where liberty, equality and democracy could become permanent. The experiences of the English and French Revolutions proved this; the revolutions gave the individual certain rights, so that the individual "could conduct his own affairs according to his will". The demand for liberty would eventually evolve into the demand for independence, literally nationalism. Nationalism had, according to al-Arsuzi, manifested itself in all walks of life, from the rule of law to the arts; everything in a nation was the manifestation of that particular nation's identity. Al-Arsuzi's thesis marked a dividing line between the Medieval Ages and the Modern Age.

== Legacy ==
Al-Arsuzi's work and thought are almost unknown and barely mentioned in Western scholarship on Arab nationalism. When he is actually mentioned in a text, it is predominantly on his irredentist views of the unified Arab Nation. Although his collected works have been published since the mid-1970s, al-Arsuzi's work on the Arabic language, which is central to al-Arsuzi's nationalist thought, is rarely mentioned at all. The study of al-Arsuzi's ideas in Arabic scholarship is also lacking. Academic Yasir Suleiman gives the principal reason for this as the similarity of al-Arsuzi's works to those of Sati' al-Husri, a contemporary. Suleiman goes on to explain Al-Arsuzi's eclipsed legacy as the combination of a number of factors: firstly, in contrast to al-Husri's idea of language, al-Arsuzi's theory is self-defeating because it excluded other theories instead of including them. Secondly, his work was written with an elitist slant, rather than the populist one which al-Husri managed to convey. Thirdly, and in contrast to al-Husri's work, al-Arsuzi's work seemed old-fashioned, due to his use of old words and historical texts; moreover, while al-Arsuzi wrote about the symbolic need of an Arab Nation, al-Hustri wrote about the practical role of an Arab Nation—al-Arsuzi was obscure where al-Husri was transparent. Whereas Al-Husri was able to prove his arguments with empirical data, al-Arsuzi was unable. Thus, Suleiman writes, al-Husri appeared more informed than al-Arsuzi, when really he was not. The lack of empirical data in al-Arsuzi's work made it look parochial at times, while at other times his conclusions bordered on machoistic nationalism, which in turn could be interpreted as racism. Another reason for his "negligible" impact, according to Suleiman, was al-Arsuzi's idea of the need to replace the traditional Arabic grammar system with a new one. The Center for Research and Documentation on World Language Problems agrees with Suleiman's conclusion, but further claims that al-Arsuzi's work was "often far-fetched and 'airy-fairy'".

Several Ba'athists, mostly from the Syrian-led Ba'ath Party, have denounced Aflaq as a "thief"; these critics claim that Aflaq had stolen the Ba'athist ideology from al-Arsuzi and proclaimed it as his own. Whatever the case may be, al-Arsuzi was hailed by Hafez al-Assad, the Ba'athist leader of Syria, as the principal founder of Ba'athist thought, following the 1966 Ba'ath Party split. The Iraqi branch, however, still proclaims Aflaq as the founder of Ba'athism. Al-Assad has referred to al-Arsuzi as the "greatest Syrian of his day" and claimed him to be the "first to conceive of the Ba'ath as a political movement." The Syrian Ba'athists have erected a statue in al-Arsuzi's honour; it was erected following the 1966 coup. Even so, the majority of Ba'athists still agree that Aflaq, not al-Arsuzi, was the principal founder of the Ba'ath movement. Despite this, Keith David Watenpaugh believes Ba'athism was conceived by the "trio" consisting of al-Arsuzi, Aflaq and Salah al-Din al-Bitar, and not one principal founder.

== Selected works ==
- The Genius of Arabic in Its Tongue (published 1943)
- Al-Umma al-Arabiyya (English: The Arab World, published 1958)
- Mashakiluna al-Qawmiyya (English: Our Nationalist Problems, published 1958)
