= Arab Ba'ath Movement =

Arab Ba'ath Movement حركة البعث العربي
- Leader: Michel Aflaq and Salah al-Din al-Bitar
- Founded: 1940
- Dissolved: 1947
- Preceded by: Party of National Brotherhood
- Succeeded by: Ba'ath Party
- Newspaper: Al-Tali'a
- Ideology: Ba'athism
- Colors: Black, Red, White and Green (Pan-Arab colors)

The Arab Baʽath Movement (Arabic: حركة البعث العربي Ḥarakat al-Baʽth al-‘Arabī; lit. Arab Resurrection Movement or Arab Renaissance Movement) was a Ba'athist political party and predecessor of the Arab Socialist Baʽath Party. The party was first named the Arab Ihya Movement (Ḥarakat al-Iḥyāʼ al-‘Arabī; Arab Revitalization Movement) until 1943 when it adopted the name "Baʽath" (meaning resurrection). It was founded in 1940 by Michel Aflaq. Its founders, Aflaq and Bitar, were both associated with nationalism and socialism.

== History ==
The Movement was formed in 1940 as the Arab Ihya Movement by Syrian expatriate Michel Aflaq.

Shortly after being founded, the Movement became involved in anti-colonial Arab nationalist militant activities, including Aflaq founding the Syrian Committee to Help Iraq that was created in 1941 to support the anti-British and pro-Axis government of Iraq against the British during the Anglo-Iraqi War of 1941. The Syrian Committee sent weapons and volunteers to fight alongside Iraqi forces against the British.

Aflaq unsuccessfully ran as a candidate for the Syrian parliament in 1943. After the Syrian election defeat, the Movement sought cooperation with other parties in elections in Syria, including the Arab Socialist Movement of Akram El-Hourani.

The Party merged with Al-Arsuzi's Arab Baʽath Party in 1947, and al-Hawrani's Arab Socialist Movement later merged into the party in the 1950s to establish the Arab Socialist Baʽath Party.
