= Assadist–Saddamist conflict =

Iraqi-Syrian political conflict

- Part of the Arab Cold War (until 1990), Iran–Saudi Arabia proxy conflict (until 1990), Iraq–Syria relations, and Shia–Sunni conflict (until 1990)
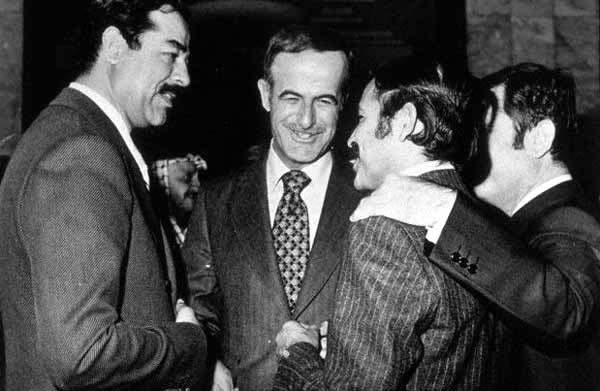
- Syrian president Hafez al-Assad (centre) with Iraqi vice president Saddam Hussein (left), Algerian foreign minister Abdelaziz Bouteflika (right), and Syrian vice president Abdul Halim Khaddam (far right, half-covered) at the 1978 Arab League summit in Baghdad.
Date	22 July 1979 – 8 December 2024 (45 years, 4 months and 16 days)
Location	Arab world (mainly in Iraq and Syria)
Result	Inconclusive; Saddamists ousted from power in Iraq in 2003; Assadists ousted from power in Syria in 2024

Belligerents
Assadists: Ba'ath Party (Syrian-dominated faction); Ba'ath Party – Syria Region; Assadists in Iraq; Al-Awda (alleged); Assadists in other Arab states; Ba'athist Syria (until 2024); (Ba'athist Syria) Syrian Popular Resistance (from 2024)	Saddamists: Ba'ath Party (Iraqi-dominated faction); Ba'ath Party – Iraq Region; Saddamists in Syria; Saddamists in other Arab states; Ba'athist Iraq (until 2003); (Ba'athist Iraq) JRTN (from 2006)

Commanders and leaders
(Ba'athist Syria) Hafez al-Assad #; (Ba'athist Syria) Bashar al-Assad (surrendered); (Ba'athist Syria) Maher al-Assad (surrendered); (Ba'athist Syria) Hassan Turkmani X; (Ba'athist Syria) Assef Shawkat X; (Iraq) Fawzi Mutlaq al-Rawi #	(Ba'athist Iraq) Saddam Hussein (executed); (Ba'athist Iraq) Izzat Ibrahim al-Douri #; (Ba'athist Iraq) Tariq Aziz (POW); (Ba'athist Iraq) Ali Hassan al-Majid (executed); (Ba'athist Iraq) Salah Al-Mukhtar; (Ba'athist Iraq) Raghad Hussein
- The conflict between the Ba'ath Party (Iraqi-dominated faction), Ba'ath Party – Iraq Region and the Ba'ath Party (Syrian-dominated faction), Ba'ath Party – Syria Region already began in 1966 following the 1966 Syrian coup d'état before even al-Assad became President of Syria and before Hussein became President of Iraq

The Assadist–Saddamist conflict, also known as the Ba'ath Party intraconflict, was a conflict and ideological rivalry between the Assadist Syrian-led Ba'ath Party and its subgroups, loyal to Ba'athist Syria, and the Saddamist Iraqi-led Ba'ath Party and its subgroups, loyal to Ba'athist Iraq. The conflict continued ideologically even after the U.S.-led invasion of Iraq and subsequent toppling of President Saddam Hussein, and ended after the fall of the Assad regime to a Syrian opposition offensive. Nonetheless, both regimes demonstrate shared traits, including strong militarization of society, autocratic rule, oppression, limitations on freedoms, power monopolization, electoral fraud, and responsibility for extensive suffering in both nations and the wider region.

== History ==
=== Early Ba'athist divide ===
The conflict first emerged after the Ba'ath Party was split into two factions following the 1966 Syrian coup d'état where Michel Aflaq and Salah al-Din al-Bitar were overthrown by Hafez al-Assad and Salah Jadid. In the 1970s, the two Ba'athist parties managed to reconcile with several attempts being made to establish a union between the two states. There was also close communications between the two governments to foil the Camp David Accords between Egypt and Israel. The conflict ultimately erupted again as a result of the 1979 Ba'ath Party Purge against suspected fifth columnists backed by the Syrian regime to overthrow Saddam's government in Iraq.

=== Other Ba'athist interventions in other conflicts ===
==== Black September ====
During Black September, Syria conducted a short-lived incursion toward Irbid in northern Jordan, before being forced to withdraw due to heavy casualties. Syria's supposed aim was to help the Palestinian fedayeen overthrow the Hashemite monarchy. The Syrian invasion expressed the ruling Syrian Arab Socialist Ba'ath Party's stance against "the reactionary regime" in Jordan and its desire to overthrow it. The Syrian Ba'ath Party adopted strongman Salah Jadid's policy of pushing for military intervention against Jordan on 17 September 1970. Syria committed 16,000 troops and more than 170 T-55 tanks and other armoured vehicles to invade Jordan, but declined to commit its air force. This has been attributed to power struggles within the Syrian Ba'athist government between Syrian Assistant Regional Secretary Salah Jadid, who had ordered the tank incursion, and Syrian Air Force commander Hafez al-Assad.

A 17,000-man 3rd Armoured Division of the Iraqi Army had remained in eastern Jordan since after the 1967 Six-Day War. The Iraqi government sympathized with the Palestinians, but it was unclear whether the division would get involved in the conflict in favor of the fedayeen. However in the end Ba'athist Iraq choose not to get involved. Iraqi impartiality was attributed to Iraqi general Hardan Al-Tikriti's commitment to Hussein not to interfere—he was assassinated a year later for this. It is also thought that the rivalry between the Iraqi and Syrian Ba'ath Party was the real reason for Iraqi non-involvement.

==== Yom Kippur War ====
During the Yom Kippur War, Egypt and Syria launched a joint attack at Israel. While initially successful, Israel turned the tide back in its favor, particularly on the Syrian front. Iraq sent an expeditionary force to Syria, consisting of the 3rd and 6th Armoured Divisions; some 30,000 men, 250–500 tanks, and 700 APCs - the largest such expeditionary force of the war. Jordan also sent an expeditionary force. Combined Syrian, Iraqi and Jordanian counterattacks prevented any further Israeli gains. However, they were unable to push the Israelis back.

Later, Iraq's propaganda would claim that its intervention prevented the fall of Damascus into Israeli hands. This is unlikely to be the case, as the famously casualty-averse IDF had no plans of entering the city. Nor is there any evidence that Iraqi forces performed significantly better than Syrian forces.

=== Assadist–Saddamist conflict ===
==== Iran-Iraq War ====
In 1980, when Saddam Hussein invaded Iran, leading to the Iran–Iraq war, the Syrian Ba'ath chose to ally with Iran. This began a Syrian Ba'athist alliance with Shia Islamists, and an Iraqi Ba'athist alliance with the West and Sunni Islamists. Despite the Ba'ath Party as a whole claiming to be secular, the conflict is partially rooted in sectarianism as the Iraqi Ba'ath party was led by Sunnis, while the Syrian Ba'ath party was led by Alawites. The Iraqi Ba'ath Party supported the Muslim Brotherhood in their revolt against the Syrian Ba'ath. The Syrian Ba'ath Party, in turn, supported the PUK and KDP. Syria also supported the PKK, which Iraq later began supporting as well, and the group capitalized off of both states.

During U.S. Middle East envoy Donald Rumsfeld's visit to Iraq in 1983, Saddam Hussein gave him a videotape. The video was allegedly filmed in Syria, and showed Hafez al-Assad overseeing Syrian troops strangling and stabbing puppies to death, and a line of young women biting off the heads of snakes. The video appeared to have been edited, with various clips of Assad applauding spliced in to suggest he was present. Rumsfeld would later write that he was sceptical of the video's authenticity, speculating that Saddam was using the video as a means to paint the Assad regime as barbaric and convince the U.S. to take Iraq's side in a potential conflict. The video was later released by Rumsfeld via his "The Rumsfeld Papers" website in 2011.

==== Lebanon Civil War ====
Both Syria and Iraq were involved in the Lebanon Civil War, along with other countries although Syria had a greater role in the war. Both countries supported different factions during the war. Hafez al-Assad's primary objectives were to prevent a potential PLO-dominated Lebanon from pulling Syria into a potential war with Israel it was unprepared for, and to prevent the partition of the country among sectarian lines so as not to inspire similar ambitions within Syria itself. The invasion received widespread rebuke in the Arab world. Saddam Hussein searched for proxy battlefields for the Iran–Iraq War. To counter Iran's influence through Amal and Hezbollah, Iraq backed Maronite groups. Saddam Hussein helped Aoun and the Lebanese Forces led by Samir Geagea between 1988 and 1990. Within the PLO, the rival Ba'athist countries of Syria and Iraq both set up Palestinian puppet organizations. The as-Sa'iqa was a Syrian-controlled militia, paralleled by the Arab Liberation Front (ALF) under Iraqi command. The Syrian government could also count on the Syrian brigades of the Palestine Liberation Army (PLA), formally but not functionally the PLO's regular army.

On 3 June 1982 Israel's ambassador to the United Kingdom, Shlomo Argov was shot and seriously wounded in London by militants belonging to the Iraqi-backed Abu Nidal militant organization. The attack was ordered by the Iraqi Intelligence Service. Following the attack, the assassins drove to the Iraqi embassy in London, where they deposited the weapon.

Israeli prime Minister Menachem Begin used this as the "internationally recognized provocation" necessary to invade Lebanon. The fact that the Abu Nidal organization was the longtime rival of PLO, that its head was condemned to death by the PLO court, and that the British police reported that PLO leaders were on the "hit list" of the attackers did not deter Begin. Iraq's motives for the assassination attempt may have been to punish Israel for its destruction of Iraq's nuclear reactor in June 1981, and to provoke a war in Lebanon that Iraqi leaders calculated would be detrimental to the rival Ba'ath regime in Syria—whether Syria intervened to help the PLO or not. Indeed, Iraq supported the anti-Syrian Bachir Gemayel's bid for the presidency. Thus in 1982, Syria battled Israel over control of Lebanon in the 1982 Lebanon War

==== Gulf War ====
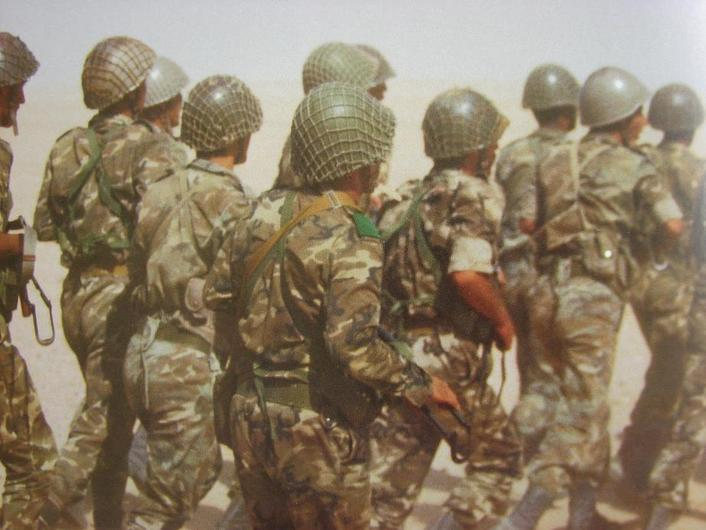
Syrian soldiers during the Gulf War in 1991

In 1990, Iraq invaded Kuwait. After United Nations Security Council authorization, Syria joined the coalition that liberated Kuwait from Iraqi occupation in the 1991 Gulf War. Syria broke relations after the invasion and joined other Arab states in sending military forces to the coalition that forced Iraq out of Kuwait. However, by 1997, Syrian president Hafez al-Assad began reestablishing relations with Iraqi president Saddam Hussein. Hafez died in 2000 and Iraq sent Vice President Taha Muhie-eldin Marouf to attend the state funeral. The ascendance of Bashar al-Assad in 2000 boosted this process. Under Bashar, Syria ignored the sanctions against Iraq and assisted Iraq to illegally import oil.

=== Collapse of both regimes ===
In 2003, the United States invaded Iraq and removed the Saddamists from power, leaving the Syrian Arab Republic as the only remaining Ba'athist state, until a 2024 offensive by the Syrian opposition which ousted the Assadists from power. In the subsequent conflict in Iraq, Syria provided refuge to former Iraqi Ba'athists as part of its support for the Iraqi insurgency, despite the historical animosity.

In 2024, after the Bashar al-Assad regime collapsed, Ali Khamenei stated that Iran's support for Ba'athist Syria in 2013 was a response to Hafez al-Assad's support for Iran during the Iran–Iraq War by blocking transit of 1 million barrels of oil through the Mediterranean Sea.

The remnants of the Iraqi Ba'ath Party welcomed the collapse of the Syrian Ba'ath Party, declaring on its official website on 7 April 2025. "The fall of the apostate regime in Syria not only brought it down as a regime falsely claiming to represent the Ba'ath Party, but also thwarted the Iranian project, which considered its control of the Syrian arena a cornerstone for its expansion and encroachment into the Arab world. With this fall, the Zionist project lost one of its allies, whose role complemented the Zionist enemy's efforts to weaken the foundations of the nation-state and transform it into a failed state by creating fertile ground for societal fragmentation based on sectarian and religious loyalties."

== See also ==
- Arab Cold War
- Iran–Saudi Arabia proxy conflict
- Iraq–Syria relations
- Shia–Sunni conflict
- Sino-Soviet split

== Bibliography ==
- Harris, William W. (2012). Lebanon: A History, 600-2011. Oxford University Press. ISBN 9780190217839.
- Kienle, Eberhard (1991). Ba'th v Ba'th: The Conflict Between Syria and Iraq, 1968-1989. I.B.Tauris.
- Mansour, Imad; Thompson, William R. (2020). Shocks and Rivalries in the Middle East and North Africa. Georgetown University Press. ISBN 9781626167681.
- Mufti, Malik (1996). Sovereign Creations: Pan-Arabism and Political Order in Syria and Iraq. Cornell University Press. Part III: The Post-Unionist State in Iraq and Syria.
- Rasheed, Amjed (2023). Power and Paranoia in Syria-Iraq Relations: The Impact of Hafez Assad and Saddam Hussain. Taylor & Francis. ISBN 9781000844740.
- Rasheed, Amjed Majeed (2017). Syro-Iraqi Relations: The Puzzle of the Perpetual Rivalry (Thesis). Durham University.
