= Arab National Party (historical) =

Arab National Party الحزب القومي العربي
- Leader: Zaki al-Arsuzi
- Founded: 1939
- Dissolved: 1939
- Preceded by: League of Nationalist Action
- Succeeded by: Arab Ba'ath
- Ideology: Arab nationalism Pan-Arabism; Pro-Nazism; Pro-Fascism
- Political position: Far-right

The Arab National Party (Arabic: الحزب القومي العربي Al-Hizb Al-Qawmi Al-'Arabi; French: Parti National Arabe) was an Arab nationalist party in Syria in 1939, founded by Zaki al-Arsuzi. Al-Arsuzi had been associated with Arab nationalist politics during the interwar period. He had been associated with the League of Nationalist Action, a political party strongly influenced by fascism and Nazism with its paramilitary "Ironshirts", that existed in Syria from 1932 to 1940. Al-Arsuzi left the National Action League in 1939 after its popular leader died and the party had fallen into disarray, he founded the Arab National Party in 1939 and dissolved it later that year.
