= Abd al-Razzaq al-Dandashi =

Syrian politician (1899–1935)

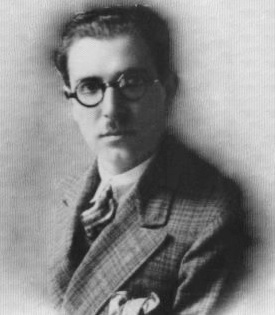
- Portrait of al-Dandashi

Secretary-General of League of Nationalist Action
- In office 1932–1935

Personal details
- Born: 1899 Talkalakh, Vilayet of Syria, Ottoman Empire
- Died: 1935 (aged 35–36)
- Party: League of Nationalist Action

Abd al-Razzaq al-Dandashi (Arabic: عبدالرزاق الرستم الدندشي; 1899–1935) was a Syrian intellectual and Arab nationalist activist. He was one of the founders of the League of Nationalist Action.

== Biography ==
Al-Dandashi was born to the wealthy Dandashi clan, a major political family based in Talkalakh. Al-Dandashi graduated from a university in Belgium with a degree in law. During his time at the university, he participated in Arab activist circles. After returning to Syria, he established a law office.

In 1932, Dandashi and other Arab intellectuals convened in the Mount Lebanon village of Qarnayel and founded the League of Nationalist Action (LNA), a nationalist political group whose main goal was coordinated Arab action in ending European colonialism in the Arab world. Dandashi became the secretary-general of the LNA. With his leadership position, he built a large power base, consisting of intellectuals, lawyers, and student activists. Under al-Dandashi, the LNA emerged as a more confrontational counterweight to the National Bloc which ultimately favored negotiating Syria's independence from French rule through diplomatic and other non-violent means. According to Syrian historian Sami Moubayed, al-Dandashi was "an impassioned orator and a hard-line Arab nationalist".

Al-Dandashi died in 1935 when he looked out from the window while riding a train and his head subsequently struck a tunnel wall. Al-Dandashi's death, the subsequent defection of Zaki al-Arsuzi to the Ba'ath Party and the expulsion of Sabri al-Asali greatly reduced the influence of the LNA in Syrian politics.

== Bibliography ==
- Moubayed, Sami (2006). Steel and Silk. Cune Press. ISBN 1885942419.
- Porath, Yehoshua (2014). In Search of Arab Unity 1930-1945. Routledge. ISBN 9781135198381.
