= Arab Ba'ath =

Arab Baʽath البعث العربي
- Founder: Zaki al-Arsuzi
- Founded: 29 November 1940
- Dissolved: 7 April 1947
- Preceded by: Arab National Party
- Merged into: Ba'ath Party
- Ideology: Arab nationalism

The Arab Baʽath (Arabic: البعث العربي), also known as the Arab Baʽath Party, was an Arab nationalist political party founded in Syria by Zaki al-Arsuzi in 1940.

Arsuzi was previously a member of the League of Nationalist Action but left in 1939 after its popular leader died and the party had fallen into disarray, he founded the short-lived Arab National Party in 1939 and dissolved it later that year. He formed the Arab Baʽath in 1940 and his views influenced Michel Aflaq who, alongside junior partner Salah al-Din al-Bitar, founded the Arab Ihya Movement in 1940 that later renamed itself the Arab Baʽath Movement in 1943. Though Aflaq was influenced by him, Arsuzi initially did not cooperate with Aflaq's movement. Arsuzi suspected that the existence of the Arab Ihya Movement, which occasionally titled itself "Arab Baʽath" during 1941, was part of an imperialist plot to prevent his influence over the Arabs by creating a movement of the same name.

A significant conflict between Arsuzi's and Aflaq's movements occurred when they sparred over the issue of the 1941 coup d'état by Rashid Ali al-Gaylani and the subsequent Anglo–Iraqi War. Aflaq's movement supported al-Gaylani's government and the Iraqi government's war against the British, and organized volunteers to go to Iraq and fight for the Iraqi government. However, Arsuzi opposed al-Gaylani's government, considering the coup to be poorly planned and a failure. At this point, Arsuzi's party lost members and support that transferred to Aflaq's movement.

Subsequently, Arsuzi's direct influence in Arab politics collapsed after Vichy French authorities expelled him from Syria in 1941. Aflaq's next major political action was its support of Lebanon's war of independence from France in 1943. The two movements eventually merged in 1947 without the involvement of Arsuzi.

== See also ==
- Arab Socialist Movement
- League of Nationalist Action
