= League of Nationalist Action =

League of Nationalist Action عصبة العمل القومي
- Founder: Abd al-Razzaq al-Dandashi
- Founded: 1932
- Dissolved: 1939
- Succeeded by: Arab National Party
- Headquarters: Damascus, Syria
- Paramilitary wing: Ironshirts
- Ideology: Syrian nationalism Arab nationalism

The League of Nationalist Action (Arabic: عصبة العمل القومي ‘Usbat al-'Amal al-Qawmi; French: Ligue d'action nationaliste), was a Syrian Arab nationalist anti-colonial political party, created in 1932–1933 by a lawyer of Homs, Abd al-Razzaq al-Dandashi.

== History ==
Its founders were opposed to the National Bloc party, the dominant party in Syria at the time. The nationalist and conservative party was considered too compromised with the French Mandate authorities. The Nationalist Action League is also opposed to sectarianism (ta'ifi'yah), tribalism (asha'iriyyah), differences in families ('a'iliyah) and "latitude". By its social composition, the League is the expression of "a middle class of merchants, teachers and civil servants".

During the relevant time period between 1930 and 1958 the countries of Syria and Lebanon were undergoing some political changes. The League was one of several radical nationalist organizations that coalesced in these years. Their criticism focused mainly on the colonial system, including but not limited to the French rule in Syria and Lebanon.

In terms of ideological affiliation, the Nationalist Action League is the heir of the Arab anti-Ottoman secret societies (Fatat al-, al-Qahtaniya, al-Ahd) and the pan-Arab nationalist party Istiqlal, active throughout the Fertile Crescent. According to Albert Hourani, the League never became an important organization because one of its principles was the non-cooperation with the existing regimes and leaders.

In 1938, his former secretary general "offer its cooperation to the French authorities." The opposite trend to the Secretary General then causes the bursting of the Ligue. The following year, after the death of its first president, Abderrazak al-Dandashli, the League broke up, but one of its most active militants, Zaki al-Arsuzi, set up the Club of Arabism (Nadi al 'Uruba) and became one of the founders of the Ba'ath Party.

For Claude Palazzoli, the Nationalist Action League "shows, at the national bourgeoisie, the beginning of a phenomenon of cracking and the first effort of the middle classes to distance themselves in respect of an upper middle class which they come off quite thereafter ".

== Alexandretta ==
The League had become a mass party, which was to mobilize the Syrians beyond the traditional elites. However, the party does not go beyond the small group, except in the city of Alexandretta, where party activists roamed the literary and sports clubs, schools and cafes. It was the site of spread of Arab nationalism and militant recruitment.
