= Bassam =

Bassam is an Arabic name and a given name roughly meaning "one who smiles". More accurately, it is the Arabic name "Basem" (often incorrectly written in English as Bassem) that translates to "one who smiles". Basem is the agent noun of the Arabic verb with the root ba-sa-ma, which means to smile. The name "Bassam" is the exaggerated form of the agent noun (Arabic: صيغه مبالغه), and would therefore roughly translates to "one who smiles profusely". The name is most common in the Levant.

In English, Bassam is a toponymic surname.

Notable people with the name include:

== Given name ==
- Bassam Abu Abdullah, Syrian Ba'athist politician
- Bassam Hussam al-Din, Syrian militant leader
- Bassam Al-Hurayji (born 2000), Saudi Arabian footballer
- Bassam Al-Khatib (born 1975), Jordanian footballer
- Bassam Abdullah bin Bushar al-Nahdi (born 1976), Yemeni-Saudi suspected terrorist
- Bassam Al-Rawi (born 1997), Iraqi-born Qatari footballer
- Bassam al-Sabbagh (born 1969), Syrian politician and diplomat
- Bassam Al-Thawadi (born 1960), Bahraini filmmaker
- Bassam Almusallam, Kuwaiti writer
- Bassam as-Salhi (born 1960), Palestinian politician
- Bassam Badran (born 1972), Lebanese academic
- Bassam Beidas (born 1988), British-born Lebanese tennis player
- Bassam Dâassi (born 1980), Tunisian footballer
- Bassam el-Shammaa (born 1962), Egyptologist, lecturer
- Bassam Frangieh (born 1950), Scholar of Arabic literature and culture
- Bassam Ghanem (born 1986), Sports administrator
- Bassam Abou Hadid (born 1988), Egyptian footballer
- Bassam Hajjar (1955–2009), Lebanese poet, translator, literary critic
- Bassam Bashir Ibrahim (born 1960), Syrian politician
- Bassam Izzuddin, English professor of civil engineering
- Bassam Jamous, archaeologist
- Bassam Kanj (1965–2000), Lebanese-American Islamist militant
- Bassam Kousa (born 1954), Syrian film and TV actor
- Bassam Lotfi (1940–2022), Syrian actor
- Bassam Mahfouz, British politician
- Bassam Abdel Majeed (born 1950), former Syrian military officer, diplomat, and Minister of Interior
- Bassam Mawlawi (born 1968), Current Minister of interior and Municipalities of Lebanon
- Bassam Raouf (born 1968), Iraqi footballer and coach
- Bassam Saba (1958–2020), Lebanese musician
- Bassam Shakaa (1930–2019), Palestinian mayor
- Bassam Shakhashiri (born 1939), American chemist
- Bassam Shakir (born 2000), Iraqi footballer
- Bassam Abu Sharif (born 1946), Palestinian politician
- Bassam Tahhan, French-Syrian academic
- Bassam Talhouni (born 1964), Jordanian lawyer, academic and politician
- Bassam Tariq (born 1986), American film director
- Bassam Tibi (born 1944), Syrian–German professor of political science
- Bassam Tohme (born 1969), Syrian politician
- Bassam Yammine (born 1968), Lebanese businessman
- Bassam Zuamut (1951–2004), Israeli Arab actor

== Surname ==
- Bakr Bassam (born 1939), Egyptian weightlifter
- Ibn Bassam (1058–1147), Moorish writer
- Mohamed Bassam (born 1990), Egyptian footballer
- Rehab Bassam (born 1977), Egyptian writer
- Steve Bassam, Baron Bassam of Brighton (born 1953), British politician
- Sulayman Al-Bassam, (born 1972), Anglo-Kuwaiti playwright

== See also ==
- Bassem
- Basim (disambiguation)
- Grand-Bassam
