= Bassem =

Basim, Basem or Bassem (Arabic: بَاسِم Bāsim) is a common Arabic name meaning "one who smiles". A more accurate proper spelling in English is Basim, as there is no stress (Shadda) on the "s" syllable in the Arabic original. The name stems from the Arabic verb basama (Arabic: َبَسَم) meaning "to smile".

Notable people with the name include:

- Bassem Amin (born 1988), Egyptian chess player
- Bassem Awadallah (born 1964), Jordanian public figure
- Bassem Balaa (born 1981), Lebanese basketball player
- Bassem Ben Nasser (born 1982), Tunisian footballer
- Bassem Boulaâbi (born 1984), Tunisian footballer
- Bassem Breish, Lebanese film director and writer
- Bassem Eid (born 1958), Palestinian human rights activist
- Bassem Feghali (born 1978), Lebanese comedian and drag queen
- Bassem Hamad al-Dawiri (1973–2007), Iraqi sculptor and artist
- Bassem Hassan Mohammed (born 1987), Qatari equestrian
- Bassem Marmar (born 1977), Lebanese football player and manager
- Bassem Nasr (born 1981), Lebanese-born Swedish politician
- Bassem Ouda (born 1970), Egyptian politician
- Bassem Sabeh (born 1951), Lebanese journalist and politician
- Bassem Sabry (1982–2014), Egyptian journalist and civil rights campaigner
- Bassem Srarfi (born 1997), Tunisian footballer
- Bassem al-Tamimi (born 1967), Palestinian activist
- Bassem Yakhour (born 1971), Syrian actor, writer and director
- Bassem Youssef (born 1974), Egyptian political satirist
- Bassem Youssef (FBI agent), Egyptian-American law enforcement official

== See also ==
- Bassam (disambiguation)
- Basim (disambiguation)
