= 2005 Speaker of the Lebanese Parliament election =

| ← 2000 | 28 June 2005 | 2009 → |

Needed to Win: Majority of votes cast 128 deputies, 65 needed for a majority
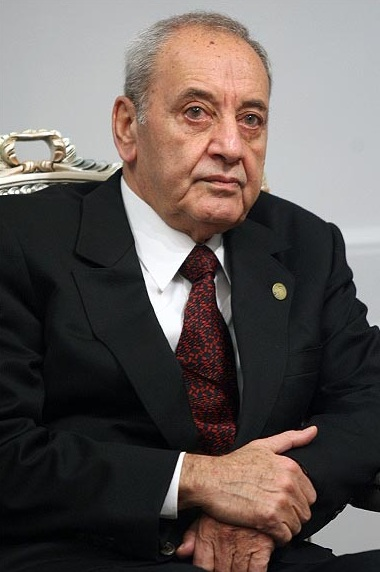
| | Majority party |
|---|---|
| Candidate | Nabih Berri |
| Party | Amal |
| Leader's seat | Zahrany |
| Deputies' vote | 90 |
| Percentage | 70.3% |
Speaker before election
Nabih Berri
Amal
Elected Speaker
Nabih Berri
Amal

The 2005 Speaker of the Lebanese Parliament election was the 4th legislative speaker election since the implementation of the Taif Agreement, held on 28 June 2005 during the first session of the 18th parliament. The incumbent Speaker Nabih Berri and head of the Amal Movement was re-elected to a fourth term.

Under the article 44 of the constitution, the speaker is elected at the start of each parliamentary cycle by an absolute majority of the deputies' vote. By convention, he is always a Shia Muslim.

Berri won the majority of the votes cast, receiving 90 votes and 70.3% out of 128 deputies.

== Vote ==
Election for Speaker of the 20th Parliament
| Party | Candidate | Votes | % |
|---|---|---|---|
| Amal | Nabih Berri | 90 | 70 |
| Future Movement | Bassem Sabeh | 1 | 0.8 |
| Total votes | | 128 | 100 |
