= 2009 Speaker of the Lebanese Parliament election =

← 2005	25 June 2009	2018 →

Needed to Win: Majority of votes cast 128 deputies, 65 needed for a majority
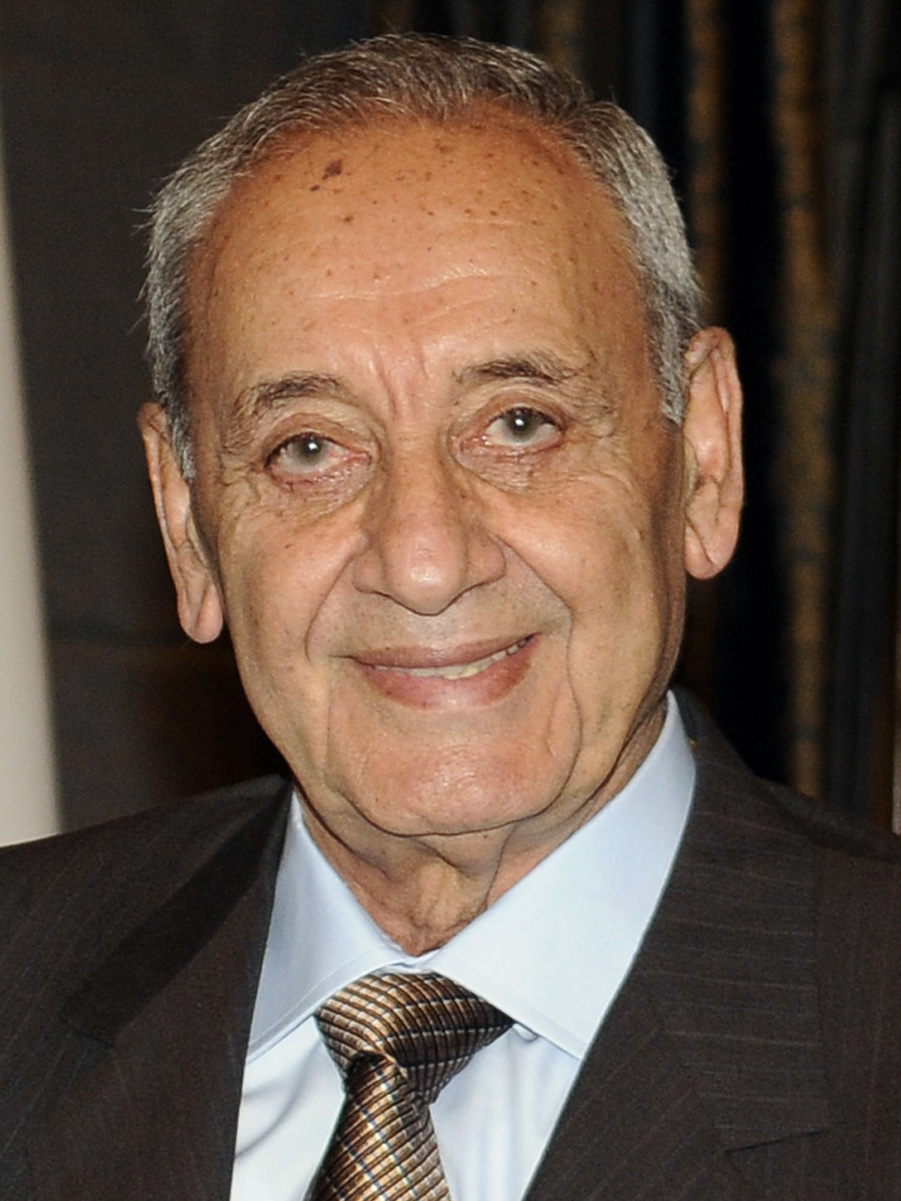

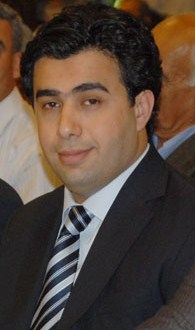
	Majority party	Minority party
Candidate	Nabih Berri	Okab Sakr
Party	Amal	Future Movement
Leader's seat	Zahrany	Zahle
Deputies' vote	90	1
Percentage	70.3%	0.7%
Speaker before election
Nabih Berri
Amal
Elected Speaker
Nabih Berri
Amal

The 2009 Speaker of the Lebanese Parliament election was the 5th legislative speaker election since the implementation of the Taif Agreement, held on 25 June 2009 during the first session of the 23rd parliament. The incumbent Speaker Nabih Berri and head of the Amal Movement was re-elected to a fifth term.

Under the article 44 of the constitution, the speaker is elected at the start of each parliamentary cycle by an absolute majority of the deputies' vote. By convention, he is always a Shia Muslim.

Berri won the majority of the votes cast, receiving 90 votes and 70.3% out of 128 deputies.

== Vote ==
Election for Speaker of the 21st Parliament
Party	Candidate	Votes	%
Amal	Nabih Berri	90	70
Free Patriotic Movement	Abbas Hashim	3	3.8
Future Movement	Okab Sakr	1	0.7
Future Movement	Ghazi Youssef	1	0.8
Total votes		128	100
