= History of the Arab Socialist Ba'ath Party – Syria Region =

Aspect of Syrian political history

This article details the history of the Syrian Regional Branch of the Ba'ath Party (the original one and that of the Syrian-dominated group).

== Founding and early years ==
The Ba'ath Party was founded on 7 April 1947 by Michel Aflaq – a Christian, Salah al-Din al-Bitar – a Sunni Muslim and Zaki al-Arsuzi – an Alawite. It was a merger of the Arab Ba'ath, founded and led by al-Arsuzi, and the Arab Ba'ath Movement, led by Aflaq and al-Bitar, which established the party. The party initially was a vehicle for the national liberation movement against French rule in Syria and Lebanon. Soon after, the Ba'ath Party established itself as a critic of the perceived ideological inefficiencies of old Syrian nationalism. Pan-Arabism became popular among Arabs after World War II.

Aflaq, the main originator of Ba'athist ideology, drew heavily from Islam and its values. He wrote that the time of Muhammad represented the ideal Arab community and that the Arabs had fallen under the rule of the Ottoman Empire and the Europeans. Ba'ath means restoration, and the party's programme called for Arab restoration through modernisation. The most important influence upon Alfaq and al-Bitar was European socialism, which became the basis of their Arab socialism.

The party was formally established at its founding congress under the name Arab Ba'ath Party. According to the congress, the party was "nationalist, populist, socialist, and revolutionary" and believed in the "unity and freedom of the Arab nation within its homeland." The party opposed the theory of class conflict, but supported the nationalisation of major industries, the unionisation of workers, land reform, and supported private inheritance and private property rights to some degree. Party membership increased from around 100 to 4,500 by the early 1950s; most members were either teachers or students. The Ba'ath Party merged with the Arab Socialist Party (ASP), led by Akram al-Hawrani, to establish the Arab Socialist Ba'ath Party in Lebanon following Adib Shishakli's rise to power. The merger gave the Ba'ath movement its first peasant constituency; the ASP's stronghold was Hama. Most ASP members did not adhere to the merger and remained, according to George Alan, "passionately loyal to Hawrani's person." The merger was so weak that the ASP's original infrastructure remained intact. With the rise of Gamal Abdel Nasser in Egypt and Arab nationalism, the Ba'ath Party grew rapidly. In 1955, the party decided to support Nasser and his pan-Arab policies.

== Elections, the UAR and factionalism: 1954–1961 ==
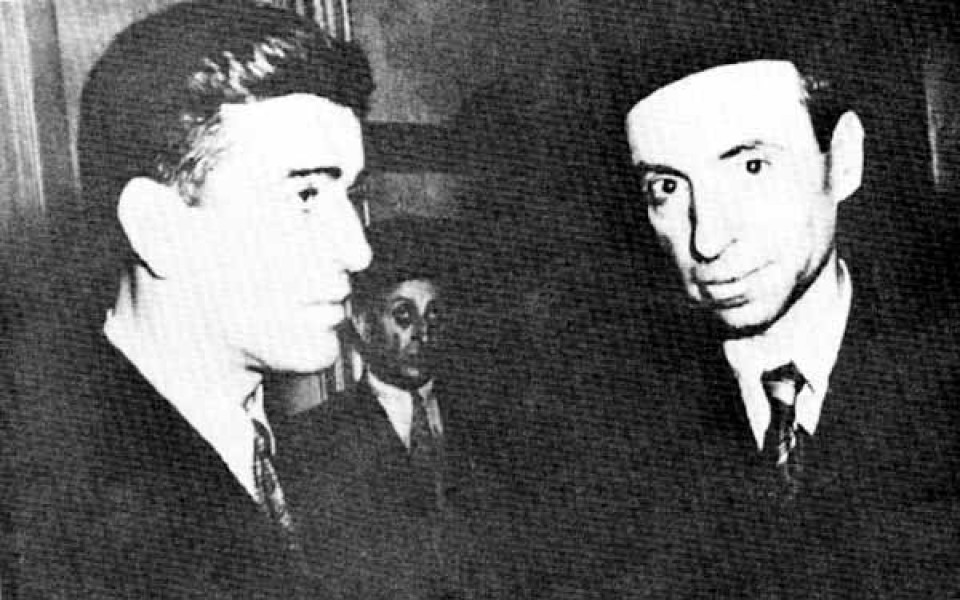
Akram al-Hawrani (left) with Michel Aflaq as seen in 1957.

Syrian politics took a dramatic turn in 1954 when the military government of Adib al-Shishakli was overthrown and the democratic system restored. The Ba'ath, now a large and popular organisation, won 15 out of 142 parliamentary seats in the Syrian election that year, becoming the second-largest party in parliament. Most of the new members of parliament were independents. The Ba'ath Party was one of the most organised parties in parliament, rivaled only by the Syrian Communist Party (SCP) and the People's Party. The SCP and the Ba'ath Party were the only parties able to organise mass protests among workers.

The Ba'ath Party was supported by the intelligentsia because of their pro-Egyptian and anti-imperialist stance and their advocation of social reform. The Ba'ath faced considerable competition from ideological enemies, notably the Syrian Social Nationalist Party (SSNP), which supported the establishment of a Greater Syria. The Ba'ath Party's main adversary was the SCP, whose support for class struggle and internationalism was anathema to the Ba'ath. All these parties competed with each other and Islamists in street-level activity and sought support among the military.

The assassination of Ba'athist colonel Adnan al-Malki by a member of the SSNP in April 1955 allowed the Ba'ath Party and its allies to launch a crackdown, thus eliminating one rival. In 1957, the Ba'ath Party partnered with the SCP to weaken the power of Syria's conservative parties. By the end of that year, the SCP weakened the Ba'ath Party to such an extent that in December the Ba'ath Party drafted a bill calling for a union with Egypt, a move that was very popular. The union between Egypt and Syria went ahead and the United Arab Republic (UAR) was created, and the Ba'ath Party was banned in the UAR because of Nasser's hostility to parties other than his own. The Ba'ath leadership dissolved the party in 1958, gambling that the legalisation of certain parties would hurt the SCP more than it would the Ba'ath.

Meanwhile, a small group of Syrian Ba'athist officers stationed in Egypt watched the party's poor position and the increasing fragility of the union with alarm. They formed a secret military committee whose initial members were Lieutenant-Colonel Muhammad Umran, Major Salah Jadid and Captain Hafez al-Assad. At first, the committee did not play a political role in the Ba'athist movement; its unclear whether leading Ba'athist officials knew of the Military Committee's existence before the 8th of March Revolution.

Militant secularism was emphasized in the "Declaration of Principles" manifesto published by the Ba'ath party in 1960; which declared that the party's "educational policy" was to build a "new generation of Arabs that believes in the unity of the nation and the eternity of its mission". The manifesto also stated that this envisaged Ba'athist generation would be "committed to scientific thought freed from the shackles of superstition and backward customs" and replace religion with Arab nationalism as their belief system.

A military coup in Damascus in 1961 brought the UAR to an end. Sixteen prominent politicians, including al-Hawrani and Salah al-Din al-Bitar – who later retracted his signature, signed a statement supporting the coup. The Ba'athists won several seats during the 1961 parliamentary election.

== Revolution and the 1966 split: 1962–1966 ==
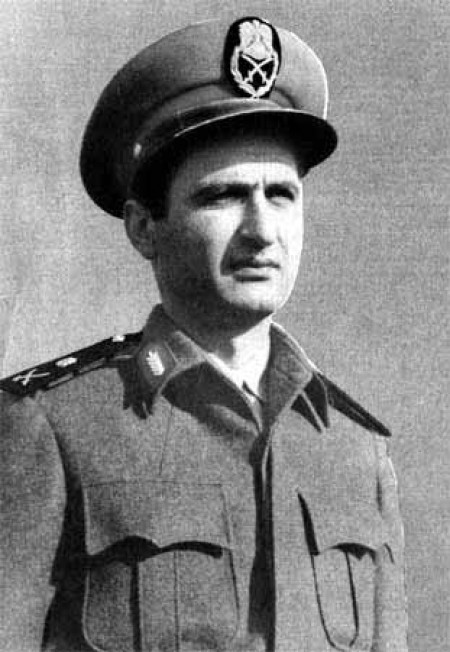
Jadid, one of the leading members of the Military Committee, and the leader of the 1966 coup

The secession from the UAR was a time of crisis for the party; several groups, including al-Hawrani, left the Ba'ath Party. al-Hawrani formally resigned on 20 June 1962 and re-established the ASP, but his popular appeal had weakened over the years, and the ASP's only electoral stronghold was the Hama Governorate. In 1962, Aflaq convened a congress which re-established the Ba'ath Party. The division in the original Ba'ath Party between the National Command led by Michel Aflaq and the “regionalists” in the Syrian party stemmed from the break-up of the United Arab Republic. Aflaq had sought to control the regionalist elements – an incoherent grouping led by Fa'iz al-Jasim, Yusuf Zuayyin, Munir al-Abdallah and Ibrahim Makhus. The regionalists hailed from towns in the Syrian periphery, where local Ba'ath Party structures had not dissolved during the years of union with Nasser. Aflaq retained the support of the majority of the non-Syrian National Command members (13 at the time).

Aflaq convened the Fifth Congress in Homs. Al-Hawrani was not invited; cells that had defied Aflaq's orders and remained active, and Ba'athists who become Nasserists during the period of the UAR, were not invited to the congress. Aflaq was re-elected the National Command's Secretary General, and ordered the re-establishment of the Syrian-regional Ba'ath organisation. During the congress, Aflaq and the Military Committee, through Muhammad Umran, made contact for the first time; the committee asked for permission to initiate a coup d'état, which Aflaq supported. The Military Committee did not show itself to the civilian wing of the party at this congress.

Following the success of the February 1963 coup d'état in Iraq, led by the Ba'ath Party's Iraqi cell, the Military Committee hastily convened to plan a coup against Nazim al-Kudsi's presidency. The coup – dubbed the 8th of March Revolution – was successful and a Ba'athist government was installed in Syria. The plotters' first order was to establish the National Council of the Revolutionary Command (NCRC), which consisted entirely of Ba'athists and Nasserists, and was controlled by military personnel rather than civilians.

While the Ba'ath Party had attained power, it experienced problems with internal infighting. The Military Committee, which was a tiny minority of the already small Ba'ath Party membership, was forced to rule by force. The Ba'ath Party, which had only 2,500 members by mid-1963, lacked a popular base. Hanna Batatu called the period from 1963 to 1970 the "Transitional Ba'ath"; she wrote that the "Old Ba'ath" was removed and was replaced with the "Neo Ba'ath" led by Salah Jadid and Hafez al-Assad in 1966. The neo-Ba'ath also made drastic changes to foreign policy, by aligning Syria with the Soviet Bloc. Following the Sixth National Congress, the party publicly adopted the doctrine of close alliance with Soviet Bloc:

"The Arab Socialist Ba'th Party had placed the question of the struggle against imperialism in its international and human framework and considered the socialist camp a positive, active force in the struggle against imperialism... a homeland crushed and exploited by imperialism render the fundamental starting points of the socialist camp more harmonious with the interests of our Arab homeland and more in sympathy with our Arab people."

The civilian wing was riven with infighting between the radical socialist and moderate factions, while the military was more unified. The Syrian Regional Command slowly amassed powers by weakening the National Command, culminating in the 1966 Syrian coup d'état. According to Batatu, the power struggle was not ideological in character:

The internal party discords were never purely sectarian or purely regional in character... Often personal factors or aspirations for sheer power were at play. Ideological affinities had some role but do not appear to have been decisive. To be sure, the labels 'leftists' and 'rightists' were freely tossed about. But the political conduct of the period's central figure, Salah Jadid, did not point to a clear or consistent ideological commitment."

Jadid served as the Assistant Secretary of the Regional Command of the party in Syria, while General Amin al-Hafiz served as Regional Secretary. al-Hafiz removed Jadid as the Chief of Staff of the Armed Forces, which forced Jadid to concentrate on building a support base within the party. On 21 December 1965 the National Command dissolved the Syrian Regional Command and on 18 February 1966, Aflaq denounced the Jadid group as a regional separatist deviation. A coup d'état took place on 23 February 1966, the bloodiest coup Syria had experienced since 1949. Jadid and the Syrian Regional Command, backed by army units under their control, seized power. Other leaders of the coup were Hafez al-Assad – an Alawite general, and Nureddin al-Atassi. The new rulers of Syria expelled the former members of the National Command from the party and from Syria. Aflaq and Bitar were released from jail and went into exile shortly after the coup. This effectively split the Ba'ath Party National Command in two: one based in Syria, the other in Iraq. In Syria, Ba'athist civilian politicians were made leaders of state institutions; Atassi became President, Yusuf Zuayyin became Prime Minister and Ibrahim Makhus became Minister for Foreign Affairs. Jadid sought to avoid suspicions against a military dictatorship and did not formally join the government. During an attempted coup in September 1966, Jadid formed "Workers Battalions", inspired by the Red Guards of the People's Republic of China, to defend the government.

== Assad Era: 1970–2024 ==
After the 1967 Six-Day War, tensions between Jadid and Al-Assad increased, and al-Assad and his associates were strengthened by their hold on the military. In late 1968, they began dismantling Jadid's support network, facing ineffectual resistance from the civilian branch of the party that remained under Jadid's control. This duality of power persisted until the Corrective Revolution of November 1970, when al-Assad ousted and imprisoned Atassi and Jadid. He then set upon a project of rapid institution-building, reopened parliament and adopted a permanent constitution for the country, which had been ruled by military fiat and a provisional constitutional documents since 1963.

=== 8th Regional Congress: 1985–2000 ===
The 8th Regional Congress (held 5–20 January 1985), the last held under the stewardship of Hafez al-Assad, elected the Central Committee, which in turn elected the 21-strong Regional Command. Due to the centralized nature of Syrian politics, Hafez al-Assad did not hold another Regional Congress so as to undermine the potential of other senior party leaders of establishing their own independent power bases. While the Central Committee was active from 1985 to 2000, it rarely met and was used as a tool to rubber stamp decisions.

The following is a list of people elected to the 8th Regional Command;

Regional Command members
1. Hafez al-Assad; 2. Abdullah al-Ahmar; 3. Zuhair Masharqa; 4. Abdul Halim Khaddam; 5. Rifaat al-Assad; 6. Mahmoud Zuabi; 7. Abd al-Rauf al-Qasem; 8. Mustafa Tlas; 9. Izzeddin Nasir; 10. Tawfiq Salha; 11. Said Hamadi; 12. Sulayman Qaddah; 13. Walid Hamdun; 14. Wahib Tannous; 15. Abd al-Qadir Qaddura; 16. Hikmat al-Shihabi; 17. Ahmad Qabalan; 18. Abd al-Razzaq Ayyoub; 19. Ahmad Dargham; 20. Fayez Nasir; 21. Rashid Akhtarini
Regional Command Bureau heads
Popular Organization Bureau	Rashid Akhtarini	National Security Bureau	Abd al-Rauf al-Qasem
Organization Bureau	Fayez Nasir	Ideology and Indoctrination Bureau	Ahmad Dargham
Military Bureau	Mustafa Tlas	Education Bureau	Abd al-Razzaq Ayyoub
Peasants Bureau	Ahmad Qabalan	Bureau of Youth and Sport	Walid Hamdun
Higher Education Bureau	Wahib Tannous	Professional Unions' Bureau	Tawfiq Salah
Bureau of Workers	Izzeddin Nasser		

Hafez al-Assad died in office as President of Syria, Secretary General of the National Command and Regional Secretary of the Regional Command on 10 June 2000, his son Bashar al-Assad succeeded him as President and as Regional Secretary of the Regional Command on 17 June and 24 June respectively, with Abdullah al-Ahmar succeeded him de facto as Secretary General of the National Command through his office of Assistant Secretary General – Hafez, even if dead, is still the de jure Secretary General of the National Command.

=== 9th Regional Congress: 2000–2005 ===
The convocation of the 9th Regional Congress had been planned by Hafez al-Assad, but died before it could be convened. Sulayman Qaddah was elected the congress' chair. While the congress was planned to last five days, it was reduced to three "so as to accelerate the procedures of Assad’s candidacy for presidency". 950 delegates attended the congress, while 200 members of the National Progressive Front attended as observes. The 9th Regional Congress (held 17–21 June 2000) elected a new Regional Command, composed of 21 new members. On 19 June it was announced that Bashar al-Assad would chair a six-man committee responsible for selecting candidates for the 9th Regional Command. The committee was composed of Bashar al-Assad, Abdul Halim Khaddam, Zuhair Masharqa, Mustafa Tlass, Abdullah al-Ahmar and Sulayman Qaddah.

It is noticeable that Izzuddin Nasir and Rasheed Ikhtarini were not appointed to the 9th Regional Command. However, it is rumoured that Ikhtarini was dropped because he was found guilty of corruption. Bashar al-Assad was elected Regional Secretary two days after the congress by the newly elected Regional Command. The following is a list of members of the 9th Regional Command:

1. Bashar al-Assad
2. Abdullah al-Ahmar (incumbent)
3. Abdul Halim Khaddam (incumbent)
4. Sulayman Qaddah (incumbent)
5. Zuhair Masharqa (incumbent)
6. Abd al-Qadir Qaddura (incumbent)
7. Fayez Nasir (incumbent)
8. Ahmad Dargham (incumbent)
9. Mustafa Tlass (incumbent)
10. Walid Hamdun (incumbent)
11. Muhammad Mustafa Mero
12. Muhammad Naji al-Otari
13. Farouk al-Shara
14. Sallam Yassine
15. Ibrahim Hneidi
16. Faruq Abu Shamat
17. Ghiyab Barakat
18. Walid al-Bouz
19. Mohammad al-Hussein
20. Majed Shaddoud
21. Muhammad Said Bakhitan

At the 9th Regional Congress, the first such meeting since December 1985, Bashar al-Assad emphasized the need to rejuvenate the image of the Ba'ath Party and its ideology. For the first under al-Assad rule, elections for seats in the 9th Regional Congress were contested democratically. The result was that several young Ba'athists were elected to the pinnacle of party power. Of the 90 Central Committee members elected at the congress, 62 of them were new. At the same time, Assad reduced military representation in the Regional Command, while increasing its share on the Central Committee.

The economic situation was widely discussed at the 9th Regional Congress. Several delegates proposed copying the economic reforms in China. The reason is due to the similarities the countries shared, being that China is a one-party system which reformed from a central planned economy to a socialist market economy. Bashar al-Assad supported introducing Chinese-like reforms in Syria, but as would be proved later, parties with a financial interest in the status quo and ideological opposition worked hard against such measures.

=== 10th Regional Congress: 2005–2024 ===
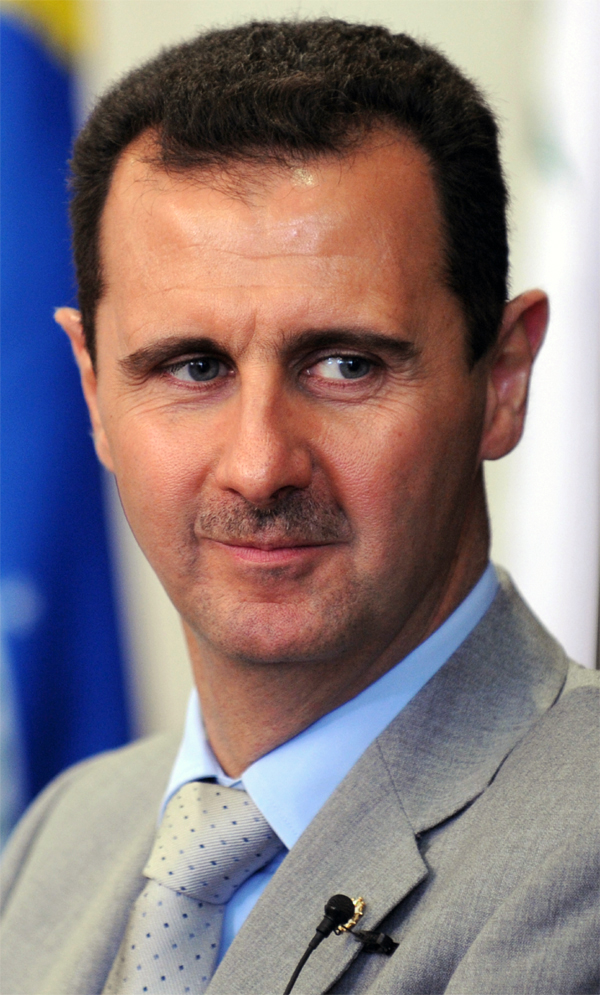
Bashar al-Assad, the Regional Secretary of the Regional Command of the Ba'ath Party in Syria and state president

The 10th Regional Command elected Sulayman Qaddah and Walid al-Bouz to be the chair and deputy chair respectively of the 10th Regional Congress (held 6–9 June 2005). The 10th Regional Congress was held under the slogan "development, renewal and reform". The reformist trend within the party was active during the campaigning to be elected as a delegate to the 10th Regional Congress. Those who were elected called for administrative and servants reforms and improving the public sector, while criticizing the opportunism of top-level party cadres, but not criticizing Bashar al-Assad, and the systems of clientelism and patronage. However, due to undemocratic procedures in the elections of delegates, reformist party cadres were not able to stand for election to the 10th Regional Congress. This led to protests in Damascus, and most noteworthy, the University of Damascus. The party leadership responded to these pressures by approving 100–150 cadres as candidates. However, in the end, reformists candidates failed to be elected due to the undemocratic party system. Several old, leading central-level cadres, such as Zuhayr Ibrahim Jabour of Latakia University and Ahmad al-Hajj Ali, a member of the Committee to Develop Party Thought of the Ba'ath Party and former head of the party's Bureau of the Central Committee, voiced support for the reformers, and called for democratizing the party system.

The congress elected a new Regional Command, which was composted of 14-members, a drop from 21-members elected at the 9th Regional Congress. The most visible change decided at the congress was the replacement of the majority of "old guard" Regional Command members with Bashar-loyalists. "Old guard" members who were replaced or resigned includes vice presidents Khaddam and Muhammad Zuhayr Masharqa, Mustafa Tlass, Assistant Secretary General of the National Command Abdullah al-Ahmar, Assistant Regional Secretary Sulayman Qaddah, former Speaker of Parliament Abd al-Qadir Qaddura and former prime minister Muhammad Mustafa Mero. Several Bashar loyalists who joined the Regional Command at the 9th Regional Congress were also replaced, among these were Bahjat Sulayman, Majid Shadoud, Ghiyab Barakat and Walid al-Bouz. The new members were more often than not seasoned politicians, among these were Muhammad Said Bakhitan, the current Assistant Regional Secretary, and Hisham Ikhtiyar, the head of the Ba'athi National Security Bureau. The resignation of Khaddam was in many ways surprising seeing that he was the second most visible icon of the Ba'ath government after Hafez al-Assad. His removal signalled the ascendancy of Bashar al-Assad to leadership while on the opposite, the fall of the old guard and of those who opposed dynastic rule. The following is a list of 10th Regional Command members;

Regional Command members
1. Bashar al-Assad (incumbent); 2. Mahmoud al-Abrash; 3. Mohammad Naji al-Otari (incumbent); 4. Farouk al-Shara (incumbent); 5. Mohammad al-Hussein (incumbent); 6. Hassan Turkmani; 7. Hisham Ikhtiyar; 8. Osama bin Hamed Adi; 9. Yasser Tawfiq Hourieh; 10. Bassam Janbieh; 11. Said Daoud Eliya; 12. Muhammad Said Bakhitan (incumbent); 13. Haitham Satayhi; 14. Shahinaz Fakoush
Regional Command Bureau heads
Bureau of the Secretariat	Muhammad Said Bakhitan	National Security Bureau	Hisham Ikhtiyar
Organization Bureau	Said Daoud Eliya	Preparation Bureau	Haitham Satayhi
Military Bureau	Mustafa Tlas	Bureau of Education and Scouts	Yasser Tawfiq Hourieh
Bureau of Peasants	Osama bin Hamed Adi	Finance Bureau	Muhammad Said Bakhitan
Legal Bureau	Bassam Janbieh	National Economy Bureau	Mohammad al-Hussein
Bureau of Students	Yasser Tawfiq Hourieh	Bureau of Youth and Sport	Shahinaz Fakoush
Bureau of Higher Education and Scientific Research	Yasser Tawfiq Hourieh	Bureau of Professional Associations	Bassam Janbieh
Bureau of Workers	Osama bin Hamed Adi		

At the congress, Bashar emphasized that "the party does not own the state", and stated that the Prime Minister and the government should be independent from the party. The congress also discussed the possibility of introducing the market economy in Syria. It was eventually decided that the "social market economy" would be introduced, while at the same time introducing safeguards so that Syria would not be engulfed in the global capitalist system. However, it was decided at the Regional Congress that both the Prime Minister and the speaker of parliament had to be members of the Regional Command, hence weakening the officeholder's respective powers. The congress discussed the possibility of changing the party's name from the Arab Socialist Ba'ath Party to either the Arab Socialist Ba'ath Party in the Syrian Region, to downplay the party's Arab nationalist credentials, or to the Democratic Ba'ath Party, downplaying the party's socialist credentials. There were even some who recommended changing the party's slogan from "unity, liberty, socialism" to "unity, democracy, social justice", so as to strengthen the party's democratic appeal. Some even floated the idea of defining the party as a “democratic socialist national [pan-Arab] political organization which struggles for achieving the great goals of the Arab Nation for Unity, Freedom and Socialism,” based on “the principles of citizenship and democracy and respect of human rights and implementation of justice among citizens.” At last, there were talks of dissolving both the Regional and National Commands and replace it with a proposed Party Command, so as to make Bashar al-Assad the party's Secretary General.

Up to the 10th Regional Congress, it was rumoured that Bashar al-Assad was a closet reformer who sought to introduce a market economy and liberal democratic thoughts into Syria. For those who believed these rumours the 10th Regional Congress was a disappointment. The party's doctrine was not changed, but downplayed and were reduced to slogans. Mention of Arab unity in the Ba'athi constitution is mentioned once, in passing, and the demand that other Arab countries undergo a revolution to introduce socialism was removed. In general, the 10th Regional Congress reversed the trend of strengthening the party, and the party again became an institution to control the public. A central motif at the congress was the need to "re-activate" the party, however, while dully supported at the congress, there are no signs that the party has become more active or dynamic. The congress officially supported further democratization of society, the separation of the party from government to certain degrees, economic reform, and an anti-corruption campaign.

==== Syrian Civil War: 2011–2024 ====
Syrian Ba'ath (alternative logo) has stopped functioning as a political organization because of the Syrian civil war

According to foreign analysts the Ba'ath Party has played a minor role in the Syrian Civil War, becoming more of a symbolic force in the Assad's government fight to stay in power. In areas Ba'ath Party institutions have all but collapsed, the authorities have responded by establishing state institutions to take their place, leaving party cadres in certain places leaderless. According to Souhaïl Belhadj, the author of The Syria of Bashar Al-Asad – Anatomy of an Authoritarian Regime (Belin Publisher: La Syrie de Bashar al-Asad. Anatomie d'un régime authoritaire) "The Regional Command’s loss of influence has spread to lower levels of government as well. Today, apart from the party branch of the security forces, all branches of the Baath, whether at the governorate or district level, are nonoperational. They are no longer able to lead the political process, report to the Regional Command concerning the situation on the ground, or provide economic and social information. In addition, Regional Command leaders witnessed the alienation, and indeed defection, of branch secretaries—the Baath Party’s most senior representatives in the provinces." Former Ba'ath officials who have defected have claimed that up to half of the 2.5 million members (a figure dating before the Syrian civil war) have left the party. The party's headquarters in Homs and Deraa have been destroyed. While the remnants of the provincial-level tier of the Ba'ath Party structure still remains intact, the district-level has progressively fallen apart, and will continue to do so. The municipal councils, which are controlled by Ba'ath majority representation, "are in a state of total disarray." To take on example of the party's deterioration, when the Deraa branch asked 3,000–4,000 party cadres to hold a political rally in support of the Assad government, less than 100 people showed up. This resulted in the branch secretary being forced to "hold a modest meeting instead."

The Regional Command is not in control of the country's civil service anymore, having lost that position to the military and the security forces. While its supposed to be in charge of setting policy on how to deal with the civil war, it has been relegated to a subordinate role. The Central Committee and the Military Bureau have suffered the same faith. After holding several grassroots election to elect the delegates to the 11th Regional Congress, the congress, because of the civil war, was postponed indefinitely in February 2012.

Because of the Syrian civil war, a referendum on a new constitution was held on 26 February 2012. The constitution was approved by the populace, and the article stating that Ba'ath Party was "the leading party of society and state" was removed and the constitution was ratified on 27 February.

On 8 July 2013 the Central Committee, convening for the first time since 2005, elected a new Regional Command, composed of 16-members. Bashar al-Assad convened the meeting to discuss the performance Ba'ath Party and its cadres in overcoming the current situation facing Syria. According to the Syrian Arab News Agency "The members' speeches dealt with the Party's performance during the crisis and its role in defending the homeland, while other speeches criticized the role of al-Baath cadres at this delicate stage as it 'fell short of the desired performance.'" Bassam Abu Abdullah, director of the Damascus Centre for Strategic Studies, believed changes were made because "There has been a lot of criticism from within the base towards the leadership, which has been accused of being inflexible, both before and since the crisis [...] A complete change indicates the failure of leadership and the dissatisfaction from within the Baath party base". Syrian commentator Adnan Abdul Razak believed the changes to be cosmetic only, stating "Assad changed names but did not change the role of the Baath command as a mere loyal supporter to Bashar Assad". The following is a list of members of the now reformed 10th Regional Command;

Regional Command members
1. Bashar al-Assad (incumbent); 2. Wael al-Halqi; 3. Mohammad Jihad al-Laham; 4. Ammar Saati; 5. Imad Khamis; 6. Mohammad Shaaban Azzouz; 7. Hilal Hilal Amin; 8. Abdul-Nasser Shafi; 9. Abdul-Mo'ti al-Mashlab; 10. Fairouz Moussa; 11. Rakan al-Shoufi; 12. Youssef al-Ahmad; 13. Najm al-Ahmad; 14. Khalaf al-Miftah; 15. Hussein Arnous; 16. Malek Ali
Regional Command Bureau heads
Bureau of the Secretariat	Yusuf Ahmed	National Security Bureau	Ali Mamlouk
Organization Bureau	Abdul-Mo'ti al-Mashlab	Bureau of Education and Scouts	Fairouz Moussa
Bureau of Peasants	Abdel Nasser Shafi	Bureau of Youth and Sport	Ammar Saati
Bureau of Higher Education	Fairouz Moussa	Bureau of Professional Associations	Rakan al-Shoufi
Bureau of Workers	Mohammad Shaaban Azzouz	Bureau of Culture and Information	Yusuf Ahmed

Two days later, in an official interview with Bashar al-Assad, he stated that the ousted Regional Command members were removed because they made "mistakes". He further added that "This is the real role of the Central Committee, which his supposed to hold accountable the leaders [Regional Command members] on a regular basis. This did not happen in recent years". He concluded that the Central Committee had failed in its task, but that it would no longer be the case.

=== Fall of the Assad regime and party dissolution: 2024–2025 ===
On 8 December 2024, the Assad regime collapsed during a major offensive by opposition forces. The offensive was led by Hay'at Tahrir al-Sham (HTS) and supported mainly by the Syrian National Army as part of the Syrian civil war that began with the Syrian Revolution in 2011. The capture of Damascus marked the end of the Assad family's rule, which had governed Syria as a hereditary sectarian totalitarian regime since Hafez al-Assad assumed power in 1971 following a coup d'état. As a rebel coalition moved closer to Damascus, reports indicated that Bashar al-Assad had fled the capital by plane to Russia, where he joined his exiled family and was granted political asylum by the Russian government. After his departure, opposition forces announced their victory on state television. At the same time, Russia's Ministry of Foreign Affairs confirmed his resignation and departure from Syria.

Following the fall of the Assad regime, the Ba'ath Party's Central Command published a statement in its newspaper, Al-Ba'ath, announcing its intention to cooperate with the Syrian caretaker government, which was then led by members of HTS, in order to "defend the unity of the country, its land, people, institutions, and capabilities." The statement also called for reforms to promote political pluralism and the separation of powers. Two days later, an internal statement on December 11 was circulated among members and published on Al-Ba'ath which announced the suspension of all party activities "until further notice" and the handover of all vehicles and weapons belonging to the party to the Ministry of Interior as well as all party funds to the Ministry of Finance, with the property's proceeds going towards the Central Bank of Syria so as to be spent by the caretaker government "according to the law"; the Al-Sham Private University was also announced to be placed under the supervision of the Ministry of Higher Education while all other party assets were to be transferred to the Ministry of Justice, including the former headquarters of the party, where it was turned into a settlement center for former members of the army and security forces who served under Assad.

On 29 January 2025, at the Syrian Revolution Victory Conference, Military Operations Command spokesman Hassan Abdul Ghani announced the dissolution of the People's Assembly and its committees; the dissolution of the former regime's army and the establishment of a new army; the dissolution of the Ba'athist regime's intelligence and security apparatuses and the militias it had established; the dissolution of the Syrian Arab Socialist Ba'ath Party and the member parties of the National Progressive Front; the abolition of the 2012 Syrian constitution; and the suspension of all exceptional laws.

== See also ==
- History of the Ba'ath Party
