= 2018 Speaker of the Lebanese Parliament election =

← 2009	23 May 2018	2022 →

Needed to Win: Majority of votes cast 128 deputies, 65 needed for a majority
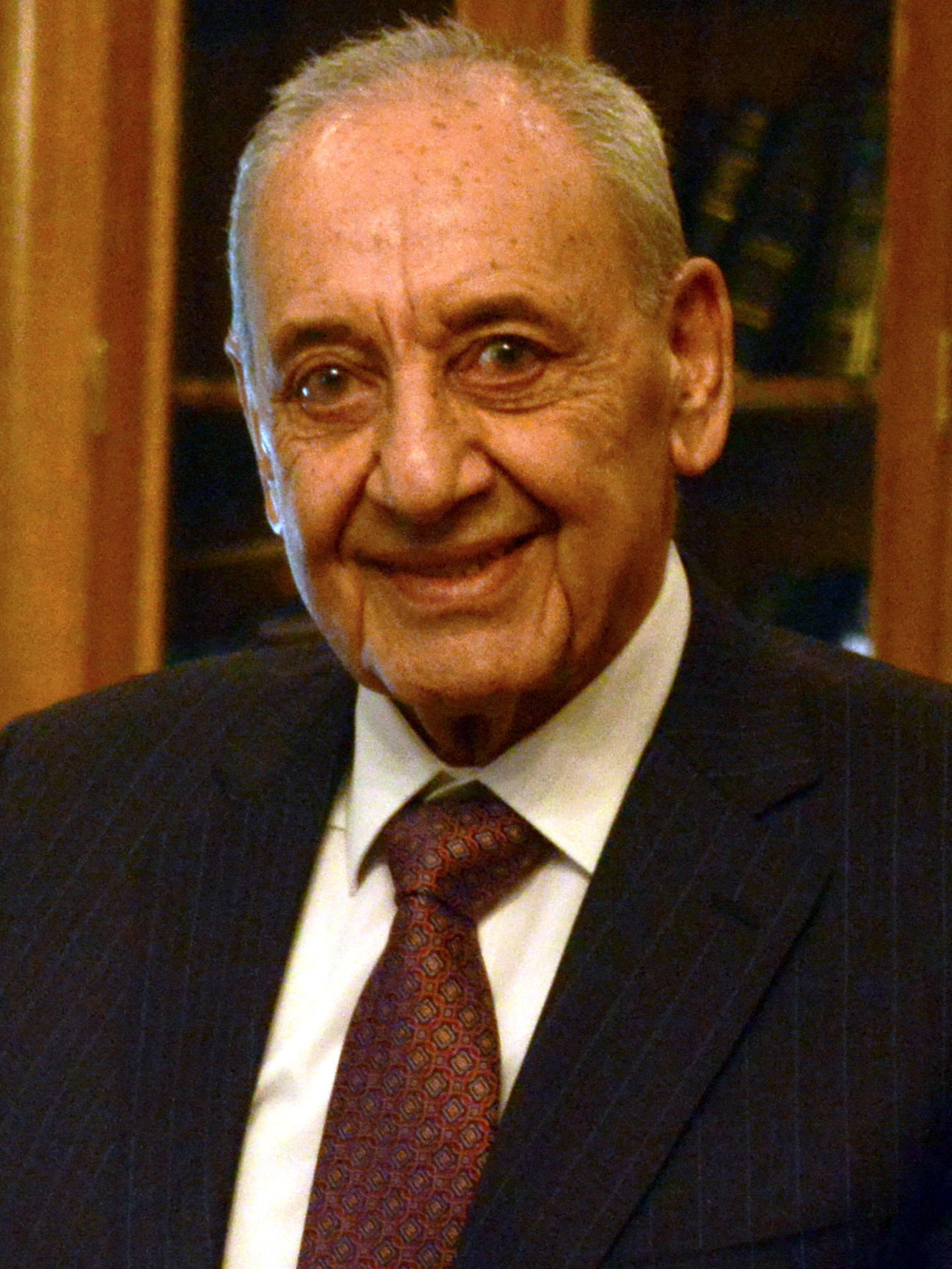
	Majority party
Candidate	Nabih Berri
Party	Amal
Leader's seat	Zahrani
Deputies' vote	98
Percentage	76.5%
Speaker before election
Nabih Berri
Amal
Elected Speaker
Nabih Berri
Amal

The 2018 Speaker of the Lebanese Parliament election was the 6th legislative speaker election since the implementation of the Taif Agreement, held on 23 May 2018 during the first session of the 23rd parliament. The incumbent Speaker Nabih Berri and head of the Amal Movement was re-elected to a sixth term.

Under the article 44 of the constitution, the speaker is elected at the start of each parliamentary cycle by an absolute majority of the deputies' vote. By convention, the person is always a Shia Muslim.

Berri won the majority of the votes cast, receiving 98 votes and 76.5% out of 128 deputies.

== See also ==
- 2018 Lebanese general election
