= Tahhan =

Tahhan or Tahan (in Arabic طحان) is a surname. It may refer to:

- Bassam Tahhan, Syrian-born French professor of Arabic literature and expert on the Quran
- Hussein al-Tahan or al-Tahhan (born 1955), the governor of Baghdad, Iraq from 2005 to 2009
- James Tahhan (born 1988), Venezuelan chef, television personality, restaurateur, and author
- Maya Tahan (born 1999), Israeli tennis player
- Mohamed Zein Tahan (or Zein Tahhan or Tahhan), (born 1990), Lebanese footballer

== See also ==
- Carolin Tahhan Fachakh, or Sister Carol, Syrian nun who cared for women and children in Damascus during the Syrian Civil War.
