= 2022 Speaker of the Lebanese Parliament election =

Election for speaker of Lebanese Parliament

← 2018	31 May 2022	Next →
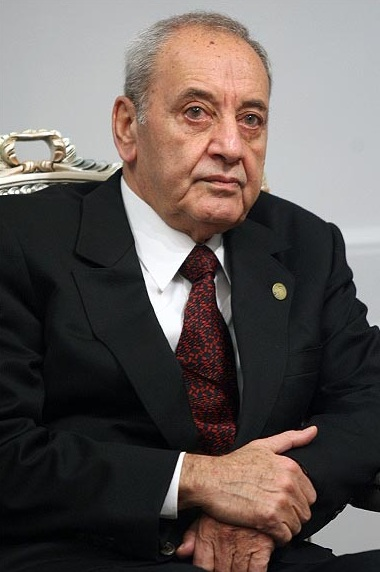
Nominee	Nabih Berri
Party	Amal Movement
Electoral vote	65
Percentage	50.78%
Speaker before election
Nabih Berri
Amal Movement
Elected Speaker
Nabih Berri
Amal Movement

The 2022 Speaker of the Lebanese Parliament election was an election to elect the speaker of the 24th Lebanese Parliament. It was 7th legislative speaker election since the implementation of the Taif Agreement in 1989.

Nabih Berri won with 65 votes out of 128, the minimum needed for a majority and the lowest outcome in his 30-year tenure as the speaker of parliament.

== Background ==
=== 2022 general election ===
The 2022 general election was held in the wake of the revolution of 17 October 2019, a series of large-scale anti-government demonstrations against the stagnation of the economy, unemployment, Lebanon's sectarian and hereditary political system, corruption, and the government's inability to provide essential services such as water, electricity and sanitation. Despite the ensuing resignation of Prime Minister Saad Hariri and his replacement by Hassan Diab, the country's economic situation continued to deteriorate.

Compounding the crisis, on 4 August 2020, several thousand tons of ammonium nitrate stored in a hangar in the Port of Beirut exploded, killing 218, injuring over 7,000, leaving 300,000 homeless, and resulting in damages estimated at nearly four billion euros.

In the elections held on 15 May 2022, Hezbollah and its allies lost their parliamentary majority. Among the Christian community, anti-Hezbollah Lebanese Forces supplanted the Free Patriotic Movement as the largest party. The main Sunni party, the Future Movement, had withdrawn from the election, resulting in more fragmented representation for the community. Pro-reform groups that had emerged from the 2019 protests secured 13 seats.

== Election process ==
=== National Pact ===
Access to the parliamentary speakership is subject to an informal agreement known as the National Pact. Agreed in 1943, the latter limits this office only to members of the Shia Islam faith.

The National Pact is based on an unwritten agreement concluded in 1943 between the Maronite Christian president Bechara El Khoury and his Sunni prime minister Riad Al Solh when Lebanon gained independence from France. The pact stipulates that the president of the Republic must be a Maronite Christian, the prime minister a Sunni Muslim and the Speaker of parliament a Shiite Muslim.

=== Round ===
First round
Candidate	Votes	%
Nabih Berri (Amal)	65	50.78
Invalid/blank votes	63	49.22
Total	128	100
Eligible voters	128	100

== Deputy speaker of the Lebanese Parliament election ==
2022 Deputy speaker of the Lebanese Parliament election
← 2018	May 31, 2022	Next →
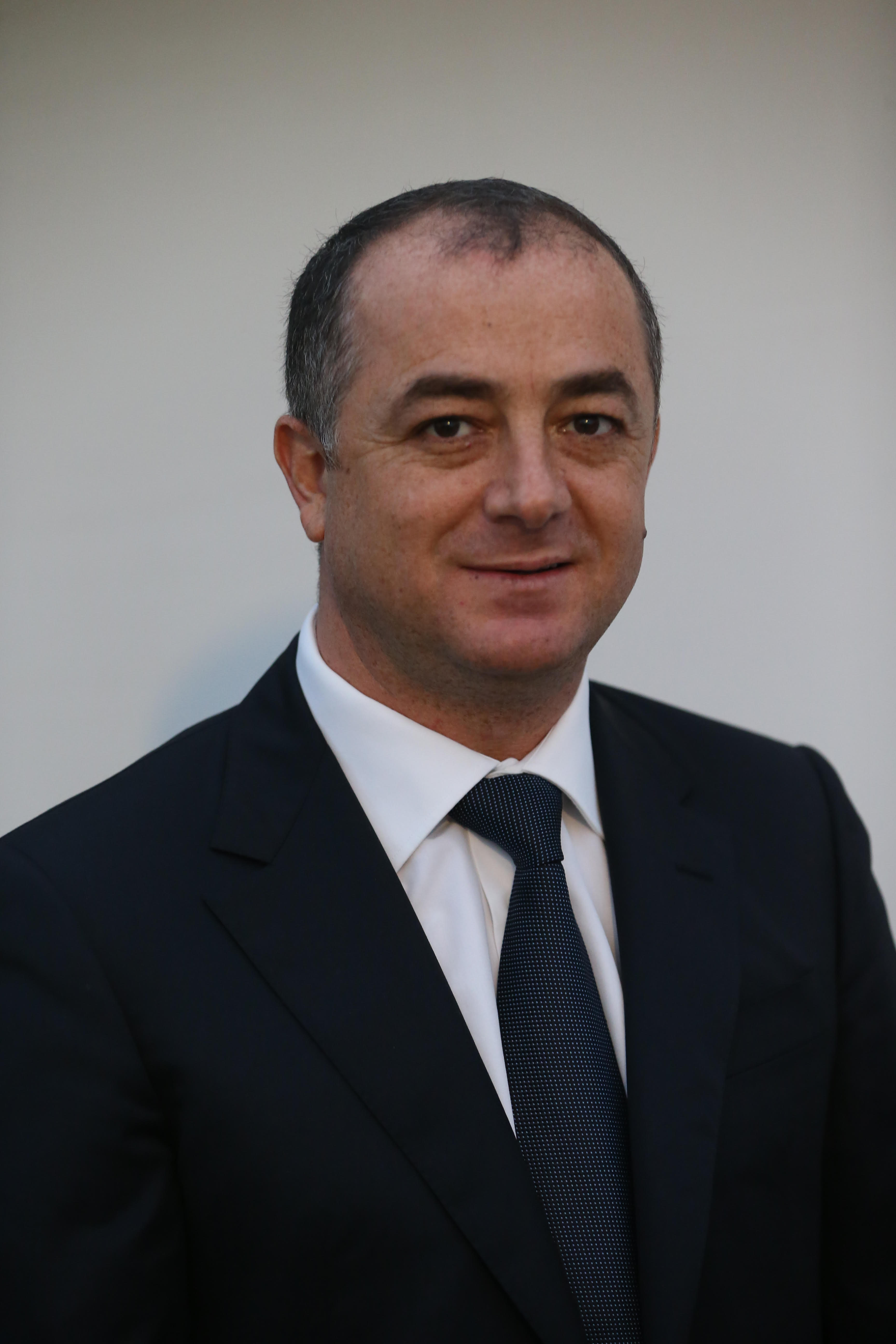
Nominee	Elias Bou Saab	Ghassan Skaff
Party	Free Patriotic Movement	PSP
Electoral vote	65	60
Percentage	50.78%	46.87%
Deputy speaker before election
Elie Ferzli
Independent
Elected Deputy speaker
Elias Bou Saab
FPM

The Deputy speaker of the parliament was elected immediately after the speaker.

Access to the deputy speakership is subject to an informal agreement known as the National Pact. Agreed in 1943, the latter limits this office only to members of the Greek Orthodoxy faith.

=== Potential candidates ===
- Ghassan Skaff - Rachaya district MP (Progressive Socialist Party)
- Ghassan Hasbani - Former deputy prime minister (Lebanese Forces)
- Elias Bou Saab - Former defense minister (Free Patriotic Movement)
- Melhem Khalaf - Former president of the Beirut Bar Association (October 17 reformist)

=== Rounds ===
In the first round, the legislators failed to elect a candidate with over 65 votes for a majority.

The second round, parliament managed to elect former defense minister, Elias Bou Saab of the Free Patriotic Movement, with 65 votes.

First round			Second Round		
Candidate	Votes	%	Candidate	Votes	%
Elias Bou Saab (FPM)	64	50	Elias Bou Saab (FPM)	65	50.78
Ghassan Skaff (PSP)	49	38.3	Ghassan Skaff (PSP)	60	46.87
Invalid/blank votes	15	11.7	Invalid/blank votes	3	2.34
Total	128	100	Total	128	100
Eligible voters	128	100	Eligible voters	128	100

== Secretaries of the Parliament election ==
2022 Secretaries of the Lebanese Parliament election
← 2018	May 31, 2022	Next →
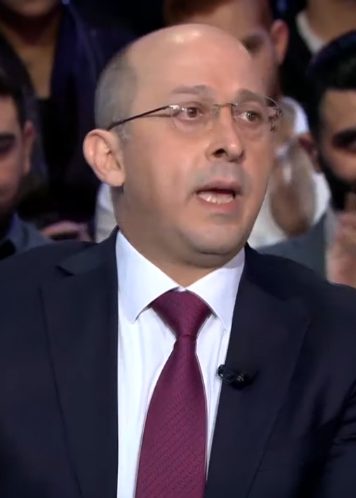

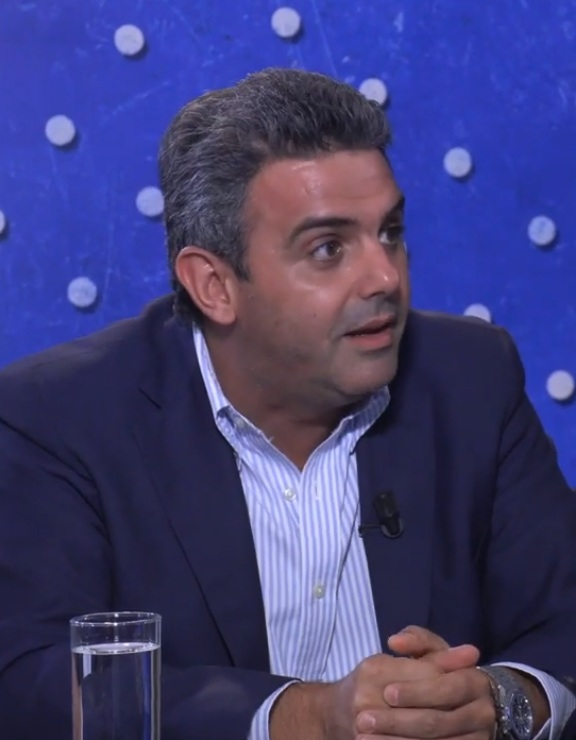
Nominee	Alain Aoun	Ziad Hawat
Party	Free Patriotic Movement	Lebanese Forces
Electoral vote	65	38
Percentage	50.78%	29.69%
Elected Secretaries
Alain Aoun, Hadi Abou Hassan
FPM, PSP

The 2 secretaries of parliament were elected immediately after the Deputy Speaker. Although not constitutionally required, it was decided that the secretaries would be attributed to one Maronite Christian and one Druze.

The election process of the 2 deputies had large debate particularly by opposition MPs. It was suggested that each MP votes for both preferences in the same ballot. However, it was decided that voting would take place on the basis of one name per ballot. As a result of this Firas Hamdan, an opposition MP, who was one of few candidates for the Druze secretary, withdrew his candidacy in protest of the sectarian electoral procedure.

=== Rounds ===
- - Elected
- - Withdrew

First round
Candidate	Sect	Votes	%
Alain Aoun (FPM)	Maronite	65	50.78
Ziad Hawat (LF)	Maronite	38	29.69
Michel Douaihy (Osos)	Maronite	4	3.12
Firas Hamdan	Druze	0	0.00
Hadi Abou Hoson (PSP)	Druze	0	0.00
Invalid/blank votes	N/A	19	14.84
Total		128	100
Eligible voters		128	100

== See also ==
- Nabih Berri
- 2022 Lebanese general election
- 2022–2025 Lebanese presidential election
