= 2000 Speaker of the Lebanese Parliament election =

← 1996	17 October 2000	2005 →

Needed to Win: Majority of votes cast 128 deputies, 65 needed for a majority
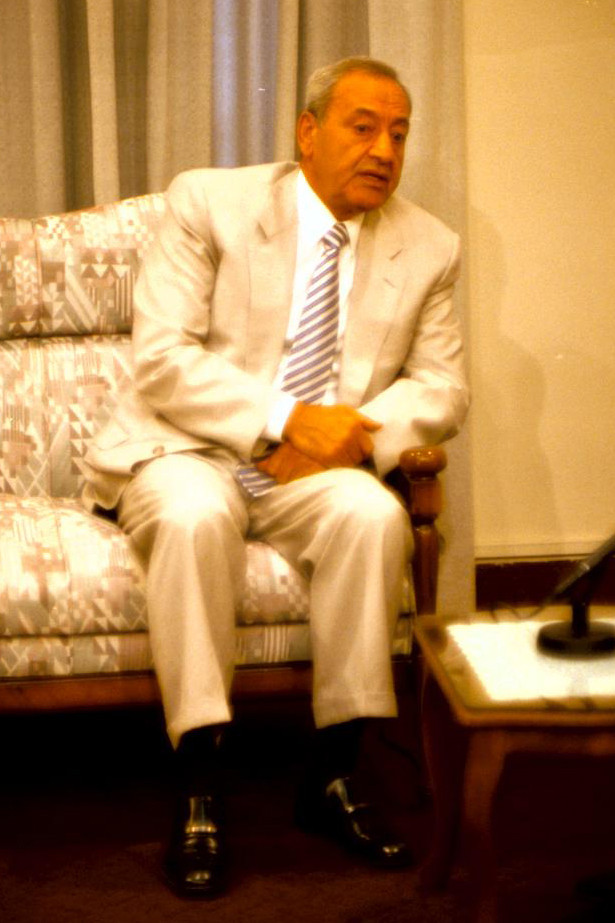
	Majority party
Candidate	Nabih Berri
Party	Amal
Leader's seat	Zahrany
Deputies' vote	124
Percentage	97%
Speaker before election
Nabih Berri
Amal
Elected Speaker
Nabih Berri
Amal

The 2000 Speaker of the Lebanese Parliament election was the 3rd legislative speaker election since the implementation of the Taif Agreement, held on 28 June 2005 during the first session of the 17th parliament. The incumbent Speaker Nabih Berri and head of the Amal Movement was re-elected to a third term.

Under the article 44 of the constitution, the speaker is elected at the start of each parliamentary cycle by an absolute majority of the deputies' vote. By convention, he is always a Shia Muslim.

Berri won the majority of the votes cast, receiving 124 votes and 97% out of 128 deputies.

== Vote ==
Election for Speaker of the 19th Parliament
Party	Candidate	Votes	%
Amal	Nabih Berri	124	97
Total votes		128	100
