= Hapi (Nile god) =

Ancient Egyptian god of the annual flooding of the Nile

- Hapi, shown as an iconographic pair of genii symbolically tying together Upper and Lower Egypt
Name in hieroglyphs
H a p y N36
- Major cult center: Elephantine
- Symbol: Lotus plant
- Consort: Meret (some accounts)

Hapi (Ancient Egyptian: ḥꜥpj) (also spelled Hapy) was the god of the annual flooding of the Nile in ancient Egyptian religion. The flood deposited rich silt on the river's banks, fertilizing the soil and enabling the Egyptians to grow crops. Hapi was greatly celebrated among the Egyptians. Some of the titles of Hapi were "Lord of the Fish and Birds of the Marshes" and "Lord of the River Bringing Vegetation". Hapi is typically depicted as an androgynous figure with a prominent belly and large drooping breasts, wearing a loincloth and ceremonial false beard.

== Mythology ==
The annual flooding of the Nile occasionally was said to be the Arrival of Hapi. Since this flooding provided fertile soil in an area that was otherwise desert, Hapi symbolised fertility. He had large female breasts because he was said to bring a rich and nourishing harvest. Due to his fertile nature he was sometimes considered the "father of the gods", and was considered to be a caring father who helped to maintain the balance of the cosmos, the world or universe regarded as an orderly, harmonious system. He was thought to live within a cavern at the supposed source of the Nile near Aswan. The cult of Hapi was mainly located at the First Cataract named Elephantine. His priests were involved in rituals to ensure the steady levels of flow required from the annual flood. At Elephantine the official nilometer, a measuring device, was carefully monitored to predict the level of the flood, and his priests must have been intimately concerned with its monitoring.

Hapi was not regarded as the god of the Nile itself but of the inundation event. He was also considered a "friend of Geb", the Egyptian god of the earth, and the "lord of Neper", the god of grain.

== Iconography ==
Hapi, bearing offerings

Although male and wearing the false beard, Hapi was pictured with pendulous breasts and a large stomach, as representations of the fertility of the Nile. He was usually given blue or green skin, representing water. Other attributes varied, depending upon the region of Egypt in which the depictions exist. In Lower Egypt, he was adorned with papyrus plants and attended by frogs, present in the region, and symbols of it. In Upper Egypt, it was the lotus and crocodiles which were more present in the Nile, thus these were the symbols of the region, and those associated with Hapi there. Hapi often was pictured carrying offerings of food or pouring water from an amphora, but also, very rarely, was depicted as a hippopotamus. During the Nineteenth Dynasty Hapi is often depicted as a pair of figures, each holding and tying together the long stem of two plants representing Upper and Lower Egypt, symbolically binding the two halves of the country around a hieroglyph meaning "union". This symbolic representation was often carved at the base of seated statues of the pharaoh. Egyptian historian Al-Maqrizi (1364–1442) claimed in his "El Khutat El Maqrizia" ("The Maqrizian Plans") that virgins were sacrificed annually as "brides of the Nile" ("Arous El Nil"). This claim was historically accepted until the 1970s, when Egyptologists such as Bassam el-Shammaa began to dispute it.

== Gallery ==
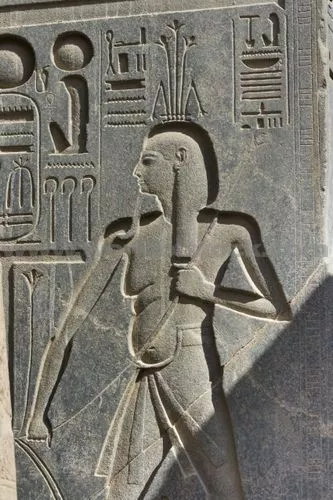
An engraving of Hapi

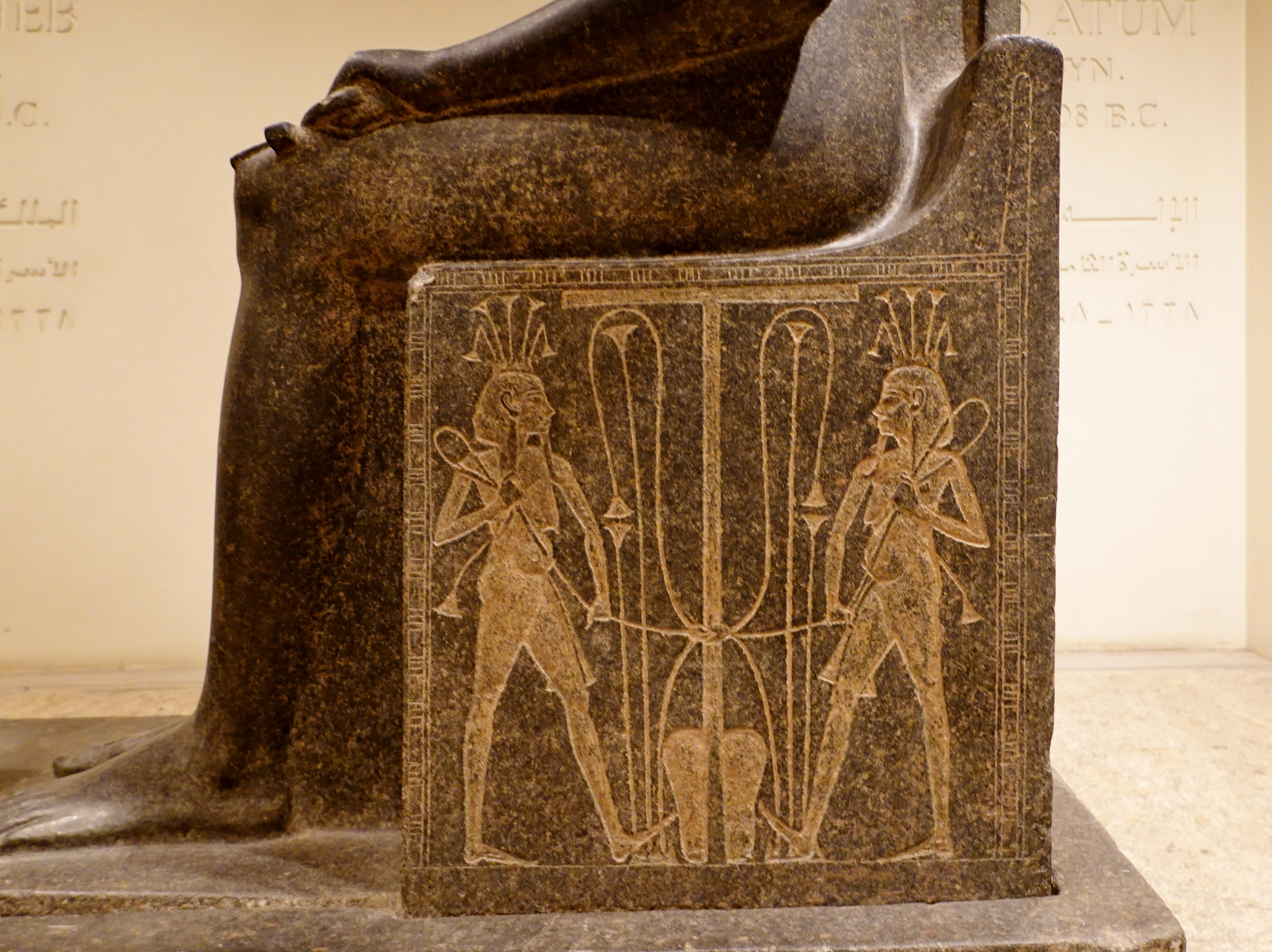
Statues of King Horemheb depicting Hapi, 18th Dynasty

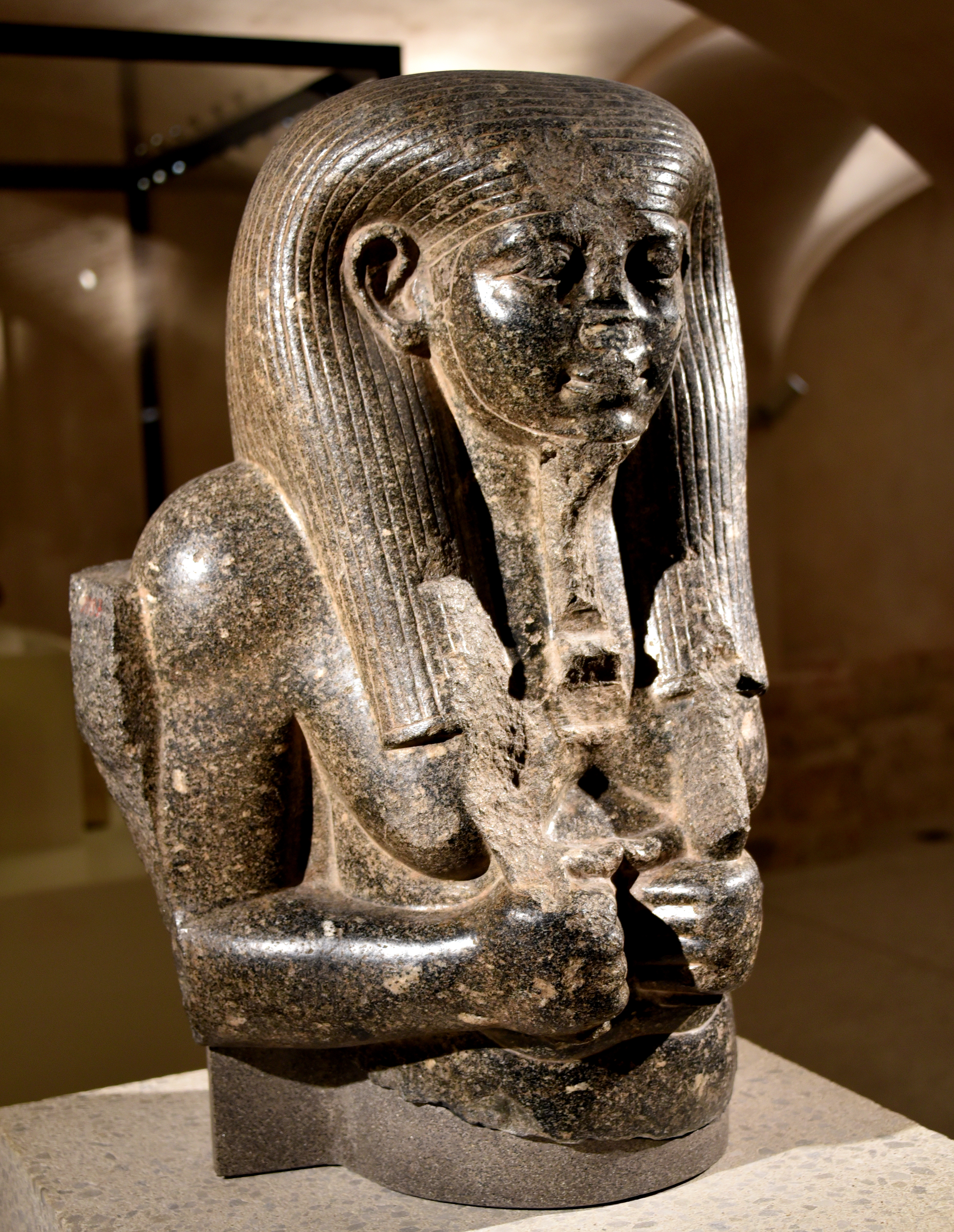
Upper part of a statue of the Nile God Hapi. From Faiyum, Egypt, 12th Dynasty, c. 1800 BCE. Neues Museum, Berlin

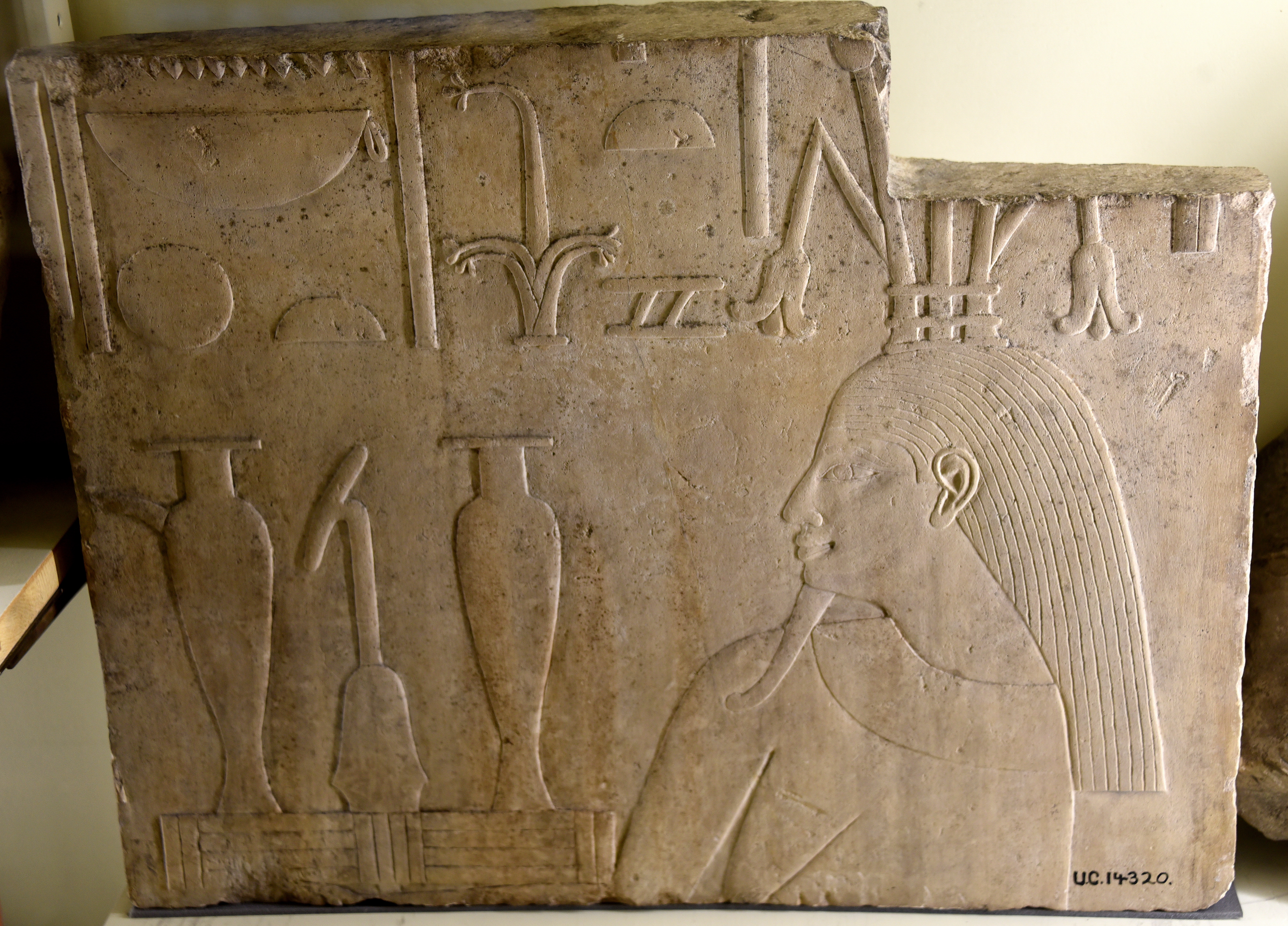
Limestone slab showing the Nile God Hapi. 12th Dynasty. From the foundations of the temple of Thutmose III at Koptos, Egypt. Petrie Museum of Egyptian Archaeology, London

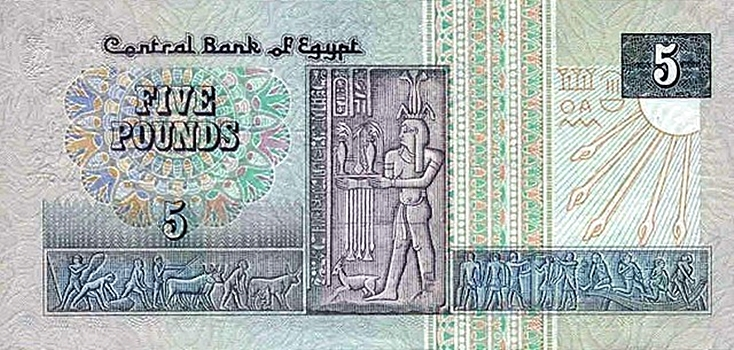
Hapi is featured on the £E5 note.
