= Basim =

Basim may refer to:

== Places ==
- Washim, an Indian city in the state of Maharashtra with Basim being an alternative name

== People ==
- Basim (singer) (Anis Basim Moujahid, born 1992), Moroccan-Danish singer
- Basim Bello (1963–2024), mayor in Iraq
- Basim Qasim (born 1959), Iraqi football manager
- Bassim Al-Karbalaei (born 1966), Shia eulogy reciter
- Basim Al-Rajaibi (born 1992), Omani footballer
- Basim Elkarra, American civil rights leader
- Basim Shami (born 1976), businessman and philanthropist

== See also ==
- Bassem, a given name
- Bassam (disambiguation)
