= Ghassan Skaff =

Lebanese politician

- غسان سكاف

Member of the Lebanese Parliament
- In office 17 May 2022 – 13 December 2025
- Constituency: Rashaya District

Personal details
- Born: Beirut, Lebanon
- Died: 13 December 2025
- Party: Independent
- Spouse: Mayssam Younes
- Children: 3
- Education: Saint Joseph University (medical school), University of Toronto (residency)
- Occupation: Politician, neurosurgeon

Ghassan Skaff (died 13 December 2025) was a Lebanese politician and neurosurgeon. He was a member of the Parliament of Lebanon from Rachaya district and was a candidate in the 2022 Deputy Speaker of the Lebanese Parliament election. Skaff is a professor and chief of neurosurgery at the American University of Beirut. He died on 13 December 2025 from cancer.

== See also ==
- List of members of the 2022-2026 Lebanese Parliament
