= History of the Ba'ath Party =

This article details the history of the Arab Socialist Ba'ath Party from its founding in 1947 to its dissolution in 1966.

== Early years: 1947–58 ==
The party was founded on 7 April 1947 as the Arab Ba'ath Party by Michel Aflaq (a Christian), Salah al-Din al-Bitar (a Sunni Muslim) and the followers of Zaki al-Arsuzi (an Alawite). The founding congress, the 1st National Congress, was held in Rasheed Coffee Shop, close to what is now the Russian Cultural Centre. While Arsuzi's followers attended the congress, he himself did not. He never forgave Aflaq and Bitar of stealing the name "Ba'ath" from him. While the party remained small during the 1940s, the party together with some recruited Ba'athist military officers participated in the March 1949 coup which toppled President Shukri al-Quwatli. When Husni al-Za'im's rule proved just as repressive as that of Quwatli, the Ba'ath participated in another coup to overthrow the former. While al-Za'im's overthrow led to the reestablishment of democracy, the 1949 elections saw the People's Party (PP) win a majority. The PP sought the establishment of an Iraqi–Syrian monarchical federal union, which Aflaq, strangely enough, supported. However, Akram al-Hourani, the leader of the Arab Socialist Party, persuaded the Ba'ath Party leadership in supporting a coup led by Adib Shishakli.

While Shishakli was dismissed at the beginning as being a follower of Hawrani, who was appointed Minister of Defense, but in 1952 Shishakli dismissed parliament and initiated a crackdown of the opposition. Aflaq, Bitar and Hawrani, after a short-lived government detention, left Syria for Lebanon. The most significant outcome of this was the merger of Hawrani's Arab Socialist Party with the Arab Ba'ath Party to form the Arab Socialist Ba'ath Party. The merger had been discussed before Shishakli's crackdown of the opposition, but Aflaq had been reluctant. With the general amnesty of October 1953, the Ba'ath leaders returned. Hawrani, after his returned, immediately began planning a coup against Shishakli. In collaboration with the PP and the National Party (NP), and through his contacts in the military, Shishakli was forced to step down in February 1954. The Ba'ath Party became the major beneficiary of Shishakli's downfall, and in the 1954 elections, 90 percent of the Ba'ath Party members who stood for elections were elected to parliament, and it became the third largest party in the country.

The 2nd National Congress convened in June 1954 elected a seven-man National Command (replacing the old Executive Committee), the party's highest organ between National Congresses. Aflaq, Bitar and Hawrani represented the Syrian Regional Branch while Abdullah Rimawi and Abdallah Na'was represented the Jordanian Regional Branch. The modern Ba'ath Party structure was created at the 2nd National Congress by amending the party's Internal Regulations. The Congress officially approved the merger of 1952 of the Arab Ba'ath and the Arab Socialist Party.

The failure of the traditionalist parties (the PP and the NP) to close ranks, strengthened the public image of the Ba'ath Party. When Ba'athist Adnan al-Malki, the deputy chief of staff, was assassinated by Yunis Abd al-Rahim, a member of the Syrian Social Nationalist Party (SSNP), the Ba'ath Party launched a vehemently anti-SSNP hate-campaigns which "reached hysterical proportions". What followed organized anti-SSNP demonstrations, attacks on the SSNP's party organ al-Bina, the sentencing of its party leaders to jail, and the SSNP's dissolution. After this, the traditionalist parties with the Ba'ath Party and the Syrian Communist Party, signed a National Pact which sough the establishment of a unity government. After bickering with the traditionalist parties of the PP and the NP, a unity government was formed led by Sabri al-Asali. Bitar and Khalil Kallas were appointed Minister of Foreign Affairs and Minister of Economics respectively in the new government. The Ba'ath Party, in a position of strength, was then able to force the government to join a proposed federal union with Egypt. This would lead to the establishment of the United Arab Republic (UAR) and the dissolution of the Syrian Regional Branch.

== United Arab Republic period: 1958–61 ==
On 24 June 1959, Fuad al-Rikabi, the 1st Regional Secretary of the Iraqi Regional Branch, called a press conference in Beirut, Lebanon in which he condemned the National Command, accusing them of not living up their official pan-Arab principles. According to Rikabi he spoke on the behalf of the Iraqi Regional Command. He further accused them of conspiring against the UAR. The National Command, Rikabi said, had taken over the Iraqi Regional Branch organization by illegal means, and had established a puppet Regional Command. This was confirmed by the National Command, which responded to criticism by stating that Rikabi had left his post as Regional Secretary on 29 November 1959, and that he was unqualified to speak on the party's behalf.

The 3rd National Congress, held 27 August – 1 September 1959, was attended by delegates from "Iraq, Lebanon, Jordan, South Arabia, the Gulf, Arab South, Arab Maghreb, Palestine and Party student organisations in Arab and other universities outside the [Arab] homeland". The congress endorsed the dissolution of the Syrian Regional Branch, which had been decided by Aflaq and Bitar in 1958.

The National Command expelled Rimawi from the Ba'ath Party in September 1959, because if his opportunism and his failure to appear in a National Command meeting which was investigation him on charges of financial irregularities. On 6 September 1959 Rimawi and Gharbiyah issued a resolution which declared the National Command resolution null and void, and denied the allegations which had been leveled against Rimawi. In May 1960, Rimawi had established a rival National Command, an organ which would develop into the Arab Socialist Revolutionary Ba'ath Party (ASBP), a pro-UAR party. The Revolutionary Ba'ath Party stopped its activity in either 1962 or 1963. By 1966, the Regional Branch had 1,000 members.

On 2 February 1960 the National Command, in the presence of Rikabi, elected a Temporary Regional Command with Talib Hussein ash-Shabibi as Regional Secretary. Not long after, in July 1960, the 3rd Regional Congress of the Iraqi Regional Branch called on the national leadership to investigate Rikabi. The National Command investigated him in 1960, and expelled him from the party on 15 June 1961. Rikabi was later reported to be a member of the ASBP, and Radio Cairo continued to refer to him as the Regional Secretary of the Iraqi Regional Branch.

The 4th National Congress, held in August 1960, reversed the decision reached at the 3rd National Congress, which supported the dissolution of the Syrian Regional Branch. It was mainly attended by representatives from the Lebanese Regional Branch. The congress had a strongly anti-Nasserite tendency, and the traditional leadership of Aflaq and Bitar was criticized. The delegates decided to deemphasize pan-Arabism for Marxian interpretation of socialism, and criticized the traditional leadership for entering Syria into the UAR. Discontent with Egyptian dominance of the UAR, led elements opposed to the union under Abdul Karim al-Nahlawi, to seize power on 28 September 1961. Two days later, the Syrian Arab Republic was reestablished.

== Ba'ath rule and the 1966 split: 1961–66 ==
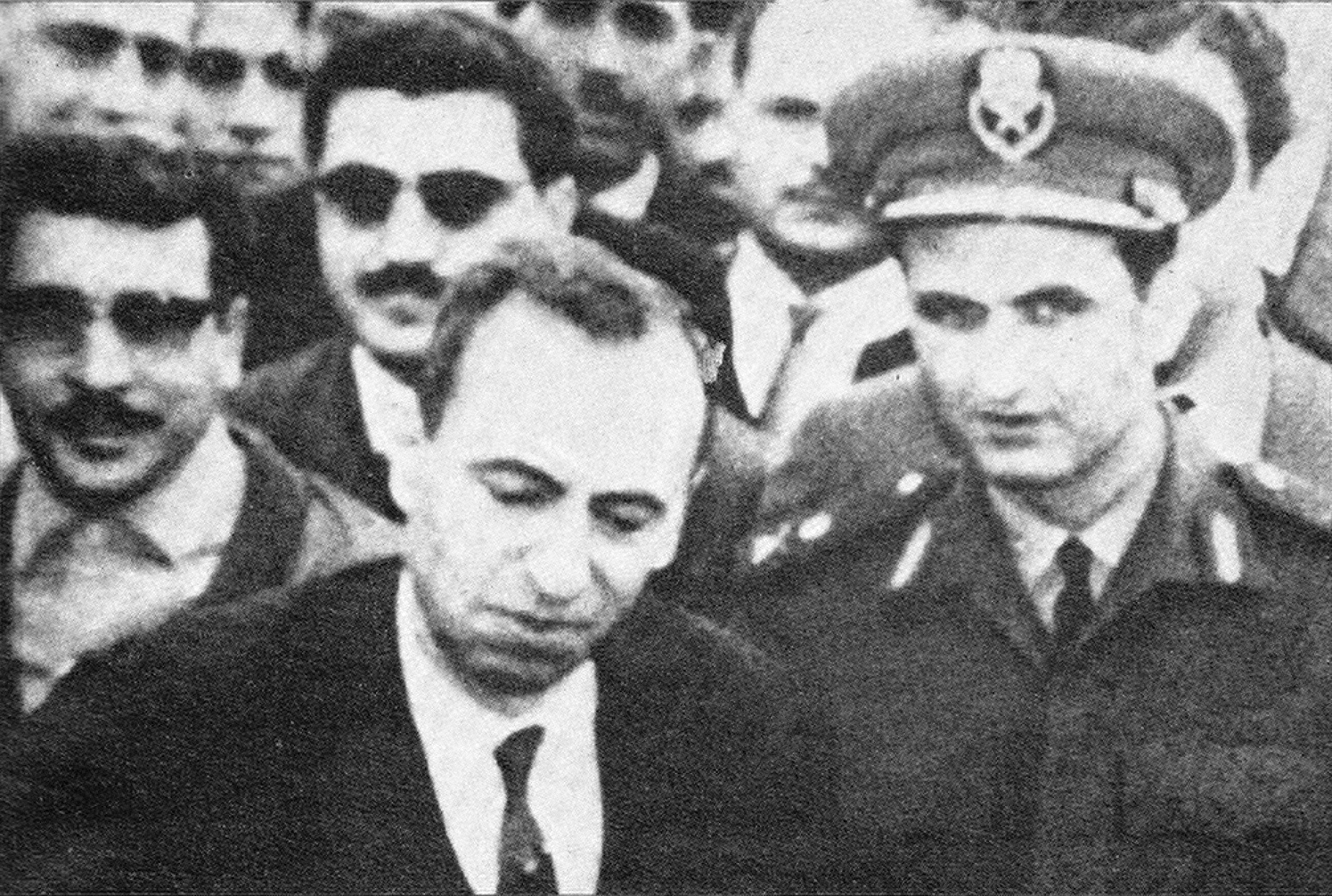
Michel Aflaq (left) and Salah Jadid (right), shortly after taking power in 1963

The challenges of building a Ba'athist state led to considerable ideological discussion and internal struggle within the party. The Iraqi Regional Branch was increasingly dominated by Ali Salih al-Sadi, now a self-described Marxist, previously anti-communist as of the summer of 1963. He was supported in his ideological reorientation by Hammud al-Shufi, the Regional Secretary of the Syrian Regional Command, Yasin al-Hafiz, one of the party's few ideological theorists, and by certain members of the secret Military Committee.

The far-left tendency gained control at the party's 6th National Congress of 1963, where hardliners from the dominant Syrian and Iraqi regional parties joined forces to impose a hard left line, calling for "socialist planning", "collective farms run by peasants", "workers' democratic control of the means of production", a party based on workers and peasants, and other demands reflecting a certain emulation of Soviet-style socialism. In a coded attack on Michel Aflaq, the congress also condemned "ideological notability", criticizing his middle-class background, within the party. Aflaq, angry at this transformation of his party, retained a nominal leadership role, but the National Command as a whole came under the control of the radicals.

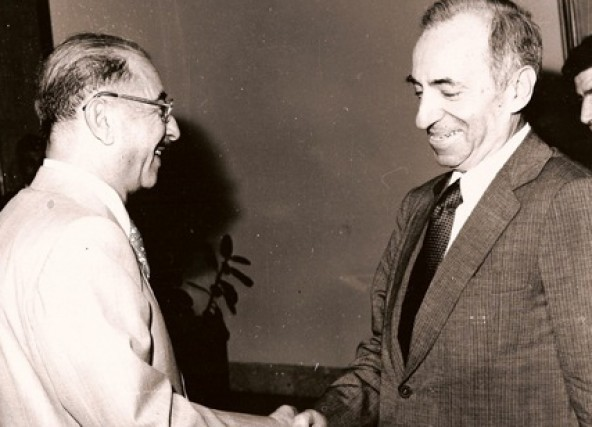
Ahmed Hassan al-Bakr (left), the Regional Secretary of the Iraqi Regional Branch, shaking hands with Michel Aflaq in 1968.

In 1963 the Ba'ath Party seized power, from then on the Ba'ath functioned as the only officially recognized Syrian political party, but factionalism and splintering within the party led to a succession of governments and new constitutions. On 23 February 1966, a bloody coup d'état led by a more left-wing, radical Ba'athist faction headed by Chief of Staff Salah Jadid, overthrew Aflaq and the Salah al-Din al-Bitar's Government. The coup sprung out of factional rivalry between Jadid's "regionalist" (qutri) camp of the Ba'ath Party, which promoted ambitions for a Greater Syria and the more traditionally pan-Arab, in power faction, called the "nationalist" (qawmi) faction.

Jadid's supporters were seen as more radically left-wing then Aflaq and his peers. Many of Jadid's opponents managed to make their escape and fled to Beirut, Lebanon. Jadid moved the party in a more radical direction, although he and his supporters had not been supporters of the victorious far-left line at the Sixth Party Congress, they had now moved to adopt its positions. The moderate faction, formerly led by Aflaq and al-Bitar, were purged from the party.

In the aftermath of the 1966 coup, the Ba'ath Party split in two; out of it a Damascus-based Ba'ath Party and a Baghdad-based Ba'ath Party were formed, with each maintaining that it was the genuine party and electing a separate National Command to take charge of the international Ba'ath movement. However, both in Iraq and Syria, the Regional Command became the real centre of party power, and the membership of the National Command became a largely honorary position, often the destination of figures being eased out of the leadership. A consequence of the split was that Zaki al-Arsuzi took Aflaq's place as the official father of ba'athist thought in the Damascus-based Ba'ath Party, while the Baghdad-based Ba'ath Party still considered Aflaq the de jure father of Ba'athist thought.

== See also ==
- History of the Arab Socialist Ba'ath Party – Syria Region

== Bibliography ==
Articles & journals

- Ben-Tzur, Avraham (July 1968). "The Neo-Ba'th Party of Syria". Journal of Contemporary History. 3 (3). SAGE Publications: 161–181. doi:10.1177/002200946800300310. JSTOR 259704. S2CID 159345006.
- Kaylani, Nabil (January 1972). "The Rise of the Syrian Ba'th, 1940–1958: Political Success, Party Failure". International Journal of Middle East Studies. 3 (1). Cambridge University Press: 3–23. doi:10.1017/s0020743800030014. JSTOR 162353. S2CID 154642979.

Bibliography

- Ali, Tariq (2004). Bush in Babylon: The Recolonisation of Iraq. Verso. ISBN 978-1-84467-512-8.
- Anderson, Betty Signe (2005). Nationalist Voices in Jordan: The Street and the State. University of Texas Press. ISBN 978-0-292-70625-5.
- Batatu, Hanna (1999). Syria's Peasantry, the Descendants of Its Lesser Rural Notables, and Their Politics. Princeton University Press. ISBN 9780691002545.
- Bengio, Ofra (1998). Saddam's Word: Political Discourse in Iraq. Oxford University Press. ISBN 978-0-19-511439-3.
- Choueiri, Youssef (2000). Arab Nationalism: A History: Nation and State in the Arab World. Wiley-Blackwell. ISBN 978-0-631-21729-9.
- Claessen, Erik (2010). Stalemate: An Anatomy of Conflicts between Democracies, Islamists, and Muslim Autocrats: An Anatomy of Conflicts between Democracies, Islamists, and Muslim Autocrats. ABC-CLIO. ISBN 9780313384455.
- Commins, Dean (2004). Historical Dictionary of Syria. Scarecrow Press. ISBN 978-0-8108-4934-1.
- Coughlin, Con (2005). Saddam: His Rise and Fall. Harper Perennial. ISBN 978-0-06-050543-1.
- Dawisha, Addid (2005). Arab nationalism in the Twentieth Century: From Triumph to Despair. Princeton University Press. ISBN 978-0-691-12272-4.
- DeFronzo, James (2009). The Iraq War: Origins and Consequences. Westview Press. ISBN 978-0-8133-4391-4.
- Devlin, John (1975). The Baath Party: a History from its Origins to 1966 (2nd ed.). Hoover Institute Press. ISBN 978-0-8179-6561-7.
- Federal Research Division (2004). Syria: A Country Study. Kessinger Publishing. ISBN 978-1-4191-5022-7.
- George, Alan (2003). Syria: Neither Bread nor Freedom. Zed Books. ISBN 978-1-84277-213-3.
- Ghareeb, Edmund A.; Dougherty, Beth K. (2004). Historical Dictionary of Iraq. The Scarecrow Press, Ltd. ISBN 978-0-8108-4330-1.
- Finer, Samuel; Stanley, Jay (2009). The Man on Horseback: The Role of the Military in Politics. Transaction Publishers. ISBN 978-0-7658-0922-3.
- Goldman, Ralph Morris (2002). The Future Catches Up: Transnational Parties and Democracy. iUniverse. ISBN 978-0-595-22888-1.
- Hiro, Dilip (1982). Inside the Middle East. Routledge & Kegan Paul. ISBN 978-0-7100-9039-3.
- Jones, Jeremy (2007). Negotiating Change: The New Politics of the Middle East. I.B. Tauris. ISBN 978-1-84511-269-1.
- Karsh, Afraim; Rautsi, Inari (1991). Saddam Hussein: A Political Biography. Grove Press. ISBN 978-0788151101.
- Kostiner, Joseph (2007). Conflict and Cooperation in the Gulf Region. VS Verlag. ISBN 978-3-531-16205-8.
- Mufti, Malik (1996). Sovereign creations: pan-Arabism and Political order in Syria and Iraq. Cornell University Press. ISBN 978-0-06-050543-1.
- Moaddel, Mansoor (2010). Islamic Modernism, Nationalism, and Fundamentalism: Episode and Discourse. University of Chicago Press. ISBN 9780226533339.
- Ministry of Information (1971). The Socialist Arab Ba'ath: a Profound Belief. Government of the Syrian Arab Republic. Ministry of Information.
- Nakash, Yitzhak (2003). The Shi'is of Iraq. Princeton University Press. ISBN 978-0-691-11575-7.
- Oron, Yitzhak (1960). Middle East Record. Vol. 1. George Weidenfeld & Nicolson Limited. ASIN B0028IN0X6.
- Peretz, Don (1994). The Middle East Today. Greenwood Publishing Group. ISBN 978-0-275-94576-3.
- Podeh, Elie (1999). The Decline of Arab Unity: The Rise and Fall of the United Arabic Republic. Sussex Academic Press. ISBN 978-1-902210-20-9.
- Polk, William Roe (2006). Understanding Iraq: A Whistlestop Tour from Ancient Babylon to Occupied Baghdad. I.B. Tauris. ISBN 978-1-84511-123-6.
- Rabinovich, Itamar (1972). Syria Under the Baʻth, 1963–66: The Army Party Symbiosis. Transaction Publishers. ISBN 978-0-7065-1266-3.
- Reich, Bernard (1990). Political Leaders of the Contemporary Middle East and North Africa: A Biographical Dictionary. Greenwood Publishing Group. ISBN 978-0313262135.
- Salem, Paul (1994). Bitter Legacy: Ideology and Politics in the Arab World. Syracuse University Press. ISBN 978-0-8156-2628-2.
- Seale, Patrick (1990). Asad of Syria: The Struggle for the Middle East. University of California Press. ISBN 978-0-520-06976-3.
- Seddon, David (2004). A Political and Economic Dictionary of the Middle East. Taylor & Francis. ISBN 978-1-85743-212-1.
- Sheffer, Gabriel; Ma'oz, Moshe (2002). Middle Eastern Minorities and Diasporas. Sussex Academic Press. ISBN 978-1-902210-84-1.
- Simmons, Geoffrey Leslie (1993). Libya: The Struggle for Survival. Palgrave Macmillan. ISBN 978-0-312-08997-9.
- Tejei, Jordi (2009). Syria's Kurds: History, Politics and Society. Routledge. ISBN 978-1-134-09643-5.
- Wright, John (1981). Libya: A Modern History. Taylor & Francis. ISBN 978-0-7099-2727-3.
