= Meret =

Ancient Egyptian deity

- Meret wearing a bundle of lotus
Name in hieroglyphs
U7 r X1 H8 HA B1
- Symbol: Blue lotus Papyrus reed

Genealogy
- Spouse: Hapi

In Egyptian mythology, Meret (also spelled Mert) was a goddess who was strongly associated with rejoicing, such as singing and dancing.

== In myth ==
Meret was a token wife occasionally given to Hapi, the god of the Nile flood. Her name being a reference to this, meaning simply the beloved. As token wife, she was usually depicted with the same associations as Hapi, having on her head either the blue lotus for Upper Egypt, or the papyrus plant for Lower Egypt. Since Hapi was the source of bountifulness, Meret was usually depicted with an offering bowl, as she was seen, being his wife, as the symbolic recipient of his generosity.

Among the lower classes, where nationalism was less important than successful harvest, she was more strongly considered the wife of Hapi than the protectresses of Lower and Upper Egypt, which were more normally his wife in the upper classes. As a deity whose role was to be the symbolic receiver of bounty from the inundation of the Nile, she was strongly associated with rejoicing, such as singing and dancing. Later stories tell that Meret was the goddess of the eighth hour, in the Book of Gates.
