= Bassem Sabeh =

Lebanese journalist and politician (born 1951)

Minister of Information
- In office November 1996 – December 1998
- Prime Minister: Rafic Hariri

Personal details
- Born: Bassem Ahmed Sabeh; 1 January 1951 (age 75) Bourj el-Barajneh, Beirut, Lebanon
- Education: Lebanese University
- Occupation: Journalist

Bassem Sabeh (born 1 January 1951) is a Lebanese journalist and politician. He served at the Parliament of Lebanon and was the editor-in-chief of As Safir daily between 1980 and 1990.

== Early life and education ==
Sabeh was born in Bourj el-Barajneh on 1 January 1951. He hailed from a Shia family. He received a degree in journalism from the Lebanese University in Beirut in 1972.

== Career ==
Following his graduation Sabeh worked for different newspapers and became a member of the Press Syndicate in 1979. He was its secretary from 1979 to 1996. He was named as the editor-in-chief of As Safir in 1980 and served in the post until 1990. He was appointed deputy-secretary of the Arab Journalists Federation in 1983, and his term ended in 1996.

Sabeh was elected as a deputy from Baabda in 1992 and won his seat again in 1996. He was appointed minister of information in November 1996 which he held until December 1998. Sabeh was elected as a member of the Parliament on the list of the Future Movement in the 2005 elections. The same year he was a candidate for the Speaker of the Parliament. However, Nabih Berri won the election. Sabeh also ran for a seat from Baabda in the 2009 elections, but he was not elected.

=== Views ===
Sabeh is one of the critics of the Shia political party Hezbollah. He was close to Rafic Hariri.
