= Tahan =

Tahan is a surname. Notable people with the surname include:

- Charles Tahan, American physicist
- Charlie Tahan (born 1998), American actor
- Daisy Tahan (born 2001), American actress
- Hussein Tahan (born 1982), Lebanese footballer
- Maya Tahan (born 1999), Israeli tennis player
- Mohamad Zein Tahan (born 1988) Lebanese footballer

== See also ==
- Tahhan
