= Mohamed Abou Zeid =

Egyptian technician and politician

Minister of Supply and Internal Trade
- In office 2 August 2012 – 5 January 2013
- Prime Minister: Hisham Qandil
- Preceded by: Gouda Abdel Khaleq
- Succeeded by: Bassem Ouda

Personal details
- Party: Independent

Mohamed Abou Zeid is an Egyptian public sector technocrat and former minister of supply and internal trade in the Qandil cabinet who was in office from August 2012 to January 2013.

== Career ==
Zeid was vice president of Egypt's Food Industries Holding Company, a state-owned enterprise. He was appointed minister of supply for internal trade on 2 August 2012, replacing Gouda Abdel Khaleq in the post. However, his term ended on 5 January 2013 when a cabinet reshuffle took place. Zeid was replaced by Bassem Ouda as minister.
