= Bassam Lotfi =

Syrian actor (1940–2022)

- بسام لطفي
- Born: Bassam Lotfi Suliman Abu Ghazaleh; 1 January 1940; Tulkarm
- Died: 19 August 2022 (aged 82); Damascus
- Occupation: Actor

Bassam Lotfi (Arabic: بسام لطفي) (1 January 1940 – 19 August 2022) was a Syrian actor, who was born and raised in Tulkarm in Palestine. He is considered one of the most prominent Arab actors, and he is considered one of the first generation of Syrian actors. He played a role in the launch of Syrian drama and he participated in dozens of series that gained wide popularity in Arabic. He was known as the “Dean of Syrian Drama”.

== Biography ==
Bassam Lotfi was born in Tulkarm on 1 January 1940 during a period of the Mandatory Palestine, he received his primary education in Tulkarm. His father was a teacher in Tulkarm.

Bassam Lotfi moved to Syria after the 1948 war. He returned to Tulkarm for a time in 1967, but the return lasted only a few months as he left for Syria again after Israel took control of the West Bank in June 1967.

== Artistic career ==
Bassam Lotfi began acting in the theatres of Damascus in 1957. He contributed to the establishment of a group of Syrian art institutions, such as the Syrian Artists Syndicate, the Arab Youth Club, the Syrian National Theatre, the Syrian Military Theatre, and the Palestinian National Theatre.

== Honors and awards ==
- Honored on the World Theatre Day in Damascus, 2008.
- The Syrian Ministry of Information honored him as one of the most prominent pioneers of Syrian drama, 2019.
- The Youth Cinema Festival in Damascus honored him for his long artistic career, 2019.

== Death ==
Bassam Lotfi died at the age of 82, on 19 August 2022 in Damascus, and the Palestinian President Mahmoud Abbas mourned him.
