= Bassem Breish =

Lebanese film director and writer

Bassem Breish (Arabic: باسم بريش, also spelled Bassem Breiche) is a Lebanese film director and writer, who was recently notable for being a member of the team which made Shankaboot, a Lebanese series available through the internet which has been described as "the world's first Arabic web drama". For this, Shankaboot's creators won the 2011 International Digital Emmy, with Mr Breish, one of the script writers, appearing on the stage to receive the award.

Prior to working for Shankaboot in Beirut, Lebanon, Breish had been an actor and director for a made-for-TV film as well as making his student film, both while a student in the UK.

== Awards ==
Breish is the recipient of the Robert Bosch Stiftung Prize for fiction films for the year 2013. The 2013 film competition was dedicated to cooperation between Germany and the Arab World, with many of the participants coming from Lebanon.
