= Bassam Izzuddin =

English professor of civil engineering

Prof. Bassam Afif Izzuddin
- Education: American University of Beirut (BEng); Imperial College London (MSc), (PhD)
- Scientific career
- Fields: Computational mechanics
- Workplaces: Imperial College London, UK

Bassam Izzuddin is an author, developer and professor of computational structural mechanics at the Department of Civil and Environmental Engineering at the Imperial College London where he is coordinator of three courses at advanced undergraduate and masters level. He is the founder and developer of ADAPTIC, an adaptive static and dynamic structural analysis program which has been developed to provide an efficient tool for the nonlinear analysis of steel and composite frames, slabs, shells and integrated structures. In 2016, he won the IStructE award for the best research paper in structural mechanics.
