= Bassem Ouda =

Egyptian politician (born 1970)

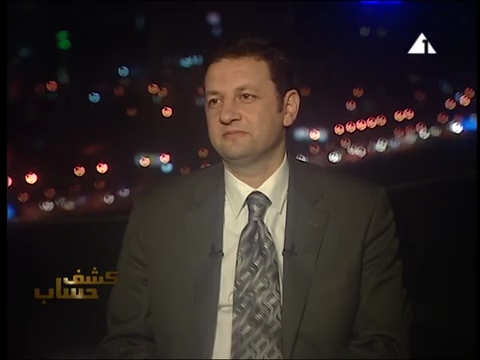
- Bassem Ouda in 2013

Minister of Supply and Internal Trade
- In office 5 January 2013 – 4 July 2013
- Prime Minister: Hesham Qandil
- Preceded by: Zeid Mohamed
- Succeeded by: Muhamed Abu Shadi

Personal details
- Born: 16 March 1970 (age 56)
- Party: Muslim Brotherhood: Freedom and Justice Party
- Education: Cairo University

Bassem Kamal Mohamed Ouda (Arabic: باسم كمال محمد عودة, born 16 April 1970), commonly known as Bassem Ouda, is an Egyptian politician who is a member of the Muslim Brotherhood and the Freedom and Justice Party (FJP). He served as Egypt's Minister of Supply and Interior Trade between January and July 2013, when he resigned due to the 2013 Egyptian coup d'état. He was later arrested, tried and sentenced to life imprisonment in a politically motivated trial.

== Early life ==
Bassem Kamal Mohamed Ouda was born in Algeria in 1970.

== Career ==
Ouda was one of the candidates for the secretariat of the FJP in 2011. He was the head of the fuel file in President Mohamed Morsi's 100-day plan during the latter's presidential champaign. He also heads the energy committee of the FJP.

Ouda was appointed Minister of Supply and Interior Trade on 5 January 2013 in a government reshuffle. Ouda replaced Zeid Mohamed in the post. Ouda was one of the FJP members serving in the cabinet that is headed by Prime Minister Hesham Qandil. He and other FJP members in the cabinet resigned from office on 4 July 2013 following the 2013 coup d'état in Egypt. Ouda's term officially ended on 16 July 2013 when the interim government led by Hazem Al Beblawi was formed.

== Post-coup arrest and trial ==
On 12 November 2013, Egyptian security forces arrested Ouda on accusation of incitement of violence.

=== First case ===
On 19 July 2014, an initial death sentence ruling was made against a number of previous members and leaders of the Muslim Brotherhood in a case known as "Masjid Al-Istqama incident". However the Grand Mufti of Egypt refused to certify the ruling, hence the case was sent back to court.

On 10 January 2019, the Giza criminal court found Ouda, and 6 other individuals, not guilty in the "Masjid Al-Istiqama Incident" case during the final ruling.

=== Second case ===
A second case was brought against Ouda alongside 45 others, including the then Supreme Guide of the Muslim Brotherhood Mohammed Badie, for participating in protests in Rabaa square. On 8 October 2018, Ouda was found guilty by the Giza criminal court and was sentenced to life imprisonment along with 31 others, 12 were sentenced to death, including Badie, and only 3 were found not guilty by the court.

On 14 June 2021, the Court of Cassation upheld the decision against all 43 individuals including Bassem Ouda.
