= Rehab Bassam =

Egyptian writer

- Born: May 10, 1977
- Occupations: Short story writer, blogger, editor and translator

Rehab Bassam (Arabic: رحاب بسام), is an Egyptian blogger who rose to fame in 2008 when Dar al Shorouk, one of the most prominent Egyptian publishing houses, published a collection of her blog posts in book form. She is an active blogger since November 2004.

== Biography ==
A graduate of Faculty of Arts (Kolleyyat al Aadaab) with a major in English, Rehab started to blog back in 2004, making it "as a challenge", in her own words, when a friend of hers teased her online for not having a blog. Having a look at his, she realized that a blog is where an individual writes about his or her daily routine, and she said to herself "It's no big deal, I too can do that". That very day she created a blog.

As an Anglophone, Bassam's early posts were in English, but simultaneously and "overnight", she found herself writing in Arabic by September 2004.

Bassam had a career in market research, copywriting, editing, and translation and publishing of children books.

== Blog ==
In 2004, Bassam came into the Egyptian blogosphere, a then-nascent community, through her blog Hawadeet (Egyptian colloquialism for "tales"), writing under the nickname Hadouta (Egyptian colloquialism for "a tale"), which soon gained a growing popularity. Her blog writing, stories as well as dairy, are described by local reviewers as "gripping, funny, full of echoes from a wide range of influences", "spontaneous", exhibiting "high literary powers", written "in a fine style", "well-written", "expressive", and "marvelous".

== Works ==
- Rice Pudding for Two (2008) أرز باللبن لشخصين
