= Bassam Yammine =

Lebanese businessman

- Born: Bassam Yammine; 1968 (age 57–58)
- Education: Loyola Marymount University; The University of Chicago
- Occupation: Economist
- Years active: 1994–present
- Spouse: Ghida El Osman Yammine
- Children: 3
- Website: www.excelsaholding.com/en/

Bassam Yammine (Arabic: بسام يمين; born 1968) is a Lebanese economist and former CEO of Credit Suisse Saudi Arabia.

== Early life and education ==
Yammine was born into a Maronite family. He obtained bachelor of arts and master's degrees from Loyola Marymount University. Then he received an MBA degree in finance from the University of Chicago in 1994.

== Career ==
Yammine began his career as deputy chairman of Li Venture Sal, the first venture capital firm in Lebanon, from 1995 to 2004. He later served as an advisor at the ministry of health from 1997 to 2000 in Lebanon. He was appointed minister of industry to the cabinet led by then prime minister Najib Mikati in 2005. Next, Yammine founded Audi Saudi Arabia, one of the largest banking groups in Lebanon.

In September 2007, Yammine began to work at Credit Suisse as a managing director and co-chief executive officer of the Middle East and also, the head of the Investment Banking and Asset Management businesses in the Middle East and North Africa (MENA) region. He became the CEO of Credit Suisse Saudi Arabia in 2008. In 2011, he was appointed one of the two co-heads for Credit Suisse's investment banking operations in the Middle East and North Africa (MENA). In October 2012, Yammine resigned from the Credit Suisse and left the bank in December 2012. During his term at the Credit Suisse, he was one of the key figures.

Since 2013, Yammine has started his own business, Excelsa, with offices in Lebanon, Algeria, and the United States.
