= Basim Shami =

Palestinian-American businessman (born 1986)

- Born: October 7, 1986 (age 40); Houston, Texas, U.S.
- Occupation: Businessman
- Known for: CEO, Beauty Elite Group

Basim Shami (born October 7, 1986) is an American businessman. He started his career at Farouk Systems, a Houston-based haircare products company he founded.

== Early life and education ==
Basim Shami was born on October 7, 1986, in Houston, Texas. Basim attended the Houston Baptist University from which he earned his Bachelor of Science, a degree in marketing, as well as a Master's degree in Human Resource Management.

== Career ==
While he was studying, Basim worked at Farouk Systems. After graduation he took more important roles in the company, and was responsible for marketing, logistics, and product development, and by 1995 he founded his own venture, Beauty Elite Group, which he has been its CEO since then. It had acquired some local companies such as BlowPro, Scruples, CAJ Beauty, Fuel Haircare and Pet Silk. Basim's involvement in Farouk Systems has been always active, as he has taken more roles until eventually becoming the company's CEO, and has been among the company's top executives, along with his father, Farouk, and his brother Rami. He has helped the company to launch new products and expanding its scale.

Basim Shami has been seen on Celebrity Apprentice, Univision, NBC and CNN as well as Miss Universe competition. He also served as a judge for the 2010 Miss Universe Pageant. He also has been involved in philanthropic activities.

He was selected as a finalist for the 2013 Ernst & Young Entrepreneur of the Year.
