= Nabih Berri =

Lebanese politician

His Excellency Nabih Berri
- نبيه بري
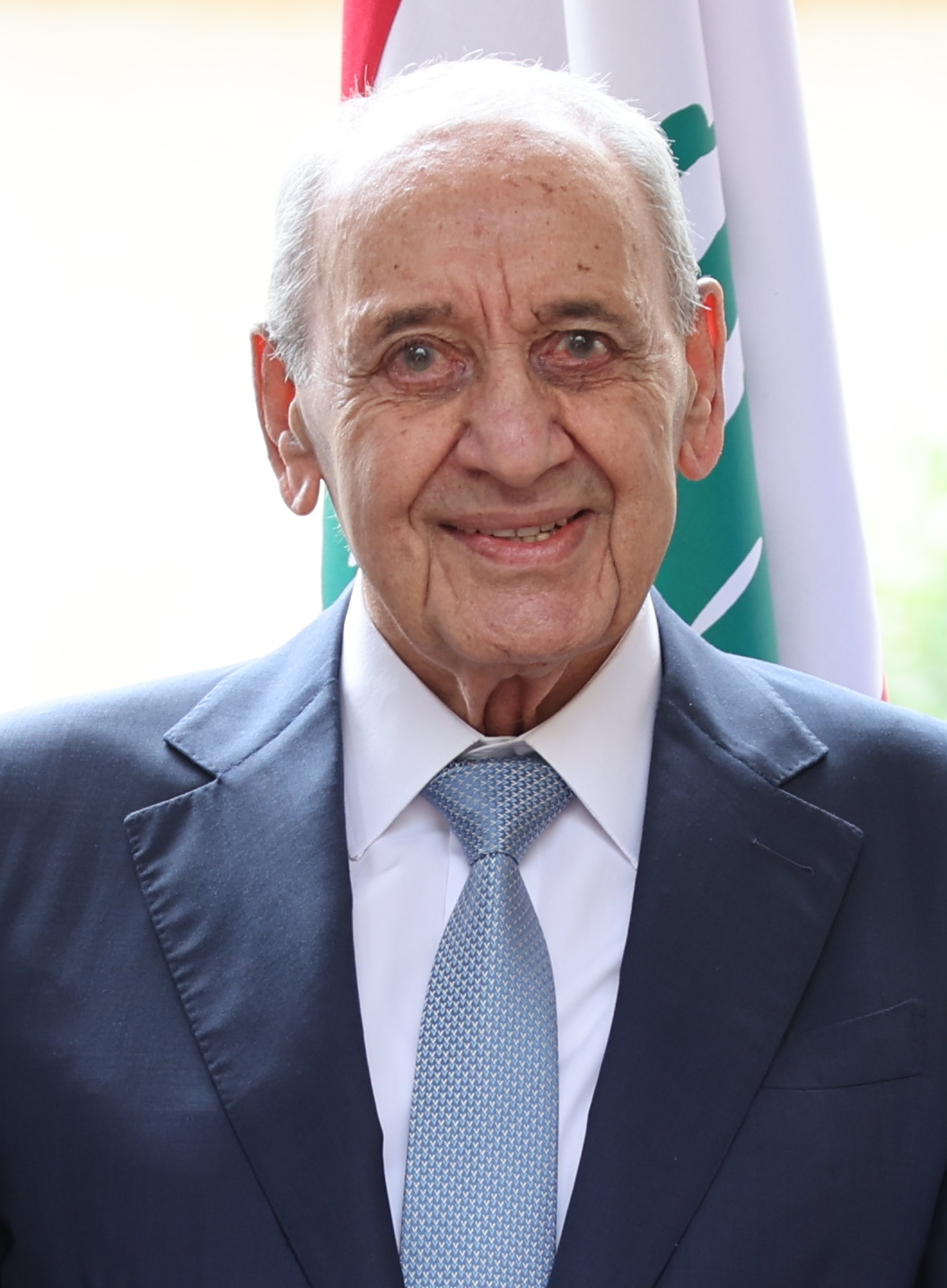
- Berri in 2024

Speaker of the Parliament of Lebanon
- Incumbent
- Assumed office 20 October 1992
- President: Elias Hrawi; Émile Lahoud; Michel Sleiman; Michel Aoun; Joseph Aoun
- Preceded by: Hussein el-Husseini

President of the Amal Movement
- Incumbent
- Assumed office 1980
- Preceded by: Hussein el-Husseini

Personal details
- Born: 28 January 1938 (age 88) Bo, British Sierra Leone
- Party: Amal Movement
- Spouse(s): Lila Berri (div.); Randa Berri
- Children: 10
- Education: Lebanese University
- Website: www.nabihberry.com

Nabih Mustafa Berri (Arabic: نبيه مصطفى برّي, romanized: Nabīh Muṣṭafā Barriyy; born 28 January 1938) is a Lebanese politician who has been serving as Speaker of the Parliament of Lebanon since 1992. He heads the Amal Movement and its parliamentary wing, Development and Liberation Bloc.

== Early life and education ==
He was born in Bo, Sierra Leone to Lebanese Shia parents on 28 January 1938. His father, Mustafa Berri, was a trader there.

Berri went to school in Tibnin and Ain Ebel in southern Lebanon, then continued his education in Bint Jbeil and Jaafariya supplementary schools in southern Lebanon and later studied at the Makassed and the Ecole de la Sagesse in Beirut. He graduated with a law degree from the Lebanese University in 1963, where he had served as the student body president, and became a lawyer at the Court of Appeals.

== Early career ==
During 1963, Berri was elected as president of the National Union of Lebanese Students, and participated in student and political conferences. During his early career he became a lawyer at the Court of Appeals. In the early 1970s, he worked in Beirut as a lawyer for several companies. At the same time, Berri became an early follower of Iranian-born Lebanese Shia cleric and imam, Musa al-Sadr.

=== Lebanese Civil War ===
In 1980, Berri was elected leader of the Amal Movement, and led the resistance against the Israeli army especially in the south of Lebanon and Beqaa and the most famous battle was the battle of Khalde in 1982.

Berri agreed to participate in the Salvation Committee, a body set up by President Elias Sarkis following the Israeli invasion. The committee included Bachir Gemayel, the Maronite commander of the Lebanese Forces. Husayn Al-Musawi considered Berri's actions "treasonous" and Amal's orientation too secular. In response, Musawi declared Berri a traitor, and broke from Amal to set up his own faction called the Islamic Amal. The movement's ranks rapidly grew to around 1,000 militants.

Berri was the key player of the Intifada of 6 February 1984 with his ally Walid Jumblatt leader of the Progressive Socialist Party against the Lebanese sectarian government of Amin Gemayel, where officers and soldiers were called to defect from the Lebanese Army and made ground for the Taif agreement that ended the civil war.

There are allegations that the Amal Movement, which has been led since 1980 by Nabih Berri, forced the Palestinians besieged in 1985 to resort to eating dog and cat meat. He is accused of being a "pillar of corruption, illicit enrichment, and the misuse of his office".

In May 1984 Berri joined the National Unity government as minister of state for South Lebanon and reconstruction under Prime Minister Rashid Karami. He also served as the minister of housing and co-operatives.

== Political career ==
Berri served as a cabinet minister from 1984 to 1992:

- 30 April 1984 to 22 September 1988: Minister of Justice in the government of Rashid Karami.
- 25 November 1989 to 24 December 1990: Minister of Hydraulic & Electric Resources in the government of Selim Hoss.
- 25 November 1989 to 24 December 1990: Minister of Housing & Cooperatives in the government of Selim Hoss.
- 16 May 1992 to 31 October 1992: Minister of state in the government of Rachid Solh.

Due to strong Syrian backing and to Berri's proximity to Syrian officials in Lebanon, he was reported to have the biggest influence in the Lebanese government formed after the Taif Accord.

Berri headed the list of "Liberation" in the parliamentary elections that took place in southern Lebanon on 6 September 1992, which was won in full. The other lists he headed were "Liberation and Development" in the parliamentary elections on 8 September 1996, which was won in full. Since 1992 he has chaired the Development and Liberation parliamentary bloc.

Berri headed the list of "Resistance and Development" in the parliamentary elections that took place in southern Lebanon on 3 September 2000, which was won in full. He also headed the list of Liberation and Development in the parliamentary elections which took place in June 2005, which was won in full. Currently, Berri heads the list of "Liberation and Development" in the parliamentary elections on 7 June 2009. All the members of the Bloc won the elections in 2009.

=== Speaker ===
He was elected Speaker of the parliament of Lebanon for the first time on 20 October 1992 (105 out of 124 votes). He was re-elected for a second time on 22 October 1996 (122 out of 126 votes). He was elected to the same post on 17 October 2000 unanimously (124 out of 126 votes), on 28 June 2005 (90 out of 126 votes), on 25 June 2009 (90 out of 127 votes), and on 23 May 2018 (98 out of 128 votes). This makes him the longest-serving head of a legislative assembly in the world.

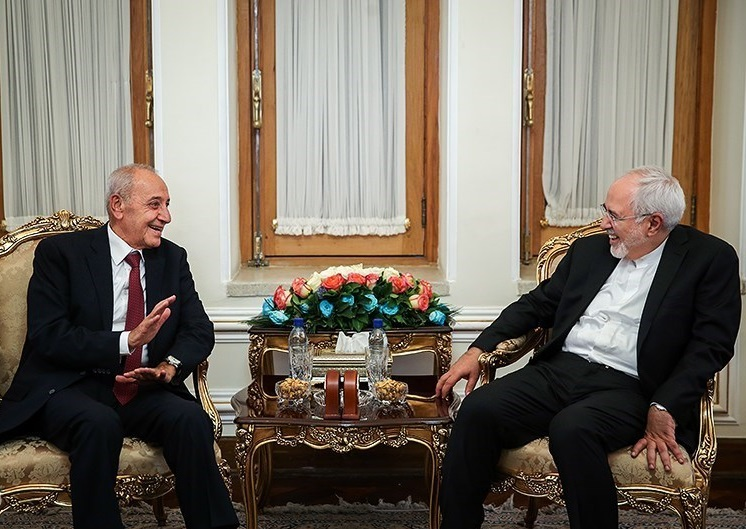
Iranian foreign minister, Mohammad Javad Zarif (right) meeting with Berri in his office in Tehran

Since 1999, he has chaired the Arab Parliament Committee in charge of disclosing Israeli crimes against Arab civilians. On 3 June 2003, he was elected president of the Arab Parliament and handed the presidency in Damascus on 1 March 2004 for a period of two years. He was elected president of the Council of the Parliamentary Union of the Member States.

On 9 March 2004, Nabih Berri was elected President of the Parliamentary Union of the OIC Member States in Dakar-Senegal until 9 March 2006.

Nabih Berri has supported dialogue between all Lebanese parties, religions and sects. During the last national dialogue session in May 2014, Speaker Nabih Berri stressed that "power-sharing between Christians and Muslims in Lebanon would not change under any circumstance," adding that he spoke on behalf of the Shia, Sunnis and the Druze. In 2013 and 2014 he supported the UCC, the teachers, public employees, and the armed forces in Lebanon, in their fight to increase their salaries, and has held many meetings with political leaders in an effort to attain his goal.

Since 1993, Berri has chaired the Union of Parliamentarians of Lebanese Descent, including 156 members of parliament and senators from 19 countries.

In December 2025 according to Nidaa Al-Watan Berri sent Tehran three demands: Lebanon's full neutrality in any Iran-Israel clash, a fatwa from Khamenei allowing Hezbollah to surrender its precision weapons in exchange for a US backed deal to end the war, and urgent financial aid for displaced Shiite communities. Iran agreed only to the funding, dodging the neutrality and fatwa requests, which has deepened fears among Shiite political and religious figures that Tehran intends to preserve its leverage in Lebanon. This unease came as Iran publicly insisted it does not interfere in Lebanese affairs and that Hezbollah independently manages its weapons.

In March 2026, following Iran's war with the United States and Israel, and Hezbollah's attacks on Israel, Berri stated he was "shocked" by the organization's latest actions, causing him to move closer to the Lebanese state, rather than protecting Hezbollah.

== Personal life ==
Berri has married twice and he has six children with Lila, his first wife, and four with his second wife, Randa Assi Berri.

== Electoral history ==
Year	Office	Party	Votes			Result	Ref.
Year	Office	Party	Total	%	P.	Result	Ref.
1992	Speaker	Amal Movement	105	82%	1st	Won	
1996	Speaker	Amal Movement	122	95%	1st	Won	
2000	Speaker	Amal Movement	124	97%	1st	Won	
2005	Speaker	Amal Movement	90	70%	1st	Won	
2009	Speaker	Amal Movement	90	70%	1st	Won	
2018	Deputy	Amal Movement	42,137	28.61%	1st	Won	
2018	Speaker	Amal Movement	98	76%	1st	Won	
2022	Deputy	Amal Movement	42,091	32.57%	1st	Won	
2022	Speaker	Amal Movement	65	50.78%	1st	Won	
