= Bassam el-Shammaa =

Bassam El Shammaa is a researcher in Egyptology and senior tour guide.

== Save the Sphinx campaign ==
Shammaa, having expressed concern for the conditions in which the Sphinx monument and its surroundings exist, began an awareness campaign online during 2007. The response from the Supreme Council of Antiquities (SCA) stated that a team of Cairean experts had been deployed with the goal of containing the risk. At the time of the article's publication, the head of the SCA, Zahi Hawass had stated that geological experts were compiling a report on the degree of risk present.

During 2007 it was reported in the Daily News Egypt that Shammaa considered it possible that there had been two Sphinx statues present at the site of the existing monument, a position he had stated was supported by the traditionally considered position on the subject. This opinion was in contrary to the thought that the Sphinx is, in fact, the sole constructive at the location, designed to guard the Pyramids. Support for Shammaa's position was given (amongst others) by the Thutmosis IV stele showing, in fact, two sphinxes. To conclude the content of the article (as reported) stated that John Gardner Wilkinson considered the argument to be unsolvable.

== Appeal to rebuild the Lighthouse of Alexandria ==
The Alexandrian magazine Amwag stated the first call for the rebuilding of the structure was from El Hadidi in 1978 to Dr Helmy the then governor of Alexandria, and he proceeded to promote the notion within the international media. At the time preliminary plans to begin the construction progress were arrested by the change of governorship. Shammaa in 2008 appealed to the relevant bodies of Egypt to consider the proposed rebuilding, stating that since sufficient information available from early historical documentation and the measurements and plans taken at the 1978, the construction should proceed.

== Proposal of mummy return ==
His motivation to begin the campaign arose from his observations of reactions of some visitors to the tomb site. He said that maintaining the mummified bodies at locations outside of Egypt was disrespectful of the tradition of Egypt and the "sanctity and integrity of the dead".

== Published works ==
Egypt: Future of the Past ISBN 0-9658039-1-0 / 0-9658039-1-0 Bassaam ElShammaa`. on Sekhmet neing "Our Mother the Ogress/`أمنا الغولة' in folktales" among Egyptians now. 2017لأربعاء، 06 ديسمبر December Wed. 7&th Day. This data is provided/added by Hasan El-Shamy.
