= Bassam Abu Abdullah =

Syrian Ba'athist politician

Bassam Abu Abdallah
- Born: 1960s Masyaf, Syria

Academic background
- Education: High Institute of Political Sciences; Uzbek Academy of Sciences

Bassam Abu Abdallah (Arabic: بسام أبو عبد الله; born in the 1960s) is a Syrian writer and political analyst. He is also the director of the Baath Party Central School and is a professor of international relations at the University of Damascus. He held a diplomatic post at the Syrian Embassy in Ankara, Turkey between 2004 and 2008.

He holds a bachelor's degree in political science and a Ph.D. in international relations from the University of Uzbekistan in 1993. He appears regularly on Arabic media outlets.

He speaks English, Russian, and has a good understanding of Turkish.
