= Bassam Tahhan =

French-Syrian academic

Bassam Tahhan is a Syrian-born French professor of Arabic literature and expert on the Quran. As of 2006 he taught at the Henri IV secondary school in Paris. Tahhan advocates a Protestant reformation in Islam. He defines a "Protestant Islam," as "Islam that allows freedom of thought and permits questioning the Sunna, abrogating hadiths not grounded in the Koran, and reinterpreting the Koran in light of modern values."

Tahhan believes in a rationalist approach to the Quran, which he believes means accepting "that each era, with its [particular] methods and discoveries, presents its own reading of the Koran, and this is the way it will be until the end of days." In doing so he came into conflict with what he calls the "orthodox approach" to the Quran. He believes that over time in the Muslim community the Sunna has "become an indispensable supplement to the Koran, to the point that it superseded the Koran." He finds this "tendency to supplement the Koran with the Sunna ... questionable."

He has been described as "one of a handful of experts around the world on the different versions of the Koran."
