= Speaker of the Parliament of Lebanon =

Position in Lebanon government

Speaker of the Parliament of the Lebanese Republic
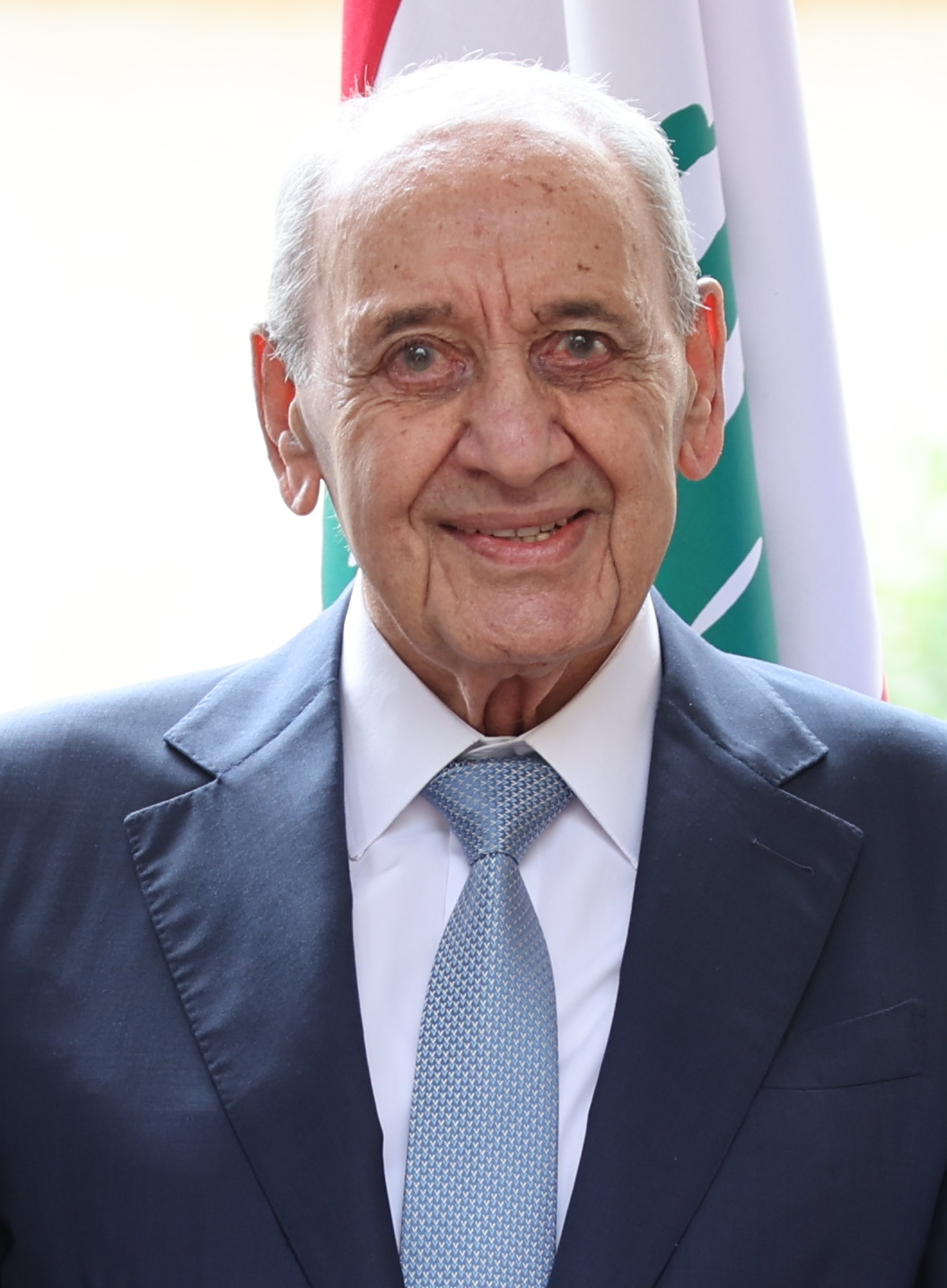
- Incumbent; Nabih Berri since 20 October 1992
- Style: His Excellency
- Residence: Beirut
- Term length: 4 years
- Inaugural holder: Sabri Hamadé; 21 September 1943
- Formation: Constitution of Lebanon; 23 May 1926
- Salary: £L 212,844,000 annually

The legislative speaker of Lebanon is the highest office in the legislative body of Lebanon.

The current legislative body is the Parliament of Lebanon, headed by the Speaker of the Parliament of Lebanon, officially called the President of the Chamber of Deputies of the Lebanese Republic (Arabic: رئيس مجلس نواب الجمهورية اللبنانية, romanized: Raʼīs Majlis Nawwāb al-Jumhūrīyah al-Lubnānīyah).

The speaker and his deputy are elected by the majority of deputies vote. By convention, the speaker is always a Shia Muslim.

As of 2026 Nabih Berri was speaker, and had been since 1992.

== See also ==
- President of Lebanon
- Prime Minister of Lebanon
