= List of Ba'athist movements =

The Arab Socialist Ba'ath Party (Arabic: حزب البعث العربي الاشتراكي, romanized: Hizb Al-Ba'ath Al-'Arabi Al-Ishtiraki) was a political party mixing Arab nationalist and Arab socialist interests, opposed to imperialism, and calling for the renaissance or resurrection and unification of the Arab world into a single state. Ba'ath is also spelled Ba'th or Baath and means "rebirth," "resurrection," "restoration," or "renaissance" (reddyah). Its motto — "Unity, Liberty, Socialism" (wahda, hurriya, ishtirakiya) — refers to Arab unity, and freedom from non-Arab control and interference. Its ideology of Arab socialism is notably different in origins and practice from classical Marxism and is similar in outlook to 'third-worldism'.

The party was founded in 1940 by the Syrian intellectuals Michel Aflaq and Salah al-Din al-Bitar. It has established branches in different Arab countries, although it has only ever held power in Syria and Iraq. In Syria it held a monopoly on political power following the party's 1963 coup. Ba'athists also seized power in Iraq in 1963, but were deposed some months later. They returned to power in a 1968 coup and remained the sole party of government until the 2003 invasion of Iraq. Since the invasion, the party has been banned in Iraq.

In 1966, a coup d'état by the military against the historical leadership of Aflaq and Bitar led the Syrian and Iraqi parties to split into rival organizations — the Qotri (or regionalist) Syria-based party and the Qawmi (or nationalist) Iraq-based party. Both retained the Ba'ath name and parallel structures within the Arab world, but hostilities between them grew to the point that Ba'athist Syria became the only Arab government to support Iran (a non-Arabic nation) against Ba'athist Iraq during the Iran–Iraq War.

On 8 December 2024, Syrian opposition forces entered the Syrian capital Damascus, announcing the fall of the Syrian Ba'ath Party regime that had lasted for 53 years under the Assad family.

== Major groups ==
Party	Founded	Dissolved	Founder(s)	Notes
Arab Ba'ath	1940	1947	Zaki al-Arsuzi	The party merged with the Arab Ba'ath Movement to form the Arab Ba'ath Party in 1947.
Arab Ba'ath Movement	1940	1947	Michel Aflaq and Salah al-Din al-Bitar	The direct predecessor to the Arab Socialist Ba'ath Party, it merged with the Arab Ba'ath to form the Arab Ba'ath Party in 1947.
Ba'ath Party	1947	1966	Michel Aflaq and Salah al-Din al-Bitar	Founded as the Arab Ba'ath Party, it later merged with the Arab Socialist Party in 1952 and renamed itself the Arab Socialist Ba'ath Party. The party broke into two in 1966, between rival Baghdad and Damascus-based factions.

== Regional branches ==
Ba'ath Party (Iraqi-dominated faction)
Region		Founded	Leader
Algeria	Arab Socialist Ba'ath Party of Algeria	1988	Ahmed Choutri
Bahrain	Nationalist Democratic Assembly	1992	Rasul al-Jishi
Egypt	Arab Socialist Ba'ath Party – Egypt Region	1991	
Iraq	Arab Socialist Ba'ath Party – Iraq Region	1951	Salah Al-Mukhtar
Jordan	Jordanian Arab Socialist Ba'ath Party	1948/1951	Founded by a group of teachers.
Kuwait	Arab Socialist Ba'ath Party – Kuwait Region	1955	Faisal al-Sani
Lebanon	Socialist Arab Lebanon Vanguard Party	1966	Abdel Majid Mohamed Tayeb Rafei
Libya	Libyan Arab Socialist Ba'ath Party	1954	
Mauritania	National Vanguard Party	1991	Mohamed Ould Abdellahi Ould Eyye
Palestine	Arab Liberation Front	1969	Mahmoud Ismael
Sahrawi Arab Democratic Republic	Sahrawi Socialist Baath Party	1995	Najim Oumejjoud
Sudan	Arab Socialist Ba'ath Party – Region of Sudan	1970	Kamal Bolad
Tunisia	Tunisian Ba'ath Movement	1988	Omar Othman Belhadj
Syria	Arab Socialist Ba'ath	1947	
Yemen	National Arab Socialist Ba'ath Party – Yemen Region	1955–1956	Qassam Salam Said
Ba'ath Party (Syrian-dominated faction)
Region		Founded	Leader
Bahrain	Arab Socialist Ba'ath		
Iraq	Arab Socialist Ba'ath	1966	Mahmud al-Shaykh Radhi
Jordan	Arab Ba'ath Progressive Party	1993	Fuad Dabbour
Lebanon	Arab Socialist Ba'ath Party – Lebanon Region	1949	Fayez Shukr
Mauritania	Socialist Democratic Unionist Party	1994	Mahfouz Weld al-Azizi
Palestine	As-Sa'iqa	1966	Farhan Abu Al-Hayja
Sudan	Arab Socialist Ba'ath Party – Organization of Sudan	1980	at-Tijani Mustafa Yassin
Syria	Arab Socialist Ba'ath Party – Syria Region	1943	Bashar al-Assad
Tunisia	Party of the Democratic Arab Vanguard		Kheireddine Souabni
Yemen	Arab Socialist Ba'ath Party – Yemen Region	1951	Mahmoud Abdul-Wahab Abdul-Hamid
South Yemen	People's Vanguard Party (Yemen)	late 1950s	

== Splinter-groups ==
Party	Founded	Dissolved	Founder(s)	Notes
Socialist Lebanon	1965	1970	Ahmed Beydoun	The party was merged into the Communist Action Organization in Lebanon in 1970.
Arab Socialist Revolutionary Ba'ath Party	1960	1962/63	Abdullah Rimawi	
Arab Revolutionary Workers Party	1966	–	Yasin al-Hafiz	Still active, as of 2011
Democratic Socialist Arab Ba'ath Party	1980	–	Ibrahim Makhous	Is part of the National Democratic Rally and still active in France
Sudanese Ba'ath Party	2002	–	Mohamed Ali Jadin	Was established by a split inside the Arab Socialist Ba'ath Party – Country of Sudan, the pro-Iraqi ba'ath branch.
