= National Command of the Ba'ath Party =

Ruling organ of the Ba'ath Party, 1954–1966

- Arab Ba'ath: 1940–1947
- Arab Ba'ath Movement: 1940–1947
- Ba'ath Party: 1947–1966
- Baath Party (pro-Iraqi): 1968–2003
- Baath Party (pro-Syrian): 1966–2024

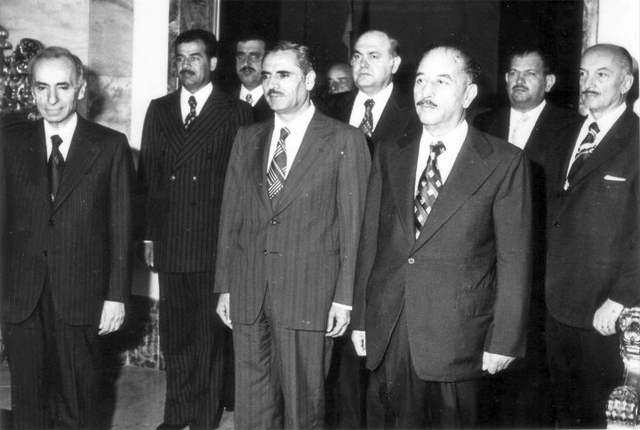
National Command of the Iraqi Ba'ath party.

The National Command of the Arab Socialist Ba'ath Party was the ruling organ of the Ba'ath Party between sessions of the National Congress, and was headed by a secretary general. Between National Congresses, the National Command was held accountable by the National Consultative Council (Arabic: al-majlis al-istishari al-quami). The National Consultative Council was a forum made up of representatives from the party's regional branches. However, the number of National Consultative Council members were decided by the size of the regional branch. The National Congress elected the National Command, National Tribunal, the party's discipline body, and the secretary general, the party leader. The congress delegates determined the party's policies and procedures.

The National Command had sweeping authority. The National Congress was the only body which could hold a vote of confidence against the National Command. It had the authority to establish party organizations, to direct the affairs of subordinate party organs which, according to the party's Internal Rules, could not "for any reason direct themselves", the authority to elect and dissolve a Regional Command, to approve party-to-party cooperation, to approve of the party's participation in government and legislative assemblies, to publish works in the party's name, to direct party policy on international affairs and decide on all matters regarding party policy. Because of these responsibilities several National Command organs were established, such as the Secretariat and the National Liaisons Office.

Before 1954, the party was ruled by the Executive Committee, but this organ, along with others, were replaced at the 2nd National Congress (for more, see "Structure" section). In Ba'athist jargon "Nation" means the Arab Nation, and because of that, the National Command formed the highest policy-making and coordinating council for the Ba'ath movement throughout the Arab world. The National Command had several bureaus, similar to those of the Regional Command. National Command sessions were held monthly. Of these, the National Liaisons Office was responsible for maintaining contact with the party's Regional Branches.

== Structure ==
Amid

- Michel Aflaq (1947–1954)

Secretaries General

- Michel Aflaq (1954–1965)
- Munif Razzaz (1965–1966)

National Congresses

- 1st National Congress (4–6 April 1947)
- 2nd National Congress (June 1954)
- 3rd National Congress (27 August – 1 September 1959)
- 4th National Congress (August 1960)
- 5th National Congress (8 May 1962)
- 6th National Congress (5–23 October 1963)
- 7th National Congress (12–17 February 1964)
- 8th National Congress (April 1965)

National Consultative Council
National Tribunal
Organs of the National Command

- Secretariat
- Cultural and Research Department
- Propaganda Department
- Publications Department
- Information Department
- Finance Department
- National Liaisons Office

== Members ==
Members of the Executive Committee and the 2nd–8th National Commands
Name	Took office	Left office	Representing (Regional Branch)	Term(s)	Duration	Note
Michel Aflaq	6 April 1947	23 February 1966	Syria	8	18 years, 323 days	Served as the party's Secretary General from 1947 to 1965.
Salah al-Din al-Bitar	6 April 1947	1 September 1959	Syria	2	12 years, 148 days	—
Jalil al-Sayyide	6 April 1947	June 1954	—	1	7 years, 56 days	—
Wahib al-Ghanim	6 April 1947	1952	Syria	1	4 years, 270 days	—
Midhat al-Bitar	1949	1952	—	1	3 years, 0 days	—
Fuysal ar-Rikte	1949	1952	—	1	3 years, 0 days	—
Abdul Rahman Mandhur	1949	1952	—	1	3 years, 0 days	—
Akram al-Hawrani	1952	1 September 1959	Syria	1	7 years, 243 days	The former leader of the Arab Socialist Party.
Attun Mandisi	1952	June 1954	—	1	2 years, 151 days	A politician from the Arab Socialist Party.
Fuad al-Rikabi	June 1954	August 1960	Iraq	2	6 years, 61 days	Served as the Regional Secretary of the Iraqi Regional Branch.
Ali Jabir	June 1954	23 October 1964	Lebanon	4	9 years, 144 days	Served as the Regional Secretary of the Lebanese Regional Branch.
Abdullah Rimawi	June 1954	1 September 1959	Jordan	1	5 years, 92 days	Served as the Regional Secretary of the Jordanese Regional Branch.
Abdallah Na'was	June 1954	1 September 1959	Jordan	1	5 years, 92 days	—
Abd al-Wahhab Shumitli	1 September 1959	May 1962	Lebanon	2	2 years, 242 days	—
Ghassan Shararah	1 September 1959	May 1962	Lebanon	2	2 years, 242 days	—
Talib El-Shibib	1 September 1959	May 1962	Iraq	2	2 years, 242 days	Served as the Regional Secretary of the Iraqi Regional Branch.
Sa'dun Hammadi	1 September 1959	May 1962	Iraq	2	2 years, 242 days	—
Khaled Yashruti	1 September 1959	23 October 1963	Palestine	3	4 years, 52 days	Was elected to the National Command at the 3rd National Congress as a Lebanese Regional Branch representative.
Munif Razzaz	1 September 1959	23 February 1966	Jordan	5	6 years, 175 days	Served as the party's Secretary General from 1965 to 1966.
Amin Shuqayr	1 September 1959	August 1960	Jordan	1	335 days	—
Amin Shuqayr	May 1962	23 October 1963	Jordan	1	1 year, 175 days	—
Faysal Habib Khayzaran	August 1960	May 1962	Iraq	1	1 year, 273 days	—
Khalid Ali Salih Dulaymi	August 1960	May 1962	Iraq	1	1 year, 273 days	—
Ghalib Yaghi	August 1960	May 1962	Lebanon	1	1 year, 273 days	—
Ali Salih al-Sadi	May 1962	18 February 1964	Iraq	2	1 year, 293 days	Served as the Regional Secretary of the Iraqi Regional Branch.
Hamid Abd al-Majid	May 1962	18 February 1964	Iraq	2	1 year, 293 days	Served as the Regional Secretary of the Iraqi Regional Branch.
Jibran Majdalani	May 1962	23 February 1966	Lebanon	4	3 years, 298 days	—
Abd al-Majid Rafi	May 1962	23 October 1963	Lebanon	1	1 year, 175 days	Served as the Regional Secretary of the Lebanese Regional Branch.
Abd al-Majid Rafi	18 February 1964	April 1965	Lebanon	1	1 year, 42 days	Served as the Regional Secretary of the Lebanese Regional Branch.
Khalid al-Ali	May 1962	April 1965	Lebanon	3	2 years, 335 days	—
Amin al-Hafiz	23 October 1963	23 February 1966	Syria	3	2 years, 123 days	Served as the Regional Secretary of the Syrian Regional Branch.
Salah Jadid	23 October 1963	23 February 1966	Syria	3	2 years, 123 days	Served as the Assistant Regional Secretary of the Syrian Regional Branch.
Hammud al-Shufi	23 October 1963	18 February 1964	Syria	1	118 days	Served as the Regional Secretary of the Syrian Regional Branch.
Muhsin Shaykh Radi	23 October 1963	18 February 1964	Iraq	1	118 days	—
Ahmed Hassan al-Bakr	23 October 1963	23 February 1966	Iraq	3	2 years, 123 days	Served as the Regional Secretary of the Iraqi Regional Branch.
Salih Mahdi Ammash	23 October 1963	18 February 1964	Iraq	1	118 days	—
Abd al-Muhsin Abu Mayzar	23 October 1963	18 February 1964	Jordan	1	118 days	—
Muhammad Umran	18 February 1964	May 1965	Syria	1	1 year, 73 days	—
Mansur al-Atrash	18 February 1964	23 February 1966	Syria	1	2 years, 5 days	—
Shibli al-Aysami	18 February 1964	23 February 1966	Syria	1	2 years, 5 days	—
Ali Khalil	18 February 1964	23 February 1966	Lebanon	2	2 years, 5 days	—
Ali Ghannam	18 February 1964	23 February 1966	Saudi Arabia	2	2 years, 5 days	—
Hafez al-Assad	May 1965	23 February 1966	Syria	1	328 days	—
Ibrahim Makhous	May 1965	23 February 1966	Syria	1	328 days	—

== Bibliography ==
- Commins, Dean (2004). Historical Dictionary of Syria. Scarecrow Press. ISBN 0-8108-4934-8.
- Devlin, John (1975). The Baath Party: a History from its Origins to 1966 (2nd ed.). Hoover Institute Press. ISBN 978-0-8179-6561-7.
- Rabinovich, Itamar (1972). Syria Under the Baʻth, 1963–66: The Army Party Symbiosis. Transaction Publishers. ISBN 0-7065-1266-9.
