= Fuad al-Rikabi =

Ba'athist politician

- فؤاد الركابي
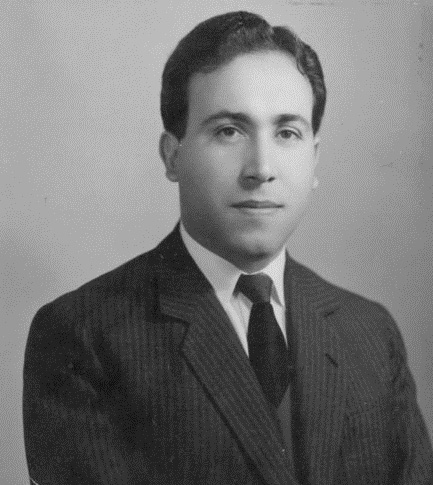

Minister of Rural Affairs
- In office November 1964 – 10 July 1965
- Prime Minister: Tahir Yahya
- Preceded by: Post established
- Succeeded by: Ahmad 'Abd al-Hadi al-Habboubi

Minister of Development
- In office 14 July 1958 – 7 February 1959
- Prime Minister: Abd al-Karim Qasim
- Preceded by: Post established
- Succeeded by: Talat al-Shaybani

Regional Secretary of the Regional Command of the Iraqi Regional Branch
- In office 1954 – 29 November 1959
- National Secretary: Michel Aflaq
- Preceded by: Fakhri Qadduri
- Succeeded by: Talib Hussein ash-Shabibi

Member of the National Command of the Arab Socialist Ba'ath Party
- In office June 1954 – August 1960

Member of the Regional Command of the Iraqi Regional Branch
- In office December 1955 – 29 November 1959

Personal details
- Born: 1932 Nasiriyah, Kingdom of Iraq
- Died: December 1971 (age 39) Baghdad, Ba'athist Iraq
- Party: Iraqi Regional Branch of the Arab Socialist Ba'ath Party (1951–1961); Arab Socialist Union
- Religion: Shia Islam

Fuad al-Rikabi (Arabic: فؤاد الركابي, romanized: Fuʾād al-Riqābī; 1932 – December 1971) was an Iraqi politician and the founder of the Iraqi Regional Branch of the Arab Socialist Ba'ath Party. Al-Rikabi became the Secretary of Iraqi Regional Command of the Ba'ath Party in 1954 and held the post until 1959. Throughout his term of leadership, the Iraqi Regional Branch expanded its membership and became a leading party in Iraq's political landscape. Following the 14 July Revolution of 1958 which toppled the monarchy, al-Rikabi was appointed Minister of Development in Abd al-Karim Qasim's unity government.

As soon as the government was established, a power struggle quickly began between Qasim, an Iraqi nationalist who was supported by the Iraqi Communist Party, and Abdul Salam Arif, an Arab nationalist. Al-Rikabi supported the latter. Along with other cabinet members, al-Rikabi resigned in protest when Arif lost the power struggle in late 1958. Al-Rikabi and the Iraqi Regional Branch of the Ba'ath Party came to the conclusion that the only way to expedite Iraq's entry into the United Arab Republic was to assassinate Qasim. The assassination attempt failed, and most of the leading Ba'athists and co-conspirators, including al-Rikabi, fled to Syria. Shortly after, on 29 November 1959, the Iraqi Regional Command was dissolved.

Al-Rikabi supported the Nasserist faction—supporters of Gamal Abdel Nasser—in a power struggle within the Ba'ath Party in the late 1950s against the Aflaqites, supporters of Michel Aflaq. He agreed with Abdullah Rimawi's observation that the National Command, the ruling organ of the Ba'ath Party, had deviated from Ba'athist thought. Al-Rikabi tried but failed to get the Iraqi Regional Branch of the Ba'ath Party to break away from the National Command, and on 15 June 1961 he was expelled from the party. From then on al-Rikabi was a prominent Nasserite, active first in Rimawi's Revolutionary Ba'ath Command and then in Arif's Arab Socialist Union. Following the Ba'ath Party's seizure of power in the 17 July Revolution of 1968, al-Rikabi was arrested. He was killed by fellow inmates according to an official account, media unaffiliated to the Iraqi state claimed he was killed by the Iraqi security services.

== Early life and career ==
Al-Rikabi was born into a Shia Muslim family in Nasiriyah in 1932. He attended the engineering school in Baghdad. The Iraqi Regional Branch of the Arab Socialist Ba'ath Party was established either in 1951 or 1952. While there is some confusion between the various sources, some historians claim Rikabi became Regional Secretary in either 1951 or 1952 and was the Iraqi Regional Branch's first head, others claim that he took the post first in 1954 (succeeding Fakhri Qadduri).

The party initially consisted of a majority of Shia Muslims, as al-Rikabi recruited supporters mainly from his friends and family, but it slowly became Sunni-dominated. Between 1952 and 1963, 54 per cent of the members of the Ba'ath Regional Command were considered Shia Muslims. This majority is largely explained by al-Rikabi's effective recruitment drive in Shia areas. Between 1963 and 1970, after al-Rikabi's resignation, Shia representation in the Regional Command dropped to 14 percent. However, of the three factions which existed within the Ba'ath Party, two had Shia leaders. According to police records membership of the Iraqi Regional Branch had increased to 289 by 1955. Two years later al-Rikabi affiliated the Iraqi Regional Branch with the National Front, an opposition group that consisted of the Iraqi Communist Party, the National Democratic Party, and the Istiqlal Party. The front welcomed the 14 July Revolution of 1958, which toppled the Iraqi monarchy. Following the revolution, Iraqi Regional Branch membership increased; 300 people had joined the party, 1,200 were organized helpers, 2,000 were organized supporters, and an estimated 10,000 people were unorganized supporters according to al-Rikabi.

=== Qasim years ===
A cabinet headed by Abd al-Karim Qasim as Prime Minister and Minister of Defence was established shortly after the 14 July Revolution. Al-Rikabi, who represented the Ba'ath Party, was appointed Minister of Development. Shortly after the new government took control, a power struggle began between Qasim, who represented the Iraqi nationalists and the communists, and Abdul Salam Arif, who represented the interests of the Arab nationalists. Iraq had been invited to join the United Arab Republic (UAR), a union consisting of Egypt and Syria. Michel Aflaq, the principal founder of Ba'athism, the Ba'ath Party, and the UAR, visited Iraq by the end of July 1958 to try to convince Qasim's government to join the UAR. Arif lost the power struggle, and on 30 November 1958 he was forced to resign from his posts of Deputy Prime Minister and Minister of Interior. This in turn led to a clampdown on Arab nationalist activities, which included the Iraqi Regional Branch of the Ba'ath Party. To protest Arif's forced resignation and the increased authoritarian behaviour of Qasim's government, a number of cabinet members, including al-Rikabi, resigned in protest.

The failure of both Arif and the 1959 Mosul Uprising by the pro-UAR colonel Abd al-Wahab al-Shawaf led al-Rikabi and the Iraqi Regional Branch of the Ba'ath Party to conclude that the only way to secure Arab nationalist rule was by assassinating Qasim. Following a slump in Qasim's popularity, the Iraqi Regional Branch set their assassination attempt for 7 October 1959. The attempt failed, and most of the leading Ba'athists and leading figures in the conspiracy, including al-Rikabi, escaped to Syria. The Ba'ath Party's organisation was weakened following the failed assassination attempt, and on 29 November 1959 the Regional Command was dissolved.

=== Expulsion ===
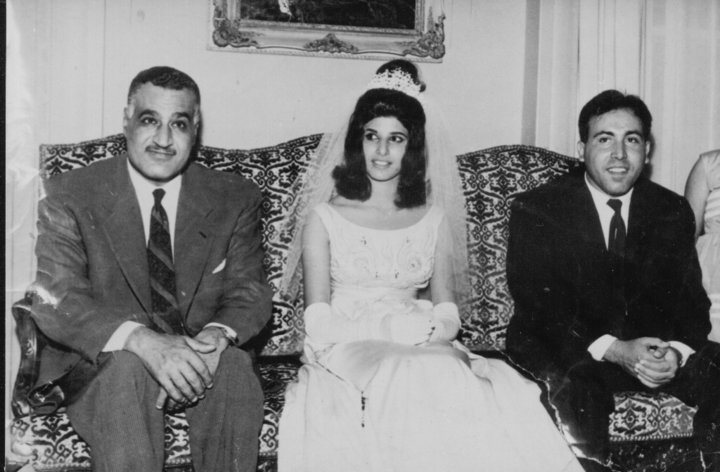
Rikabi with his wife on their wedding day in Egypt in 1963, sitting alongside Egyptian President Gamel Abdel Nasser (left)

During the era of the UAR, the Ba'ath Party was split into two factions; Aflaqites—the followers of Aflaq—and Nasserists—the followers of Gamal Abdel Nasser. In this conflict, al-Rikabi supported the Nasserist faction against the Aflaqists, who controlled the party leadership. The conflict escalated when Abdullah Rimawi, the Secretary of the Jordanian Regional Command of the Ba'ath Party, was deprived of his party posts and established the Revolutionary Ba'ath Command, which opposed the influence of the Aflaqites. Al-Rikabi openly confronted the National Command, the leading organ of the Ba'ath Party, in June 1959. On 24 June he held a press conference in Beirut where he stated that the Iraqi Regional Branch of the Ba'ath Party had broken its relations with the National Command. The reason he gave was that the National Command was led by deviationists. He cited as proof the dissolution of the UAR, the National Command's collaboration with anti-Arab nationalist groups such as the communists, and the expulsion of members who held national revolutionary views. Al-Rikabi also believed that the National Command had lost faith in its Ba'athist beliefs, while the Iraqi Regional Branch needed it the most. The Iraqi Regional Branch was involved in the Mosul uprising of 1959.

The National Command replied to these accusations by declaring that al-Rikabi was unqualified to speak for the party, and furthermore that he had lost his right to speak on the behalf of the Iraqi Regional Branch of the Ba'ath Party when the Iraqi Regional Command was dissolved on 29 November 1959. The reconstituted Iraqi Regional Command passed a resolution on 2 February 1962 which expelled al-Rikabi from the organisation and appointed Talib Hussein ash-Shabibi as secretary general. Attacks on al-Rikabi continued, and the Iraqi Regional Congress in July 1960 called the National Command to initiate an investigation against him. At the fourth national conference in Beirut, the National Command passed a resolution stating that al-Rikabi had henceforth no responsibilities in Ba'ath Party affairs. On 14 October 1960 the Ba'ath Party ordered al-Rikabi to reply to the accusations leveled against him by the Iraqi Regional Congress. Al-Rikabi was expelled from the Ba'ath Party on 15 June 1961 for his failure to reply to the accusations leveled against him, his support for the Revolutionary Ba'ath Command, and his distribution of anti-National Command thoughts not through the proper party organs.

Shortly after al-Rikabi's first confrontation with the National Command, Rimawi published a statement on behalf of the Revolutionary Ba'ath Command that he supported al-Rikabi in his struggle against the National Command. Following the dissolution of the UAR in 1962, the Voice of the Arabs (Radio Cairo), referring to al-Rikabi as "[Secretary General] SG of the Arab Socialist Ba'ath Party of Iraq", announced that they opposed the UAR's break-up. Al-Rikabi was reported to be a member of the Revolutionary Ba'ath Command early in 1962.

== Nasserist years ==
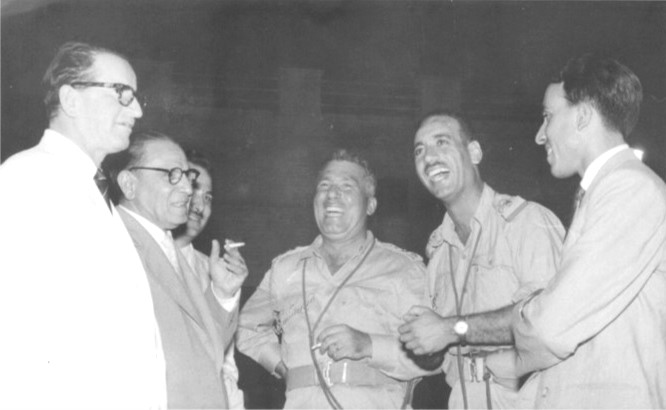
Rikabi (last from right) with Iraqi President Abdul Salam Arif (second from right), 1960s

Together with Rimawi and other Palestinian defectors from the Syrian Regional Branch, al-Rikabi formed the Socialist Unionists Movement, a Nasserist political movement. Al-Rikabi became Minister of Rural Affairs under President Abdul Salam Arif (who overthrew Qasim in 1963) until he resigned in 1965.

== Arrest and death ==
He was arrested in 1971 and was subsequently killed in prison by the Iraqi security service. The official explanation of his death was that he was killed by fellow inmates. The free Arab press, however, blamed the Iraqi government for it.
