= Talib El-Shibib =

60th Iraqi Minister of Foreign Affairs

Regional Secretary of the Regional Command of the Iraqi Regional Branch
- In office 2 February 1960 – May 1962
- National Secretary: Michel Aflaq
- Preceded by: Fuad al-Rikabi
- Succeeded by: Ali Salih al-Sadi

Member of the National Command of the Arab Socialist Ba'ath Party
- In office 1 September 1959 – May 1962

Member of the Regional Command of the Iraqi Regional Branch
- In office 11 November 1963 – February 1964
- In office 1957 – 25 September 1963

Personal details
- Born: 22 March 1934 Al-Hillah
- Died: 12 October 1997 (aged 63) London, United Kingdom
- Party: Iraqi Regional Branch of the Arab Socialist Ba'ath Party

Talib El-Shibib (22 March 1934 – 12 October 1997) was an Iraqi politician. Born in Babylon Province, he studied engineering at Imperial College London.

El-Shibib was elected to the leadership of Arab Socialist Ba'ath Party, and was one of a triumvirate who planned the later coup against President Abdul Karim Qassim. He became foreign minister under the new regime in 1963.

Internal disagreements led him to go in exile. After the second coup in 1968, El-Shibib was given several ambassadorial posts. In 1976 he resigned from the post as Iraqi ambassador to Germany and went into exile again when disagreements arose between him and Saddam Hussein’s policies. He devoted the remainder of his life in exile while campaigning against Saddam and for a democratic Iraq.

Political offices
Preceded by Hashim Jwad	Foreign Minister of Iraq; 1963	Succeeded by Salih Mahdi Ammash
