= Abdullah Rimawi =

Jordanian politician

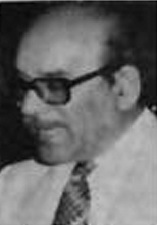
- Portrait of Rimawi

Minister of State for Foreign Affairs
- In office 29 October 1956 – 13 April 1957

Regional Secretary of the Regional Command of the Jordanese Regional Branch
- In office 1952 – 1 September 1959
- Preceded by: None – post established
- Succeeded by: Munif al-Razzaz

Member of the National Command of the Arab Socialist Ba'ath Party
- In office June 1954 – 1 September 1959

Member of the Regional Command of the Jordanese Regional Branch
- In office 1952 – 1 September 1959

Personal details
- Born: 1920 Beit Rima, British Mandate of Palestine
- Died: 5 March 1980 (aged 59–60)

Abdullah Rimawi (Arabic: عبد الله الريماوي; also spelled Abdullah ar-Rimawi, 1920 – 5 March 1980) was the head of the Ba'ath Party in Jordan in the 1950s. He served as Foreign Affairs Minister in Suleiman Nabulsi's government in 1957. A staunch pan-Arabist, Rimawi became one of the most vocal opponents of the Hashemite ruling family in Jordan and favored union with Syria. He fled Jordan in 1957 as the result of a crisis between the leftist government he was a part of and the royal family. He based himself in the United Arab Republic (or the UAR, the result of a union between Egypt and Syria in 1958), where he drew closer to UAR President Gamal Abdel Nasser provoking his expulsion from the Ba'ath Party—which was at odds with Nasser—in 1959. Soon after he founded a splinter party called the Arab Socialist Revolutionary Ba'ath Party. During his exile, he allegedly made a number of attempts to attack or undermine the Jordanian monarchy.

== Early life ==
Rimawi was born in 1920 in the town of Beit Rima, near Ramallah, during the period of British Mandatory rule in Palestine. He attended primary school in his hometown and secondary school at the Arab College in Jerusalem, graduating in 1937. He then enrolled at the American University of Beirut where he studied Western political theory and the rise of nationalism in the Asian continent. He graduated with a BA in mathematics and natural science in 1940. Afterward, Rimawi returned to Palestine and got a job as a professor in the Nablus school authority. He would later work in various high schools in Jaffa, Tulkarm, and Ramla until 1945.

== Palestine War and founding of the Ba'ath in Jordan ==
In 1945, the Arab Higher Committee (AHC; the principal political organ of Palestinian Arabs under the British Mandate) was reestablished and Rimawi was appointed head of its Public Instruction Department. He was a vocal opponent of the Palestine Partition Plan devised in 1947 which proposed the division of Palestine into two separate Arab and Jewish states. In January 1948, during the Palestine War, Rimawi issued a broadcast from AHC radio dismissing claims by the Haganah (the Jewish paramilitary force) that "wealthy Arabs" were fleeing their homes. He stated many Palestinians were simply leaving to join Arab fighters' camps to train themselves for war. That same year, Rimawi had joined the Holy War Army of Abd al-Qadir al-Husayni in 1948.

Rimawi and Abdullah Na'was founded the social, cultural and political al-Baath newspaper in 1948, although at that time neither officially joined the Ba'ath Party. However, with assistance from Cairo-based exiled Jordanian Army general Abdullah el-Tell, both set up the party's branch in Jordan the following year, in 1949. By the end of the war, much of what was the British Mandate of Palestine fell into Israeli hands, but the Arab Legion of Transjordan captured a large swathe of territory called the West Bank. Rimawi, who was popular in the Ramallah-Jerusalem area of the West Bank, publicly opposed the 1949 Armistice Agreements between Israel and Transjordan. On the orders of then-Transjordanian Prime Minister Tawfik Abu al-Huda, he was arrested and imprisoned in the Bayir Jail located in the country's southern desert. On October 18, he went on a hunger strike and was soon released with the aid of Raghib al-Nashashibi who had close relations with Abu al-Huda.

== Political career ==
=== Member of Parliament ===
Rimawi initiated his political career in 1950 when he was elected to the Jordanian Parliament as an independent representative (the Ba'ath Party was officially banned in Jordan at the time) of the District of Ramallah. Along with the rest of the parliament, he voted to officially recognize the new union between the West Bank (which the Arab Legion captured in the 1948 War) and Transjordan to form the Hashemite Kingdom of Jordan under Abdullah I. Prior to his election, he studied law in Jerusalem, gaining a law certificate in 1951. In the spring of 1951, Rimawi hosted the Ba'ath Party's first organizational conference at his Ramallah home. The party's regional command conference, in which Rimawi was selected as the party's secretary-general, was held in 1952. King Hussein had since succeeded his father Talal who had briefly become king following the assassination of Abdullah I. Using his influential relationship among Palestinian circles, Rimawi assisted the Egyptian military attaché in Jordan in setting up the country's first Palestinian fedayeen units whose purpose was to perform armed raids on Israeli territory.

Rimawi was effective in recruiting party members across Jordan and increasing popular support for the Ba'ath Party's Arab nationalist ideas in cities on both sides of the Jordan River, as well as in parliament. He was able to retain his parliamentary seat until 1956. During their service in parliament, Rimawi and Abu Na'was formed the core of the political opposition to the Hashemite ruling-family. The Ba'ath Party was legalized in Jordan in 1955 after a High Court decision was won by party members. During this time period, Rimawi like many of his Arab nationalist colleagues in Jordan, became a fervent supporter of pan-Arabist Egyptian president Gamal Abdel Nasser who, in that year in particular, clinched an arms deal with the Soviet bloc, strongly advocated pan-Arab unity, and adopted "positive neutralism" as the political path of the Arab world during the Cold War era.

=== Foreign Affairs Minister and 1957 crisis ===
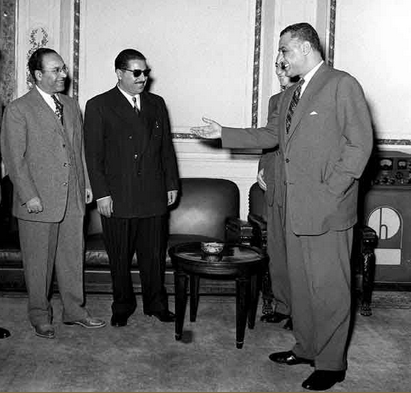
Rimawi (first from left) with President Gamal Abdel Nasser of Egypt (first from right), January 1957

On October 21, 1956, the Ba'ath Party won only two seats of the 40 Lower House seats being contested. However, its ally, the National Socialist Party headed by Sulayman al-Nabulsi, won 12 seats, the most won by any party in the election. The National Communist Party also won three seats and the three parties formed a left-wing Arab nationalist coalition. Following the defeat of his loyalists, King Hussein allowed al-Nabulsi, the new Prime Minister, to form a cabinet of his own choosing. Al-Nabulsi appointed Rimawi to the posts of Minister of State of Foreign Affairs and Deputy Premier. Rimawi became the most outspoken critic of the royal family and managed to exercise extra power by making alliances with other radical anti-royalists in the cabinet and parliament as well as with dissenting officers in the Jordanian Army who called themselves the "Free Officers." He openly declared his opposition to the independence of Jordan, favoring a union with its northern neighbor, Syria.

As criticism of the king mounted, the royal family censored the press, parliamentary debates and shut down five news publications. Rimawi condemned the censorship which he claimed was intended to protect the position of Glubb Pasha, the British commander of the Jordanian Army whose role in the 1948 War was constantly put under scrutiny by the government. Rimawi was the main force behind al-Nabulsi's efforts to replace the annual British subsidy to Jordan with aid from Arab states. In 1956, the United Kingdom intended to cease its aid due to financial difficulties and the United States turned down King Hussein's aid request, prompting him to agree to Rimawi and al-Nabulsi's proposal.

Rimawi became increasingly polarized with regards to the royalists, later being described by a member of the cabinet as "not being an asset to the government because he was always throwing the government against the king." An internal conflict ensued between al-Nabulsi and Rimawi, with the latter advocating a swifter route to pan-Arab unity and the former calling for a more moderate approach. By 1957, al-Nabulsi had seemingly abandoned his centrist position as the middleman between the king and the anti-royalists and drew closer to Rimawi, adopting most of his policies. Rimawi, meanwhile, was developing a close relationship with the influential Arab nationalist army chief-of-staff and an ally of the king, Ali Abu Nuwar. The general mood in the Jordanian political scene was that a coup against the royal family was becoming ever more probable. King Hussein suggested the dismissal of Rimawi to al-Nabulsi in January 1957 citing concerns of a conspiracy against the monarchy.

During his speech to the Jordanian Parliament in February, Rimawi implicitly stated that the chief policy maker in the country was not the king, but rather the parliament and its government. Later, he relayed privately to fellow cabinet member Isa Madanat his advocacy of a coup against the king. The growing divisions between the royal family and the leftist government reached its peak on April 8, 1957; Jordanian Army units led by the Free Officers clashed with troops loyal to King Hussein during a military exercise in az-Zarqa by the former. As a part of the exercise, army units approached the palace of the king's mother and other key royal institutions in az-Zarqa and the outskirts of Amman. This was interpreted as a threat by the royal family. King Hussein reacted forcefully to the incident. After receiving assurances of loyalty from his traditional support base—the Bedouin core of the army, Bedouin tribal chiefs in Transjordan, and the Islamists represented by the Muslim Brotherhood—he declared martial law. As a result, Hussein dismissed the cabinet, dissolved parliament, and banned political parties. Dozens of cabinet members (including al-Nabulsi), army officers, and other leftist politicians were soon arrested, but Rimawi and a number of his allies evaded capture by fleeing to Syria at the height of the crisis. He, Abu Nuwar, and Abdullah Na'was were all sentenced to 15 years in absentia.

=== Split with Ba'ath, formation of splinter party ===
After his arrest warrant, Rimawi lived as a civilian exile in Syria, taking up residence in Damascus. In 1958, Syria and Egypt united under Abdel Nasser's leadership to form the United Arab Republic. With the aid of Abdel Hamid Sarraj, governor-general of the Northern Region (Syria), Rimawi and his fellow exiles, Abu Nuwar chief among them, founded the Revolutionary Council. The organization's chief objective was to topple King Hussein and the Hashemite ruling family of Jordan. With help from the UAR, they attempted to stage a military coup in Jordan coinciding with the overthrow of the Hashemite regime of Iraq in July. The plot was foiled, however, when in that same month, Rimawi's plans were discovered by Jordanian authorities.

Rimawi was a strong supporter of Sarraj and President Nasser while the majority of the party's leadership was becoming increasingly opposed to their policies. In September 1959, during a general convention of the Ba'ath Party (whose Syrian branch had been dissolved as a result of the UAR's formation) in Beirut, Lebanon, Rimawi was dismissed from his post in the party's National Command (BNC). The stated aim of the convention, which Rimawi did not attend, was to "purge opportunistic elements" in the party administration. The BNC accused Rimawi of "disrupting" the party and committing other "grave violations," while not reporting for questioning regarding those acts by the BNC. A few days later, on September 6, Rimawi denied the allegations against him and declared the convention null and void. In January 1960, he announced his congratulations to Nasser on the anniversary of the union, whereas the Syrian Ba'ath leadership only celebrated the union but did not acknowledge Nasser's role in forming it. In May, Rimawi and his colleagues set up a rival Ba'ath Party in Syria named the Revolutionary Ba'ath Party (RBP).

Since political parties were banned in the UAR, the RBP's activities were restricted to the Arab world outside of the UAR although it would be based in Damascus. During the party convention on May 19, none of the Syrian Ba'ath Party members were included while representatives from various countries in the Arab world appointed Rimawi and four other Jordanian exiles to the temporary party command. On August 28, 1959, Rimawi declared the UAR was the "fortress of Arab nationalism" and denounced King Hussein, Abdel Karim Qasim of Iraq and Habib Bourguiba of Tunisia as enemies of Arab nationalism. Rimawi was accused of by Jordanian authorities of personal involvement in an assassination attempt against then-Jordanian Prime Minister Hazza' al-Majali in January 1960. Al-Majali requested the UAR extradite Rimawi to face trial in Jordan, but was refused.

Syria seceded from the UAR in 1961 following an anti-Nasser coup and Rimawi moved to Cairo as a result. He strongly condemned the Ba'athist national command for supporting the secession and together with numerous Syrian and Palestinian party members who defected in protest of the regional command's position and the head of the Iraqi branch Fuad al-Rikabi, they formed a new pro-Nasser gathering called the Socialist Unionists Movement.

== Return to Jordan ==
In 1971, a year after Nasser's death, Rimawi was pardoned by King Hussein and returned to Jordan. Rimawi was one of the last of several former staunch opponents of the monarchy to return from exile between 1961 and 1971.

== Bibliography ==
- Anderson, Betty Signe (2005). Nationalist voices in Jordan: the street and the state. University of Texas Press. ISBN 0-292-70625-1.
- Aruri, Nasser Hassan (1972). Jordan: a study in political development (1921-1965). Springer. ISBN 90-247-1217-3.
- Dann, Uriel (1991). King Hussein and the Challenge of Arab Radicalism: Jordan, 1955-1967. Oxford University Press. ISBN 0195071344.
- Joffe, George H. (2002). Jordan in transition. Palgrave Macmillan. ISBN 0-312-29538-3.
- Morris, Benny (2004). The Birth of the Palestinian Refugee Problem Revisited. Cambridge University Press. ISBN 0-521-00967-7.
- Oron, Yitzhak (1961). Middle East Record Volume 2, 1961. The Moshe Dayan Center.
- Oron, Yitzhak (1960). Middle East Record Volume 1, 1960. The Moshe Dayan Center.
- Shlaim, Avi (2009). Lion of Jordan: The Life of King Hussein in War and Peace. Random House Digital, Inc. ISBN 978-1-4000-7828-8.
