= Socialist Arab Lebanon Vanguard Party =

Socialist Arab Lebanon Vanguard Party حزب طليعة لبنان العربي الاشتراكي
- Leader: Abd al-Majid al-Rafei
- Founded: 1966
- Headquarters: Beirut, Lebanon
- Ideology: Ba'athism; Socialism; Secularism; Saddamism; Anti-Zionism
- Political position: Right-wing (Note: The Iraqi Ba'ath represents the "right-wing" of the Ba'ath movement.)
- International affiliation: Iraqi-led Ba'ath Party
- Colors: Black, Red, White and Green
- Parliament of Lebanon: 0 / 128

Party flag

The Socialist Arab Lebanon Vanguard Party (Arabic: حزب طليعة لبنان العربي الاشتراكي Hizb Al-Taliyeh Lubnan Al-'Arabi Al-Ishtiraki) is a political party in Lebanon. The party was led by Abd al-Majid al-Rafei until his death in July 2017. It is the Lebanese regional branch of the Iraqi-led Ba'ath Party. The party held its second congress in October 2011. Founders of the party included Dr. Abd al-Majid al-Rafe'ii, Jihad George Karam, Rafiq Naseeb al-Faqih, Rashid Abo Falah,Karam Mohamed al-Sahili, Hani Mohammad Sho'aib, Ammar Mohammad Shibli, Hassan Khalil Gharib and Wassef El Harakeh. Although formally affiliated to the Sunni-dominated regime in Baghdad, the majority of the party's members were Lebanese Shiites.

The existence of the Lebanese branch of the Iraqi-led Ba'ath Party has much longer roots than its Syrian-led counterpart. Following the 1966 split in the Ba'ath Party between Iraqi and Syrian-dominated factions, the pro-Iraqi party was led by Abd al-Majid Rafei.

At first, the pro-Iraqi party and the pro-Syrian party worked side-by-side in the Lebanese National Movement (also known as the National Front), but with tension increasing between them, the two parties were on a war footing. The party was active in 1960s demonstrations, and al-Rafei was detained by Lebanese authorities for his political activities. However, he was a candidate from Tripoli in the 1968 general election. The party expanded during the first half of the 1970s, and in the 1972 general election al-Rafi was elected to parliament from Tripoli. Ali al-Khalil, a former member, was elected from Tyre. The party was active in Southern Lebanon. In Nabatieh it was headed by Hani Mohammad Shoaib. The party was built with generous aid from Iraq.

== Military structure and organization ==
Socialist Arab Lebanon Vanguard Party حزب طليعة لبنان العربي الاشتراكي
- Leaders: Abd al-Majid al-Rafei; Tahsein al-Atrash
- Dates active: 1975-1991
- Headquarters: West Beirut
- Active regions: Lebanon
- Size: 2,000 men
- Part of: Lebanese National Movement
- Wars: Lebanese Civil War

== Lebanese Civil War ==
During the Lebanese Civil War, the Lebanese parliament formed the National Dialogue Committee in 1975. Assem Qanso of the pro-Syrian party became a member, but no figures from the pro-Iraqi Ba'ath Party were given a seat on the committee. The party was a member of the Lebanese National Movement, a political alliance led by Kamal Jumblatt of the Progressive Socialist Party, and had an organized a militia of around 2000 armed men that received its funding and weapons by Iraq.

The party was a big critic of both Syria's and Israel's invasions of Lebanon. The party supported the Lebanese Arab identity and wanted an Arab state. It was a main factor in the battle of the hotels and Israels invasions of Lebanon 1978 and 1982.

Following the execution of Muhammad Baqir al-Sadr by Saddam Hussein in April 1980, the party came into conflict with the Amal Movement, which culminated in tit-for-tat assassinations and clashes in Shia majority suburbs of Dahieh until late 1981. In November 1981, Tahsein al-Atrash, leader of the Ba'ath branch at the time, was shot dead.

== See also ==
- Arab Socialist Ba'ath Party – Lebanon Region
- Lebanese Civil War
- Lebanese National Movement

== Sources ==
- Sassoon, Joseph (2012). Saddam Hussein's Ba'th Party: Inside an Authoritarian Regime (1st ed.). Cambridge University Press. ISBN 978-0-521-14915-0.
- Tom Najem and Roy C. Amore, Historical Dictionary of Lebanon, Second Edition, Historical Dictionaries of Asia, Oceania, and the Middle East, Rowman & Littlefield Publishers, Lanham, Boulder, New York & London 2021. ISBN 9781538120439, 1538120437
