= Regional Command of the Arab Socialist Ba'ath Party – Iraq Region =

Highest organ of the Iraqi Ba'athist party

The Regional Command of the Arab Socialist Ba'ath Party – Iraq Region, officially the Regional Command of the Iraqi Regional Branch of the Arab Socialist Ba'ath Party, was the highest decision-making organ of the Ba'ath Party organization in Iraq. The Regional Command has normally had 19–21 members throughout its history. When in power, the Directorate of Security Affairs was responsible for the security of the president and the senior members of the Regional Command.

The Iraqi Regional Branch was organized on the Marxist–Leninist model, with a small elite, the Regional Command, controlling the party from the top down. As in the Soviet Union, the party leadership became the government. While the Regional Command was the de facto highest legislative and executive organ of state and party, the Revolutionary Command Council was according to the 1970 Constitution of Iraq "the supreme body of the state." In theory, the Regional Command was to be subordinate to the National Command.

== Heads ==
Secretary of the Regional Command

No.	Portrait	Name (Lifespan)	Tenure		
No.	Portrait	Name (Lifespan)	Took office	Left office	Duration
1		Fuad al-Rikabi فؤاد الركابي (1932–1971)	1954	29 November 1959	5 years
2		Talib El-Shibib طالب الشبيب (1934–1997)	2 February 1960	May 1962	2 years, 2 months
3		Ali Salih al-Sa'di علي صالح السعدي (1928–1977)	May 1962	25 September 1963	1 year, 4 months
4		Hamdi Abd al-Majid حمدي عبد المجيد	25 September 1963	11 November 1963	47 days
5		Ahmed Hassan al-Bakr أحمد حسن البكر (1914–1982)	11 November 1963	February 1964	2 months
6		Saddam Hussein صدام حسين (1937–2006)	February 1964	October 1966	2 years, 8 months
(5)		Ahmed Hassan al-Bakr أحمد حسن البكر (1914–1982)	October 1966	16 July 1979	12 years, 9 months
(6)		Saddam Hussein صدام حسين (1937–2006)	16 July 1979	30 December 2006 (executed)	27 years, 167 days
7		Izzat Ibrahim al-Douri عزت إبراهيم الدوري (1942–2020)	3 January 2007	26 October 2020 #	13 years, 297 days
8		Mohammed Younis al-Ahmed محمد يونس الاحمد (born 1949) (Note: In opposition to al-Douri until 2020.)	3 January 2007	Incumbent	19 years, 255 days

Deputy Secretary of the Regional Command

No.	Portrait	Name (Lifespan)	Tenure		
No.	Portrait	Name (Lifespan)	Took office	Left office	Duration
Unknown (pre–1966)
1		Saddam Hussein صدام حسين (1937–2006)	October 1966	16 July 1979	12 years, 9 months
2		Taha Yassin Ramadan طه ياسين رمضان (1938–2007)	16 July 1979	September 1991	12 years, 1 month
3		Izzat Ibrahim al-Douri عزت إبراهيم الدوري (1942–2020)	September 1991	3 January 2007	15 years, 4 months
Unknown (2007–present)

=== Timeline ===
Secretary of the Regional Command

Deputy Secretary of the Regional Command

== Members ==
Members of the 1st–12th Regional Commands
Name	Took office	Left office	Term(s)	Duration
Fuad al-Rikabi	December 1955	29 November 1959	2	364 days
Shams al-Din Kazim	December 1955	1957	1	31 days
Faysal Habib Khayzaran	December 1955	1957	1	31 days
Faysal Habib Khayzaran	2 February 1960	May 1962	2	2 years, 88 days
Khalid Ali Salih al-Dulaymi	1957	July 1960	2	3 years, 182 days
Midhat Ibrahim Jumah	1957	29 November 1959	1	2 years, 332 days
Abdallah Rikabi	1957	29 November 1959	1	2 years, 332 days
Talib El-Shibib	1957	25 September 1963	4	6 years, 267 days
Talib El-Shibib	11 November 1963	February 1964	1	82 days
Karim Mahmud Shantaf	1957	29 November 1959	1	2 years, 332 days
Karim Mahmud Shantaf	11 November 1963	February 1964	1	82 days
Ayyad Said Thabit	1957	29 November 1959	1	2 years, 332 days
Ali Salih al-Sadi	2 February 1960	11 November 1963	4	3 years, 282 days
Sa'dun Hammadi	2 February 1960	25 September 1963	1	3 years, 235 days
Sa'dun Hammadi	June 1982	September 1991	1	9 years, 92 days
Sa'dun Hammadi	1994	18 May 2001	1	7 years, 137 days
Hazim Jawad	2 February 1960	February 1964	5	3 years, 364 days
Khalid Ali Salih al-Dulaymi	2 February 1960	July 1960	1	150 days
Hamdi Abd al-Majid	May 1962	11 November 1963	2	1 year, 194 days
Hani Fakiki	May 1962	11 November 1963	2	1 year, 194 days
Hamid Khalkhal	May 1962	11 November 1963	2	1 year, 194 days
Muhsin Shaykh Radi	May 1962	11 November 1963	2	1 year, 194 days
Abu Talib al-Hashimi	25 September 1963	11 November 1963	1	47 days
Adnan Qassab	25 September 1963	11 November 1963	1	47 days
Ahmed Hassan al-Bakr	11 November 1963	16 July 1979	5	15 years, 247 days
Abd al-Sattar Abd al-Latif	11 November 1963	February 1964	1	82 days
Muhammad Mihdawi	11 November 1963	February 1964	1	82 days
Salih Mahdi Ammash	11 November 1963	September 1971年	1	7 years, 294 days
Mundhir Wandawi	11 November 1963	February 1964	1	82 days
Tahir Yahya	11 November 1963	February 1964	1	82 days
Ali Abd al-Karim	11 November 1963	February 1964	1	82 days
Faiq Bazzaz	11 November 1963	February 1964	1	82 days
Tariq Aziz	1 August 1965	9 April 2003	9	37 years, 251 days
Abd al-Sattar Duri	11 November 1963	February 1964	1	82 days
Fuad Shakir Mustafa	11 November 1963	February 1964	1	82 days
Karim Mahmud Shantaf	11 November 1963	1967	1	3 years, 51 days
Salim Sultan	11 November 1963	February 1964	1	82 days
Hassan Hajj Waddai	11 November 1963	February 1964	1	82 days
Saddam Hussein	February 1964	9 April 2003	8	39 years, 67 days
Ahmad Taha Azzuz	February 1964	October 1965	3	2 years, 242 days
Mohammed Mahjoub al-Douri	February 1964	October 1966	3	2 years, 242 days
Mohammed Mahjoub al-Douri	January 1974	16 July 1979	1	5 years, 196 days
Abdullah Sallum al-Samarra'i	February 1964	March 1970	3	6 years, 28 days
Abd al-Khaliq al-Samarra'i	February 1964	1973	3	8 years, 335 days
Hardan al-Tikriti	February 1964	October 1966	1	2 years, 242 days
Abd al-Karim al-Shaykhli	October 1966	1971	2	4 years, 92 days
Murtada al-Hadithi	October 1966	January 1974	2	7 years, 92 days
Taha Yassin Ramadan	October 1966	9 April 2003	8	36 years, 190 days
Salah Omar al-Ali	October 1966	1970	2	3 years, 92 days
Izzat Mustafa	October 1966	November 1968	1	2 years, 31 days
Izzat Ibrahim ad-Douri	November 1966	9 April 2003		36 years, 190 days
Samir Abdul Aziz al-Najim	November 1968	1971	2	2 years, 92 days
Abd al-Wahhab Karim	November 1968	September 1969	1	335 days
Tayih 'Abd al-Karim	January 1974	June 1982	2	8 years, 151 days
Adnan al-Hamdani	January 1974	16 July 1979	1	5 years, 196 days
Ghanim 'Abd al-Jalil	January 1974	16 July 1979	1	5 years, 196 days
Izzat Mustafa	January 1974	January–March 1977	1	3 years, 59 days
Fulayyih Hasan Jasim	January 1974	March 1977	1	3 years, 59 days
Abdullah Fadhil Samarra'i	January 1974	16 July 1979	1	5 years, 196 days
Muhammad Ayish Hamad	January 1974	16 July 1979	1	5 years, 196 days
Muhyi Abdul-Hussein Mashhadi	January 1974	16 July 1979	1	5 years, 196 days
Tahir al-Ani	January 1974	September 1982	2	8 years, 151 days
Abd al-Fattah al-Yasin	January 1974	September 1982	2	8 years, 151 days
Ja'far Qasim Hammudi	January 1974	June 1982	2	8 years, 151 days
Hikmat Ibrahim al-Azzawi	January 1974	June 1982	2	8 years, 151 days
Burhan Mustafa	January 1974	June 1982	2	8 years, 151 days
Adnan Khairallah	January 1974	4 May 1989	3	15 years, 123 days
Na'im Haddad	January 1974	September 1991	3	17 years, 243 days
Hasan Ali	January 1974	September 1991	3	17 years, 243 days
Sa'dun Shakir	January 1974	September 1991	3	17 years, 243 days
Sahdi Mahdi Salih	June 1982	1994	2	11 years, 214 days
Mohammed Hamza Zubeidi	June 1982	September 1991	1	9 years, 92 days
Samir Muhammad Abd al-Wahhab	June 1982	September 1991	1	9 years, 92 days
Abd al-Hasan Rahi Majhul al-Firawn	June 1982	September 1991	1	9 years, 92 days
Abd al-Ghanii Abd al-Ghafur	June 1982	18 May 2001	3	18 years, 351 days
Kamil Yasin Rashid	June 1982	18 May 2001	3	18 years, 351 days
Mizban Khadr al-Hadi	June 1982	9 April 2003	4	20 years, 312 days
Ali Hassan al-Majid	June 1982	9 April 2003	4	20 years, 312 days
Latif Nusayyif Jasim	June 1982	September 1991	1	9 years, 92 days
Latif Nusayyif Jasim	1994	9 April 2003	2	9 years, 98 days
Khadar Abd al-Aziz Hussein	September 1991	1994	1	2 years, 122 days
Ahmad Abd al-Rahman	September 1991	1994	1	2 years, 122 days
Nuri Faysal Shahir	September 1991	1994	1	2 years, 122 days
Mizhir Matni al-Awwad	September 1991	1994	1	2 years, 122 days
Fawzi Khalaf	September 1991	1994	1	2 years, 122 days
Mohammed Hamza Zubeidi	September 1991	18 May 2001	2	9 years, 259 days
Muhammad al-Ahmad	September 1991	18 May 2001	2	9 years, 259 days
Muhammad Zimam Abd al-Razzaq	September 1991	9 April 2003	3	11 years, 220 days
Abd Al-Baqi Abd Karim Al-Sadun	1994	18 May 2001	1	7 years, 137 days
Fadil Ibrahim al-Mashadani	1994	18 May 2001	1	7 years, 137 days
Samir Abdul Aziz al-Najim	1994	9 April 2003	1	7 years, 98 days
Aziz Abdullah	1994	9 April 2003	2	7 years, 120 days
Aziz Saleh Nuhmah	1994	9 April 2003	2	7 years, 120 days
Qusay Hussein	18 May 2001	9 April 2003	1	1 year, 326 days
Yahya Abdullah al-Abudi	18 May 2001	9 April 2003	1	1 year, 343 days
Uqlah Abd Saqar	18 May 2001	9 April 2003	1	1 year, 343 days
Rashid Ta'an Kazim	18 May 2001	9 April 2003	1	1 year, 343 days
Fadhil Mahmud Gharib	18 May 2001	9 April 2003	1	1 year, 343 days
Muhsin Khudayr al-Khafaji	18 May 2001	9 April 2003	1	1 year, 343 days
Huda Salih Mahdi Ammash	18 May 2001	9 April 2003	1	1 year, 343 days
