= 1968 Lebanese general election in Tripoli City =

Voting to elect five members of the Lebanese parliament took place in Tripoli City in 1968, part of the national general election of that year (the rural areas of Tripoli District had a separate constituency). Four of the seats of the constituency were earmarked for the Sunni Muslim community, whilst the fifth seat was allocated to the Greek Orthodox community (for more information about the Lebanese election system, see Elections in Lebanon). The Tripoli City constituency had 64,913 eligible voters, out of whom 22,813 voted.

== Candidates ==
Fourteen candidates took part in the election. There were two multi-candidate tickets, with the remaining candidates contesting of individual tickets.

=== Democratic Front ticket ===
The leader of the Parliamentary Democratic Front and former Prime Minister Rashid Karami led a ticket of five incumbent parliamentarians. Karami's cabinet had resigned in February 1968, and an interim administration under Abdallah al-Yafi took over to prepare for the elections.

Karami himself was the first candidate on the list. The other candidates of the Democratic Front were Salim Kabbarah (lawyer by profession, parliamentarian since 1964), Hashim al-Husayni (physician, leader of Movements of Peace Partisans, parliamentarian since 1957), Amin al-Hafiz (economist, professor at Lebanese University, parliamentarian since 1960) and Fuad al-Burt (Greek Orthodox businessman, parliamentarian since 1953).

=== Leftist ticket ===
Karami's ticket was challenged by a left-wing ticket headed by Abd al-Majid ar-Rafi, the leader of the pro-Iraqi Ba'ath Party. Other candidates on the ticket were Umar Bisar (physician, political independent) and M. as-Saydawi (school teacher, said to represent the underground Lebanese Communist Party). The leftist ticket accused Karami of being a representative of Lebanese capitalism. They also used the campaign to highlight the issue of Palestine, calling for its liberation.

== Results ==
All the candidates of the Democratic Front ticket were re-elected.

| Candidate | Votes |
|---|---|
| Rashid Karami | 18,194 |
| Hashim al-Husayni | 16,328 |
| Fuad al-Burt | 16,289 |
| Amin al-Hafiz | 16,243 |
| Salim Kabbarah | 15,201 |
| Abd al-Majid ar-Rafi | 13,008 |
| Umar Bissar | 10,805 |
| M. as-Saydawi | 10,695 |
| Maurice Fadil | 9,039 |
| Faruq al-Muqaddam | 5,810 |
| Sa'd Allah Shaban | 2,218 |
| Abdallah Bissar | 1,365 |
| Ahmad Najjat Hajir | 588 |
| Muhammad al-Ghandur | 270 |
