= Abd al-Majid al-Rafei =

Lebanese politician

Abd al-Majid al-Rafei (in Arabic عبد المجيد الرافعي; 11 April 1927 – 12 July 2017), born in Tripoli, Lebanon, was a Lebanese politician and member of the Lebanese Parliament. He was at one time the head of the Iraqi faction of the historical Ba'ath Arab Socialist Party and its Iraqi wing. Later, until his death in July 2017, he was the head of the Socialist Arab Lebanon Vanguard Party.

== Biography ==
He was born Abdel Majid Mohamed Tayeb Rafei on 11 April 1927 in a family in Tripoli, Lebanon which was pre-occupied by Arab nationalist ideas. During the French Mandate of Lebanon, in May 1941, Al-Rafei demonstrated in support of the Iraqi nationalist officers uprising against the British Mandate in Iraq. In 1943, he also demonstrated in Tripoli in support of Lebanese independence from French rule with one of his closest friends being killed in the demonstrations and another friend, Amin Hajar being injured by French bullets.

After Lebanese Independence, he studied medicine in University of Lausanne, Switzerland and practiced medicine in the 1950s in Tripoli. In 1957 he attended a general Baath gathering and became an official member and one of the highest figures in the unified Baath Arab Socialist Party in Lebanon. With the split of the party between the pro-Iraqi Ba'ath branch and the pro-Syrian Ba'ath branch, both factions initially became part of the National Front against the rule of President of the Republic Camille Chamoun in the 1958 Civil War.

With tensions increasing between the two factions, the two Baathist parties of Lebanon were on a war footing. The party was active in 1960s demonstrations, and al-Rafei was detained by Lebanese authorities for his political activities during the rule of President Fuad Chehab.

In 1968, he was a candidate for Tripoli election district in the 1968 general election. The party expanded during the first half of the 1970s, and in the 1972 general election was elected to the Lebanese parliament from Tripoli, bringing in 543 higher votes than the career politician and Lebanese Prime Minister for several times Rashid Karami. With continuous extensions of the Lebanese Parliament because of impossibility of conducting Parliamentary elections because of the Lebanese Civil War and its repercussions, he retained his seat until 1989 with the Taif Agreement and the ensuing general elections in the country.

During the Syrian hegemony of Lebanon, the Iraqi branch of the Baath party headed by Abd al-Majid al-Rafei came under increasing pressure by the Syrian rulers and its activities greatly curtailed. In 1983, after the ouster of Yasser Arafat and his supporters from Tripoli, in a campaign organized by the Syrian government and pro-Syrian political groupings in Lebanon and pro-Syrian Palestinian factions, al-Rafei, one of the biggest anti-Syrian figureheads in Tripoli and the General Secretary of the pro-Iraqi Baathist Party - Lebanon went into voluntary exile to Iraq.

After the Iraqi government of Saddam Hussein was toppled in 2003 by the Western Coalition forces, al-Rafei returned to Lebanon with tacit agreement of the Syrian government and pro-Syrian political parties on certain political restrictions of no plans for relaunching of the Iraqi faction in Lebanon.

After the assassination of former prime minister Rafic Hariri and the ensuing Cedar Revolution and the withdrawal of the Syrian forces, the Iraqi faction has been reorganized as Hizb Al-Taliyeh Lubnan Al-'Arabi Al-Ishtiraki (in Arabic حزب طليعة لبنان العربي الاشتراكي known in English as Socialist Arab Lebanon Vanguard Party).

Al-Rafei died on 12 July 2017.
