= 1950 Jordanian general election =

General elections were held in Jordan on 11 April 1950. For the first time, West Bank Palestinians were able to vote. The 40 representatives of the new Parliament were divided equally, with 20 each from the east and west sides of the Jordan River.

As political parties were banned at the time, all candidates ran as independents, although some were affiliated with the Liberal Party, the Jordanian Communist Party, the Ba'ath Party the Arab Constitutional Party and the Umma Party.
