= Arab Socialist Ba'ath Party of Algeria =

Political party in Algeria

Arab Socialist Ba'ath Party of Algeria حزب البعث العربي الاشتراكي في الجزائر Parti Baath arabe socialiste d'Algérie
- Leader: Ahmed Choutri
- Founded: 1988
- Headquarters: Algiers, Algeria
- Ideology: Ba'athism; Saddamism; Pan-Arabism; Arab nationalism
- International affiliation: Ba'ath Party (Iraqi-dominated faction)
- Colors: Black, Red, White and Green
- People's National Assembly: 0 / 462
- Council of the Nation: 0 / 144

Party flag

The Arab Socialist Ba'ath Party of Algeria (French: Parti Baath arabe socialiste d'Algérie, Arabic: حزب البعث العربي الاشتراكي في الجزائر Hizb Al-Ba'ath Al-Arabi Al-Ishtiraki fy Aljeza'ir), is a political party in Algeria. It is the Algerian regional branch of the Iraqi-led Ba'ath Party. It is led by Ahmed Choutri.

The party is currently banned, and Choutri was forced to flee to Iraq during the 1990s because of governmental repression against the Algerian Ba'ath movement. The party sympathised with the Iraqi ba'athist insurgency and supported Izzat Ibrahim al-Douri, leader of the Iraqi branch. Following his return to Algeria in 2003, Choutri wrote The Baathist Faith of President Saddam.
