= Arab Socialist Revolutionary Ba'ath Party =

- Founder: Abdullah Rimawi
- Founded: May 19, 1960
- Split from: Ba'ath Party
- Ideology: Ba'athism

The Arab Socialist Revolutionary Ba'ath Party was a Ba'athist political party, a splinter group from the Ba'ath Party. The party was led by Abdullah Rimawi and sponsored by the United Arab Republic.

Rimawi had been the secretary-general of the Jordanian branch of the Ba'ath Party and a member of the National Command of the party. At the August 27-September 1, 1959 Beirut Ba'ath Party convention Rimawi was deposed, accused of disruptions in the party. On September 6, 1959, Rimawi and Abu Gharbiyah (a Jordanian Ba'athist leader, exiled in Damascus) rebuffed the accusations and labelled the decisions of the Beirut convention as illegitimate. On May 19, 1960, the Rimawi faction issued a statement, claiming that a convention with participation from across the Arab world (except the United Arab Republic) had assembled in Damascus and elected a Temporary Command consisting of Rimawi, Abu Gharbiyah, Sulayman al-Hadidi, Shaykhun Habusi and Hafiz Abd al-Hadi. All were Jordanians living in exile in Damascus. In August 1960, the Rimawi group stated that a 'National Revolutionary Command' had been elected and a new party programme formulated at a second party convention. No names were published of the new party leadership, though. On August 28, 1960, the party issued a statement hailing the United Arab Republic as the bastion of Arab nationalism, condemning the rulers of Jordan and Iraq. The Revolutionary Ba'ath Party accused the Ba'ath Party (or 'Aflaqites' in their discourse) for deviations from Arab nationalist ideology.

On July 17, 1961, a group of Rimawi followers opened fire on Ba'ath Party members in Tripoli. No one was killed in the incident.
