= Ba'ath Party =

Syrian political party (1947–1966)

Arab Socialist Ba'ath Party حزب البعث العربي الاشتراكي
- Secretary-General: Michel Aflaq (1954–65); Munif Razzaz (1965–66)
- Founders: Michel Aflaq; Salah al-Din al-Bitar
- Founded: 7 April 1947
- Dissolved: 1966 (as a unified party)
- Merger of: Arab Ba'ath; Arab Ba'ath Movement; Arab Socialist Movement
- Succeeded by: Arab Socialist Ba'ath Party – Iraq Region and Ba'ath Party (Iraqi-dominated faction) Arab Socialist Ba'ath Party – Syria Region and Ba'ath Party (Syrian-dominated faction)
- Newspaper: Al-Ba'ath
- Ideology: Ba'athism; Arab nationalism; Arab socialism; Pan-Arabism; Anti-Zionism; Revolutionary socialism; Left-wing nationalism; Anti-imperialism; Secularism
- Political position: Left-wing
- Colors: Black White Green; Red (Pan-Arab colors)
- Slogan: "Unity, Freedom, Socialism" "Long Live The Arabs" "A single Arab nation with an eternal mission"

Party flag

The Arab Socialist Ba'ath Party (Arabic: حزب البعث العربي الاشتراكي Ḥizb al-Baʿth al-ʿArabī al-Ishtirākī [ˈħɪzb alˈbaʕθ alˈʕarabiː alɪʃtɪˈraːkiː]), also known simply as the Baʽath Party (Arabic: حزب البعث, lit. 'resurrection party'), was a political party founded in Syria by Michel Aflaq, Salah al-Din al-Bitar, and associates of Zaki al-Arsuzi. The party espoused Ba'athism—an ideology mixing Arab nationalist, pan-Arab, Arab socialist, and anti-imperialist interests. Ba'athism calls for the unification of the Arab world into a single united state. Its motto, "Unity, Freedom, Socialism", refers to Arab unity and freedom from foreign control and interference as well as supporting socialism.

The party was founded by the merger of the Arab Ba'ath Movement, led by Aflaq and al-Bitar, and the Arab Ba'ath, led by al-ʾArsūzī, on 7 April 1947 as the Arab Ba'ath Party. The party quickly established branches in other Arab countries - although it would only hold power in Iraq and Syria. In 1953, the Arab Ba'ath Party merged with the Arab Socialist Movement, led by Akram al-Hourani, to form the Arab Socialist Ba'ath Party. The newly formed party was a relative success, and it became the second-largest party in the Syrian parliament in the 1954 election. This, coupled with the increasing strength of the Syrian Communist Party, led to the establishment of the United Arab Republic (UAR), a union made up of Egypt and Syria, in 1958. The UAR would prove unsuccessful, and was dissolved following the 1961 Syrian coup d'état.

Following the break-up of the UAR, the Ba'ath Party was reconstituted. However, during the UAR period, military activists had established the Military Committee that took control of the Ba'ath Party away from civilian hands. In the meantime, in Iraq, the local Ba'ath Party branch had taken power by orchestrating and leading the Ramadan Revolution, only to lose power a couple of months later. The Military Committee, with Aflaq's consent, took power in Syria in the 1963 Syrian coup d'état.

A power struggle quickly developed between the civilian faction led by Aflaq, al-Bitar, and Munīf ar-Razzāz and the Military Committee led by Salah Jadid and Hafez al-Assad. As relations between the two factions deteriorated, the Military Committee initiated the 1966 Syrian coup d'état, which ousted the National Command led by al-Razzāz, Aflaq, and their supporters. The 1966 coup split the Ba'ath Party between the Iraqi-dominated Ba'ath Party and the Syrian-dominated Ba'ath Party. There are currently no Ba’athist run countries after the fall of the Ba’ath regime in Syria on 8 December 2024.

== History ==
The party was founded on 7 April 1947 as the Arab Ba'ath Party by Michel Aflaq (an Antiochian Orthodox Christian), Salah al-Din al-Bitar (a Sunni Muslim), and the followers of Zaki al-Arsuzi (an Alawite who later became an atheist) in Damascus, Syria, leading to the establishment of the Syrian Regional Branch. Other regional branches were established throughout the Arab world in the later 1940s and early 1950s, in, among others, Iraq, Yemen and Jordan. Throughout its existence, the National Command (the body responsible for all-Arab affairs) gave most attention to Syrian affairs. The 2nd National Congress was convened in June 1954 and elected a seven-man National Command; Aflaq, Bitar, and Akram al-Hourani were elected and represented the Syrian Regional Branch, while Abdullah Rimawi and Abdallah Na'was were elected to represent the Jordanian Branch. The 1954 congress is notable for sanctioning the merger of the Arab Socialist Movement and the Ba'ath Party, which took place supposedly in January 1953, with the newly merged party resuming publications under the name the Arab Socialist Ba'ath Party after 8 April 1954.

The Syrian Regional Branch rose to prominence in the 1940s and 1950s; in the 1954 parliamentary elections the Syrian Regional Branch won 22 seats in parliament, becoming the second largest party in the country. 90 percent of Ba'ath Party members who stood for elections were elected to parliament. The failure of the traditional parties, represented by the People's Party and the National Party, strengthened the Ba'ath Party's public credibility. Through this position, the party was able to get two of its members into the cabinet; Bitar was appointed Minister of Foreign Affairs and Khalil Kallas became Minister of Economics. Its new, strengthened position was used successfully to garner support for Syria's merger with Gamal Abdel Nasser's Egypt, which led to the establishment of the United Arab Republic (UAR) in 1958.

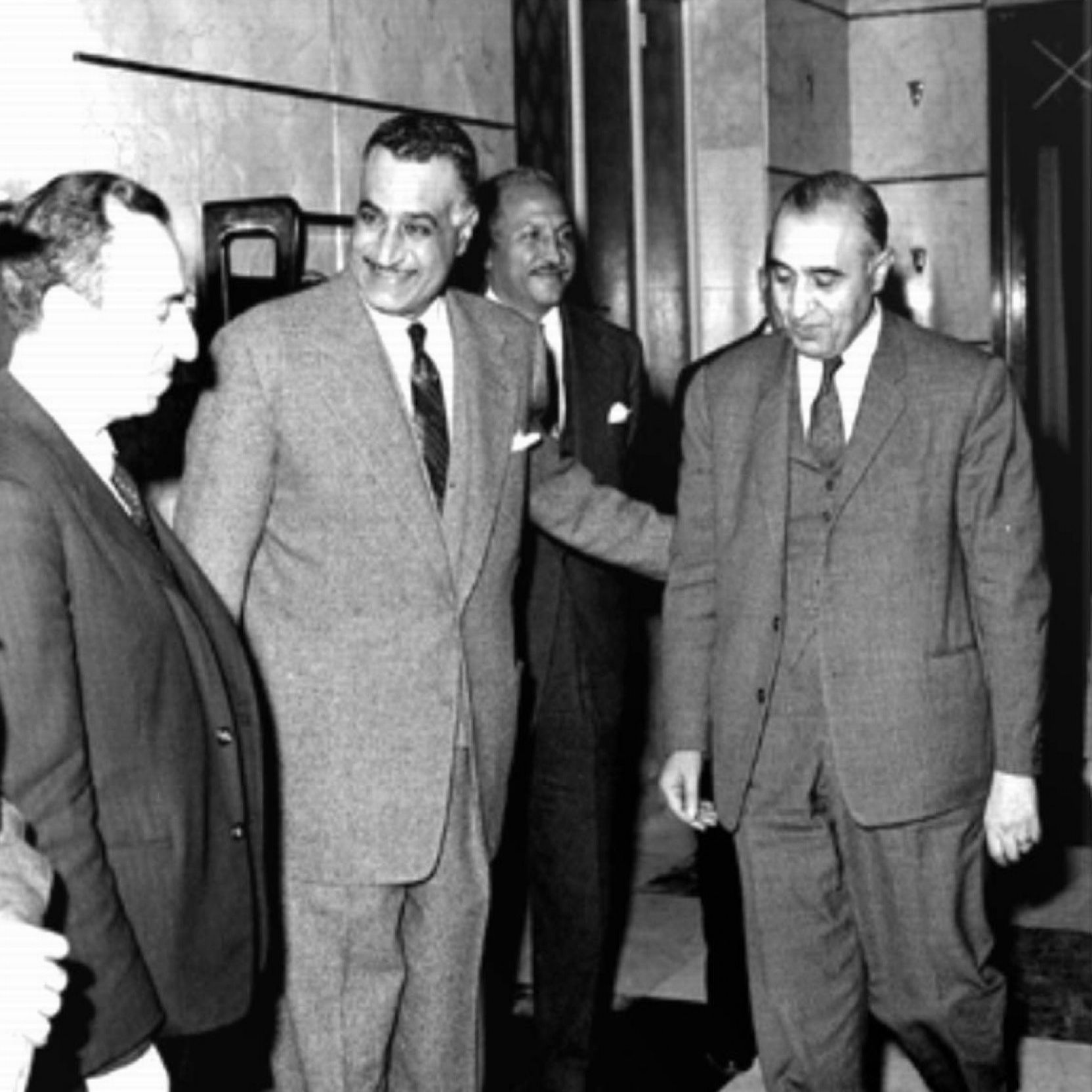
Michel Aflaq (left) and Salah al-Din Bitar (right) with Egyptian President Gamal Abdel Nasser (centre) in 1958. The three leaders were prime advocates for a pan-Arab union

On 24 June 1959, Fuad al-Rikabi, the Regional Secretary of the Iraqi Regional Branch, accused the National Command of betraying Arab nationalist principles by conspiring against the UAR. In light of these criticisms, the Ba'ath convened the 3rd National Congress, held 27 August–1 September 1959, attended by delegates from Iraq, Lebanon, Jordan, South Arabia, the Gulf, "Arab South", "Arab Maghreb", Palestine, and Party student organisations in Arab and other universities. The congress is notable for endorsing the dissolution of the Syrian Regional Branch, which had been decided by Aflaq and Bitar without inner-party consultation in 1958, and for expelling Rimawi, the Regional Secretary of the Jordanian Regional Branch. Rimawi reacted to his expulsion by forming his own party, the Arab Socialist Revolutionary Ba'ath Party, which established a rival National Command to compete with the original. The National Command responded to the problems in Iraq by appointing a Temporary Regional Command on 2 February 1960, which appointed Talib El-Shibib as Regional Secretary, and on 15 June 1961 the National Command expelled Rikabi from the party.

In Iraq, the Iraqi Regional Branch had supported Abdul-Karim Qasim's seizure of power and its ensuing abolishment of the Iraqi Monarchy. The Iraqi Ba'athists supported Qasim on the grounds that they believed he would enter Iraq into the UAR, enlarging the Arab nationalist republic. However, this was proven to be a ruse, and after taking power, Qasim launched an Iraq first policy. In retaliation, the Ba'ath Party tried to assassinate Qasim in February 1959, but the operation, involving a young Saddam Hussein, failed. Qasim was overthrown in the Ramadan Revolution led by young Ba'athist officer Ahmed Hassan al-Bakr; long suspected to be supported by the American Central Intelligence Agency (CIA), however pertinent contemporary documents relating to the CIA's operations in Iraq have remained classified by the U.S. government, although the Iraqi Ba'athists are documented to have maintained supportive relationships with U.S. officials before, during, and after the coup. The Iraqi Regional Branch, when it took power, was so riven by factionalism that its purported allies launched a counter-coup forcing them out of power in November 1963.

The 4th National Congress, held in August 1960, criticized the leadership of Aflaq and Bitar, called for the reestablishment of the Syrian Regional Branch and deemphasized the party's commitment to Arab nationalism while emphasizing more the socialist character of the party. A year later, during the UAR's nadir in Syria, the Syrian General Abdul Karim al-Nahlawi launched a coup on 28 September 1961, which led to the reestablishment of the Syrian Arab Republic.

=== Rule in Syria, infighting, the 1966 coup and split: 1963–1966 ===
The challenges of building a Ba'athist state led to considerable ideological discussion and internal struggle within the party. The Iraqi Regional Branch was increasingly dominated by self-described Marxist Ali Salih al-Sa'di. Al-Sa'di was supported in his ideological reorientation by Hammud al-Shufi, the Regional Secretary of the Syrian Regional Branch; Yasin al-Hafiz, one of the party's few ideological theorists; and by certain members of the secret Military Committee. The Marxist wing gained new ground at the 6th National Congress (held in October 1963), in which the Iraqi and Syrian regional branches called for the establishment of "socialist planning", "collective farms run by peasants", "workers' democratic control of the means of production", and other demands reflecting a certain emulation of Soviet-style socialism. Aflaq, angry at this transformation of his party, retained a nominal leadership role, but the National Command as a whole came under the control of the radicals.

In 1963, the Ba'ath Party seized power in Syria, and from then on the Ba'ath functioned as the only officially recognized Syrian political party, but factionalism and splintering within the party led to a succession of varying governments and new constitutions. On 23 February 1966, a coup d'état led by Salah Jadid, the informal head of the Military Committee, overthrew Aflaq and Bitar's cabinet. The coup sprung out of factional rivalry between Jadid's "regionalist" (qutri) camp, which promoted ambitions for a Greater Syria, and the more traditionally pan-Arab faction then in power, the "nationalist" (qawmi) faction. Jadid's supporters were considered to have been more left-wing then Aflaq and his peers. Several of Jadid's opponents managed to make their escape, and they fled to Beirut, Lebanon. Jadid moved the party in a more radical direction. Although he and his supporters had not signed onto the victorious far-left line at the 6th Party Congress, they had now moved to adopt its positions. The moderate faction, formerly led by Aflaq and al-Bitar, were purged from the party.

While it took some years, the 1966 coup resulted in the creation of two competing National Commands, one Syrian-dominated and another Iraqi-dominated. However, both in Iraq and Syria, the Regional Command became the real centre of party power, and the membership of the National Command became a largely honorary position, often the destination of figures being eased out of the leadership. One consequence of the split was that Zaki al-Arsuzi took Aflaq's place as the official father of Ba'athist thought in the pro-Syrian Ba'ath movement, while the pro-Iraqi Ba'ath movement still considered Aflaq the de jure father of Ba'athist thought.

== Organization ==
The organizational structure of the Ba'ath Party was created at the 2nd National Congress (1954) by amending the party's Internal Regulations (An-Nidhāmu-d-Dākhilī), which had been previously approved at the party's 1st National Congress (1947). The organizational structure ran from top to bottom, and members were forbidden to initiate contacts between groups on the same level of the organisation, i.e., all contacts had to pass through a higher command level.

=== National organization ===
The National Command was the ruling organ of the party between sessions of the National Congress and was headed by a Secretary-General. Between National Congresses, the National Command was held accountable by the National Consultative Council (Arabic: al-majlis al-istishari al-qawmi). The National Consultative Council was a forum made up of representatives from the party's regional branches. However, the number of National Consultative Council members was decided by the size of the regional branch. The National Congress elected the National Command, National Tribunal, the party's discipline body, and the Secretary-General, the party leader. The congress delegates determined the party's policies and procedures.

Before 1954, the party was ruled by the Executive Committee, but this organ, along with others, too, was replaced at the 2nd National Congress in 1954. In Ba'athist jargon, "Nation" means the Arab Nation, because of that, the National Command formed the highest policy-making and coordinating council for the Ba'ath movement throughout the Arab world. The National Command had several bureaus, similar to those of the Regional Command. National Command sessions were held monthly. Of these, the National Liaisons Office was responsible for maintaining contact with the party's Regional Branches.

=== Regional organization ===
A "region" (quṭr), in Ba'athist parlance, is an Arab state, e.g., Syria, Iraq, or Lebanon. Use of the term region reflected the Party's refusal to acknowledge these countries as separate nation-states. The Regional Congress, which combined all the provincial branches, was the region's highest authority and elected a Regional Command, the party leadership in a specific region; the Regional Tribunal, the body responsible for discipline inspection; and a Regional Secretary, the regional party leader. The Regional Congress was made of delegates from the provincial branches; other members attended, but as observers. The Regional Congress was responsible for evaluating the party's performance since the last Regional Congress, while at the same time formulating new policies for the next period, which would last until the next Regional Congress was held. How long this period lasted was decided by the Regional Command. The Regional Command, similar to the Branch Command, operated through bureaus and met for weekly-sessions.

Below the Regional Commands were branches. The branch came above the sub-branch; it comprised at least two to five sub-branches and operated at the provincial level. The branch held a congress periodically in which it elected a Command and a Secretary (leader). The Command operated through bureaus, such as the Workers Bureau and the Bureau of the Secretariat. The sub-branch level constituted three to five sections "and was the lowest level of the party to hold a periodical Congress." Some sub-branches were independent of central authority and elected their own Command and secretaries, while other sub-branches were incorporated into the branches. In the latter case, the sub-branch secretary would be appointed by the superior branch.

A section, which comprised from two to five divisions, functioned at the level of a large city quarter, a town, or a rural district. It elected its own command, composed of five members, but the sub-branch appointed the command's secretary. Beneath the section were divisions. A division comprised two to seven circles, controlled by a division commander. The lowest level was the circle. It was composed of three to seven members, constituting the basic organizational unit. Such Ba'athist groups occurred throughout the bureaucracy and the military. They functioned as the Party's watchdogs and were an effective form of covert surveillance within a public administration.

The Military Organization was made up of branches similar to those in the Ba'ath's civilian sector. However, unlike the civilian sector, the Military Organization was controlled by a separate Military Bureau and held periodical Military Congresses. The Military Organization and the Civilian Organization converged at the Regional Congress.

=== Membership ===
There existed three types of membership categories in the Ba'ath Party: Active member (Arabic: udw ämil), Apprentice Member (Arabic: udw mutadarrib) and Supporter (Arabic: firqa). An Active member had to attend all formal meetings of his party unit, was given the right to vote in party elections, and could run for party office. In the Syrian Regional Branch, a member had to spend 18 months as a Supporter to be promoted to Apprentice status, and then wait another 18 months to be promoted to Active member status.

== Ideology and policy ==
=== Foundational Ba'ath: 1947–1960 ===
==== Arab Nation ====
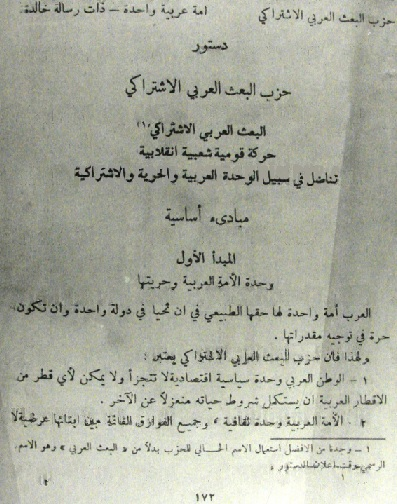
Part of the 1947 Ba'ath Party constitution

For more than 2 decades, Michel Aflaq's essay compilation titled "Fi Sabil al-Ba'ath" (translation: "The Road to Renaissance") was the primary ideological book of the Ba'ath party. The work was published by Aflaq in 1940. From its very beginning, the party was a manifestation of Arab nationalist thought, with the party describing itself as "The Party of Arab Unity". The pan-Arab tendencies of the party's predecessor, the Arab Ba'ath Movement, were strengthened in 1945–1947 by recruiting members from Zaki al-Arsuzi's Arab Ba'ath. The first article of the party's constitution stated that: "...the Arabs form one nation. This nation has the natural right to live in a single state. [As such,] the Arab fatherland constitutes an indivisible political and economic unit. No Arab can live apart from the others."

To express his heartfelt belief in Arab nationalism, Aflaq coined the term "one Arab nation with an eternal message" (Arabic: ummah arabiyyah wahidah thatu risalah khalidah). Party ideology, and Ba'athism in general, was not based on concepts such as the purity of the Arab race or ethnic chauvinism, but on idealistic concepts borrowed from the enlightenment era. According to author Tabitha Petran, the basic tenet of the party's ideology was:

...that the Arab nation is a permanent entity in history. The Arab nation is considered, philosophically speaking, not as a social and economic formation, but as a transcendent fact inspiring different forms, one of its highest contributions taking the form of Islam. It was not Islam that modeled the peoples of Arabia, the Fertile Crescent, and North Africa, equipping them with Islamic values, especially the Arabic language and the Arabic culture, but the Arab nation which created Islam. This conception of the Arab nation implicitly advantages the Arab contribution to history. On the other hand, Arab decadence can be overcome through a purifying and spiritual action, not religious but moral.

==== Peasant and workers ====
The early Ba'ath gave very little attention to the problems facing the peasants and workers. As the historian Hanna Batatu notes, "Aflaq was basically urban in outlook. The peasants never constituted an object of his special concern. In his writing there is scarcely an expression of concentrated interest in the country's husbandsmen." While peasants and the issues they faced are mentioned in some of Aflaq's work, there was scarcely any depth given to them. Aflaq never expressed explicit enmity towards traditional landowners. Issues such as these would only gain prominence when Akram al-Hourani became a leading party figure and when the "transitional Ba'athists" took power. Of the four members in the 1st Executive Committee, Wahib al-Ghanim was the only one who paid much attention to the problems of peasants and workers, as the other members (Aflaq, Salah al-Din al-Bitar and Jalil al-Sayyide) had a middle class upbringing and upheld middle-class values.

The early party organization never cultivated a deep following in rural areas. In fact, at the party's founding congress, only one peasant and one worker were present among the 217 delegates. Most of the delegates were either school teacher or students attending universities. When Akram al-Hourani's Arab Socialist Party (ASP) merged with the Ba'ath Party, the majority of ASP members of peasant origin did not join the Ba'ath Party, instead becoming personal followers of Hawrani. However, the majority of Ba'ath members were of rural upbringing. The "Transitional Ba'ath", which grew out of the dissolution of the Syrian Regional Branch (1958) and the Military Committee, was more rural in outlook, policy and ideology.

==== "Unity, Freedom, Socialism" ====
The slogan "Unity, Freedom, Socialism" is the key tenet in Ba'athist thought. Unity stood for the creation of an independent, strong Arab Nation. Liberty did not mean liberal democracy, but rather freedom from colonial oppression and freedom of speech and thought. Aflaq believed that the Ba'ath Party, at least in theory, would rule, and guide the people, in a transitional period of time without consulting the people, however he did support intra-party democracy. The last tenet, 'socialism', did not mean socialism as defined in the West, but rather a unique form of Arab socialism. According to Ba'athist thought, socialism had originated under the rule of the Prophet Muhammad. The original interpretation of Arab socialism did not answer questions regarding economic equality or how much state control was necessary, but instead focused on freeing the Arab Nation and its people from colonization and oppression in general.

=== Transitional Ba'ath: 1960–1964 ===
==== Regionalists versus nationalists ====
After the failure of the United Arab Republic (UAR), a union of Egypt and Syria, the Ba'ath Party was divided into two main factions, the Regionalists (Arabic: Qutriyyun) and the Nationalists (pan-Arab) (Arabic: Qawmiyyun). When the union with Egypt collapsed, the Ba'ath Party was put in a difficult position, as the party still sought Arab unity but did not oppose the UAR's dissolution and did not want to seek another union with Egypt under Gamal Abdel Nasser's rule. However, being the unionist party that it was, the party's leaders could not state their position on this issue. The end result was that the pro-Arab nationalists within the Ba'ath Party became committed Nasserists, while the more moderate Arab nationalists founded the pro-Nasserite Socialist Unionists party. A third group, led by people disenchanted with both Nasser and the union period, remained in the Ba'ath Party but stopped believing in the feasibility of pan-Arabism. On 21 February 1962, the National Command issued a new policy regarding the pan-Arab project by first mentioning the successes and failures of the UAR, but ending the statement by calling for the reestablishment of the UAR as a decentralized federal union with Nasser's Egypt. Many rank-and-file members opposed this change in policy, with many members being both disenchanted with pan-Arabism and Aflaq's continued party rule.

When the Syrian Regional Branch was reestablished, the majority of its members in the provinces were of communal origins – Druze, Alawi, or Ismaili. The provincial party members had not been told of the Syrian Regional Branch's dissolution, which in fact broke the communication line with provincial branches and the National Command. While it is true that in 1962 the Regionalists supported the slogan adopted at the 5th National Congress, "the renewal of the union with Egypt while taking note of past mistakes", they treated such a slogan as a propaganda slogan rather than a feasible goal.

==== The "Arab road to socialism" ====
The disillusionment felt among party members on the pan-Arab project, led to the radicalization of the party's interpretation of socialism. Yasin al-Hafiz, a former member of the Syrian Communist Party, was an early frontrunner for the party's radicalization. While he didn't oppose the pan-Arab project, he wanted to turn the concept of Arab socialism into a scientific and revolutionary socialist ideology which adapted Marxism to local conditions. Jamal al-Atassi, who had been a moderate socialist for most of his life, called for the renunciation of Arab socialism in 1963 and the adoption of a "virtually Marxist concept of socialism" by claiming that class struggle was the moving force in society.

Hammud al-Shufi became the leader of the party's Marxist faction during his short stint as Syrian Regional Secretary, literally the head of the Syrian Regional Organization. Shufi was able, due to his position as head of the Organization Bureau of the Regional Command, to recruit several Marxist or Marxist-leaning members to the top of the Syrian Regional party hierarchy. Radical socialists led by Ali Salih al-Sadi took control of the Iraqi Regional Branch in 1963, which led to the official radicalization of the party's ideology.

The delegates at the 6th National Congress elected an Ideology Committee that was responsible for writing a charter about the party's ideology. The end result was the document Points of Departure. The document, which was approved by the 6th National Congress, relegated Arab unity to a secondary role and gave socialism prominence. Marxist concepts were used interchangeably alongside Ba'athist ones; however, the document was reluctant in explicitly admitting that certain ideas were of Marxist origins. The 6th National Congress borrowed key Marxist-Leninist tenets such as "people's democracy" and emphasized the need of a socialist vanguard in-order to:

"play the role of mediator and leader (even if it is in power) that acts to direct the journey of the masses towards the socialist future in a scientific way and in a democratic style".

While the Points of Departure didn't create a break with the party's traditional ideology, it criticized the party's old guard for giving Arab unity primacy over socialism and their failure to turn Ba'athism into a comprehensive theory. While the documents says Arab unity is progressive, the reason for it being important changed. The document stated: "Arab unity is an indispensable basis for the construction of a socialist economy." Aflaq also believed that Arab unity was only an intermediate goal, but it stood at the centre of classical Ba'athism. In the Points of Departure, despite not firmly stating it, the goal of creating a socialist society seemed to be both an immediate goal and the main goal of the party.

The concept of Arab socialism, accused of being narrow-minded and nationalistic, was replaced with the "Arab road to socialism" concept. The Points of Departure criticized the classical Ba'athist view regarding private ownership. Classical Ba'athists supported private ownership as a way to recruit into the party many petty bourgeois elements. The document called for nationalization of the commanding heights of the economy, the slow incorporation of the petty bourgeoisie into the socialist economy and the elimination of the national bourgeoisie and its allied classes. To safeguard the party from evolving into one supporting state capitalism, the socialist economy would be controlled by a vanguard party together with popular participation from the toiler masses. Major policies in the "Arab road to socialism" included:

The nationalization of the major branches of the economy with the participation of the toiling masses in the management of the economy, and for the creation of collective farms to effect the revolution necessary for the peasants...the Congress stipulated that the changes be directed by a "revolutionary vanguard", the final aim being to establish a "popular democracy" that was to guarantee freedom to the classes which constitute the true people and ensure the country's rapid development. This regime was to center on the party, leading the popular organizations and councils and operating according to the principle of "democratic centralism"

==== Stance on religion ====
Militant secularism was emphasized in the "Declaration of Principles" manifesto published by the Ba'ath party in 1960; which declared that the party's "educational policy" was to build a "new generation of Arabs that believe in the unity of the nation and the eternity of its mission". The manifesto also stated that this envisaged Ba'athist generation would be "committed to scientific thought freed from the shackles of superstition and backward customs" and replace religion with Arab nationalism as their belief system.

=== Neo-Ba'ath: 1964–1966 ===
Neo-Ba'athism refers to the dramatic changes that manifested in Ba'athist ideology from 1960 to 1964, and the Military Committee's takeover of the Syrian Regional Branch and the National Command in the period 1964 to 1966. The 6th National Congress signified the takeover of the party by an anti-militarist left, which opposed both the traditional leaders in the National Command and the pragmatists in the Military Committee. When the anti-military left called for popular democracy, no involvement of the military in national politics and popular struggle, the Military Committee became concerned. In 1965, Ba'athist President Amin al-Hafiz imposed the socialist policies adopted in the 6th National Congress; fully nationalizing Syrian industry and vast segments of the private sector, and establishing a centralized command economy.

By 1965 the anti-military leftists began to "spread rumors about the rightist character of the military junta [Military Committee] within the party and their subversive efforts to engulf it. There was not a single officer in the party who was not accused of conspiracy and reactionary tendencies." In collaboration with the National Command, the Military Committee succeeded in expelling the anti-military left from the party at the 7th National Congress. The Military Committee, which now controlled the Syrian Regional Branch, took control of the Ba'ath Party in the coup of 1966. The military committee accused the Old Guard of diluting socialist ideology and casting aside "collective leadership". According to Middle East expert Avraham Ben-Tzur, "the [neo-]Ba'th in its latest variant is a bureaucratic apparatus headed by the military, whose daily life and routine are shaped by the rigid military oppression on the home front, and [Soviet aid among others] military aid."

== Regional branches ==
=== Iraq ===
Fuad al-Rikabi founded the Iraqi Regional Branch in 1951 or 1952. There are those who trace the branch's founding to Abd ar Rahman ad Damin and Abd al Khaliq al Khudayri in 1947, after their return from the 1st National Congress, which was held in Syria. Another version is that the branch was established in 1948 by Rikabi and Sa'dun Hamadi, a Shia Muslim. However, Efraim Karsh and Inari Rautsi contend that the Regional Branch was established in the 1940s, but that it received official recognition as a Regional Branch of the Ba'ath Party in 1952 by the National Command. What is certain is that Rikabi was elected the Regional Branch's first Regional Secretary in 1952.

The party initially consisted of a majority of Shia Muslims, as Rikabi recruited supporters mainly from his friends and family, but slowly became Sunni dominated. The Regional Branch, and other parties of pan-Arab inclination, had difficulties in recruiting Shia members. Most Shi'ites considered pan-Arab ideology as a Sunni project, since the majority of Arabs are Sunnis.

At the time of 14 July Revolution in 1958, which overthrew the Hashemite monarchy, the Regional Branch had 300 members. The Iraqi Regional Branch supported Abdul-Karim Qasim's rule on the grounds that he would seek Iraq's entry into the United Arab Republic. Of the 16-members of Qasim's cabinet, 12 of them were Regional Branch members. After taking power, Qasim changed his position on the UAR, reverting to the old "Iraq first policy". This turn displeased the Regional Branch and other Arab nationalist groups. Due to his policy reversal, the Regional Branch gathered a group, led by Saddam Hussein, which tried but failed to assassinate Qasim.

The Regional Branch seized power in the Ramadan Revolution. The coup was led by leading Regional Branch member Ahmed Hassan al-Bakr. The plotters appointed Abdul Salam Arif, a Nasserite, to the Presidency while al-Bakr was appointed the country's Prime Minister. However, real power was in the hands of Ali Salih al-Sadi, the branch's Regional Secretary. After taking power, the Regional Branch through its militia, the National Guard, initiated what Iraqi expert Con Coughlin referred to as an "orgy of violence" against communist and left-wing elements. These repressive measures coupled with factionalism within the Regional Branch led to the November 1963 Iraqi coup d'état by President Arif and his Nasserite supporters. Iraq expert Malik Mufti believes Aflaq may have supported Arif's coup because it weakened al-Sadi's position within the party and strengthened his own. The coup forced the branch to go underground. Due to the coup, several leading Ba'athist were jailed, such as al-Bakr and Saddam. Despite this, the Regional Branch elected al-Bakr as Regional Secretary in 1964.

=== Jordan ===
Following the party's establishment in Syria, Ba'athist ideas spread throughout the Arab world. In Jordan Ba'athist thought first spread to the East Bank in the late-1940s, most notably at universities. While the Regional Branch was not formed until 1951, several meetings took place at the universities where students and professors alike would discuss the Ba'athist thought. Despite the ideology being very popular, it took time before the actual Regional Branch was established. A group of teachers established the Regional Branch in the city by Al-Karak. At the very beginning, the clinic owned by Abd al-Rahman Shuqyar was used as the branch's meeting place. Bahjat Abu Gharbiyah became the Regional Branch's first member in the West Bank, and was thus resigned the responsibility of building the party's organization in the area the branch secretary in the West Bank, and was thus responsible in that area. In the West Bank, the branch was most active in the cities of Jerusalem and Ramallah.

The 1st Regional Congress was held in 1951 in the home of Abdullah Rimawi. The congress mapped out the "future course of the party". The next year, the 2nd Regional Congress was held, this time in Abdallah Na'was' home. It elected a Regional Command and appointed Rimawi as the branch's Regional Secretary. Shugyar, Gharbiyah and Na'was agreed to serve in the Regional Branch's Central Committee. Rimawi and Na'was, his deputy, would prove effective leaders. Shortly after the 2nd Regional Congress, the branch launched a successful recruitment campaign in Jordanian and Palestinian neighbourhoods and cities. On 28 August 1956 the branch was legalized by a High Court.

Both Rimawi and Na'was were elected to Parliament in the 1950 and 1951 elections as independents (the branch was not a legal party at the time). In the 1951 election, the branch managed to elect three members to parliament. Rimawi was able to retain his seat in parliament until the 1956 election. None of these elections can be considered democratic. Shuqyar, during the 1951 elections, was imprisoned by the authorities because his views were deemed too radical. Less than a month before the election day, the British Embassy in Amman had estimated that Shuqyar would gain an easy victory. However, because of the undemocratic nature of the election, Shuqyar was not elected. As voting patterns would prove, voters who voted for Ba'athist candidates lived in Irbid and Amman on the East Bank, and Jerusalem and Nablus on the West Bank.

Shuqyar during a government-imposed exile to Southern Jordan, used his spare time reading Marxist and Leninist literature. While he never became a communist, Shuqyar began to support communist concepts. On his return from exile he tried to persuade the Regional Branch to join in an electoral front with the Jordanian Communist Party. However, the Regional Branch leaders Rimawi, Na'was, Gharbiyah and Munif Razzaz opposed such an idea, and because of it, Shuqyar left the Ba'ath Party.

Rimawi and Na'was were elected to the National Command at the 2nd National Congress (held in 1952). At the 6th and 7th National Congress, the Regional Branch elected Razzaz to the National Command.

=== Lebanon ===
The Lebanese Regional Branch was formed in 1949–1950. During the existence of the UAR, the Regional Branch was split into two factions, those supporting Nasser and those opposing him. However, in April 1960, the UAR denied the Regional Branch organ As Sahafäh access into the UAR-ruled Syria.

The Regional Branch was strongest in the city of Tripoli. In the 1960 elections, Abd al-Majid al-Rafei was just a few votes short of being elected to parliament. However, a persistent problem for him during his election campaign was the vocal criticism of him and the Regional Branch by the Lebanese Communist Party. In Tripoli the Communists supported the candidacy of Rashid Karami, to ensure themselves of a Regional Branch victory. On 17 July 1961 a group of rival Ba'athists led by Rimawi opened fire on several of the Regional Branch's members.

During the UAR years, the same factional lines that developed in the Syrian Regional Branch came to the Lebanese Regional Branch. At the 4th National Congress (held in Lebanon), which was mainly attended by delegates representing Lebanon, several resolutions with a pronounced anti-Nasser tone were approved. At the same time, criticism of Aflaq and Bitar was severe, both their leadership records and their ideology were criticized. A resolution was approved, which stated that the party leaders (Aflaq and al-Bitar among others) had too hastily entered into a union with Egypt, had wrongly dissolved the Syrian Regional Branch in 1958, and had given pan-Arabism primacy when socialism was more important. The resolution also affirmed the need to use a more Marxist lens rather than a Ba'athist one to analyze the current situation, and the need for the party to strengthen their positions among the workers, peasants, artisans, and shopkeepers. Because of the position of the Lebanese Regional Branch, Aflaq at the 5th National Congress invited enough Iraqi Regional Branch delegates to neutralize the Lebanese delegates. However, at the same time, the Lebanese Regional Branch opposed Hawrani and his faction. At the 6th National Congress, the Lebanese Regional Branch elected Jubrän Majdalani and Khalid al-Ali to the National Command.

At the 7th National Congress, the National Command in collaboration with the Military Committee removed leftists, such as those found in the Lebanese Regional Branch, from leadership positions, and expelled them from the party in the most severe cases. The Lebanese Regional Branch managed to elect three members to the National Command at the 7th National Congress; Majdalani, al-Ali and Abd al-Majid Rafi.

=== Libya ===
The Regional Branch was founded in the 1950s by Amr Taher Deghayes. Ba'athism was a major political force in Libya following the establishment of the United Arab Republic. Many intellectuals were attracted to Ba'athist ideology during the later years of the Kingdom of Libya. However, with help from Nasserist propaganda, several Ba'athists changed affiliation and became Nasserists instead. The growth of these pan-Arab ideologies concerned the government, which led to the incarceration of several Nasserist and Ba'athist military officers in the early sixties. The Ba'athist were accused of working to overthrow "the political, economic and social system" of the Kingdom; the sentences ranged from everything to eight months to two years. By 1964, the Libyan Regional Branch had only managed to establish one-level below the Regional Command, the branch-level. Syrian specialist John Devlin estimated that the Libyan Regional Branch had been 50 and 150 members in 1964.

=== Syria ===
Syrian politics took a dramatic turn in 1954 when the military government of Adib Shishakli was overthrown and the democratic system restored. The Ba'ath, now a large and popular organisation, won 15 out of 142 parliamentary seats in the Syrian election that year, becoming the second-largest party in parliament. Aside from the Syrian Communist Party (SCP), the Ba'ath Party was the only party able to organise mass protests among workers. The party was supported by the intelligentsia due to their pro-Egyptian and anti-imperialist stance along with their advocation of social reform.

The Ba'ath faced considerable competition from ideological competitors, notably the Syrian Social Nationalist Party (SSNP), which supported the establishment of a Greater Syria. The Ba'ath Party's main adversary was the SCP, whose support for class struggle and internationalism was anathema to the Ba'ath. In addition to parliamentary-level competition, all these parties (as well as Islamists) competed in street-level activity and sought to recruit support among the military.

By the end of 1957, the SCP was able to weaken the Ba'ath Party to such an extent that the Ba'ath Party drafted a bill in December that called for a union with Egypt, a move that proved to be very popular. The Ba'ath leadership dissolved the party in 1958, gambling that the illegalisation of certain parties would hurt the SCP more than it would the Ba'ath.

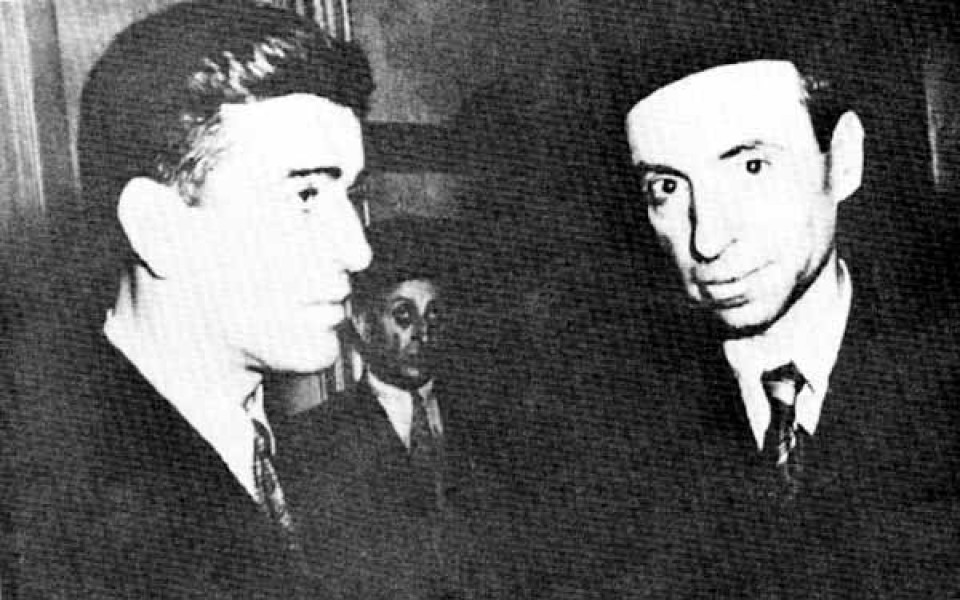
Akram al-Hourani (left) with Michel Aflaq, 1957.

A military coup in Damascus in 1961 brought the UAR to an end. Sixteen prominent politicians signed a statement supporting the coup, among them al-Hawrani and Salah al-Din al-Bitar (who later retracted his signature). Following the UAR's dissolution, the Ba'ath Party was reestablished at the 1962 congress. The Military Committee did not show itself to the civilian wing of the party at this congress. During the congress, Aflaq and the Military Committee, through Muhammad Umran, made contact for the first time; the committee asked for permission to initiate a coup d'état; Aflaq supported the conspiracy.

Following the success of the Ramadan Revolution, led by the Ba'ath Party's Iraqi Regional Branch, the Military Committee hastily convened to hatch a coup against Nazim al-Qudsi's presidency. The 8 March Revolution proved successful, and a Ba'athist government in Syria was established. The plotters first order was to establish the National Council for the Revolutionary Command (NCRC), consisting entirely of Ba'athists and Nasserists, and controlled by military personnel rather than civilians from the very beginning.

While the Ba'ath Party had attained power, there was significant infighting. The Military Committee, which was itself a tiny minority of the already small Ba'ath Party membership, ruled by force. The Ba'ath Party lacked a popular base, as it had only 2,500 members by mid-1963. Even if membership expanded, the authoritarian rule it had introduced would only increase.

The civilian wing was plagued by infighting between the radical socialist and moderate faction, while the military stood more unified. Whatever the case, the Syrian Regional Command slowly amassed its powers by weakening the National Command. This all came to a head in the 1966 Syrian coup d'état.

The party officially indefinitely suspended all activities in Syria on 11 December 2024, following the Fall of the Assad regime.

=== Others ===
Following the Ba'ath Party's founding, regional branches were established in Kuwait, Saudi Arabia and Oman . Not long after it established branches in North Yemen and South Yemen. In Tunisia, a Regional Branch was established in the 1950s, but was forced underground for much of its existence. The Saudi Regional Branches elected Ali Ghannäm to represent them at the 7th National Command. While its currently unknown which side the Saudi Ba'ath took after the 1966 split, it published a newspaper, Sawt al-Tal'iyya, from 1973 to 1980. It was an ardent critic of the Saudi royal family and American imperialism. The majority of its members were Shia Muslims. In late 1963, Ba'ath cells were being established in Sudan, and there were even rumours that a Ba'ath cell had been established in Egypt. A regional Ba'ath Party branch was established in Algeria in 1988 after the one-party system ended.

== Bibliography ==
Articles & journals

- Ben-Tzur, Avraham (July 1968). "The Neo-Ba'th Party of Syria". Journal of Contemporary History. 3 (3). SAGE Publications: 161–181. doi:10.1177/002200946800300310. JSTOR 259704. S2CID 159345006.
- Kaylani, Nabil (January 1972). "The Rise of the Syrian Ba'th, 1940–1958: Political Success, Party Failure". International Journal of Middle East Studies. 3 (1). Cambridge University Press: 3–23. doi:10.1017/s0020743800030014. JSTOR 162353. S2CID 154642979.

Bibliography

- Ali, Tariq (2004). Bush in Babylon: The Recolonisation of Iraq. Verso. ISBN 1-84467-512-2.
- Anderson, Betty Signe (2005). Nationalist Voices in Jordan: The Street and the State. University of Texas Press. ISBN 978-0-292-70625-5. Archived from the original on 2 April 2023.
- Batatu, Hanna (1999). Syria's Peasantry, the Descendants of Its Lesser Rural Notables, and Their Politics. Princeton University Press. ISBN 9780691002545.
- Bengio, Ofra (1998). Saddam's Word: Political Discourse in Iraq. Oxford University Press. ISBN 0-19-511439-6.
- Choueiri, Youssef (2000). Arab Nationalism: A History: Nation and State in the Arab World. Wiley-Blackwell. ISBN 0-631-21729-0.
- Claessen, Erik (2010). Stalemate: An Anatomy of Conflicts between Democracies, Islamists, and Muslim Autocrats: An Anatomy of Conflicts between Democracies, Islamists, and Muslim Autocrats. ABC-Clio. ISBN 9780313384455.
- Commins, Dean (2004). Historical Dictionary of Syria. Scarecrow Press. ISBN 0-8108-4934-8.
- Coughlin, Con (2005). Saddam: His Rise and Fall. Harper Perennial. ISBN 0-06-050543-5.
- Dawisha, Addid (2005). Arab nationalism in the Twentieth Century: From Triumph to Despair. Princeton University Press. ISBN 978-0-691-12272-4.
- DeFronzo, James (2009). The Iraq War: Origins and Consequences. Westview Press. ISBN 978-0-8133-4391-4.
- Devlin, John (1979). The Baath Party: a History from its Origins to 1966 (2nd ed.). Hoover Institute Press. OCLC 884273607.
- Federal Research Division (2004). Syria: A Country Study. Kessinger Publishing. ISBN 978-1-4191-5022-7.
- George, Alan (2003). Syria: Neither Bread nor Freedom. Zed Books. ISBN 1-84277-213-9.
- Ghareeb, Edmund A.; Dougherty, Beth K. (2004). Historical Dictionary of Iraq. The Scarecrow Press, Ltd. ISBN 978-0-8108-4330-1.
- Finer, Samuel; Stanley, Jay (2009). The Man on Horseback: The Role of the Military in Politics. Transaction Publishers. ISBN 978-0-7658-0922-3.
- Goldman, Ralph Morris (2002). The Future Catches Up: Transnational Parties and Democracy. iUniverse. ISBN 978-0-595-22888-1.
- Hiro, Dilip (1982). Inside the Middle East. Routledge & Kegan Paul. ISBN 0-7100-9039-0.
- Jones, Jeremy (2007). Negotiating Change: The New Politics of the Middle East. I.B. Tauris. ISBN 978-1-84511-269-1.
- Karsh, Afraim; Rautsi, Inari (1991). Saddam Hussein: A Political Biography. Grove Press. ISBN 078815110X.
- Kostiner, Joseph (2007). Conflict and Cooperation in the Gulf Region. VS Verlag. ISBN 978-3-531-16205-8.
- Mufti, Malik (1996). Sovereign creations: pan-Arabism and Political order in Syria and Iraq. Cornell University Press. ISBN 0-06-050543-5.
- Moaddel, Mansoor Erik (2005). Islamic Modernism, Nationalism, and Fundamentalism: Episode and Discourse. University of Chicago Press. ISBN 9780226533339.
- Ministry of Information (1971). The Socialist Arab Ba'ath: a Profound Belief. Government of the Syrian Arab Republic. Ministry of Information.
- Nakash, Yitzhak (2003). The Shi'is of Iraq. Princeton University Press. ISBN 978-0-691-11575-7.
- Oron, Yitzhak (1960). Middle East Record. Vol. 1. George Weidenfeld & Nicolson Limited. ASIN B0028IN0X6.
- Peretz, Don (1994). The Middle East Today. Greenwood Publishing Group. ISBN 0-275-94576-6.
- Podeh, Elie (1999). The Decline of Arab Unity: The Rise and Fall of the United Arabic Republic. Sussex Academic Press. ISBN 1-902210-20-4.
- Polk, William Roe (2006). Understanding Iraq: A Whistlestop Tour from Ancient Babylon to Occupied Baghdad. I.B. Tauris. ISBN 978-1-84511-123-6.
- Rabinovich, Itamar (1972). Syria Under the Baʻth, 1963–66: The Army Party Symbiosis. Transaction Publishers. ISBN 0-7065-1266-9.
- Reich, Bernard (1990). Political Leaders of the Contemporary Middle East and North Africa: A Biographical Dictionary. Greenwood Publishing Group. ISBN 0313262136.
- Salem, Paul (1994). Bitter Legacy: Ideology and Politics in the Arab World. Syracuse University Press. ISBN 978-0-8156-2628-2.
- Seale, Patrick (1990). Asad of Syria: The Struggle for the Middle East. University of California Press. ISBN 0-520-06976-5.
- Seddon, David (2004). A Political and Economic Dictionary of the Middle East. Taylor & Francis. ISBN 1-85743-212-6.
- Sheffer, Gabriel; Ma'oz, Moshe (2002). Middle Eastern Minorities and Diasporas. Sussex Academic Press. ISBN 978-1-902210-84-1.
- Simmons, Geoffrey Leslie (1993). Libya: The Struggle for Survival. Palgrave Macmillan. ISBN 0-312-08997-X.
- Tejei, Jordi (2009). Syria's Kurds: History, Politics and Society. Routledge. ISBN 978-1-134-09643-5.
- Wright, John (1981). Libya: A Modern History. Taylor & Francis. ISBN 0-7099-2727-4.
